= Fisher Body =

Automobile coachbuilder and division of General Motors

Coordinates: 42.369°N 83.063°W

- Type: Division of General Motors
- Industry: Automotive
- Founded: July 22, 1908; 118 years ago in Detroit, Michigan, United States
- Founders: Fred Fisher, Charles Fisher
- Defunct: 1984
- Fate: Dissolved by GM
- Headquarters: Detroit, Michigan, U.S.

Fisher Body was an automobile coachbuilder founded as the Fisher Body Company by Frederic and Charles Fisher in 1908 in Detroit, Michigan when they absorbed a fledgling autobody maker. By 1916, the company had grown into one of the world's largest manufacturing firms, the Fisher Body Corporation, and was producing over 350,000 bodies a year for nearly 20 different makers. In 1919, under the guidance of its ever-aggressive president, William C. Durant, General Motors purchased a 60% stake in the company.

Before stamped metal bodies and interiors became the norm, the company owned 160,000 acres (650 km^{2}) of timberland and used more wood, carpet, tacks, and thread than any other manufacturer in the world. It had more than 40 plants and employed more than 100,000 people, and pioneered many improvements in tooling and automobile design including closed all-weather bodies.

Fisher Body's contribution to the war effort in WWI and WWII included the production of airplanes and tanks. Fisher Body developed the prototype Fisher P-75 Eagle heavy fighter.

Over the decades GM increasingly internalized Fisher Brothers in its operations, eventually acquiring the entire company. In 1984 GM dissolved its Fisher Body Division as part of its extensive North American restructuring. Eight parts-making facilities from within the Fisher division were combined with the Guide division, which manufactured headlights and plastic parts, to form the Fisher Guide Division. Other plants formerly operated by Fisher were reorganized to become the Chevrolet, Pontiac, GM of Canada (CPC) and the Buick, Oldsmobile, Cadillac (BOC) groups.

The name and its iconic "Body by Fisher" logo were widely known, as hundreds of millions of General Motors vehicles displayed a "Body by Fisher" emblem on their door sill plates until Fisher Body's demise.

== History ==
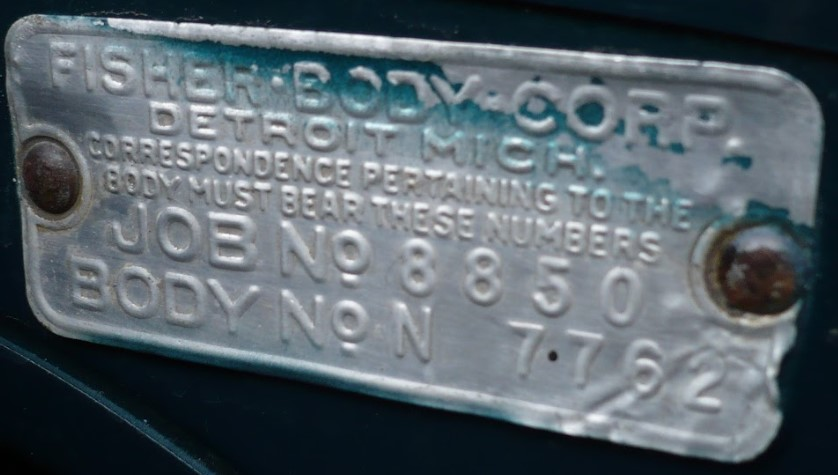
A 1929 Fisher Body tag

Fisher Body's beginnings trace back to a horse-drawn carriage shop in Norwalk, Ohio, in the late 1800s. Lawrence P. Fisher (1852 Peru, Ohio – 1921, Norwalk, Ohio) and his wife Margaret Theisen (1857 Baden, Germany – 1936 Detroit, Michigan) had a large family of eleven children; seven were sons who would become part of the Fisher Body Company in Detroit. Lawrence and Margaret were married in Sandusky, Ohio, in 1876. Margaret Theisen Fisher lived in Detroit after her husband died.

The Fisher brothers were:

1. Frederick John Fisher (1878–1941)
2. Charles Thomas Fisher (1880–1963)
3. William Andrew Fisher (1886–1969)
4. Lawrence P. Fisher (1888–1961)
5. Edward F. Fisher (1891–1972)
6. Alfred J. Fisher (1892–1963)
7. Howard A. Fisher (1902–1942)

In 1904 and 1905, the two eldest brothers, Fred and Charles, came to Detroit where their uncle Albert Fisher had established Standard Wagon Works during the latter part of the 1880s. The brothers found work at the C. R. Wilson Company, a manufacturer of horse-drawn carriage bodies that was beginning to make bodies for automobile manufacturers. With financing from their uncle, on July 22, 1908, Fred and Charles Fisher established the Fisher Body Company. Their uncle soon wanted out, and the brothers obtained the needed funds from businessman Louis Mendelssohn who became a shareholder and director. Soon Charles and Fred Fisher brought their five younger brothers into the business.

Prior to forming the company, Fred Fisher had built the first closed-body coupe, the 1905 Cadillac Osceola, at the C. R. Wilson Company. The Osceola was requested by Cadillac founder Henry M. Leland to determine the feasibility of a car body that was closed to the elements. It was built on the chassis of the 1905 Cadillac Model E. Starting in 1910, Fisher became the supplier of all closed bodies for Cadillac, Buick, Oakland and Oldsmobile.

In the early years of the company, the Fisher Brothers had to develop new body designs because the "horseless carriage" bodies lacked the strength to withstand the vibration of the new motorcars. By 1913, the Fisher Body Company had the capacity to produce 100,000 bodies per year and customers included Ford, Krit, Chalmers, General Motors, and Studebaker. Highly successful, they expanded into Canada, establishing a plant in Walkerville, Ontario. By 1914 their operations had grown to become the world's largest manufacturer of auto bodies. One reason for their success was the development of interchangeable wooden body parts that did not require hand-fitting, as was the case in the construction of carriages. This required the design of new precision woodworking tools.

The Fisher Body and Buick chassis were built in Saint John, New Brunswick, Canada, in the 1920s.

=== Fisher Body Corporation and General Motors ===
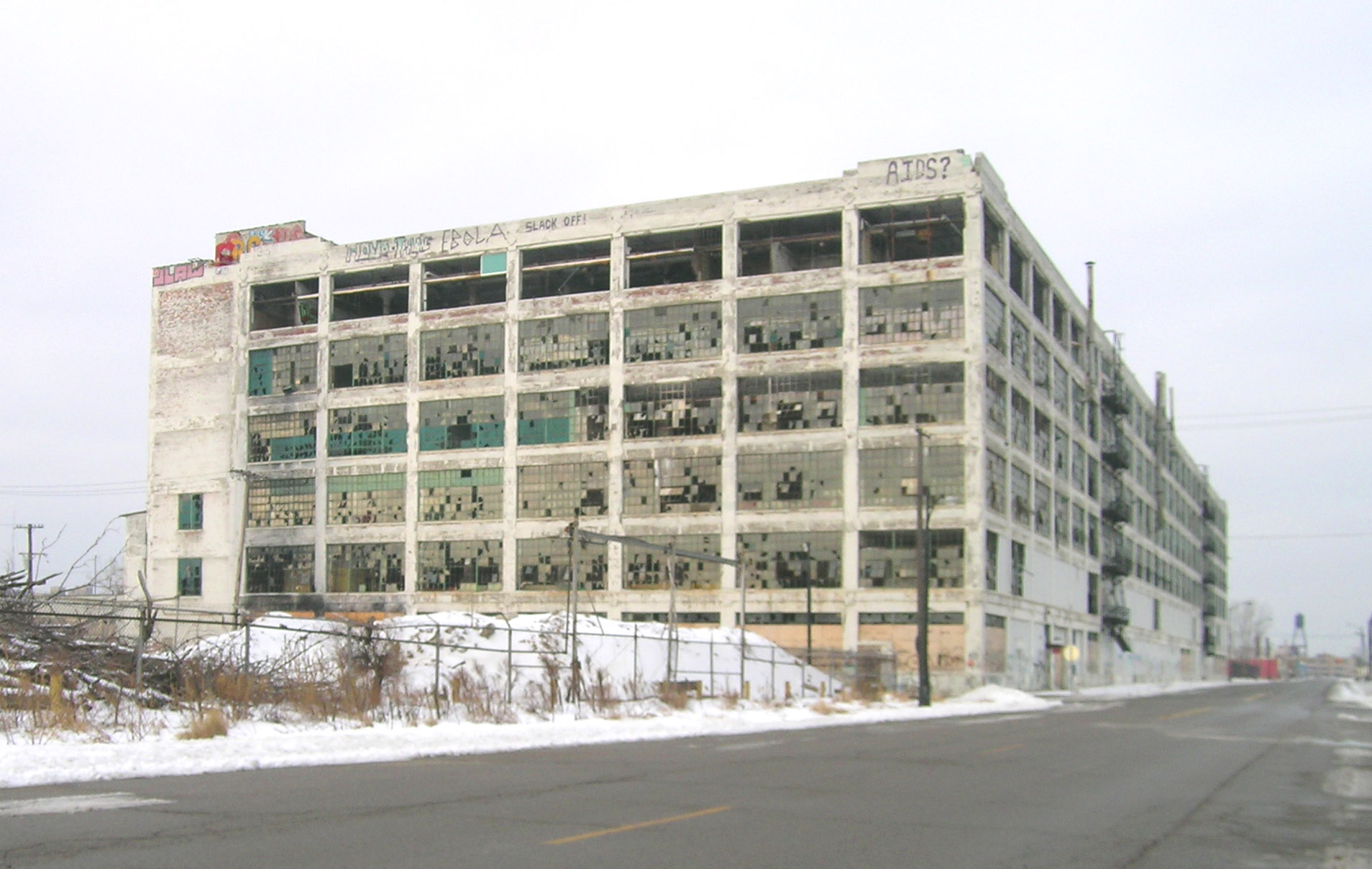
Fisher Body Plant 21, Piquette and St. Antoine

In 1916, the company became the Fisher Body Corporation. Its capacity was 370,000 bodies per year and its customers included Abbott, Buick, Cadillac, Chalmers, Chandler, Chevrolet, Church-Field, Elmore, EMF, Ford, Herreshoff, Hudson, Krit, Oldsmobile, Oakland, Packard, Pontiac, Regal, and Studebaker.

The company constructed the now-abandoned Smith, Hinchman & Grylls-designed Fisher Body Plant 21 (commonly misattributed to Albert Kahn, who designed the historic landmark Fisher Building), on Piquette Street, in Detroit, in 1919. The building is now part of the Piquette Avenue Industrial Historic District and is being revived by Detroit developers Greg Jackson and Richard Hosey and architecture firm McIntosh Poris Architects as Fisher 21 Lofts, a mixed-use project combining 433 apartments and commercial spaces. At the time, Fisher had more than 40 buildings encompassing 3,700,000 square feet (344,000 m^{2}) of floor space.

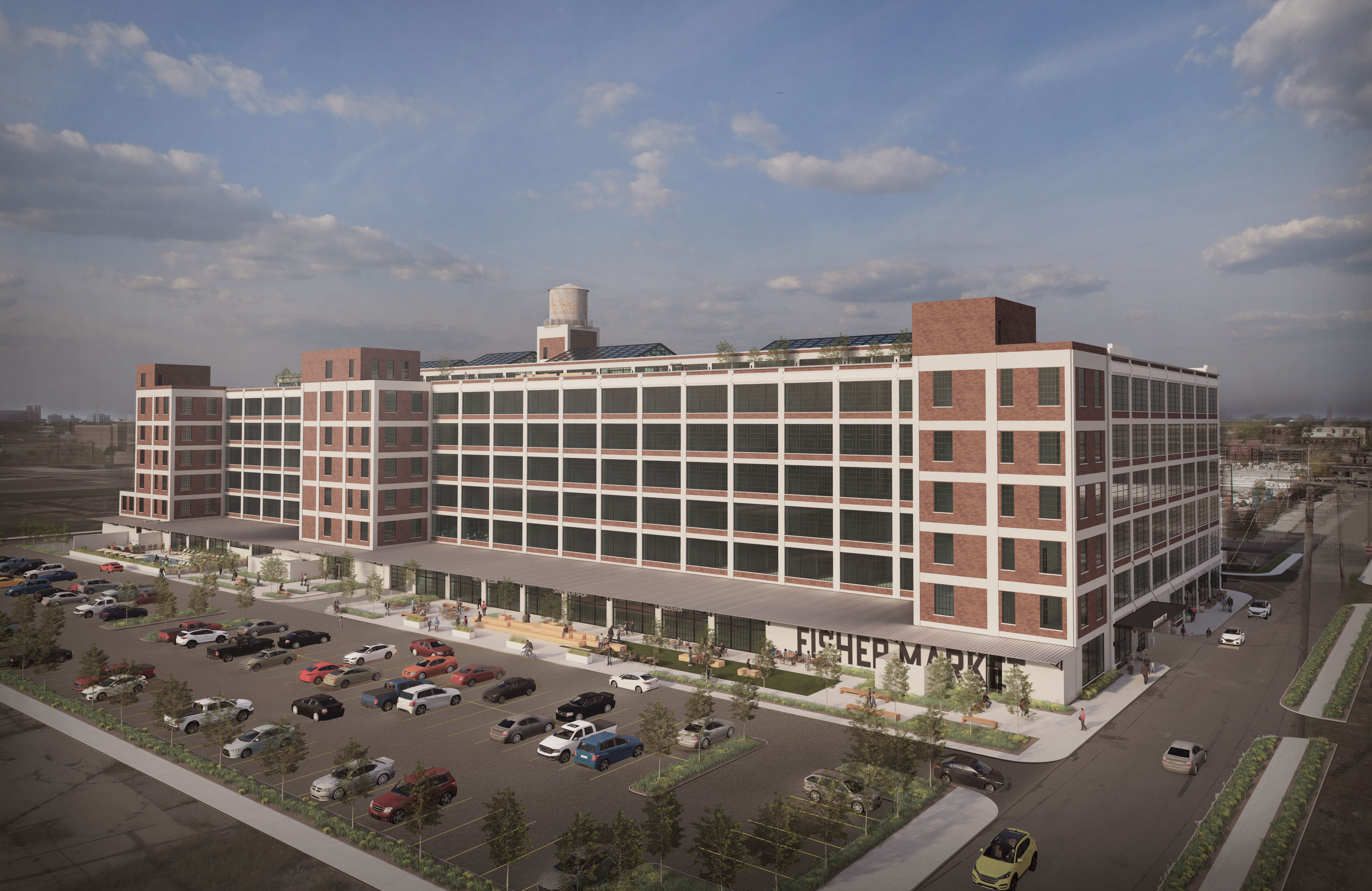
- Fisher 21 Lofts Rendering, McIntosh Poris Architects.
  Fisher Body – West Fort & Livernois
- Fisher Body Plant 2 (wood kiln) – St. Antoine
- Fisher Body Plant 4 – Oakland Ave.
- Fisher Body Plant 12 – 1961 E. Milwaukee
- Fisher Body Plant 18 (aka Cadillac Fleetwood Plant) – West End Ave
- Fisher Plant 21 – 700 Piquette
- Fisher Plant 23 – 601 Piquette
- Fisher Plant 37 – 950 E. Milwaukee at Hastings

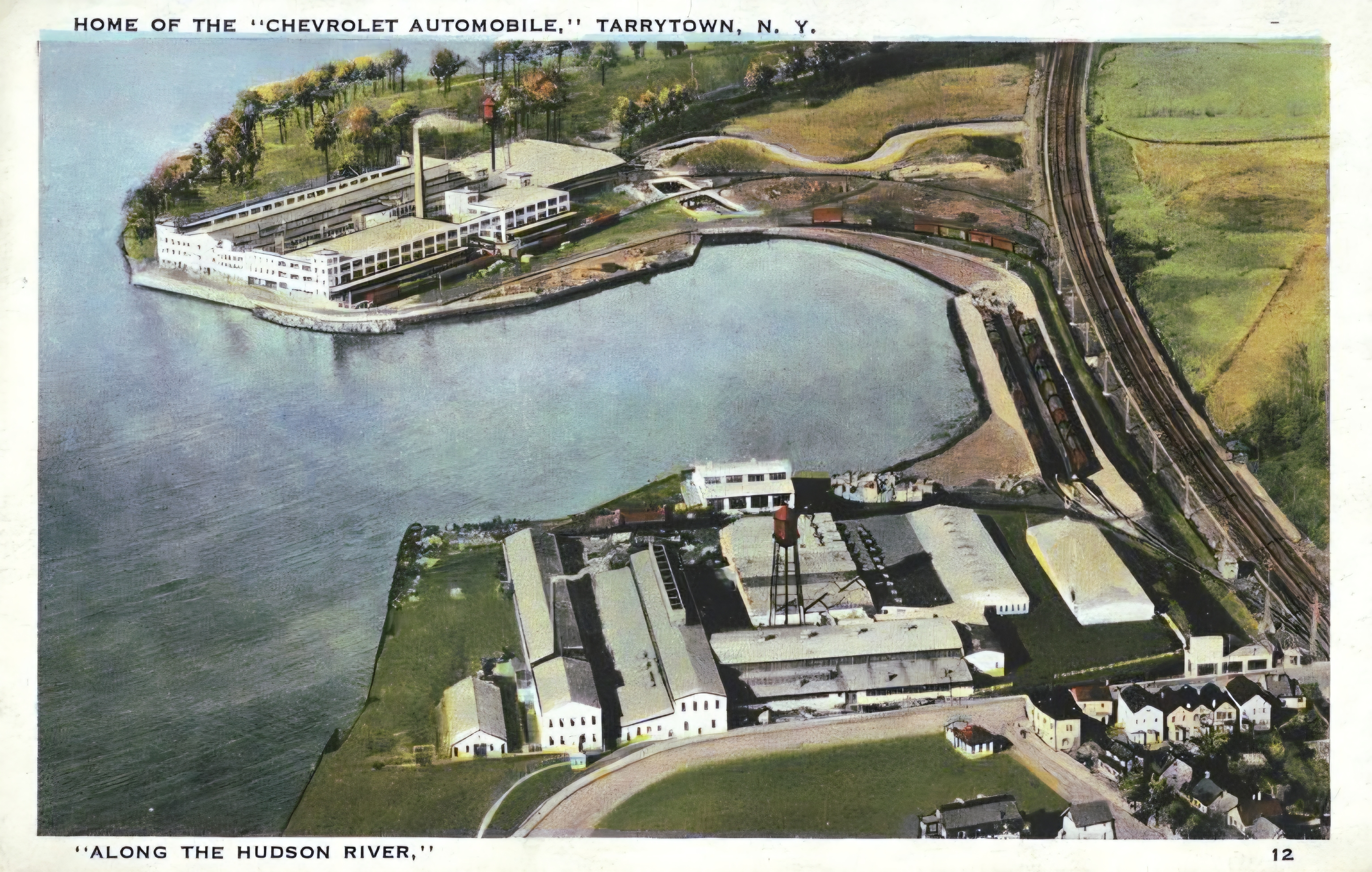
A 1920s postcard depicting the Fisher Body coachbuilding (top) and the Chevrolet assembly (bottom) divisions of the General Motors North Tarrytown Assembly plant in Westchester County, New York

=== Sale ===
In a 1919 deal put together by president William C. Durant, General Motors bought 60% of the company. The Fisher company purchased Fleetwood Metal Body in 1925, and in 1926 was integrated entirely as an in-house coachbuilding division of General Motors. Fisher Body Division was dissolved in 1984, with some of its plants taken over by the newly created Fisher Guide Division (later Inland Fisher Guide), and the remaining facilities absorbed by other GM operations.

== Fisher family ==
On August 14, 1944, the Fisher brothers resigned from General Motors to devote their time to other interests, including the Fisher Building on West Grand Boulevard in Detroit. The brothers also mounted a bid to take over Hudson Motors, but their tender offer fell short of its market value and the effort was rejected by stockholders.

A firm unrelated to Fisher Body, Fisher & Company, was founded in 1947 by members of the Fisher family, and continues to use the name, with such divisions as Fisher Dynamics. On January 19, 1972, the last of the Fisher brothers died. The seven brothers donated millions of dollars to schools, churches, and other charitable causes and were active in directing those endeavors.

The Fisher family has continued on in the automotive industry with Fisher Corporation (metal stamping), General Safety (seat belts), and Fisher Dynamics (seat mechanisms & structures), in the U.S., Mexico, China, and India.

On July 22, 2008, Fisher Coachworks, LLC was launched with Gregory W. Fisher, grandson of Alfred J. Fisher, as CEO. The new company was developing a prototype of the GTB-40, a hybrid-electric 40' transit bus developed by Autokinetics of Rochester Hills, Michigan, that uses Nitronic, a stainless steel alloy developed by AK Steel that allows the bus to be half the nominal weight of a standard transit bus and achieve twice the fuel economy.

As of 2010, Fisher Coachworks, LLC went out of business after two years, producing only a single prototype bus. On March 3, 2011, the Michigan Economic Development Corporation received a check for $29,000 for all of Fisher CoachWorks’ remaining assets.

Alfred J. Fisher Jr., an automotive safety pioneer and son of Fisher Body's Alfred J. Fisher Sr., died June 19, 2012.

=== Mansions in Detroit ===
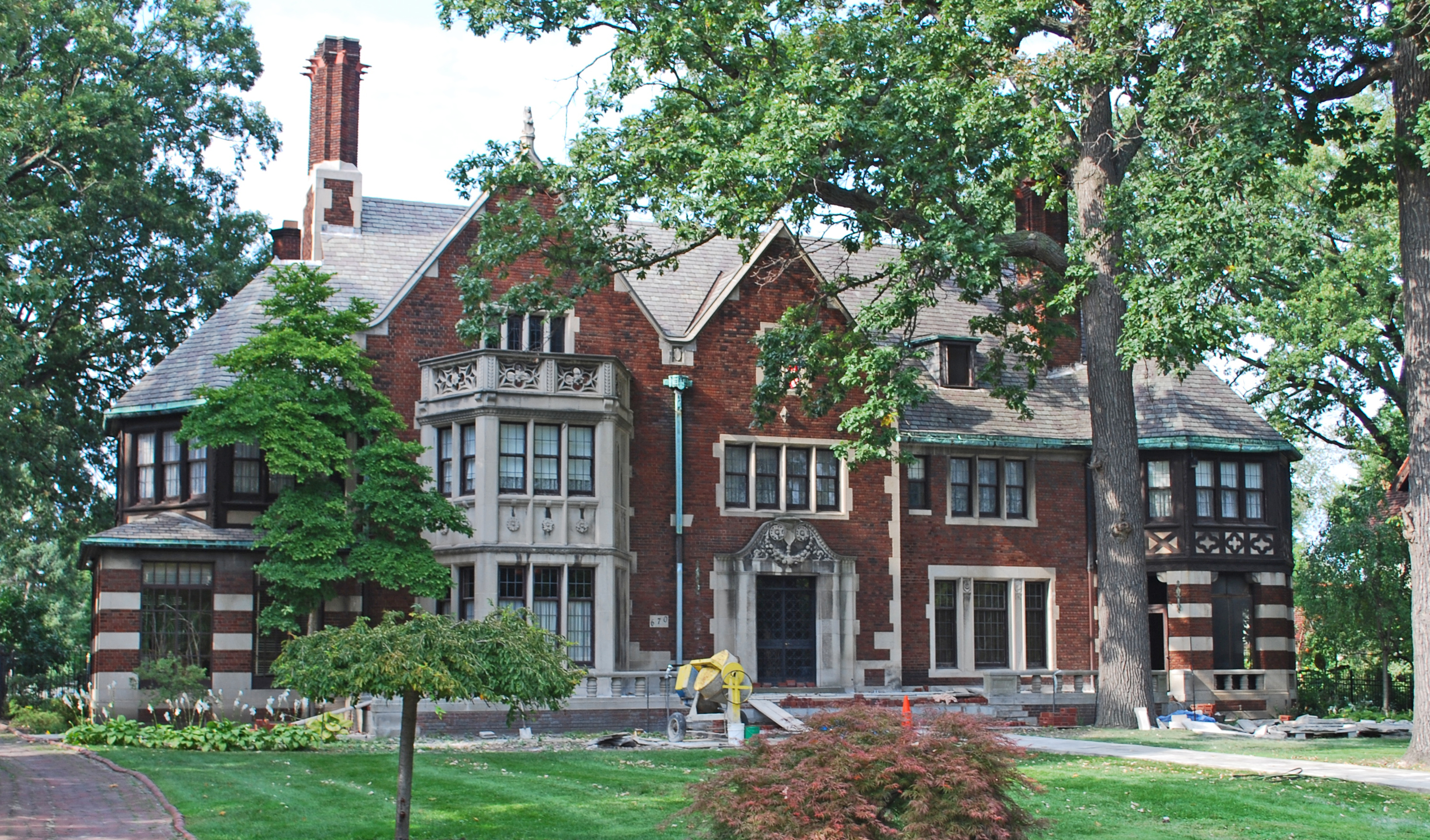
Tudor revival style mansion of Charles T. Fisher, president of Fisher Body corporation in Detroit's Boston-Edison Historic District, designed by architect George Mason

Mansions in Detroit owned (at one time) by the Fisher family, by address
Address	Neighborhood	Architect	Year	Area	Brother	Status
54 Arden Park Boulevard	Arden Park-East Boston	George D. Mason	1918	10,800 sq. ft.	Frederick J.	Private residence
670 West Boston Boulevard	Boston-Edison	George D. Mason	1915	18,000 sq. ft.	Charles T.	Private residence
1791 Wellesley Drive	Palmer Woods	Richard H. Marr	1925	20,000 sq. ft.	William A.	Fire in 1994; demolished
383 Lenox Avenue	Jefferson–Chalmers	C. Howard Crane	1928	22,000 sq. ft.	Lawrence P.	Bhaktivedanta Cultural Center
892 West Boston Boulevard	Boston-Edison	Richard H. Marr	1923	10,000 sq. ft.	Edward F.	Private residence
1771 Balmoral Drive	Palmer Woods	Richard H. Marr	1926	20,000 sq. ft.	Alfred J.	Private residence

== Milestones ==
- 1930 – Slanted windshields for reduced glare
- 1933 – "No-Draft" ventilation, also known as Ventipanes
- 1934 – One-piece steel "turret top" roofs
- 1935 – Former Durant Motors plant in Lansing, Michigan, opens
- 1936 – Dual windshield wipers
- 1959 – Produced bodies for GM's first unibody car – The 1960 Chevrolet Corvair
- 1969 – Fisher's "Side Guard Beam" is introduced. Ternstedt Division merged into Fisher Body.
- 1974 – Introduced GM's first ignition interlock system
- 1974 – Produced GM's first airbag
- 1979 – Fisher Northern Ireland established, opens plant in Dundonald, Northern Ireland
- 1984 – Fisher Body Division dissolves, with its operations transferred to other GM divisions. These include newly created Fisher Guide Division, Chevrolet-Pontiac-Canada Group, and Buick-Oldsmobile-Cadillac Group.
- 1988 – Fisher Guide closes Hamilton/Fairfield, Ohio, facility
- 1989 – Fisher Guide merges with Inland Division to become Inland Fisher Guide
- 1990 – Inland Fisher Guide closes Elyria, Ohio, facility
- 1995 – Inland Fisher Guide absorbed into Delphi Automotive Systems
- 2008 – Fisher Coachworks, LLC, officially launches and begins development of the GTB-40 transit bus
- 2010 – Fisher Coachworks, LLC, folds and is liquidated the following year.

== Other products ==
Aircraft

- Fisher P-75 Eagle

== Sport ==
In 1979, General Motors established a Fisher Body plant in Dundonald, Northern Ireland. The workers of the site established Fisher Body Football Club, and competed in the Northern Amateur Football League. They achieved silverware, winning Division 1C and the Cochrane Corry Cup. Due to ongoing success, they established a reserves team.

Northern Ireland Premiership legend Glenn Ferguson played for Fisher Body before being picked up by Ards F.C.
