= Works team =

Sports team financed by an employer

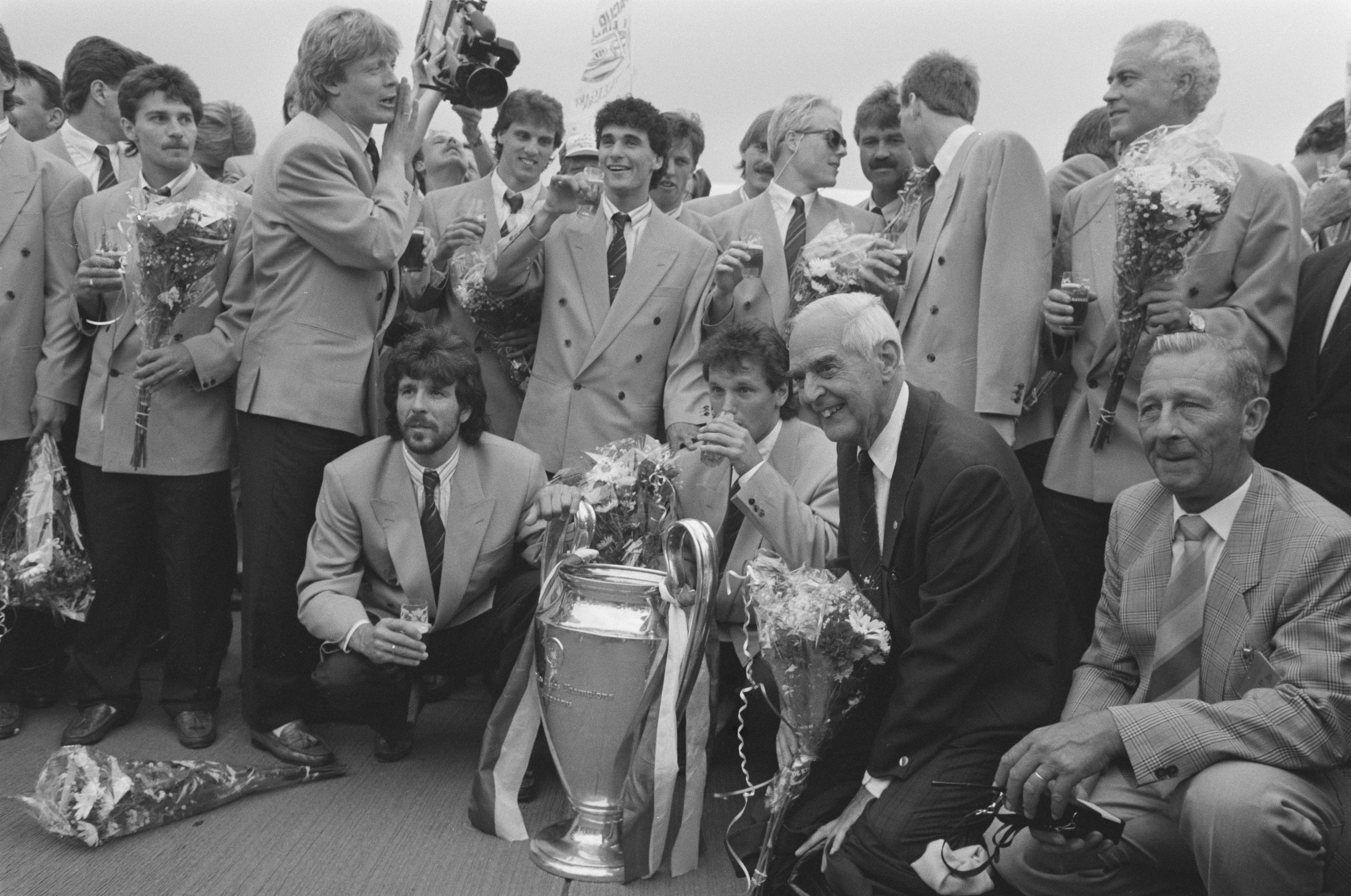
Players of PSV posing with the European Cup together with Frits Philips, chairman of the BOD of Philips, after their 1988 European Cup Final victory over Benfica in Stuttgart

A works team, sometimes also referred to as factory team and company team, is a sports team that is financed and run by a manufacturer or other business, institution, or organization in a broad sense. Works teams have very close ties with their main sponsor and owner, and usually incorporate its logo, its name, or both, in the sport club or team logo. Sometimes, works teams contain or are entirely made up of employees of the supporting company. In motorsport, a works team or factory team is a manufacturer that builds its own car or motorbike including the engine.

Company teams are owned, sponsored and managed by companies in order to raise awareness about those companies' brands, being usually named after those companies and brands as part and parcel of those companies' marketing strategy. Sometimes a single company (e.g. Red Bull GmbH) owns more than one team named after it competing in different sports or even in the same sport.

When they meet certain criteria, college and university teams, also known sometimes as student teams, competing in semi-professional or professional leagues and championships, instead of exclusively competing in university/college level sport, have been considered works teams as well. In some regions of the world like Europe and Latin America, university/college sports teams are in many instances fully-integrated in the same national sports league or championship system where amateur, semi-professional and professional teams and athletes compete in one of many divisions of the system's pyramid.

Many works teams, factory teams or student teams were started to give staff or students some exercise and entertainment and eventually became professional teams without actually having workers, factory workers or students in their squads, but retained their original names to reflect their historical background.

== By sport ==
=== American football ===
Works teams were common in the early days of professional football. The Columbus Panhandles were a famous works team; it consisted of Pennsylvania Railroad employees, including the famed Nesser Brothers, and eventually became a charter member of the National Football League.

The Green Bay Packers obtained its name through company sponsorship from a meat packing company named the Indian Packing Company and its employee and team founder, Curly Lambeau. The Chicago Bears was established by the A. E. Staley food starch company of Decatur, Illinois, as a company team under the name 'Decatur Staleys'.

The National Public Safety Football League is a modern-day example of a league of works teams, with each team in the league consisting of employees of a public department (usually police or fire) in a given city.

This tradition is continued by some teams in the X-League, the highest level of American football in Japan; examples include the IBM Big Blue and Fujitsu Frontiers.

=== Association football ===
==== Africa ====
Former and current works teams in Africa include Arab Contractors SC of Egypt (also a sporting club) and AS Police (Benin). Horseed FC is based in Horseed, Somalia. A seven-time champion of the Somalia League, it is a former army team. Other works teams that have played in the Somali football leagues include Banaadir Telecom, Ports Authority, and Somali Police.

A number of works teams were founded in the former Portuguese territory of Mozambique that still are currently major teams in that Portuguese-speaking African country (independent since 1975). Grupo Desportivo da Companhia Têxtil do Punguè and Textáfrica do Chimoio are examples of two works teams which were the teams of two textile companies. In addition, two major teams of the railway network also achieved notoriety – the Clube Ferroviário de Maputo and the Clube Ferroviário da Beira.

==== Asia ====
Current and former Asian works teams include Nepal Police Club, Thai Farmers Bank F.C., Krung Thai Bank F.C., Viettel F.C. (formerly The Cong), or the football team of the Vietnam People's Army, as well as United City FC which was once the works team of Vallacar Transit Inc.

===== China =====
In China, there are several works teams or company teams playing in the top professional competitions. These include Beijing Guoan F.C., Changchun Yatai F.C., Guangzhou F.C., Tianjin Jinmen Tiger F.C. and Shanghai Port F.C.

===== India =====
Dempo SC is owned and sponsored by the Dempo Mining Corporation Limited. ASEB Sports Club and Oil India FC are other examples of company teams. In the past, JCT FC was owned by JCT Mills.

===== Iran =====
In Iran current and former work teams include the Zob Ahan Esfahan F.C., affiliated with a steel factory in Isfahan and Sepahan S.C., owned by Mobarake Steel company. There are many other teams in Iran that are factory, company and workers teams including, Aluminium Arak F.C., Paykan F.C., Foolad F.C., Sanat Naft Abadan F.C., F.C. Nassaji Mazandaran, Gol Gohar Sirjan F.C.

===== Japan =====
Works teams are common in Japan, with several J.League clubs starting life as a member of the amateur Japan Soccer League (e.g., Yokohama F. Marinos, who were originally Nissan F.C.). Modern examples include Honda F.C., Mitsubishi Motors Mizushima, Sony Sendai, Tokushima Vortis (founded in 1955 as Otsuka Pharmaceutical Co., Ltd. Soccer Club) and Maruyasu Okazaki. The highest league Japanese works teams can compete in is the Japan Football League, the de facto national fourth division; the J. League specifically bars works teams from its ranks unless they professionalise and adopt the community they play in as a source of fan support. Yokohama FC is owned by Japanese restaurant operator Onodera Group (which became also a majority shareholder of Portuguese club UD Oliveirense in November 2022) and thus can be described as a company team as well.

===== Pakistan =====
Football in Pakistan has been dominated by works teams (also known as departments). The National Football Championship, which was the men's highest level football competition from 1948 to 2003 was contested among the regional associations along with departmental teams. After the introduction of the Pakistan Premier League in 2004, works teams continued to dominate the domestic competitions.

Majority of the works teams were disbanded following the shutdown of departmental sports in Pakistan in September 2021. Departmental sports in Pakistan were restored in August 2022.

===== South Korea =====
Current and former works teams in South Korea include Busan Transportation Corporation FC, Gyeongju Korea Hydro & Nuclear Power FC, Ulsan Hyundai Mipo Dolphin FC, and Hanil Bank FC. Jeonbuk Hyundai Motors, Ulsan HD FC, Seoul E-Land FC and Suwon Samsung Bluewings are prominent company teams in South Korea.

===== Taiwan =====
Tatung F.C., a Taiwanese professional football club based in Taipei, was affiliated with the Tatung electronics company. Taiwan Power Company F.C. is owned by the Taiwan Power Company.

==== Europe ====
European former works teams that later would become noteworthy professional company teams include those of PSV Eindhoven (Philips), FC Sochaux-Montbéliard (Peugeot), Bayer Leverkusen (Bayer), VfL Wolfsburg (Volkswagen) and FC Carl Zeiss Jena (Carl Zeiss). Most of them are still company teams owned by the company which founded the sports club in the past. Founded, sponsored and owned by Red Bull GmbH, which uses the sports teams as part and parcel of its products' marketing strategy, RB Leipzig and FC Red Bull Salzburg became noted examples of European company teams at the start of the 21st century.

===== France =====
FC Sochaux-Montbéliard (Peugeot), Evian Thonon Gaillard F.C. (Groupe Danone) and Paris FC (LVMH) are examples of notable works or company teams from France historically or currently linked to well-known multinational companies.

===== Germany =====
Bayer Leverkusen (Bayer), VfL Wolfsburg (Volkswagen), FC Carl Zeiss Jena (Carl Zeiss), TSG 1899 Hoffenheim (SAP's Dietmar Hopp) and RB Leipzig (Red Bull GmbH), founded, sponsored or owned by companies or company founders, are examples of German works teams or company teams.

===== Hungary =====
The name of the football club Videoton FC (Hungary) comes from a Hungarian contract electronics manufacturer. The club, founded in 1941 by the defence manufacturing company Székesfehérvári Vadásztölténygyár, was made up of workers of the local factory in its early years.

===== Ireland =====
In the League of Ireland a number of early clubs, including St James's Gate F.C., Fordsons, Jacobs, Midland Athletic and Dundalk all had their origins as a factory or works team.

===== Italy =====
In Italy, football teams such as Parma A.C. and Juventus were respectively known for years as company teams of Parmalat and FIAT. Actual company or works teams from Italy include FeralpiSalò, owned by ironworks company Feralpi Group.

===== Moldova =====
FC Sheriff Tiraspol is based in the capital of Transnistria, was founded by the Sheriff security company in 1997.

===== Netherlands =====
Philips Sport Vereniging (PSV) was founded, owned and sponsored within the Philips business universe.

===== Portugal =====
The Portuguese conglomerate Companhia União Fabril (CUF) had also its own sports club, founded as a true works team in 1937. It was located in the Lisbon's industrial suburb of Barreiro, and was called Grupo Desportivo da CUF. A multisport club, besides top flight football, it housed competitive rink hockey, cycling and rowing teams and departments, among others. The club, which was a major contender in the main Portuguese Football Championship, was disbanded and replaced by G.D. Fabril due to Carnation Revolution, a military coup in 1974. Other examples include the Grupo Desportivo Riopele founded in 1958 in Vila Nova de Famalicão which was the works team of the Riopele textile factory, as well as the sport club established by the Argozelo Mines in 1975 and called Centro Cultural e Desportivo Minas de Argozelo. Florgrade FC, established in 2014, was founded and is owned by a Portuguese cork industry company with the same name.

===== Romania =====
In Romania, Rapid Bucharest was founded in 1923 by a group workers of the Grivița workshops under the name of Asociația culturală și sportivă CFR ("CFR Cultural and Sports Association"). Fotbal Club CFR 1907 Cluj was founded in 1907, when the city of Cluj-Napoca was part of Austro-Hungarian Empire, under the name Cluj Railway Sports Club (Kolozsvári Vasutas Sport Club). From 1907 to 1910, the team played in the municipal championship.

===== Spain =====
The oldest football club in Spain is Recreativo de Huelva, formed on 23 December 1889 by Dr. William Alexander Mackay and British workers employed by the Rio Tinto Company. Sevilla FC, started as a team made up of workers from the Seville Water Works, while Atlético Madrid was, from 1939 to 1947, called Athletic Aviación de Madrid, having merged with Aviación Nacional of Zaragoza, founded in 1939 by members of the Spanish Air Force.

===== Ukraine =====
Most of the Ukrainian Premier League clubs in Ukraine trace their roots to factory teams among several there is FC Dnipro Dnipropetrovsk that was originally formed as factory team of Bryanka Factory (today Dnipropetrovsk Metallurgical Plant). FC Shakhtar Horlivka traces its roots to the Football Association of the Gorlovka Artillery Works (FOGAZ). In times of the Soviet Union until the 1960s in Kyiv was a sports club of Arsenal Factory, SC Arsenal Kyiv, which fielded a number of teams in various sports such as association football and hockey, among others. In 2001, there was an attempt to revive the club by the Kyiv city authorities (see FC Arsenal Kyiv). FC Zirka Kropyvnytskyi was originally formed by the Elvorti Factory personnel and after the Communist revolution it was renamed along with the factory. FC Zorya Luhansk was formed at the October Revolution Locomotive Factory (today Luhanskteplovoz). FC Metalist Kharkiv was formed at the Kharkiv Locomotive Factory (today Malyshev Factory). There also was a factory team of the Donetsk Steel Works (see FC Metalurh Donetsk). At the KryvbasOre (today Kryvyi Rih Iron Ore Association) were created such teams like FC Hirnyk Kryvyi Rih and FC Kryvbas Kryvyi Rih. FC Metalurh Zaporizhia traces its roots to the team of Zaporizhstal. FC Motor Zaporizhzhia is another football team from Zaporizhzhia which is owned by the Ukrainian aircraft engine manufacturer Motor Sich. FC Torpedo Zaporizhia traces its roots to the team of ZAZ car factory.

===== United Kingdom =====
Several professional football clubs in the United Kingdom were also formed as works teams, including Manchester United (the team of the Lancashire and Yorkshire Railway depot at Newton Heath), Arsenal (formed as Dial Square in 1886 by workers at the Royal Arsenal in Woolwich), West Ham United (formerly Thames Ironworks), Coventry City, founded by workers of the Singer bicycle company, and the Scottish team Livingston (formerly Ferranti Thistle).

A few amateur and semi-professional United Kingdom association football (soccer) works teams retain their companies' names, including Airbus UK, Cammell Laird, and Vauxhall Motors. Other former and current amateur and semi-professional UK works teams include Crawley Down Gatwick F.C., Civil Service F.C., Harrogate Railway Athletic F.C., United Services Portsmouth F.C., Metropolitan Police F.C., Stewarts & Lloyds Corby A.F.C., Royal Engineers A.F.C., Atherton Collieries A.F.C., Prescot Cables F.C., Stocksbridge Park Steels F.C. and Cardiff Civil Service. Bath City Football Club from Somerset, England, was formed in 1889 as Bath A.F.C. The team changed its name to Bath Railway in 1902, before settling on the name Bath City F.C. Included among Scottish non-league and amateur works teams are Inverurie Loco Works F.C., Colville Park A.F.C. (Ravenscraig steelworks), Shawfield Amateurs (White's Chemical Works) and Burntisland Shipyard A.F.C., while Glynhill Moorcroft A.F.C. began as Babcock & Wilcox F.C., the works team of the Renfrew engineering company.

In Northern Ireland, several companies whose names are retained by local football teams, such as Sirocco Works F.C., Goodyear F.C., and Ford F.C., have closed down, yet the football clubs themselves remain active. A defunct Northern Irish works team is Fisher Body F.C. Linfield F.C. was founded in Sandy Row in March 1886 by workers from the Ulster Spinning Company's Linfield Mill. Originally named the Linfield Athletic Club, its playing ground, "the Meadow", was situated behind the mill. Lisburn Distillery F.C. was created as Distillery by employees of Dunville's Royal Irish Distillery in Grosvenor Street, Belfast in July 1879. Short Brothers F.C. originated as a works team of the Short Brothers aircraft manufacturing company in Belfast.

===== Former European countries =====
====== Former SFR Yugoslavia ======
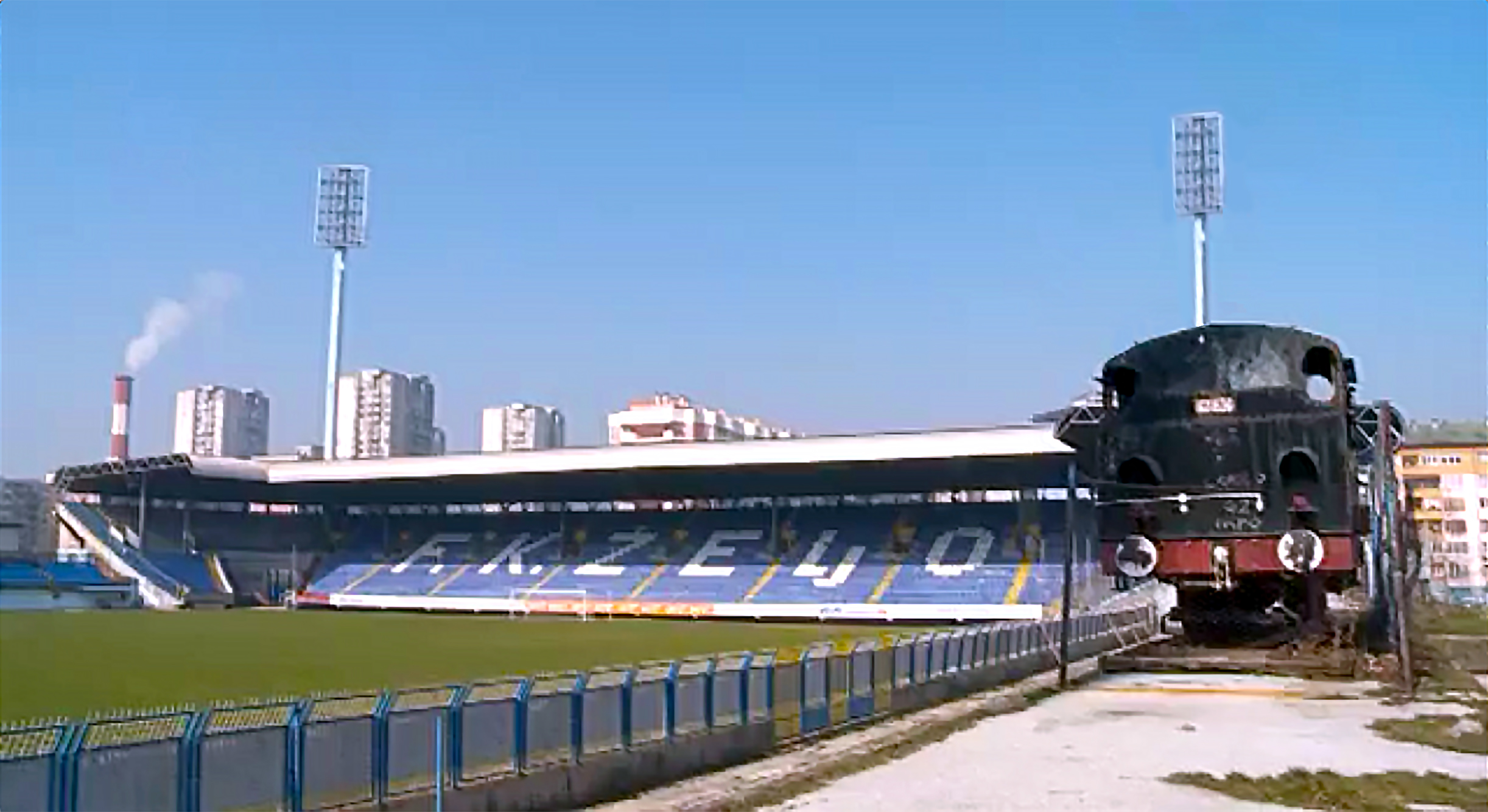
The locomotive at the stadium of FK Željezničar, formed by railway employees.

Fudbalski klub Željezničar (English: Football Club Željezničar) is a Bosnian professional football club based in Sarajevo, Bosnia and Herzegovina. The name Željezničar means "railway worker", because it was established by a group of railway workers. Another working-class football club from Bosnia is NK Čelik (lit. transl. FC Steel) from Zenica, which was founded by the workers of the iron and steel mill in Zenica. Being a mineral-rich country, with many mines all over Bosnia, led to establishment of several clubs named FK Rudar (transl. FC Miner), such as FK Rudar Prijedor, FK Rudar Ugljevik, FK Rudar Kakanj, and FK Rudar Breza, while other clubs are simply called FK Radnik or FK Radnički (transl. Laborer – transl. Worker's), such as FK Radnik Bijeljina, FK Radnik Hadžići, and FK Radnički Lukavac.

More clubs in former Yugoslavia were formed by Yugoslav Railways employees, for instance, Serbian club ŽAK Subotica (Železničarski atletski klub Subotica, translation Railways athletic club Subotica) was a club formed and backed throughout its existence by the railways company. It was dissolved in 1945. In its place the new socialist authorities which replaced the monarchy in Yugoslavia formed FK Spartak Subotica which kept tight links with the railways company. Željezničar Sarajevo, ŽAK Subotica and Spartak Subotica are the railways-backed clubs with best performances in the league, but besides these there were many others such as ŽAK Kikinda, Železničar Belgrade, Železničar Smederevo, Železničar Lajkovac, Železničar Niš, in Serbia, and Željezničar Doboj in Bosnia. In other parts of Yugoslavia there are other cases, in North Macedonia, FK Rabotnički became owned in 1949 by the labour union of the railways company. The link between the club and the railways was kept ever since with their followers even nowadays are known as Železničari and the railways simbol is part of club's logo. In Slovenia the railways had one club in each one of the two main Slovenian cites, NK Železničar Maribor and NK Železničar Ljubljana. In relation with railways, Serbian club GFK Jasenica 1911 became known during the 1970s, 1980s and 1990s as FK Mladost GOŠA because at that period the club was backed by the GOŠA, a former train wagons factory from Smederevska Palanka.

Other cases in Yugoslavia include HNK Borovo, which was formed in 1933 as SK BATA Borovo. The club was formed as the promotional team for the Bata Shoes factory in Borovo and it was founded by the BATA company founder, Tomáš Baťa himself. The company had already earlier in 1922 became owner of the Czech club FC Zlín which was known between 1924 and 1948 as SK Bata Zlin.

The best well known success story of a company and football club connection in Yugoslavia was the one of FK Zemun. Zemun, a city just in the outskirts of capital Belgrade, was known for many home-born notable players and some more or less successful football clubs ever since first half of the 1920s. SK Sparta Zemun played in the Yugoslav First League still in the 1930s. However, two decades after the end of the Second World War, the city had just a big number of small lower-leagues clubs. At that time Zemun was also home of Galenika a.d., a leading pharmaceutical company in Yugoslavia and one of the major of all South-Eastern Europe. The company owned a small club, FK Galenika, however by the late 1960s they decided to play a bigger role in football. FK Jedinstvo Zemun was at time the leading club in the city. In 1962 they achieved promotion to the Yugoslav Second League but they managed to stay at that level just two seasons. In 1969 they were playing third level, the Serbian Republic League, and were struggling financially. It was then that Galenika decided to take over the club and by merging it with its own minor club they formed FK Galenika Zemun. The company injected resources and backed the club financially, and the results immediately stated to show up. Right in the first season the club managed promotion back to the Yugoslav Second League where they will become among the strongest teams in the following decade. After several failed attempts Galenika Zemun achieved promotion to the Yugoslav First League in 1982 and that same year they reached the semi-finals of the Yugoslav Cup. Playing in the Yugoslav top level, during the 1980s the club played side-by-side with the big ones such as Red Star, Partizan Belgrade, Hajduk Split or Dinamo Zagreb, and Yugoslav football fans all became well aware of the name FK Galenika Zemun. Later, by the early 1990s the wars and the break-up of Yugoslavia started, Galenika suffered the financially asphyxiating consequences of the economic sanctions imposed to Serbia. The company had to drop its backing to the club and the club dropped the company name and became known just as FK Zemun. They managed to survive for some time during the 1990s in the First League of FR Yugoslavia, however the results were being worse each year, and by the turn of the millennium FK Zemun was relegated to the lower-leagues with just few occasional but flashy and inconsistent comebacks. Easy to conclude how the presence of Galenika in the club was fundamental for them to archive results and stability and without them Zemun supporters can only remember nostalgically the period when the club had its golden era thanks to the perfect wedding with a major local pharmaceutical company.

One of those minor clubs that emerged in Zemun was SK Naša Krila Zemun (Naša Krila means Our Wings), which existed only for three years between 1947 and 1950, and was formed and owned by the Yugoslav Air Force. The club managed to achieve an impressive record for such a short existence, making its presence in two seasons in the Yugoslav First League and reaching the Yugoslav Cup final in 1947 and 1949. While the Yugoslav Air Force created its club in Serbia in Zemun, a suburb of the capital Belgrade, the Yugoslav Navy created their club in Croatia, in the major Yugoslav port, Split, and named it NK Mornar Split. However, just as Naša Krila, the club was short-lived: it was formed in 1946 and disbanded two years later, and by the 1960s a new club, which was formed by a merger of a number of smaller ones, was making its way to the high end of Yugoslav football.

Serbian club FK Smederevo 1924 was founded as a local iron factory SARTID football team. The club will be known by the company name since its foundation, in 1924, until 1944 when it became nationalised. In 1992, it will restore the name Sartid just as the club ownership returned to the Sartid metallurgical company and this state of affairs will remain till 2004, the year the company, by then now owned by U.S. Steel, left the direction of the club.

There are many other cases in Serbia, specially among medium-size clubs and their main local companies, such as FK Čukarički (known as Čukarički Stankom between 2001 and 2011 when it was owned by Stankom company), FK Hajduk Kula (known as FK Hajduk Rodić during the period it was backed by the Rodić company), FK Javor Ivanjica (known since summer 2014 as FK Javor Matis due to its backing from local Matis company), FK Sloboda Užice (known as FK Sloboda Point Sevojno after its merger with FK Sevojno in 2010 and backing from Point company), ČSK Čelarevo (also known as ČSK Pivara, owned and closely related throughout its history by beer manufacturer Pivara Čelarevo), FK Mladost Apatin (formed by the owner of a local clothing factory Tri Zvezde, it was named since its foundation in 1924 till 1950 as SK Tri Zvezde and during that time most of the players of the squad were also employees at the factory).

====== Former Soviet Union ======
A widespread works team system formed the basis of amateur sport in the Soviet Union, with virtually all workplaces and industries having sport teams. The system also provided the support for de facto professional athletes, who were employees of various non-sport agencies and enterprises and officially designated as amateurs.

==== North America ====
Bethlehem Steel F.C., which holds a record number of U.S. Open Cup wins, was the factory team of the Bethlehem Steel Corporation in Pennsylvania. The New York Red Bulls is a well-known company team in the US.

===== Mexico =====
One of the most popular teams in Mexico, Cruz Azul, is a works team owned by Cooperativa La Cruz Azul, an industrial cement company. The team was formed on 22 May 1927 by some of the company's workers.

==== South America ====
===== Argentina =====
Several Argentinian clubs began life as the works teams of British-owned railway companies, including Rosario Central, Talleres de Córdoba, Ferro Carril Oeste, Club Ferrocarril Midland and Club Atlético Central Córdoba. Club Deportivo Mandiyú, also referred to as Mandiyú, is an Argentine football club, based in Corrientes, in the Province of the same name. The club was founded under the name "Club Deportivo Tipoiti" on 14 December 1952, by a group of textile workers from the Tipoiti textile factory in Corrientes, Argentina. Because the Argentine Football Association did not accept commercial company names, the club had to change its name to "Club Deportivo Mandiyú", which means cotton in the indigenous language of Guaraní.

===== Brazil =====
In Brazil, clubs that were born as works teams include São Paulo Railway (now Nacional), Cotonifício Rodolfo Crespi (now Juventus), Sport Club Corinthians Paulista (also a sporting club, formed by railway workers), and Bangu. Artsul (concrete industry), Icasa (cotton industry) and Red Bull Bragantino (energy drink industry) are examples of football teams established and backed by companies, also known as company teams.

===== Ecuador =====
In Ecuador, a perfect example of a works team is CS Emelec, which was founded by the Empresa Eléctrica del Ecuador, Guayaquil's first electric company. For several decades, Emelec's players and directors were employees in the company, though such involvement decreased gradually until the company eventually folded in the 2000s (decade), the club being de facto autonomous for decades before. Sociedad Deportiva Aucas is another important works team in Ecuador. Historically the most popular team in Quito, Aucas was founded and initially integrated and financed by employees of Royal Dutch Shell. They named the club after the Huaorani tribes that they encountered while prospecting for oil in the Ecuadorian Amazonian jungles.

===== Peru =====
In Peru, Club Alianza Lima was founded as Sport Alianza in 1901 by workers in the Alianza Racing Horse Stud, then property of two-time President of Peru Augusto B. Leguía.

===== Uruguay =====
Uruguay has one of the best known clubs that began as a works team: Central Uruguay Railway Cricket Club, or just CURCC, which was the basis for the later foundation of Peñarol, one of the top two clubs in that country.

=== Baseball ===
In the early days of baseball, most teams were composed of amateurs, and many of these teams were composed of players who worked for a business, such as a factory or railroad yard. As the profile of the sport rose, professional teams began to dominate and the factory teams faded away.

In Japan, teams playing in the Nippon Professional Baseball leagues, like the Fukuoka SoftBank Hawks, a prominent professional baseball team owned by the SoftBank Group, are company teams which employ the name of their owners in their official team names and logos. Other company teams belonging to major corporations competing in the main Japanese professional baseball leagues include Chiba Lotte Marines (Lotte Holdings), Hokkaido Nippon-Ham Fighters (Nippon Ham Co., Ltd), Tohoku Rakuten Golden Eagles (Rakuten) and Tokyo Yakult Swallows (Yakult Honsha), among others.

In Japan, non-professional baseball is known as Shakai-Jin Yakyū (社会人野球, Shakaijinyakyuu; english: Baseball of Society Members).

Amateur baseball leagues exist all over Japan, with many teams sponsored by (or being part of) companies. Because of that, it is usually referred to in English as Industrial Baseball. Non-professional baseball is governed by the Japan Amateur Baseball Association (JABA). Players on these teams usually are employed by their sponsoring companies and receive salaries as company employees, not as baseball players. However, in recent years, JABA has allowed corporate-related teams to have an X number of players that can be hired and paid full-time to just play baseball, thus making it more semi-professional than amateur.

The best teams in these circuits are determined via tournaments and leagues that lead qualification for three tournaments: the Intercity baseball tournament, the Amateur club national championship and the Industrial League national tournament. Corporate teams are allowed to play only the Intercity and the Industrial National Tournaments.

The level of play in Japanese industrial baseball is very competitive; Industrial League players are often drafted to NPB, are selected to represent Japan in international tournaments when NPB players are not available to play, and Major League Baseball players such as Hideo Nomo (Shin-Nitetsu Sakai), Junichi Tazawa (Nippon Oil) and Kosuke Fukudome (Nihon Seimei), had started their professional careers playing industrial baseball.

=== Basketball ===
==== Philippines ====
Most professional sports teams in the Philippines until recently, have been owned by companies, and leagues are exclusively participated at by these teams. Examples of such leagues include the Philippine Basketball Association, and formerly the Manila Industrial and Commercial Athletic Association and the Philippine Basketball League.

Recent developments saw the emergence of leagues with teams based on localities, such as the Maharlika Pilipinas Basketball League and the National Basketball League.

==== Portugal ====
The Clube Portugal Telecom, commonly known as Portugal Telecom, was a basketball team based in Lisbon, Portugal. The club, a company team, was founded in 1996 and was owned by Portugal Telecom, the largest telecommunications service provider in the country. It was dissolved in 2003.

==== United States ====
During the sport's early years of existence, some of the teams that were competing in professional basketball leagues were works teams. Some of the more well-known examples of such teams existing in professional basketball leagues include the original American Basketball League's Washington Palace Five (sometimes referred to as the Washington Laundrymen), Toledo Red Man Tobaccos (sometimes referred to as the Toledo Redmen), and Washington Brewers (formerly known as the Washington Heurichs and the Washington Heurich Brewers) and the National Basketball League's Akron Firestone Non-Skids, Akron Goodyear Wingfoots, Fort Wayne Zollner Pistons, and Indianapolis Kautskys, with the latter two teams eventually converting themselves into being proper professional basketball teams out in the Basketball Association of America as the Fort Wayne Pistons (now Detroit Pistons) and Indianapolis Jets respectively.

=== Cycling ===
Many Union Cycliste Internationale (UCI) professional cycling teams are owned, sponsored and managed by companies in order to raise awareness of those companies' brands. These cycling teams are usually named after those companies and brands in a premeditated attempt to boost those companies' marketing strategy. Examples of this have been found in many different geographical locations and markets around the world and throughout the history of the sport. UCI WorldTeam is the term used by the UCI to name a cycling team of the highest category in professional road cycling and many have been backed by commercial brands to such an extent that the team name became interchangeable with the commercial brand behind it. Until the mid-1950s professional cycling sponsorship was limited to manufacturing companies in the bicycle business. In 1954, when the European post-war bike boom ended, European bike companies became financially stressed. In 1953, the Ganna bike company's racing team told its top rider Fiorenzo Magni that it would be unable to maintain the team in the following season. Magni was well-connected with the German Nivea brand because the riders used Nivea products to soften the chamois in their shorts. When Magni signed the cosmetic company as his team's title sponsor, he spearheaded a new trend in cycling where teams became part and parcel of many companies' marketing strategy. Peugeot's cycling team, a fully-fledged factory team or company team in cycling by definition since Peugeot founded the team and produced its bikes, is listed on cyclingranking.com as the most successful cycling team of all time, with a large margin on the second placed team, Alcyon (started by Alcyon, a French bicycle, automobile and motorcycle manufacturer).

=== Rugby union ===
Currently the strongest works teams are in Asia. The Top League in Japan features teams such as Suntory Sungoliath, Toyota Verblitz and IBM Big Blue. Samsung has a team in the Korean league.

United Kingdom's rugby union too has a works team tradition going back many decades, and although the clubs have declined post professionalism in heartland countries, it has not been completely extinguished. As late as 1988 the Wales captain played his club rugby for South Wales Police. As of 2017, Tata Steel play in the Second Flight of the WRU Club Pyramid. The British Army still plays occasional matches against clubs, and has won the Middlesex Sevens in the 2000s.

== Works or factory teams in motorsport ==
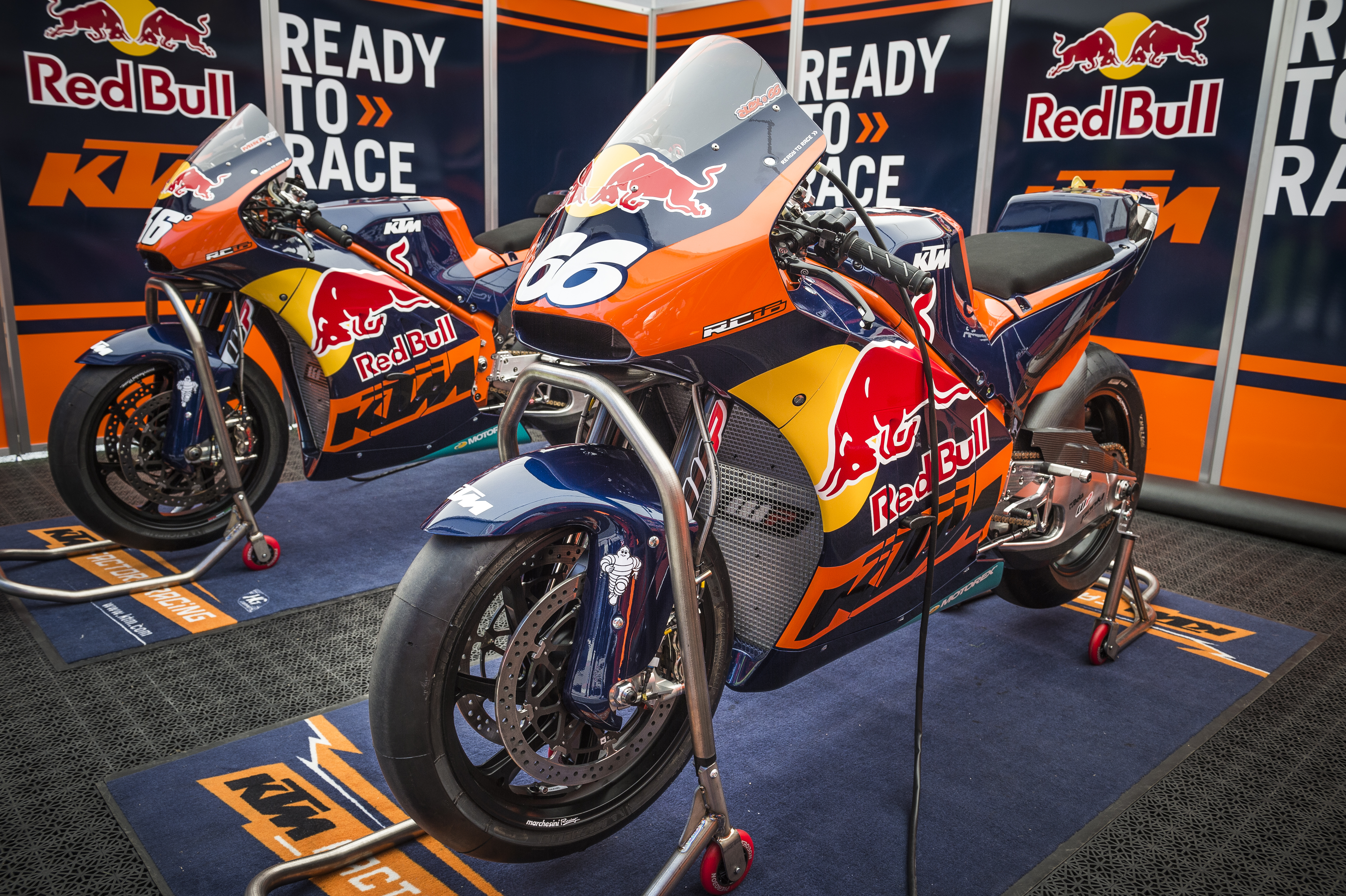
Red Bull KTM Factory Racing, a joint factory-backed team of KTM and company team of Red Bull in Grand Prix motorcycle racing.

In motorsport, the most well-established or traditional definition of a works team or factory-backed team is a manufacturer that builds its own car or motorbike including the engine. In a broader sense, it can also be any team that is financed and run by a manufacturer or other business, institution, or organization. Scuderia Ferrari is a notable example of a works team or factory-backed team in Formula One. Several factory-backed motorcycle racing and World Rally Championship teams exist as well. The creation of the World Sports Car Championship in 1953 changed motorsport deeply and was marked by the establishment of teams like Ferrari, Aston Martin, Mercedes-Benz, and Jaguar, which began to enter multiple factory backed cars or works cars to compete. Red Bull GmbH entered Formula One in 2005 after creating its own company team Red Bull Racing, and in 2022 had started the development of comprehensive in-house capabilities in order to secure the production of its own powertrains by 2026. In the 2010s, many works teams, also known as factory-backed teams in the context of motorsport, entered the newly created Formula E open-wheel electric motorsport series.

== Professional or semi-professional college and university teams ==
A number of college and university teams around the world have played professionally or semi-professionally while competing in the main top level leagues and championships of their countries instead of competing in university/college level sport. This includes:

- Chile: Club Deportivo Universidad Católica; Club Universidad de Chile
- China: Beijing Institute of Technology F.C.
- Ireland: University College Dublin A.F.C.; University College Cork A.F.C.
- Mexico: Club Universidad de Guadalajara; Club Universidad Nacional; Tigres UANL
- Moldova: FC Academia Chișinău
- Portugal: AEIS Agronomia (student's union); Associação Académica de Coimbra (student's union); CDUL; CDUP; C. R. Técnico
- Romania: FC Politehnica Iași; FC Politehnica Timișoara; FC Universitatea Cluj; FC U Craiova
- South Africa: Bidvest Wits F.C.; University of Pretoria F.C.
- United Kingdom: Cardiff Metropolitan University F.C. (Inter Cardiff F.C. which was once called Inter CableTel A.F.C. after the CableTel company, merged with Cardiff Metropolitan University to form the club in 2000); Queen's University Belfast A.F.C.; University of Stirling Football Club

== See also ==
- Factory-backed
- Sports club
- Works sports clubs and teams, for lists of works teams in various sports
