= Rider-Lewis (automobile company) =

Defunct motor vehicle manufacturer

Rider Lewis Motor Car Company
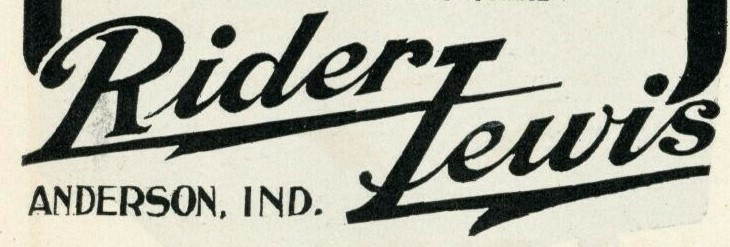
- Excellent Six
- Company type: Automobile manufacturer
- Industry: Automotive
- Founded: 1908; 118 years ago
- Founder: Ralph Lewis, George D. Rider
- Defunct: 1911; 115 years ago
- Successor: Factory: Nyberg Automobile
- Headquarters: Anderson, Indiana, United States
- Key people: Ralph Lewis, George D. Rider
- Products: Automobiles
- Production output: 250 approx. (1909-1911)

Rider-Lewis was a brass era automobile built first in Muncie and then Anderson, Indiana from 1908 to 1911.

== History ==
Ralph Lewis of Boston, designed an overhead valve, overhead cam six-cylinder engine of 40/45-hp. George D. Rider financed manufacturing and the Rider-Lewis Motor Car Company was established. Rider-Lewis introduced the automobile at the Indianapolis Motor Show in March 1908 priced at $2,500 (equivalent to $89,583 in 2025). Production began in Muncie in a converted factory, though in 1909 the company moved to a newly built factory in Anderson, Indiana.

For 1910 the "Excellent Six" was joined by a four-cylinder Model Four automobile selling for $1,050, equivalent to $36,281 in 2025 . In September 1910 the company was in receivership, though production continued. In October the Rider-Lewis property in Anderson was attached by court order when creditors thought Rider-Lewis was preparing to move out of state. A few more Model Fours were built into early 1911, but by March the Rider-Lewis plant was sold to Nyberg Motor Works.

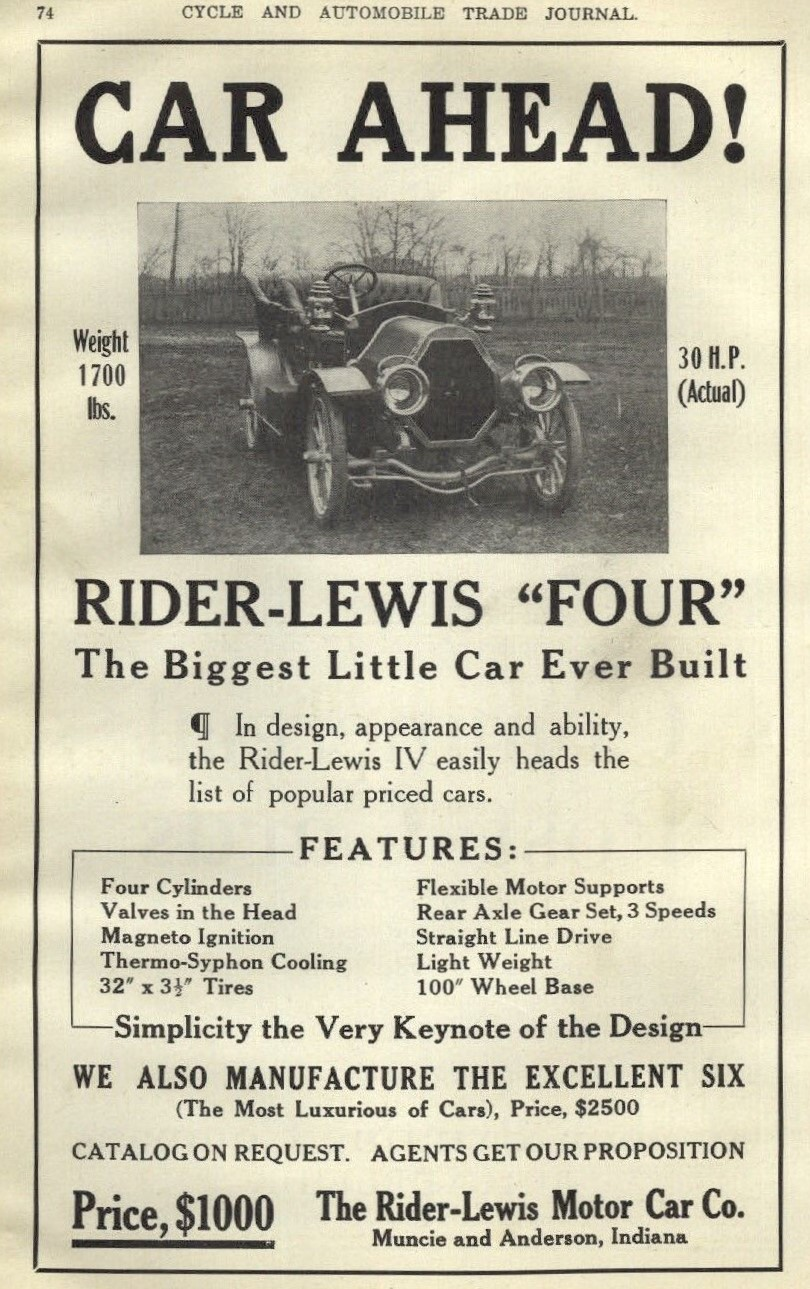
1909 Rider Lewis Four IV Advertisement

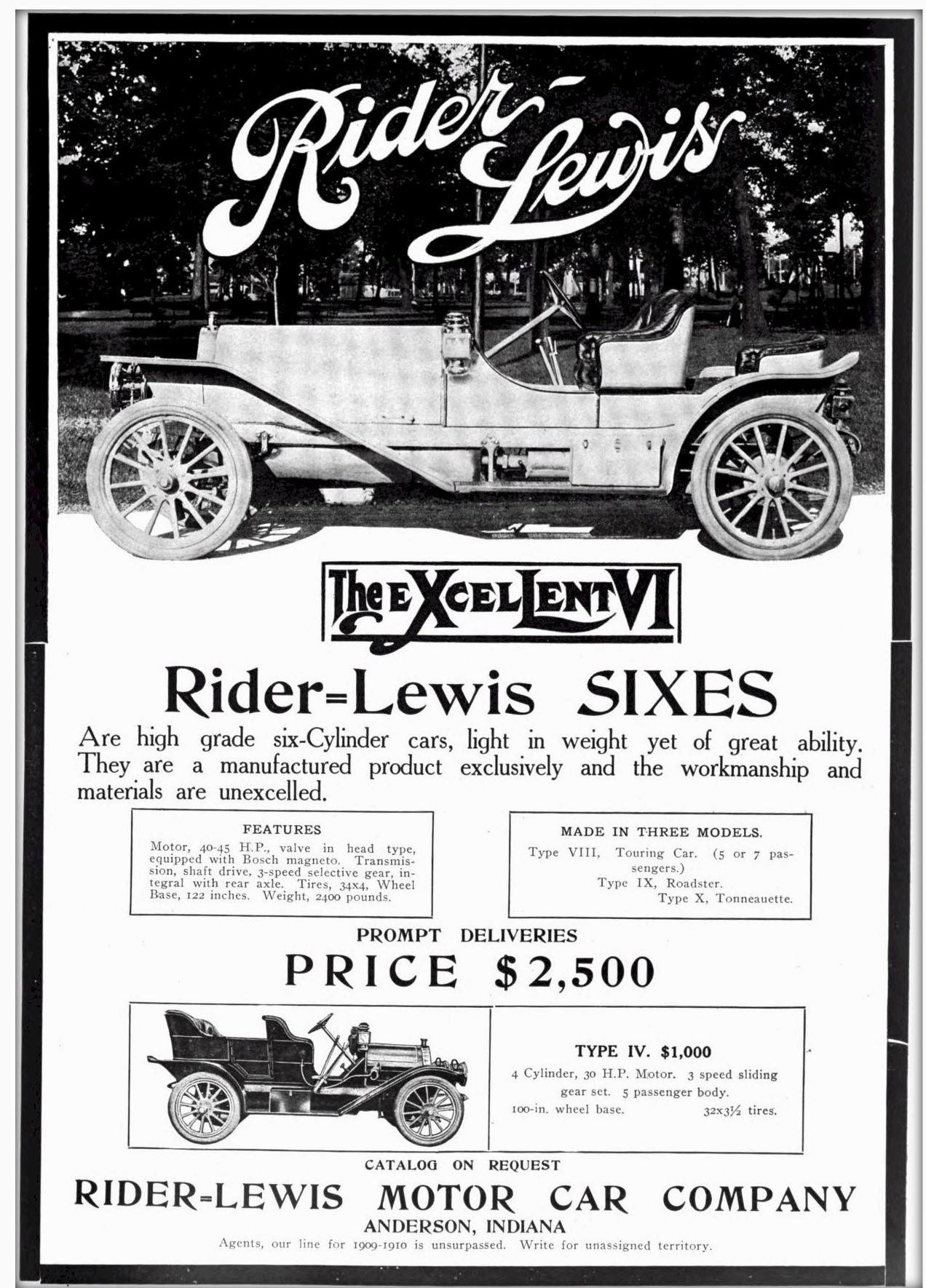
1909 Rider Lewis Six VI Advertisement
