= Nyberg Automobile =

Defunct American motor vehicle manufacturer

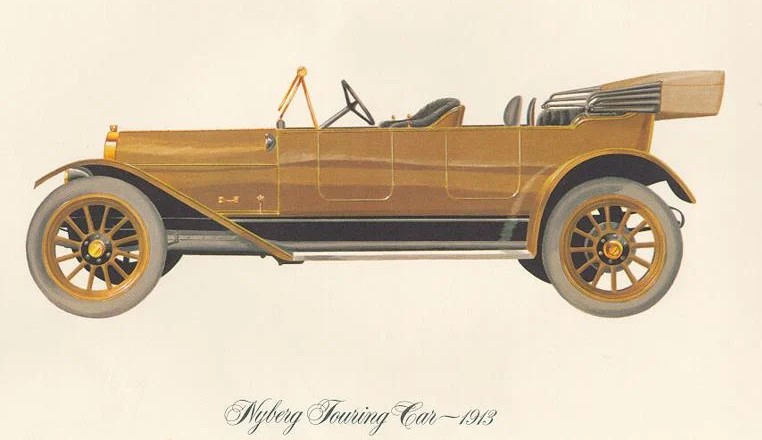
1913 Nyberg Touring Car from brochure

Nyberg was the name of a brass era American automobile built by Henry Nyberg of Chicago, Illinois, in Anderson, Indiana, and Chattanooga, Tennessee from 1911 to 1914.

== History ==
Henry Nyberg was born in 1872 in Hellvi on Gotland island, Sweden. He graduated from the Technical School in Malmo, and emigrated to the United States via Canada shortly thereafter. He built his first automobile in 1898 and established Nyberg Automobile Works in 1899. He lived in Kenosha, Wisconsin until 1902, and did work for Thomas B. Jeffery Company.

=== Nyberg Works – Chicago, Illinois ===
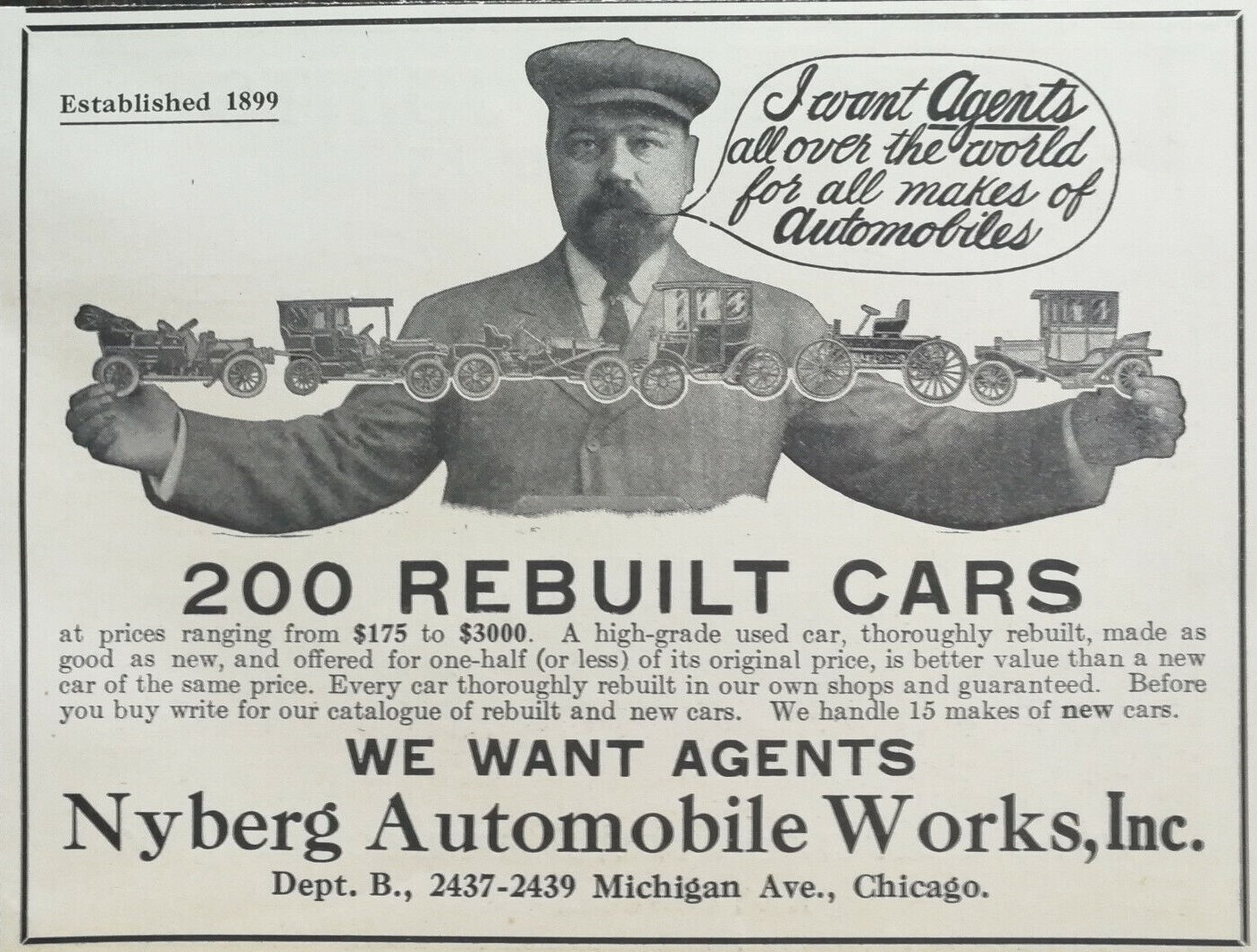
Henry Nyberg of Nyberg Automobile Works – Rebuilt Cars advertisement

In 1903, Nyberg moved his workshop to Chicago on East 18th Street. With an investor named Waller, he built the Nyberg or Nyberg-Waller single-cylinder runabout automobile and in 1904 moved to a bigger building on South Michigan Avenue, which was also known as Automobile Row. After one season of selling the runabout the business began repairing and selling used cars. In 1907, with a new investor, H. E. Jennings, Nyberg Automobile Works, Inc. was incorporated and moved to a larger building on South Michigan Avenue, with the main business of re-building and re-selling automobiles.

=== Nyberg Works – Anderson, Indiana ===
Nyberg Automobile Works
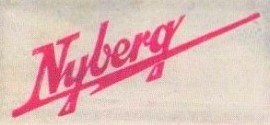

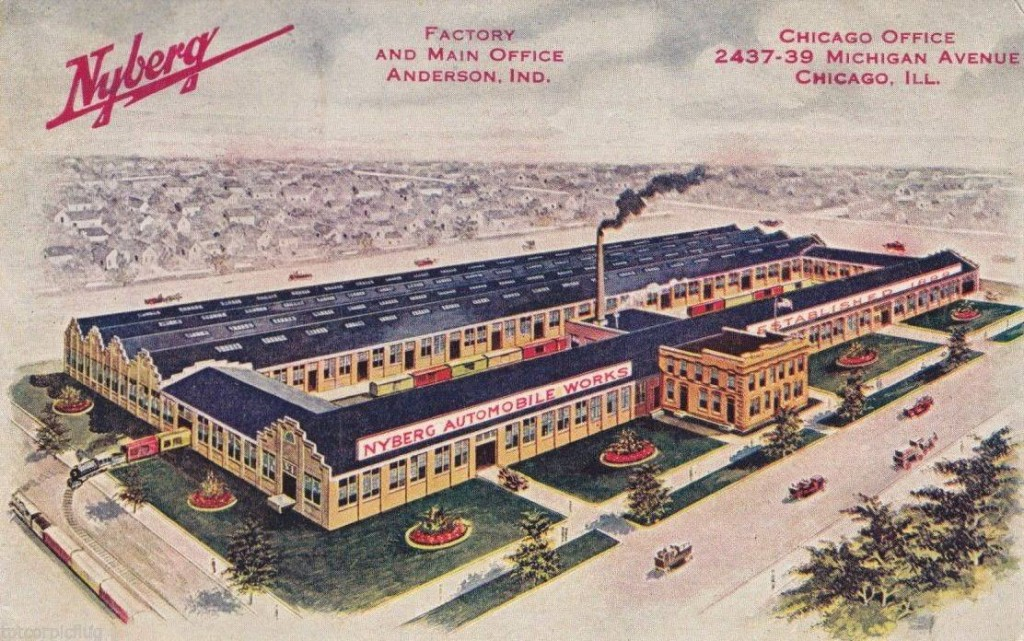
- Nyberg Factory in Anderson, IN
- Company type: Automobile manufacturer
- Industry: Automotive
- Founded: 1907; 119 years ago
- Founder: Henry Nyberg
- Defunct: 1919; 107 years ago
- Fate: Chicago works continued operating
- Headquarters: Chicago, Illinois, Anderson, Indiana, Chattanooga, Tennessee
- Products: Automobiles

Henry Nyberg and investors bought the Rider-Lewis automobile factory and equipment in Anderson, Indiana. Consolidated Automobile Company, later changed to Nyberg Automobile Company was the incorporation for the Anderson operations but it continued publicly to be called the Nyberg Automobile Works. The first Nyberg rolled out of the factory on March 30, 1911.

Nyberg's were largely "assembled cars", first offering a four-cylinder touring car and expanding to a six-cylinder car in 1912. Excelsior and Rutenber engines were used and cars were priced between $1,300 and $2,500,(equivalent to $83,405 in 2025). Roadsters and Touring cars were the staple product with limousines available. Nyberg experimented with a fire truck and several other truck products that were not pursued.

The factory built a racing car which Harry Endicott qualified and drove in the 1913 Indianapolis 500. The car finished 21st, retiring due to transmission failure.

=== Nyberg Works – Chattanooga, Tennessee ===
In February 1912, a manufacturing plant was established and a separate organization of the Nyberg Automobile Works was set up for Chattanooga. It started with a capital stock of $150,000 investment by C.E.James, John A. Patten, Z.C. Patten Jr., Henry Nyberg, F.H. Dowler and G. H. Miller. The plant employed 100 workers and expected to produce ten cars a week.

A Chattanooga built Nyberg Six-45 Tourabout ran the July, 1912 Indiana Four-States Tour, which covered a distance of 1,224.8 miles on roads in Ohio, West Virginia, Kentucky, and Indiana. The last two known Nybergs are located in Chattanooga, Tennessee on display at The Coker Museum at Honest Charley Speed Shop.

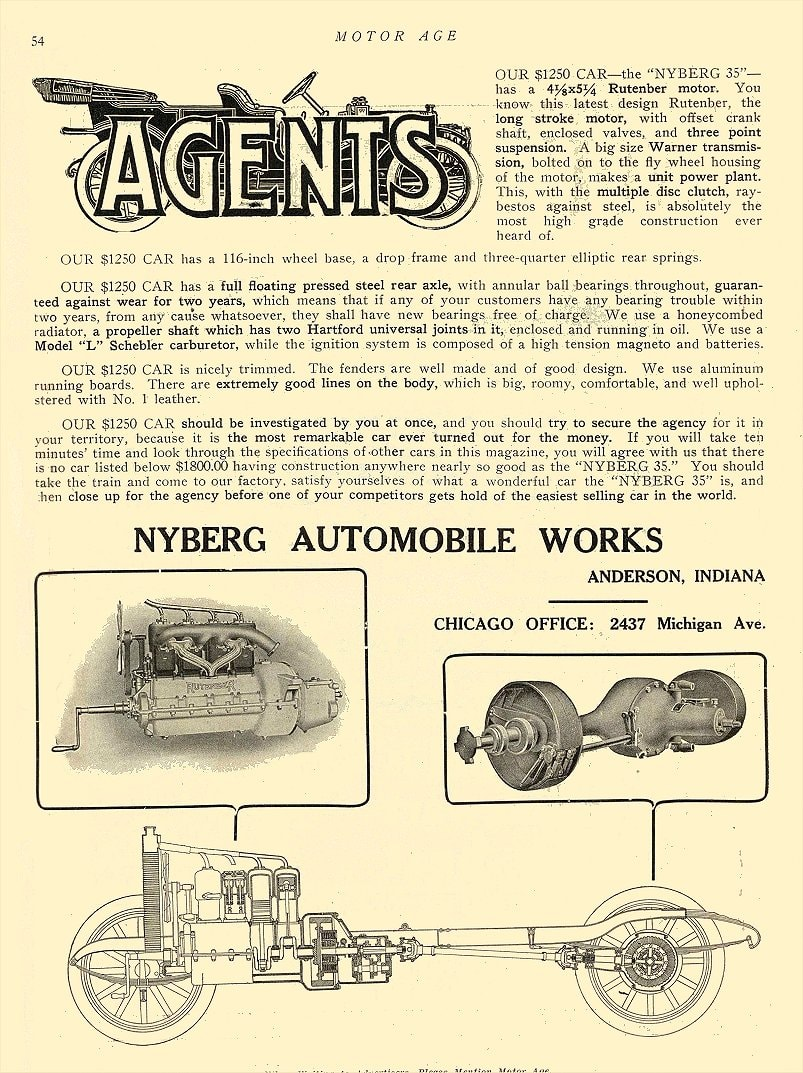
1911 advertisement for Nyberg in Motor Age Magazine

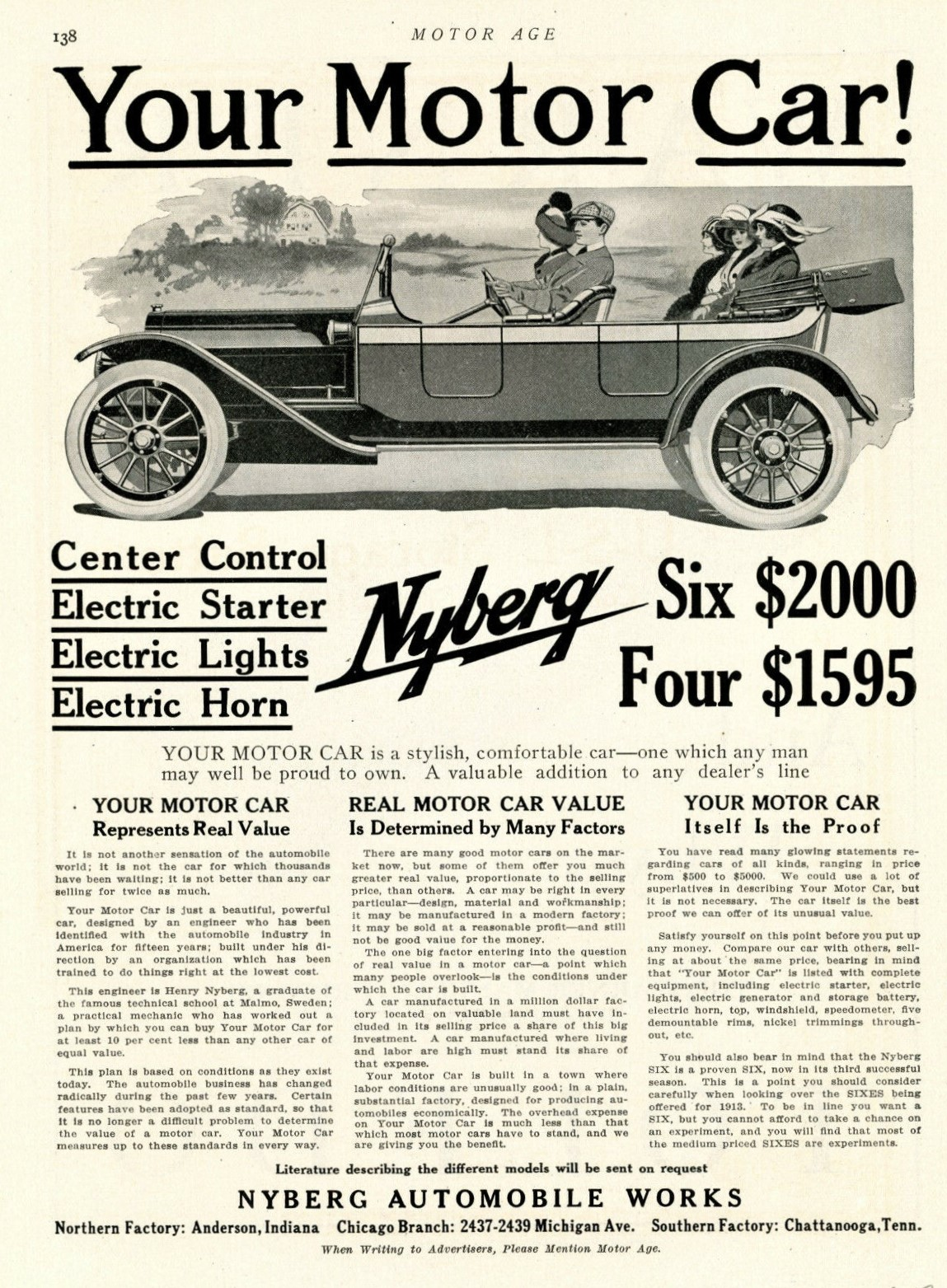
1912 Nyberg Six and Four advertisement in Motor Age

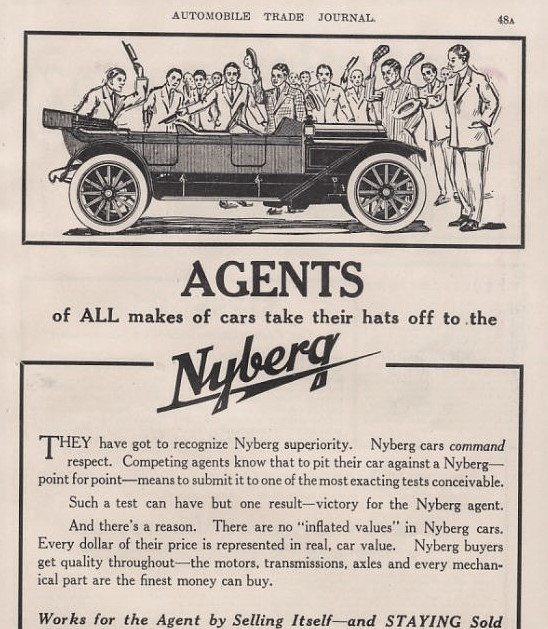
1913 Nyberg advertisement in the Automobile Trade Journal

Underfunded, in 1914 the Anderson and Chattanooga branches went into receivership. Operations ceased in 1914. The two branches were sold to A. C. Barley who was building the Halladay automobile in Streator, Illinois. Production did not resume under Barley and in February 1915 Henry Nyberg purchased the Anderson factory.

== Madison Motors Company ==
Madison Motor Company Madison Motors Corporation
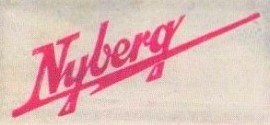
- Formerly: Nyberg Automobile Works
- Company type: Automobile manufacturer
- Industry: Automotive
- Founded: 1915; 111 years ago
- Founder: Henry Nyberg, Cecil Gibson
- Defunct: 1919; 107 years ago
- Fate: Acquired
- Successor: Bull Tractor Company
- Headquarters: Anderson, Indiana
- Products: Automobiles
- Production output: 457 (1915–1919)

In March 1915, Henry Nyberg allied himself with Cecil Gibson, who had been associated with the Empire automobile from Indianapolis. They purchased the former Nyberg factory in Anderson to build a new car. Their car, a light six-cylinder with Rutenber engine, would be sold in the $1,500 (equivalent to $44,381 in 2025) range. It would initially be called the Dolly (sic) Madison, but by 1916 the partners decided to shorten it to simply Madison.

The Madison Motor Company had been incorporated in 1915 with $500,000 capitalization. In October 1916 it was reorganized as the $2 million Madison Motors Corporation. The venture never received sufficient funding and in the early spring of 1919, Madison Motors was taken over by the Bull Tractor Company.

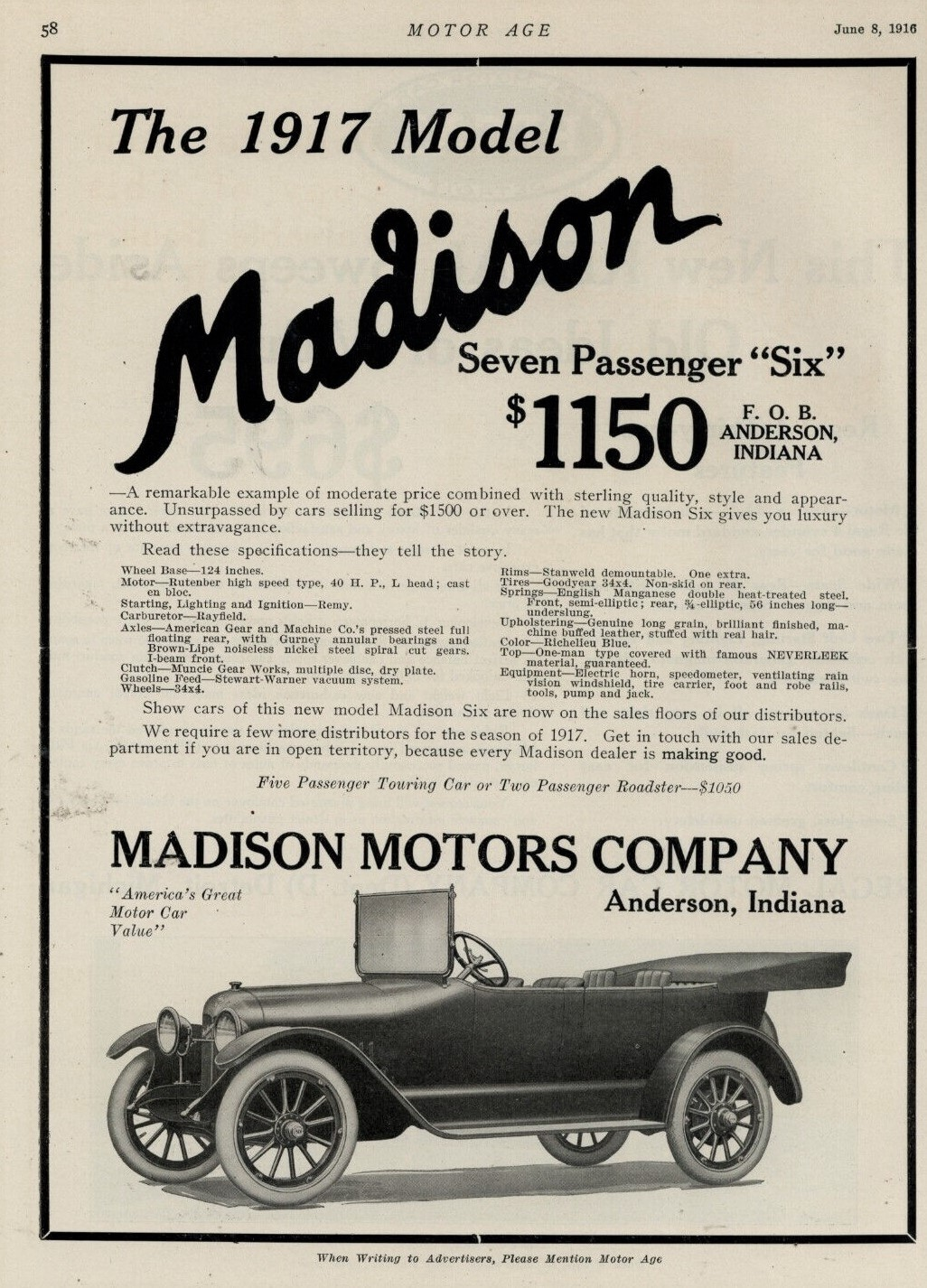
1916 advertisement for the 1917 Madison in Motor Age Magazine

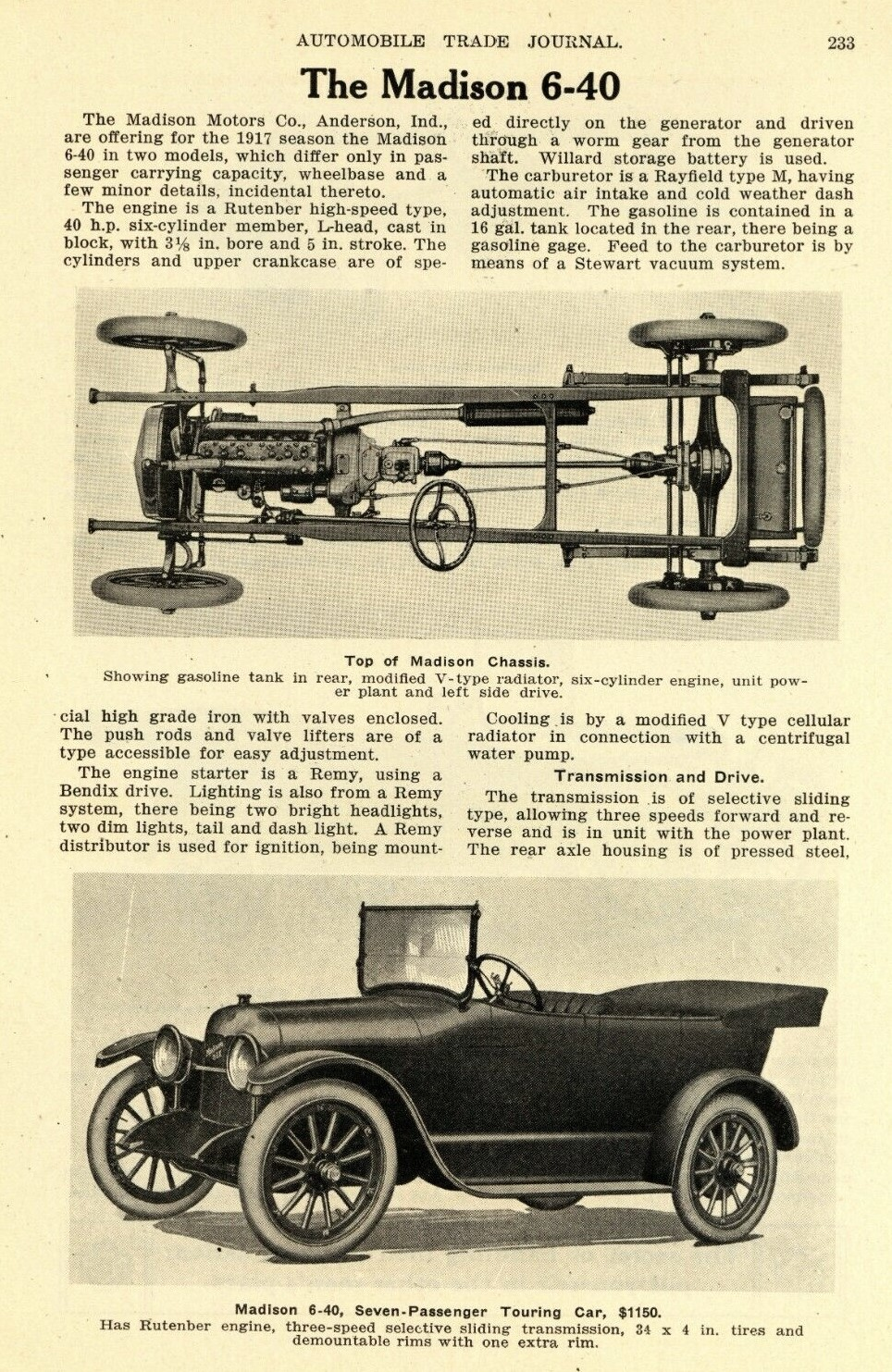
Article on the Madison Model 6-40 in the Automobile Trade Journal - Page 1

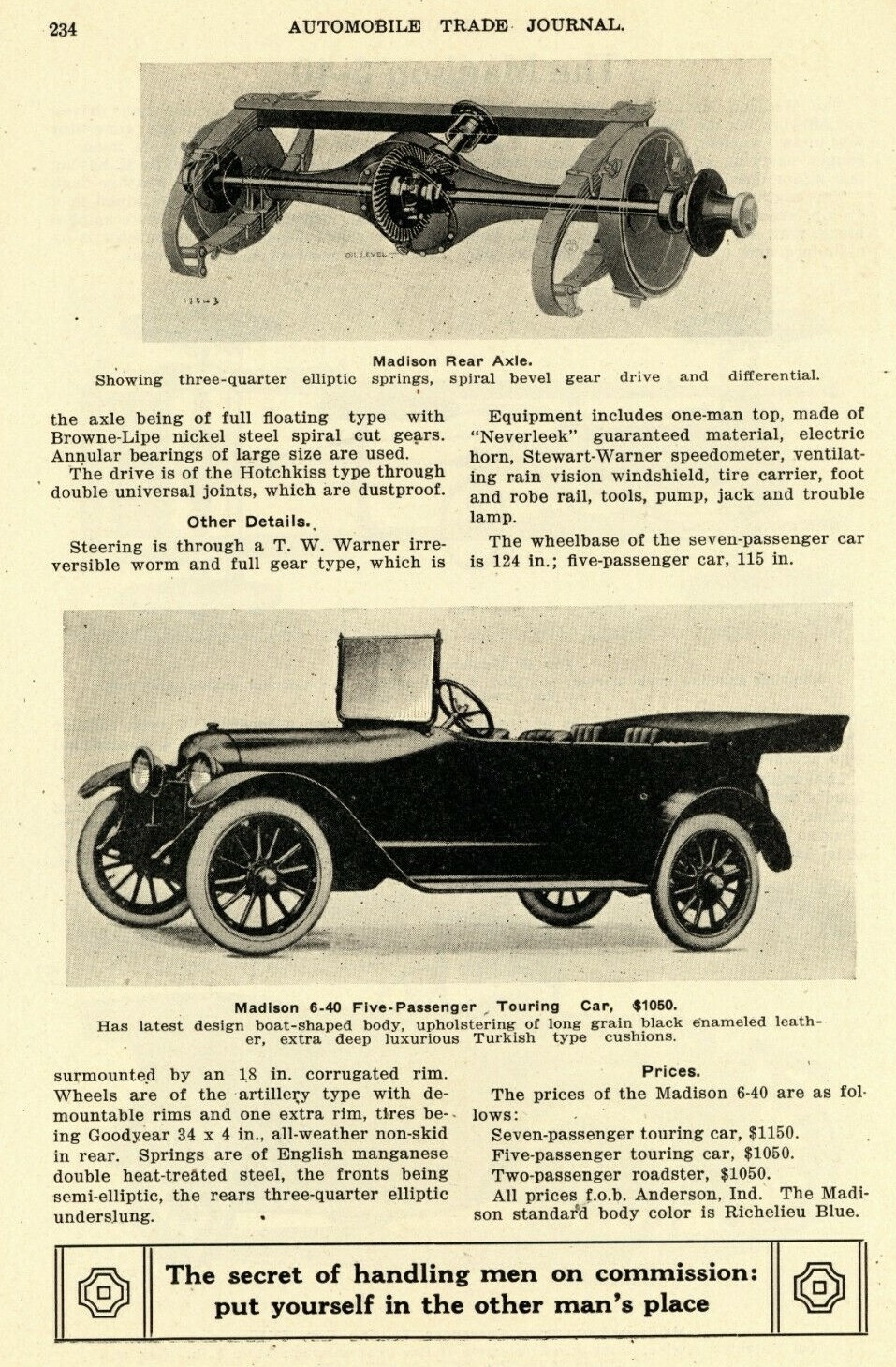
Article on the Madison Model 6-40 in the Automobile Trade Journal - Page 2

Henry Nyberg was also associated with the Regal automobile, establishing a plant in Berlin, Ontario, in 1915. Regal's were assembled there until supplies from the Detroit plant ceased in 1917.

== See also ==
- Rider-Lewis, Nyberg Factory - Historic Structures
- Rider-Lewis (automobile company)
- Historic American Engineering Record (HAER) No. IN-38, "Rider-Lewis Motor Car Company, West Second Street & Sycamore, Anderson, Madison County, IN", 13 photos
- Herald-Bulletin Article – 1 Factory 3 Cars by Beth Oljace, 2011
- Herald-Bulletin Article – Several Auto Factories by David Humphrey, 2013
- Dittlinger, Esther W.; Dittlinger, David; Dittlinger, Peggy (1990). Anderson: A Pictorial History. St. Louis: G. Bradley Publishing. p. 78. ISBN 9780943963167. OCLC 22865633.
- Chattanooga Times Free Press article -Chattanooga's first automobile manufacturer
- The Old Motor- Nyberg a very rare car
- The Coker Museum has two Nybergs
- Annie Mame – Ann Nyberg – The Nyberg Car
