= Regal (automobile) =

Defunct American motor vehicle manufacturer

Regal Motor Car Company
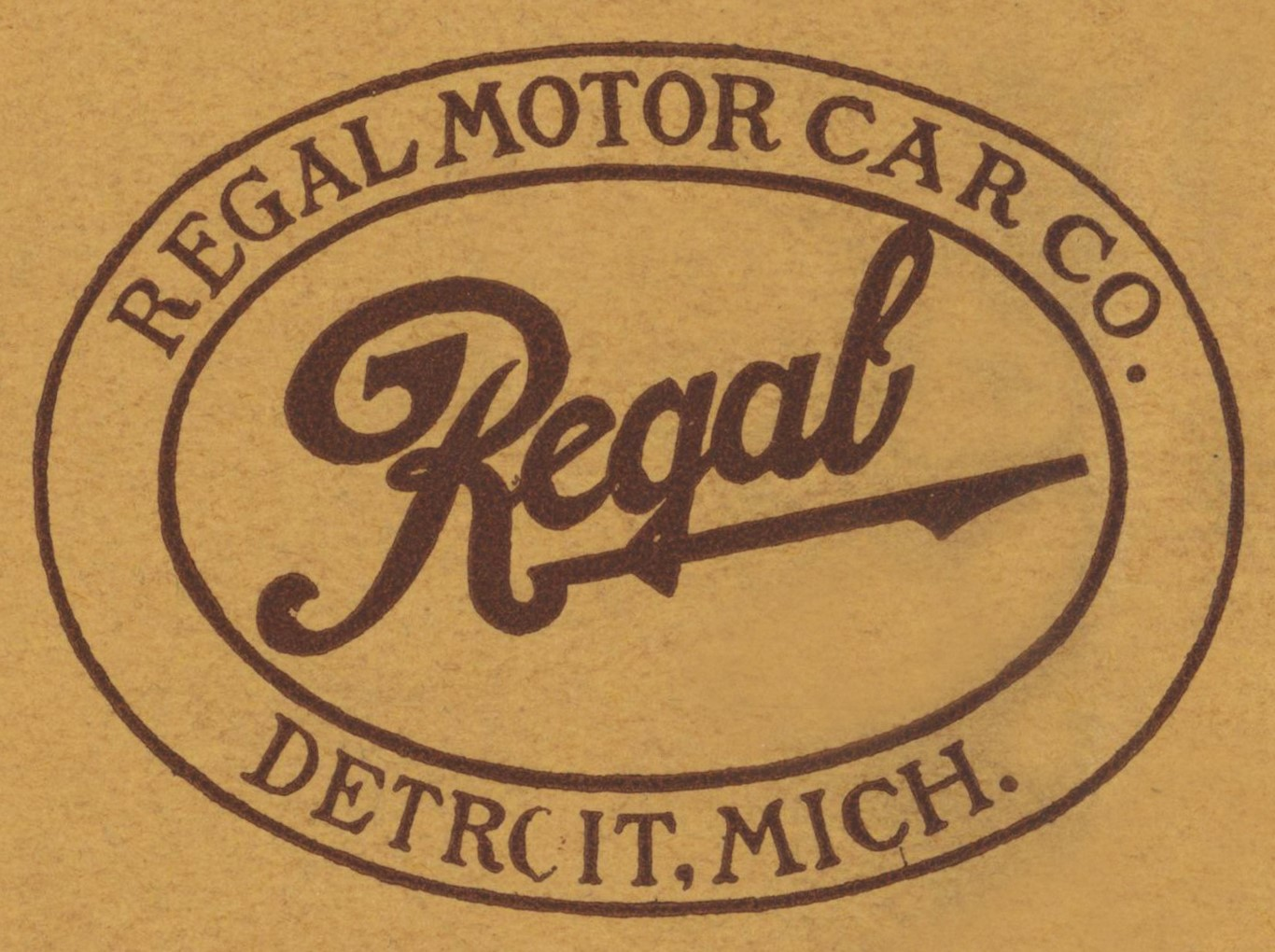
- Regal logo from 1913 brochure

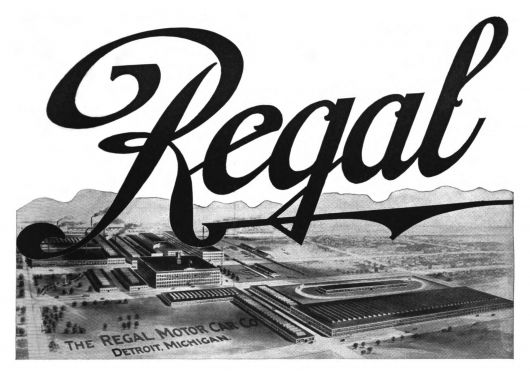
- Regal factory postcard 1912
- Industry: Automotive
- Founded: 1908; 118 years ago
- Founder: Lambert brothers, Fred W. Haines
- Defunct: 1918; 108 years ago
- Fate: Bankruptcy
- Headquarters: Detroit, Michigan, United States
- Key people: Charles R. Lambert, J. E. Lambert, Bert Lambert, Fred Haines, Paul Arthur
- Products: Automobiles
- Production output: 52,544 (1908-1918)

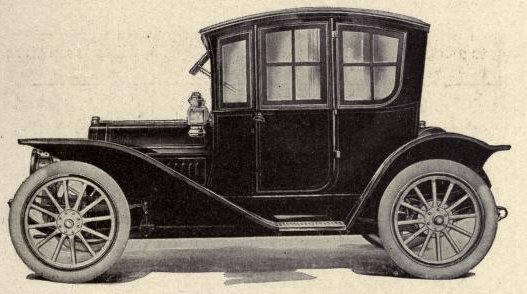
1912 Regal Underslung Coupé

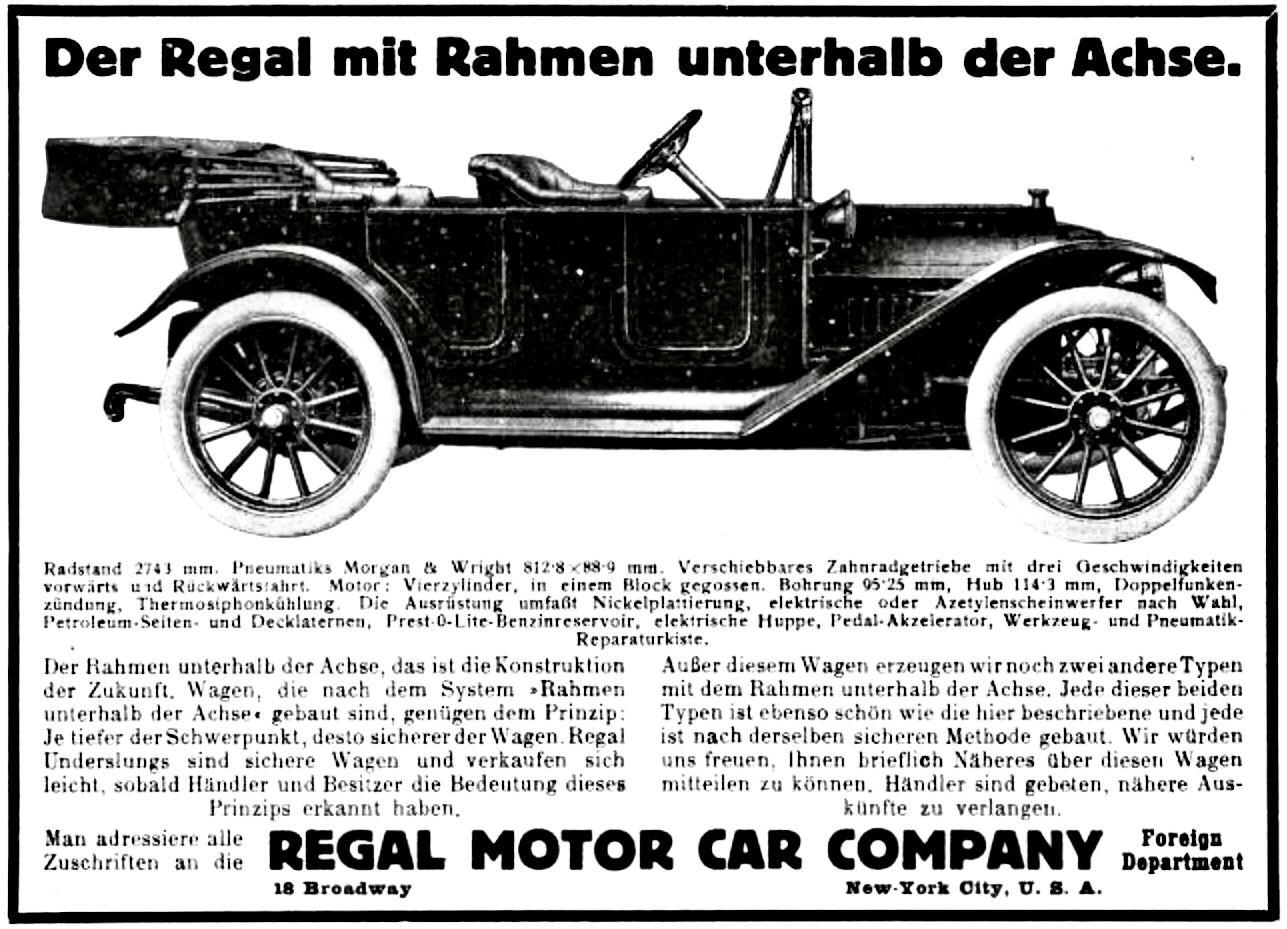
Regal Twenty-Five Model T (1914)

The Regal was an American automobile produced by the Regal Motor Car Company of Detroit, Michigan, from 1907 to 1918.

== History ==
The Regal Motor Car Company of Detroit, Michigan was established in 1908 as a partnership between brothers Charles R., J. E. and Bert Lambert and Fred W. Haines. The Regal was a medium-sized and medium-priced automobile designed by Paul Arthur. The car was widely publicized and a factory stock 30-hp Regal nicknamed "Plugger" crossed the country 5 times in 1909 and 1910 covering 22,000 miles. Regal four-cylinder engines were their own design while automobile bodies came from the Fisher coachworks of Detroit.

Regal introduced an Underslung chassis model late in 1910 which added to its sporting image. In 1915 a V-8 engine and a light four-cylinder engine designed by S. G. Jenks were introduced that were manufactured by the Port Huron Construction Company. Regal pricing was competitive, in 1911 pricing started at $900 (equivalent to $31,098 in 2025) for a Runabout to $1,650 (equivalent to $57,013 in 2025) for a Fore-Door Touring car. Regal was among the leaders in U.S. automobile exporting.

Material shortages due to the First World War slowed production and Regal Motor Car Company ran out of operating funds. In February 1918, creditors elected to liquidate the company. The factory was purchased and kept open for a short while making spare parts.

=== Regal Britain ===
In addition to American sales, from 1911 the cars were exported to Britain. The Seabrook Brothers who had a large automotive accessories business, branded the Regal as RMC and Seabrook-RMC for the British market. The First World War interrupted the supply from Regal and Seabrook turned to importing Napoleon trucks for the war effort.

=== Regal Canada ===
In 1910 an attempt was made to assemble the Regal across the river from Detroit in Walkersville, Ontario, Canada, but very few were made.

Henry Nyberg who had made cars under his own name, and was involved with the Madison automobile, set up Canadian Regal Motors, Ltd in Berlin (later Kitchener, Ontario) in 1914.

The factory was the first in Canada to have a proper test track and test hill. It also had a club building with reading rooms, pool and dining rooms for factory workers with a separate one for white collar staff.

A 30-hp four-cylinder Regal and the V8 Regal were produced. Local bodywork was used on the Regal components shipped from Detroit. Between 200 and 400 cars were sold up to the end of 1916 when supply problems arose with the Detroit factory. Due to World War I, Regal Motor Company in Detroit closed down.

Nyberg closed and sold the factory in 1918 and built another factory next door to build the Saxon automobile. When this didn't happen, he made the Dominion unit, which converted cars into light trucks.

== Advertisements ==
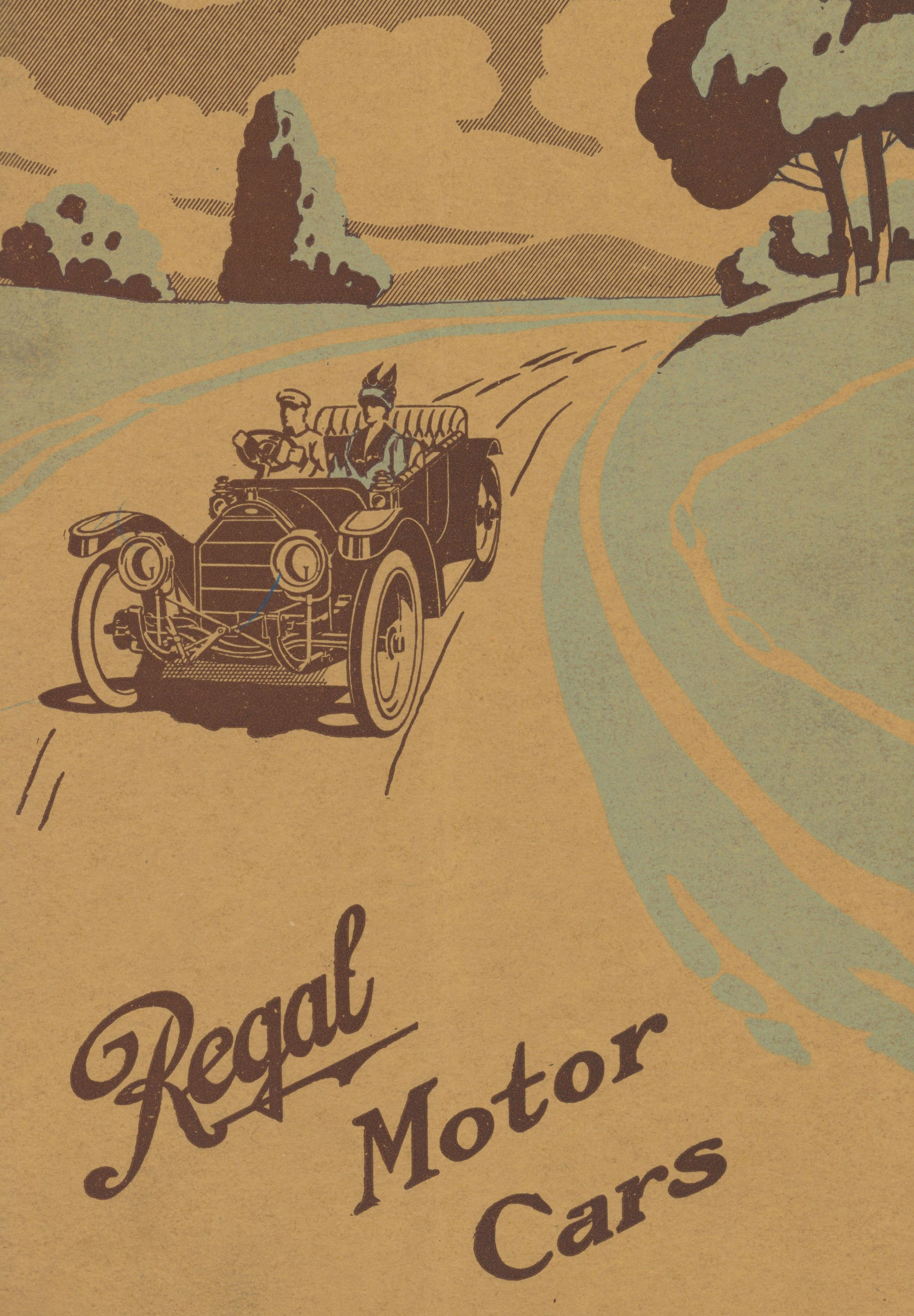
Regal Motor Cars brochure cover

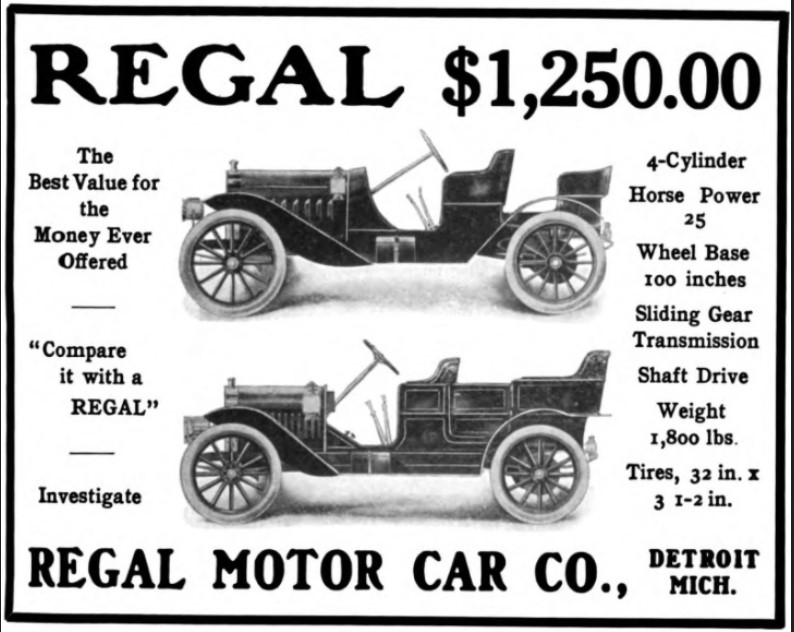
1908 Regal advertisement Cycle & Automobile Trade Journal

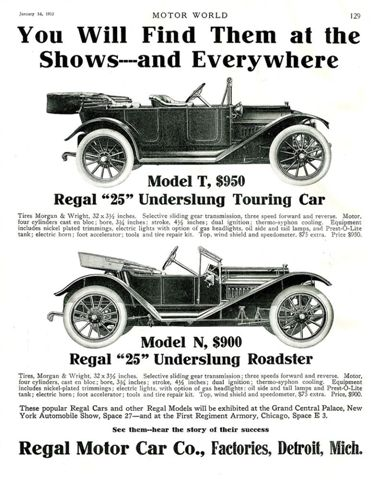
1910 Regal 25 advertisement in Motor World

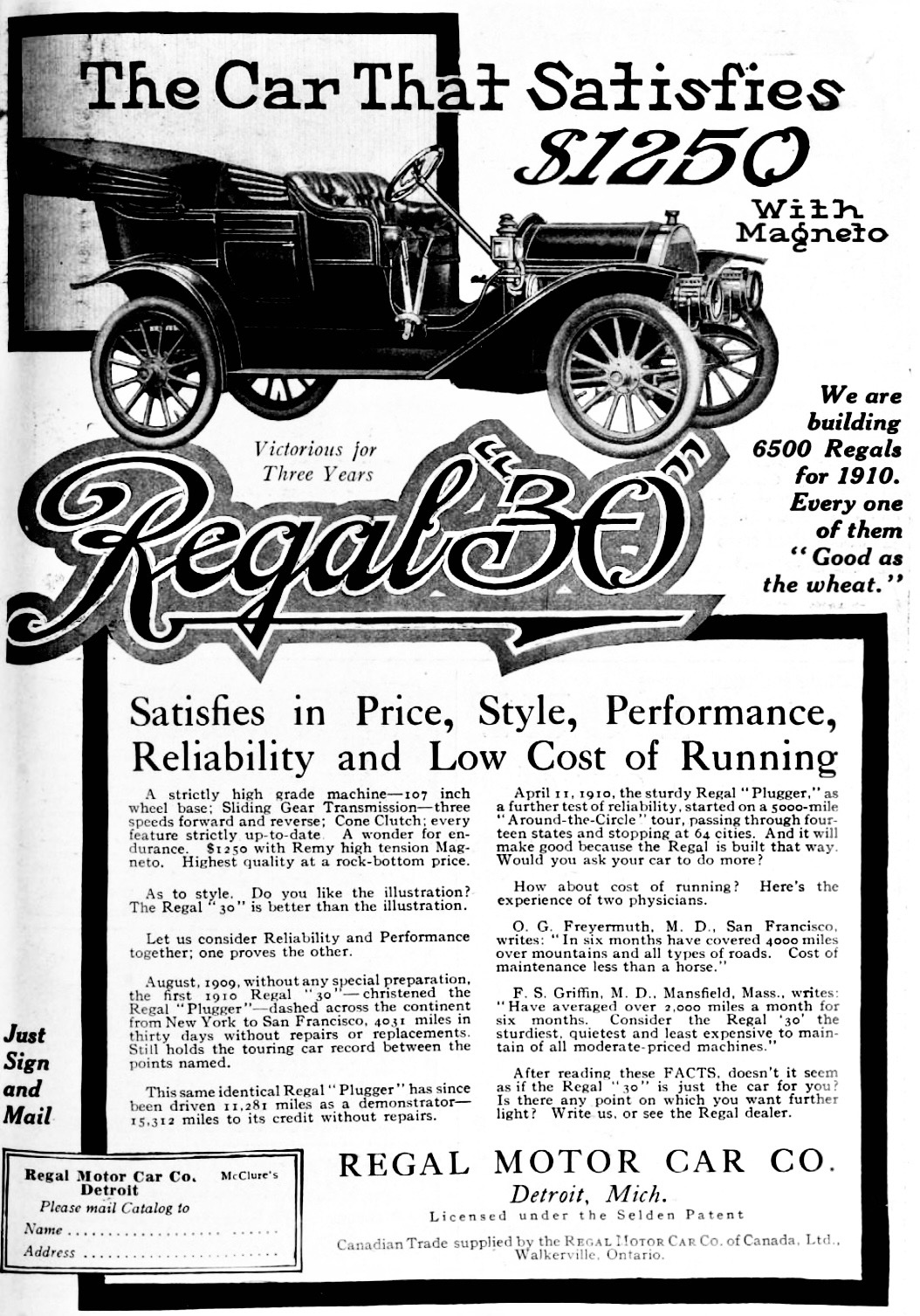
Regal 30 advertisement (1910)

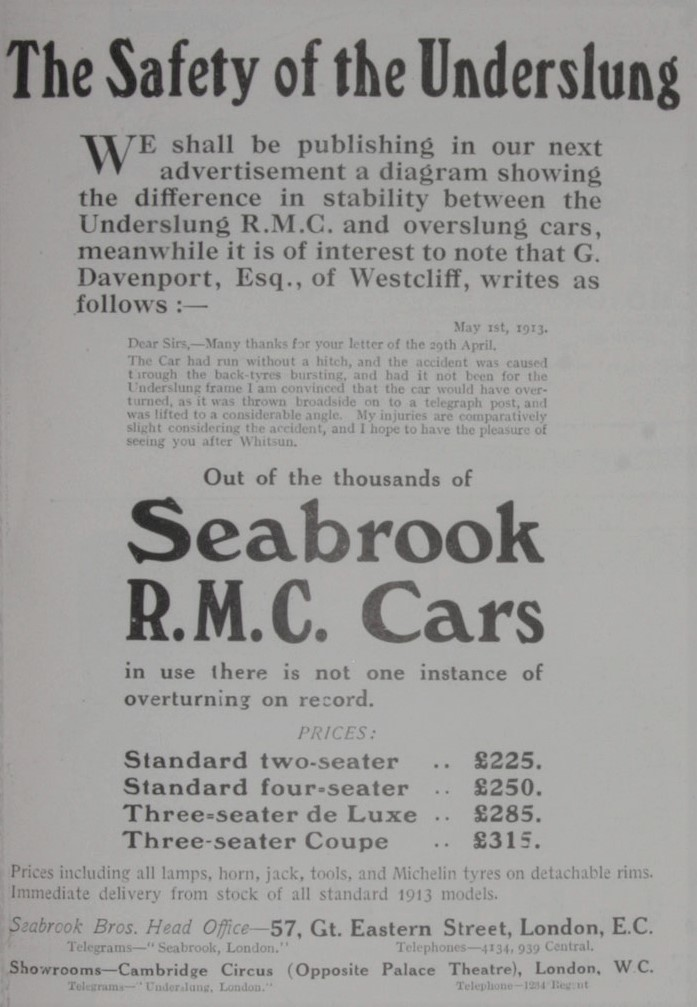
1913 Seabrook R.M.C. advertisement

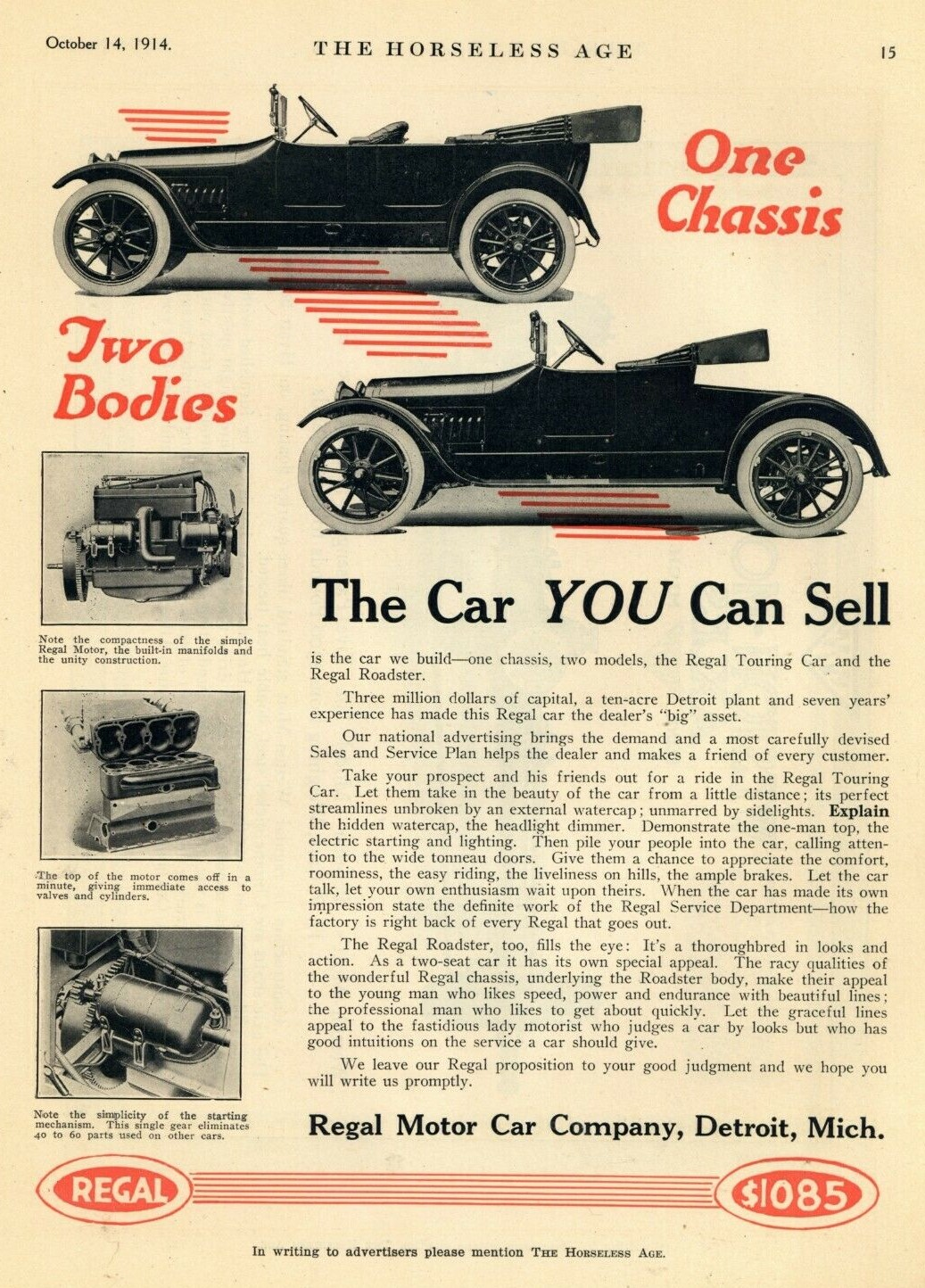
1914 Regal advertisement in The Horseless Age

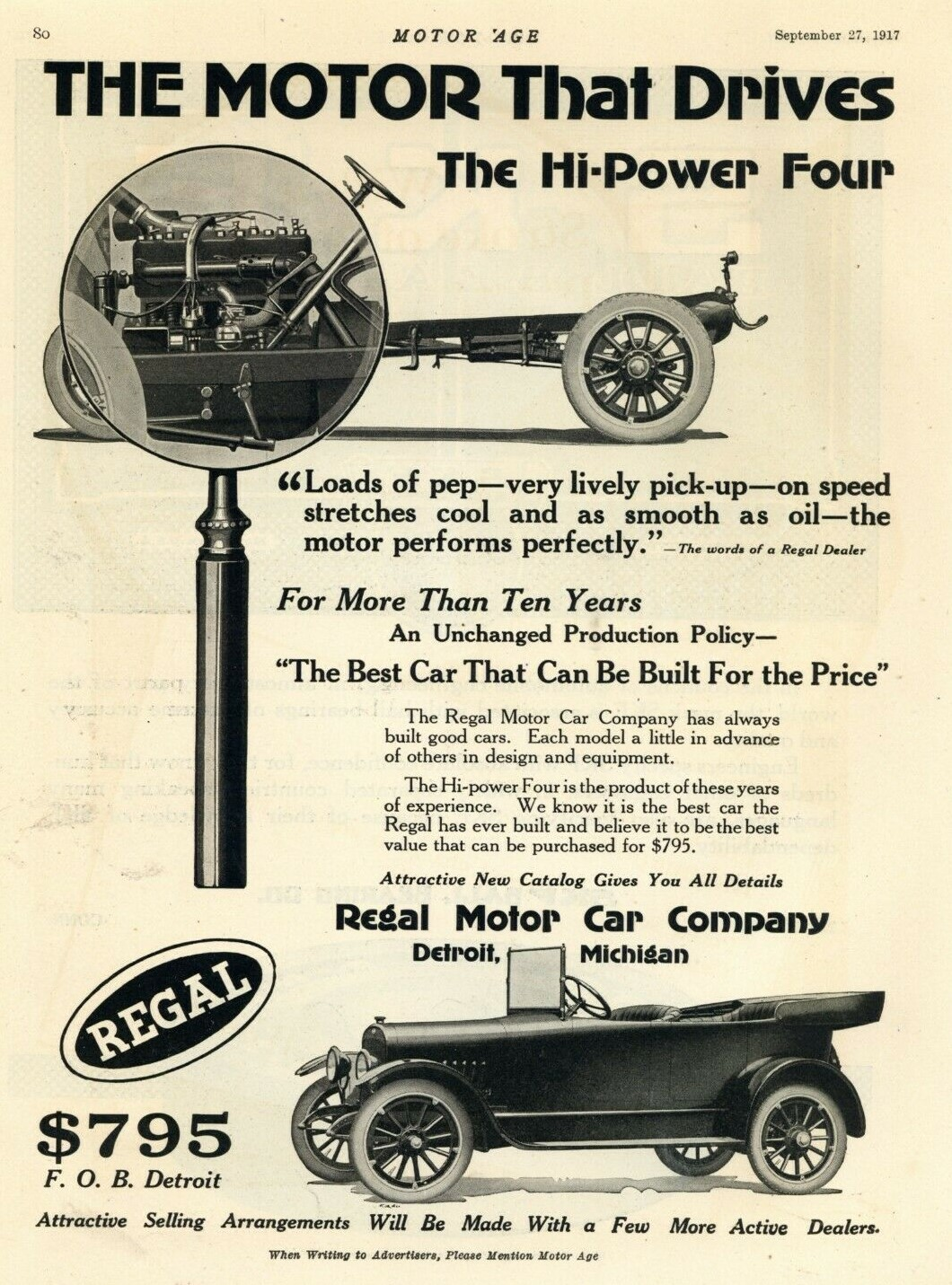
1917 Regal advertisement in Motor Age

== Models ==
Year	Model	Type	Cylinders	Horsepower	wheelbase (cm)	Body Style
1908	Twenty-Five		4	25	254	Touring Car, Runabout
1909	Thirty		4	30	267	Touring Car, Runabout, Baby Tonneau
1910	Thirty		4	30	272	Touring Car, Runabout, Coupé, Limousine
1910	Forty		4	40	312	Touring Car
1911	Twenty	Model N	4	20	254	Runabout
1911	Thirty	Model L	4	30	279	Touring Car
1911	Thirty	Model LF	4	30	279	Fore-Door Touring Car
1911	Forty	Model S	4	40	312	Touring Car
1911	Forty	Model SF	4	40	312	Fore-Door Touring Car
1912	Twenty-Five	Model N	4	25	254	Runabout
1912	Twenty-Five	Model NC	4	25	254	Colonial Coupé
1912	Thirty	Model L	4	30	279	Touring Car
1912	Thirty	Model LF	4	30	279	Fore-Door Touring Car
1912	Thirty	Model LO	4	30	279	Torpedo
1912	Thirty-Five	Model H	4	35	300	Touring Car
1912	Forty	Model S	4	40	312	Touring Car
1912	Forty	Model SF	4	40	312	Fore-Door Touring Car
1913	Twenty-Five	Model N	4	25	274	Roadster
1913	Twenty-Five	Model NC	4	25	274	Coupé
1913	Twenty-Five	Model T	4	25	274	Touring Car
1913	Thirty	Model C	4	30	295	Touring Car
1913	Thirty-Five	Model H	4	35	300	Touring Car
1914	Twenty-Five	Model N	4	25	274	Roadster
1914	Twenty-Five	Model NC	4	25	274	Coupé
1914	Twenty-Five	Model T	4	25	274	Touring Car
1914	Thirty-Five	Model C	4	35	295	Touring Car
1915	Light Four		4	20	269	Roadster, Touring Car
1915	Four	Model D	4	39	279	Touring Car
1915	Four	Model R	4	39	279	Roadster
1915	Eight		8	40	284	Roadster, Touring Car
1916	Model D		4	39	292	Roadster, Touring Car
1916	Model E		4	27	269	Touring Car, Roadster
1916	Model F		8	44	318	Touring Car, Roadster
1917	Model F		8	29	318	Touring Car, Roadster, Limousine
1917	Model J		4	20	274	Touring Car
1918	Model J	High Power Four	4	20	274	Touring Car

== Production ==
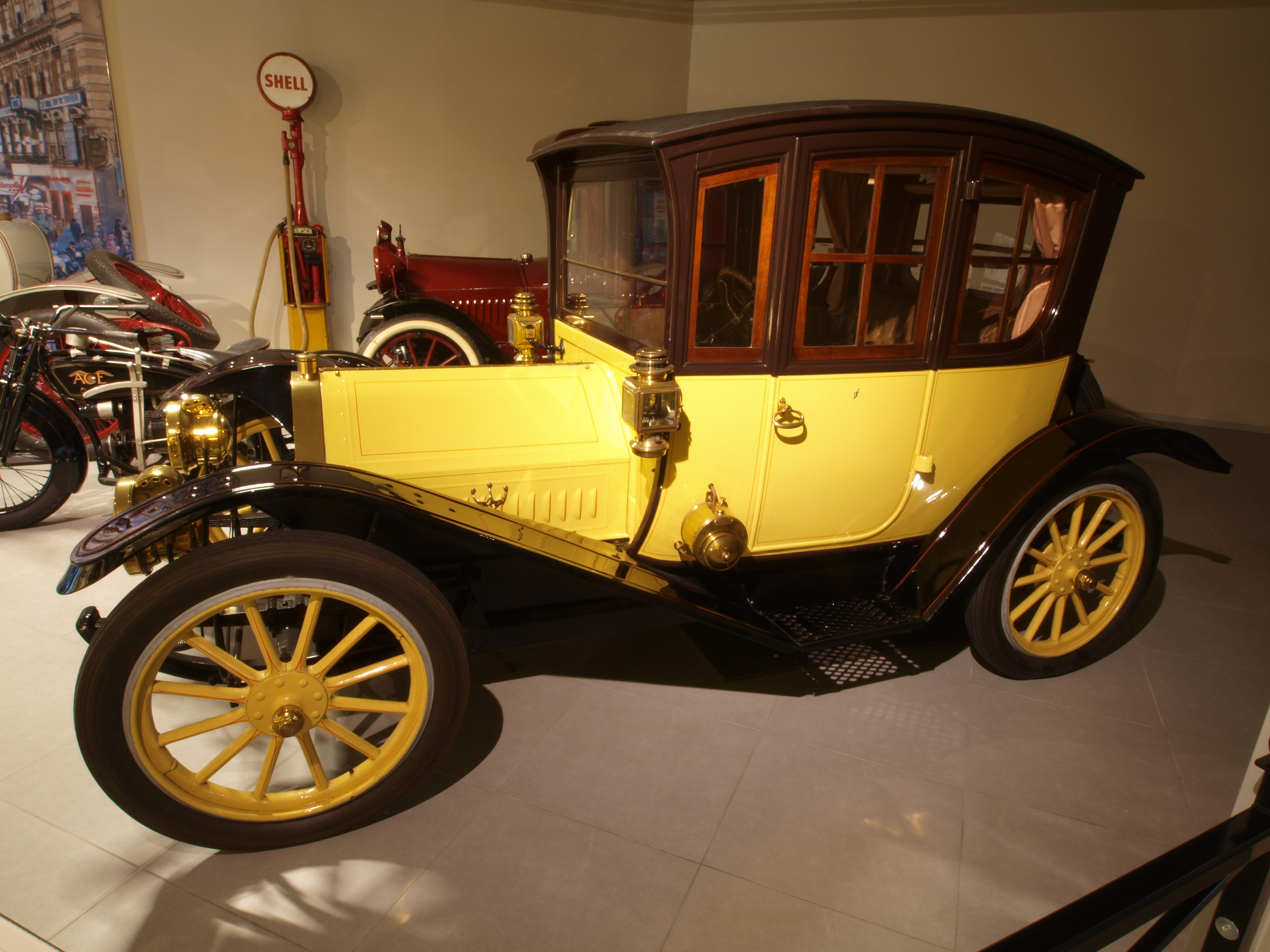
1912 Regal Underslung Model NC Colonial Coupe

Annual production totals

Year	Production
1908	425
1909	2,134
1910	3,587
1911	4,526
1912	5,822
1913	7,627
1914	8,136
1915	8,227
1916	7,114
1917	4,123
1918	823
Totals	52,544

== See also ==
- Regal automobiles at ConceptCarz
- Bonhams - 1911 Seabrook-RMC
- Detroit Public Library Collection - Regal Motor Car images
- Brass Era car
- List of defunct United States automobile manufacturers
