= Fisher Body F.C. =

Defunct Northern Irish football club

Fisher Body
- Full name: Fisher Body Football Club
- Nickname: Fisher's
- Founded: 1980
- Dissolved: 2004
- League: Northern Amateur Football League

Fisher Body Football Club, commonly known as Fisher Body or Fisher Body's, or simply Fisher's, was a Northern Irish football club based in Dundonald, County Down. Formed in the 1980 as a works team for the General Motors Fisher Body plant on the Upper Newtownards Road dual carriageway in the area of Carrowreagh. The club was formed by the Fisher Body workers and they joined the Northern Amateur Football League.

Fisher Body competed in multiple NAFL divisions, as well as the Irish Cup and the Steel & Sons Cup. The club declined in numbers following the closure of Fisher Body's plant. They also had a successful reserves team.

== Fisher Body plant ==
In 1979, Fisher Northern Ireland was established under the automotive company Fisher Body, a division of General Motors. They opened the plant in Carrowreagh, Dundonald, situated along the dual carriageway. The site was formerly a Rolls-Royce factory. Production would begin in 1980. In 1982, it was integrated into the Fisher Body Overseas Corporation. Following the sale of the Dundonald plant to the Takata Corporation in 1988, the firm began operating as European Components Corporation. It was then renamed renamed to TK-ECC.

The plant manufactured seat belts, door locks, door switches, window regulators and other automotive hardware.

The manufacturing plant officially closed its doors in 2004, and the site was later demolished.

In 2025, the former Fisher Body construction began for a £30 million residential housing development.

== History ==
In the early-mid 1980's forward Glenn Ferguson played for Fisher Body as a teenager. He caught the eye of scouts, and would sign for Ards F.C. in 1987. Ferguson would go on to play for Glenavon and Linfield, as well as earning five senior caps for the Northern Ireland national team.

In 1985 Fisher Body won the Division 2C league, finishing ahead of second-place Lisburn Rangers. Fisher Body completed the double as they won the Cochrane Corry Cup. They beat Peter Pan F.C. 2-1 in the final.

In the 1985-1986 season, Fisher Body pipped Kelvin Old Boys to become Division 2B champions and being back-to-back 1st place promotions.

Fisher Body finished the 1989-90 season as league champions, topping the league ahead of Malachians to the Division 1C title.

In the 1990–91 Irish Cup, Fisher Body reached the first round proper, but were beat 3-0 against Standard Telephones & Cables F.C. at home.

The 1991–92 Irish Cup seen Fisher Body beat General Electric Company F.C. 4-3 in the first round. In round 2, they were beat 5-1 against Killyleagh United.

== Honours ==
Northern Amateur Football League

- Division 1C
  - 1989-90
- Division 2B
  - 1985-86
- Division 2C
  - 1984-85
- 3rd Division B
  - 1989-90 - won by reserves
- 3rd Division C
  - 1985-86, 1987-88 - won by reserves
- Cochrane Corry Cup
  - 1984-85
- Walter Moore Cup
  - Runners-up: 1986-87 - reserves
