= Church-Field =

Defunct American motor vehicle manufacturer

The Church-Field was an early American electric car manufactured in Sibley, Michigan, by the Church-Field Motor Company from 1912–1913. The Church-Field had an underslung chassis, and used a two-speed transmission. With a choice of ten electrical selector positions, it gave the vehicle a total choice of twenty speed ranges. Two body styles were offered - a roadster sold for $2300 and a coupe for $2800.

The car was launched at the Detroit Automobile Show in January 1912, but production and sales were minimal, with the factory closing in September 1913. The assets of the company were sold in 1915 for $600.
