= Cadillac V-16 =

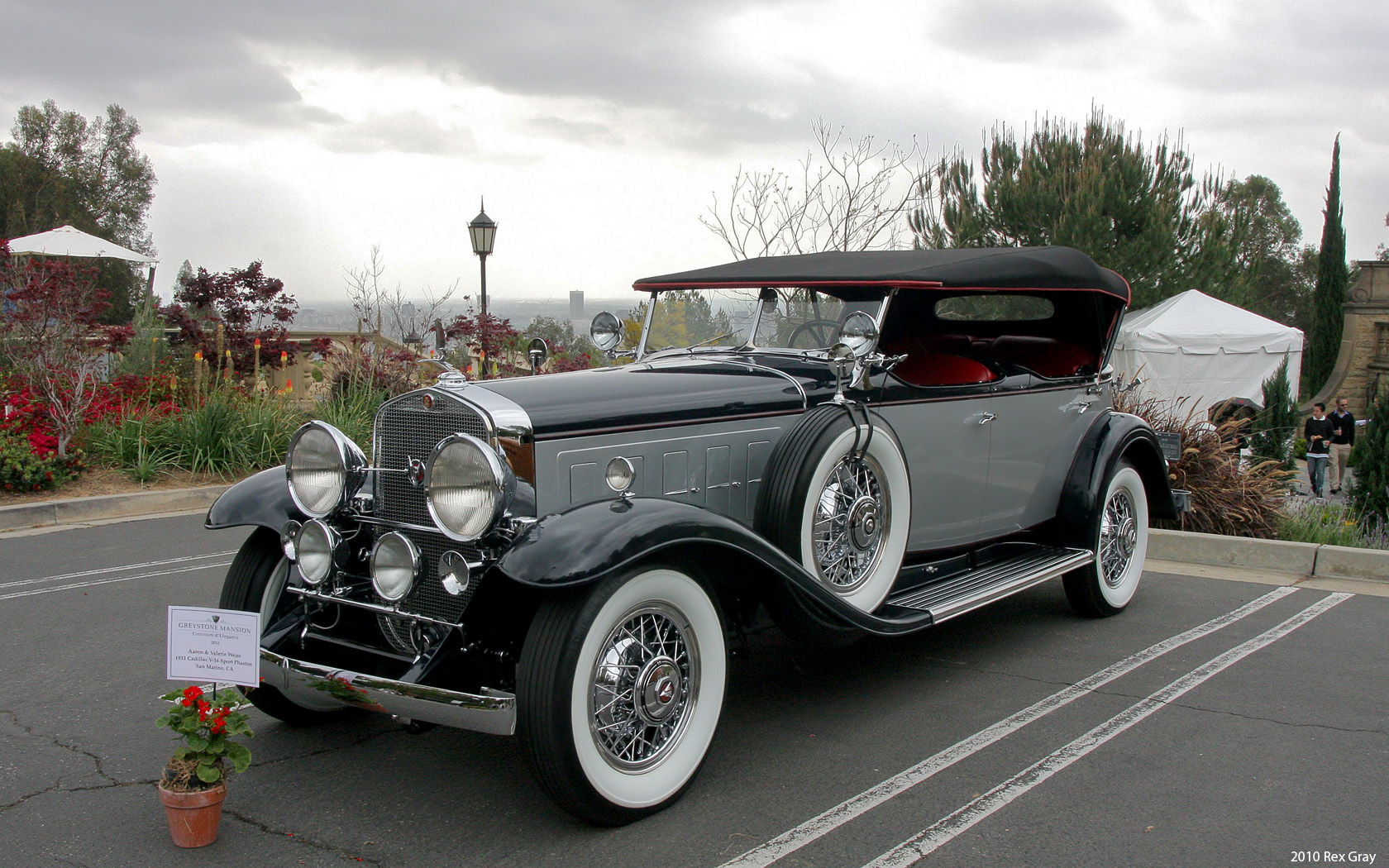
- 1931 Cadillac V-16 Sport Phaeton convertible

Overview
- Manufacturer: Cadillac (General Motors)
- Production: 1930–1940
- Assembly: United States: Detroit, Michigan (Detroit Assembly)
- Designer: Harley Earl

Body and chassis
- Class: Ultra-luxury car
- Body style: 2-door convertible 4-door convertible 2-door coupe 4-door sedan 4-door town car 4-door limousine
- Layout: FR layout
- Platform: D body

Powertrain
- Engine: Cadillac V16 engine
- Transmission: 3-speed synchromesh manual

The Cadillac V-16 (also known as the Cadillac Sixteen) was Cadillac's top-of-the-line model from its January 1930 launch until 1940. The V16 powered car was a first in the United States, both extremely expensive and exclusive, with every chassis being custom-finished to order. Only 4,076 were constructed in its 11-year run, with the majority built in its debut year before the Great Depression took strong hold. The onset of World War II reduced the sales, resulting in its demise.

== Genesis ==
In 1926, Cadillac began the development of a new, "multi-cylinder" car. A customer requirement was seen for a car powered by an engine simultaneously more powerful and smoother than any other available. Development proceeded in great secrecy over the next few years; a number of prototype cars were built and tested as the new engine was developed, while at the same time Cadillac chief Larry Fisher and GM's stylist Harley Earl toured Europe in search of inspiration from Europe's finest coachbuilders. Unlike many builders of luxury cars, who sold bare chassis to be clothed by outside coachbuilding firms, General Motors had purchased the coachbuilders Fleetwood Metal Body and Fisher Body to keep all the business in-house. Cadillac rolling stock chassis could be purchased if a buyer insisted, but the intention was that few would need to do so. One Cadillac dealer in England, namely Lendrum & Hartman, ordered at least two such chassis in even rarer right hand drive (RHD) configuration and had Vanden Plas (Belgium) build first an elegant limousine-landaulet (engine #702297), then a sports sedan with unusual cycle fenders and retractable step plates in lieu of running boards (engine #702298, which was successfully shown in various Concours d'Elegance events in Europe before being bought by the young Nawab of Bahawalpur); both these cars have survived. A third RHD chassis was ordered by the Indian Maharaja of Orchha (Bhopal) and sent to Farina in Italy, in July 1931, for a boat tail body (engine between #703136 and #703152).

It was not until after the Wall Street crash of 1929 and the Great Depression that Cadillac announced to the world the availability of the costliest Cadillac yet, the new V-16 Series 452. The new vehicle was first displayed at New York City's automobile show on January 4, 1930. Despite the bad timing and high retail price, and although sales would later drop off considerably, the launch "exceeded Cadillac’s fondest aspirations."

== 1930–1937 ==
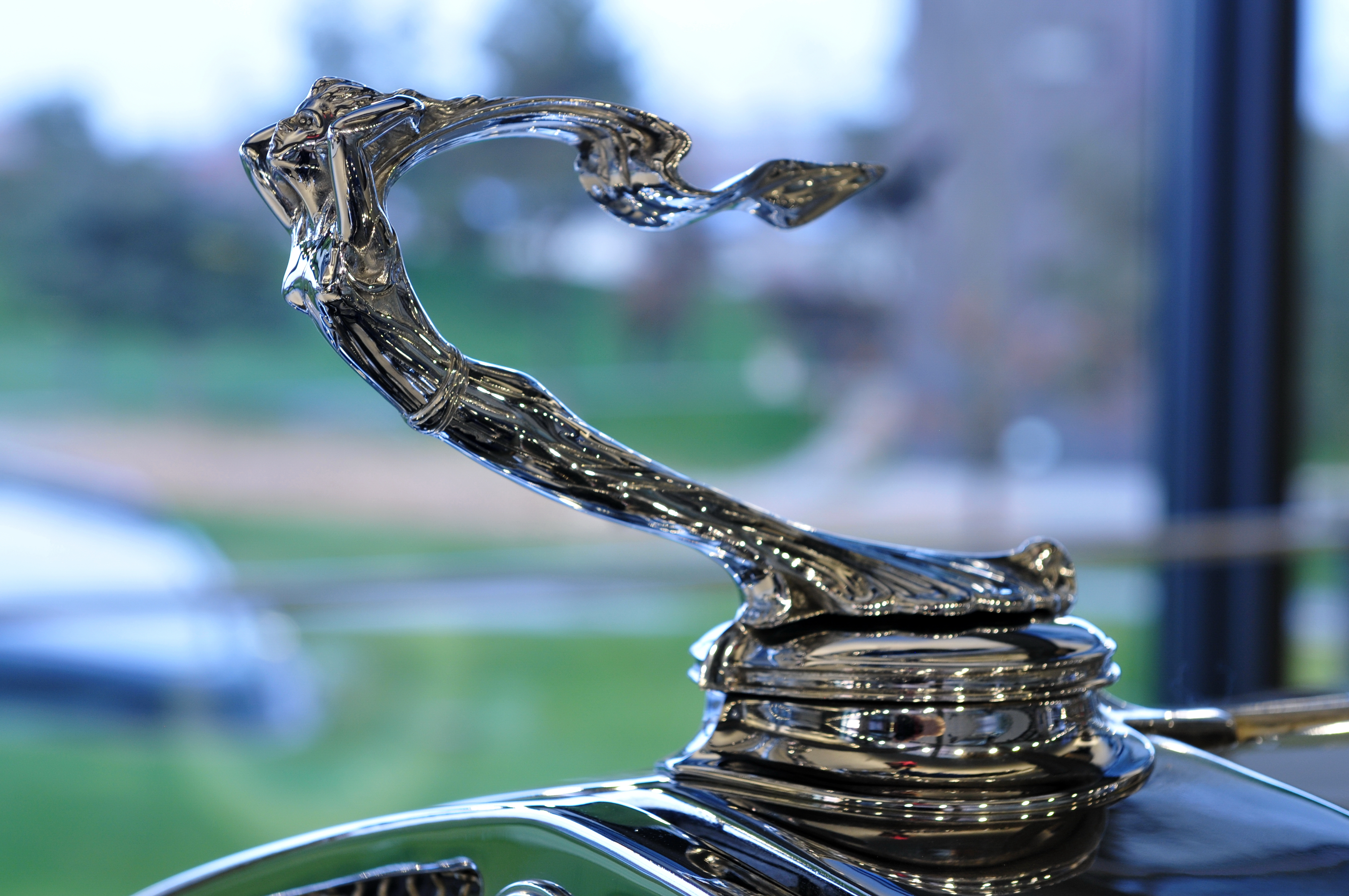
Cadillac "Goddess" hood ornament

Generation 1 (Series 452)
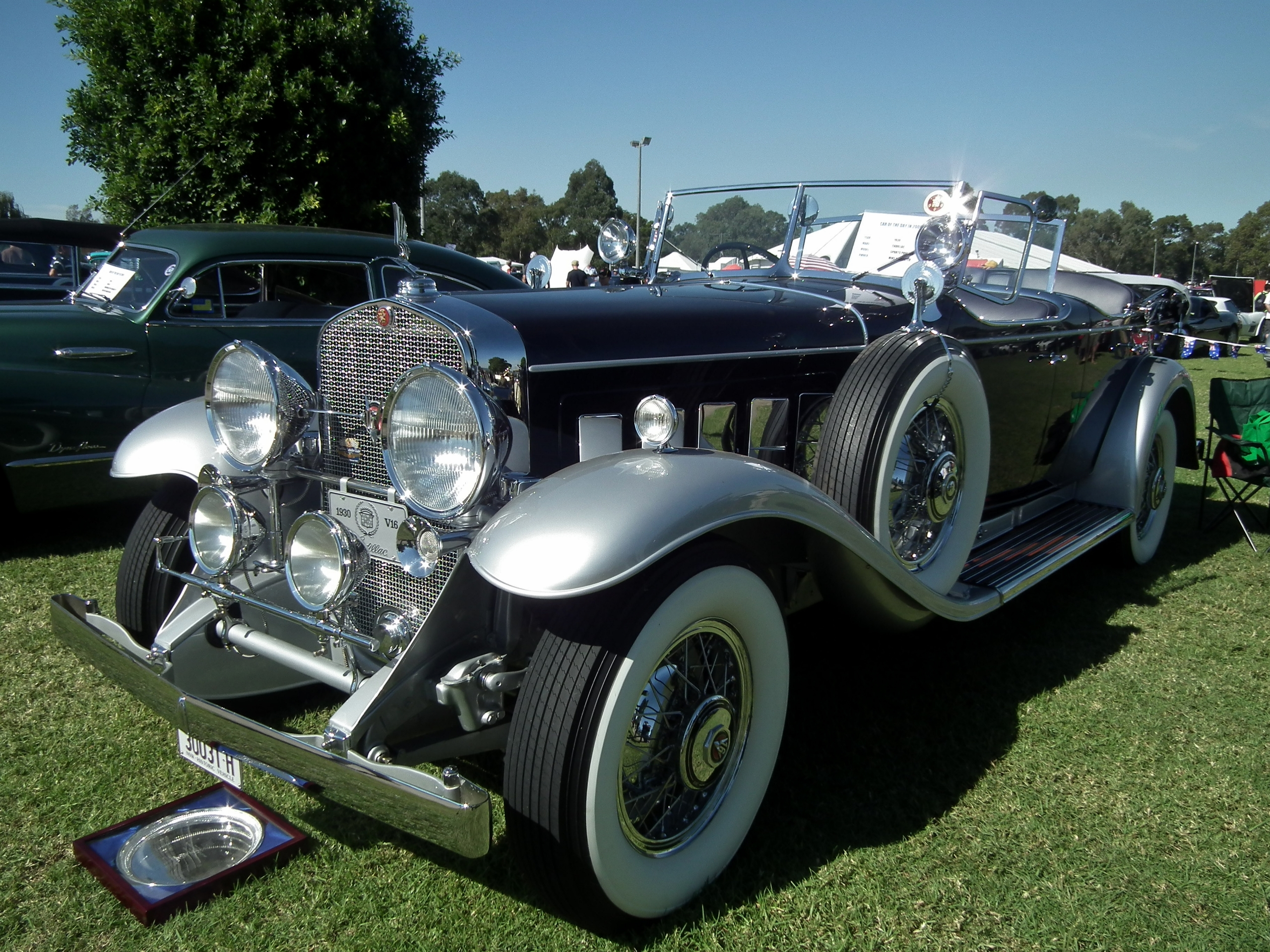
- 1930 Cadillac V-16 Dual Cowl Sports Phaeton

Overview
- Model years: 1930–1937

Body and chassis
- Platform: Series 90: D-body
- Related: Cadillac Series 370/85; Cadillac Series 355; Cadillac Series 75

Powertrain
- Engine: 452 cu in (7.4 L) Cadillac V16

Dimensions
- Wheelbase: 1930–31: 148.0 in (3,759 mm); 1932–33: 143.0 in (3,632 mm) and 149.0 in (3,785 mm); 1934–37: 154.0 in (3,912 mm)
- Length: 1930–31: 222.5 in (5,652 mm); 1932–33: 216.0 in (5,486 mm) and 222.0 in (5,639 mm); 1934–35: 240.0 in (6,096 mm); 1936–37: 238.0 in (6,045 mm)
- Width: 1931: 73.6 in (1,869 mm); 1932–35: 77.0 in (1,956 mm); 1936–37: 74.4 in (1,890 mm)
- Height: 1931: 72.5 in (1,842 mm); 1932–33: 71.5 in (1,816 mm); 1934–37: 69.5 in (1,765 mm)
- Curb weight: 5,300–6,600 lb (2,400–3,000 kg)

The Cadillac V-16 was distinguished by its pioneering V-16 engine, a narrow 45° V angle OHV Series 452 displacing 452 cu in (7.4 L).

Upon its introduction the new car attracted rave reviews from the press and huge public attention. January production averaged a couple of cars per day, then ramped up to twenty-two. By April, 1,000 units had been built, and by June, 2,000 cars. These could be ordered with a wide variety of bodywork. The Fleetwood catalog for the 1930 V-16 included 10 basic body styles; there was also an envelope containing some 30 additional designer's drawings. Research by the Cadillac-La Salle Club, Inc. puts at 70 the number of different job/style numbers built by Fisher and Fleetwood on the Sixteen chassis.

Beginning in June 1930, five new V-16s participated in a promotional tour of major European cities including Paris, Antwerp, Brussels, Amsterdam, Utrecht, Copenhagen, Stockholm, Berlin, Cologne, Dresden, Frankfurt, Hamburg, Munich, Nuremberg, Vienna (where they won prizes), Berne, Geneva, Lausanne, Zürich, Madrid, San Sebastian, La Baule and Angers. On the return journey from Spain, the V16 caravan stopped also in the town of Cadillac, in south-western France, although that city bears no relationship to the marque, other than its name.

After the peak in V-16 orders in mid-1930, production fell precipitously. During October 1930, only 54 cars were built. The lowest figures for the 452/452A cars of 1930–31 were August 1931 (seven units) and November 1931 (six units). Minimum production continued throughout the rest of the decade with a mere 50 units being built both in 1935 and in 1937. 1940 was only marginally better with a total of 51 units. Not surprisingly, Cadillac later estimated that they lost money on every single V-16 they sold. The 1930 Town Brougham was listed at US$9,200 ($177,311 in 2025 dollars).

Production of the original V-16 continued under various model names through 1937. The body was redesigned in 1933 as the model 452C. Innovations included Fisher no draft individually controlled ventilation (I.C.V. or vent windows).

For 1934, the body was redesigned again and denoted as 452D, and as 452E in 1935. The V-16 now featured the Fisher Turret Top all-steel roof, though the cars were still built by Fleetwood. This same basic design would remain virtually unchanged through 1937. With a wheelbase of 154.0 inches (3,912 mm) and a curb weight of up to 6,600 pounds (3,000 kg) these are perhaps the largest standard production cars ever produced in the United States. Combined production for the 1934 and 1935 model years was 150. It was redesignated the Series 90 in 1936 as Cadillac reorganized their model names. Fifty-two units were sold that year, with nearly half ordered as limousines. Hydraulic brakes were added for 1937, the last year of production, in which fifty vehicles were produced.

=== 1937 Cadillac V16 Hartmann Cabriolet ===
In 1937 Cadillac built fifty of their most expensive Series 90 V-16 chassis, and all but two were bodied in-house by Fleetwood. This chassis was delivered to Lausanne, Switzerland, to be bodied by Carrosserie Willy Hartmann per an order by local resident Philippe Barraud, a wealthy paper mill heir and playboy of the 1930s. Barraud wanted an outrageous, bespoke automobile to suit his stylish lifestyle. Stretching 22 feet in length, the car was designed in the sweeping cabriolet style of the Delahaye built by Figoni & Falaschi for the 1936 Paris Auto Salon.

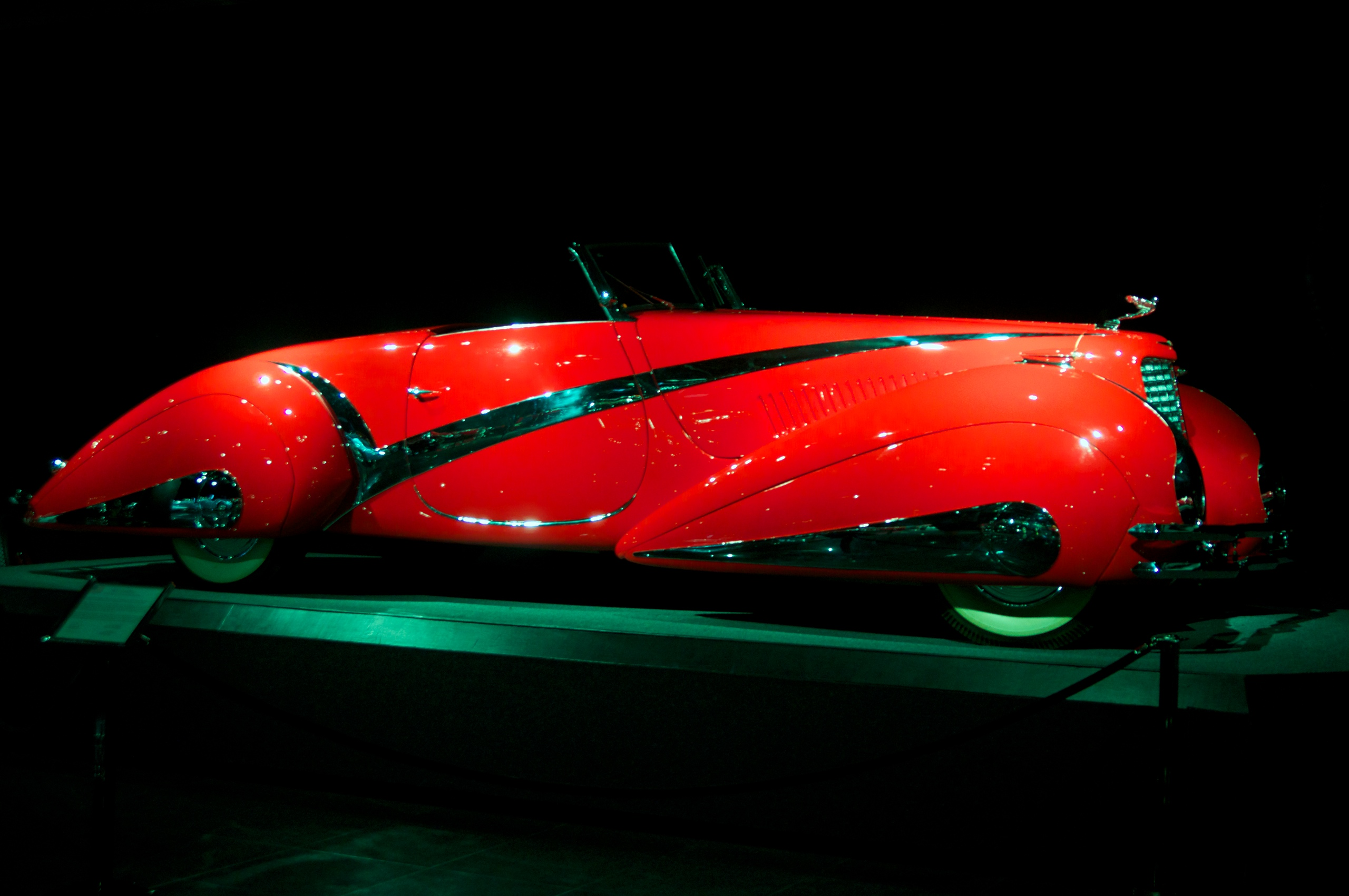

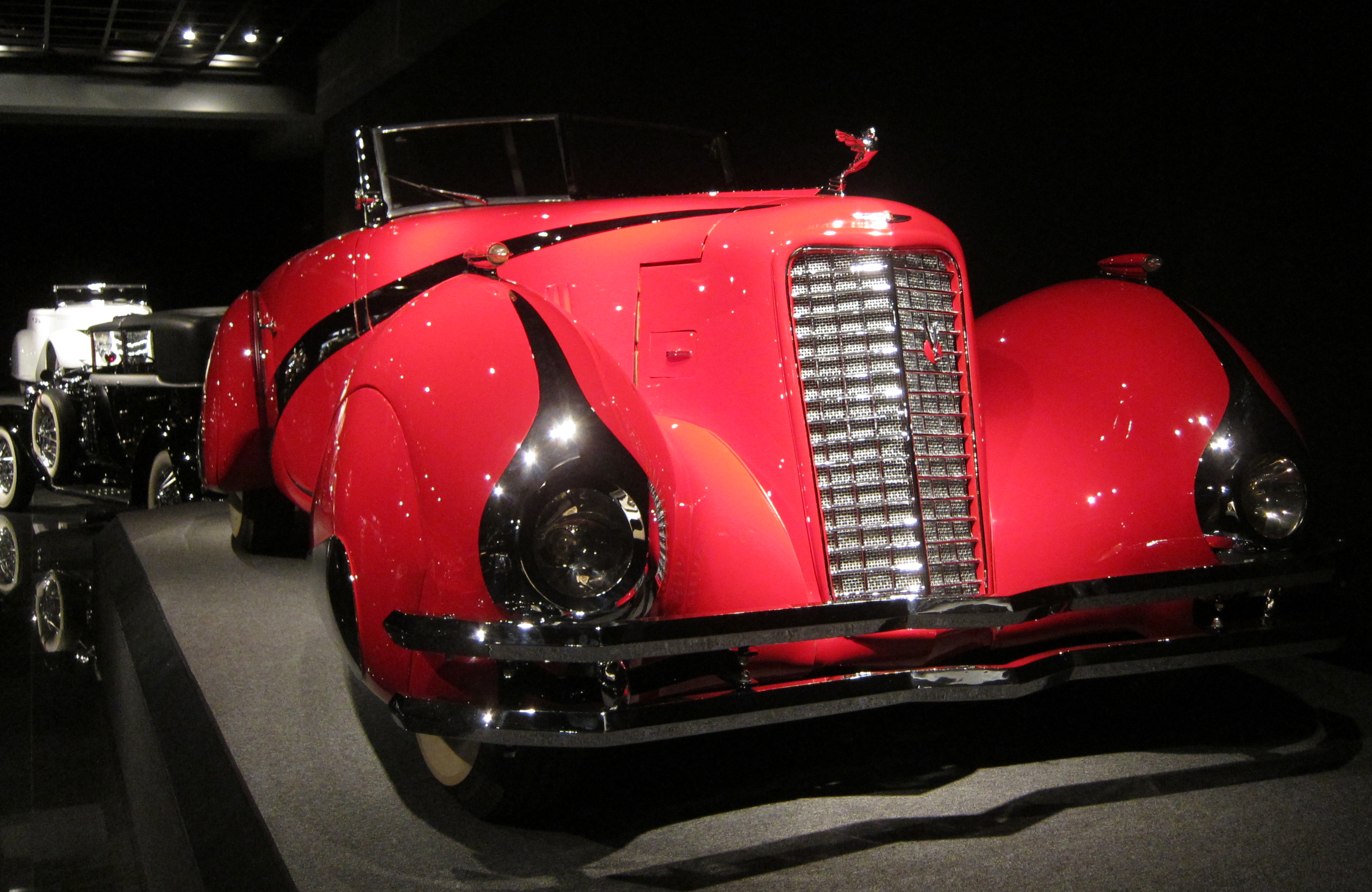

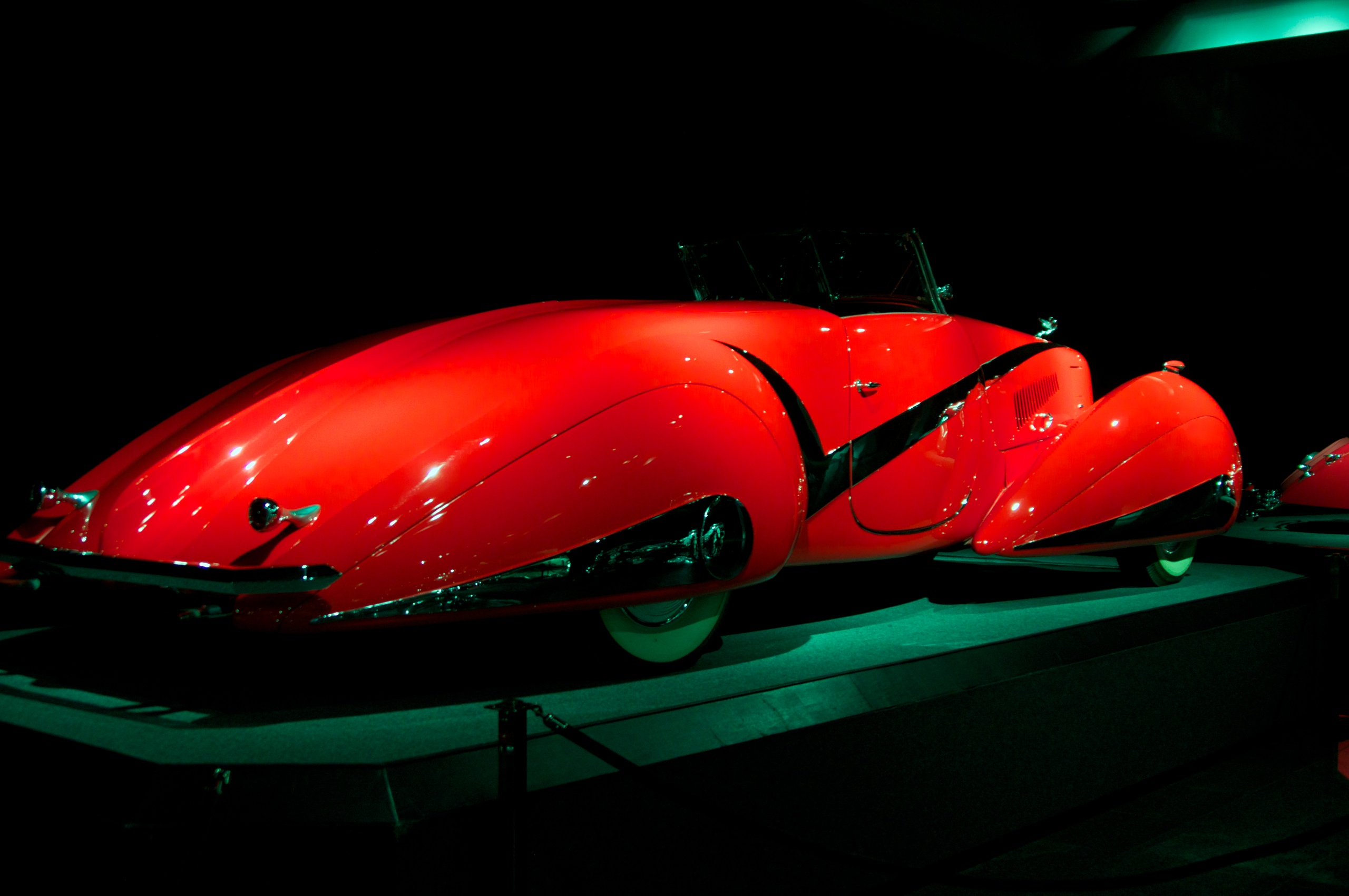

=== Production / Sales ===
Cadillac V-16 production and sales by model year (1930–1940)
Model year	Series	Engine	Factory production	Notes / calendar sales
1930	Series 452	452 cu in (7.41 L) 45° OHV V16	2,887	Over 2,500 sold in 1930
1931	Series 452A	452 cu in (7.41 L) 45° OHV V16	364	
1932	Series 452B	452 cu in (7.41 L) 45° OHV V16	296	
1933	Series 452C	452 cu in (7.41 L) 45° OHV V16	126	
1934	Series 452D	452 cu in (7.41 L) 45° OHV V16	60	
1935	Series 452E	452 cu in (7.41 L) 45° OHV V16	50	
1936	Series 36-90	452 cu in (7.41 L) 45° OHV V16	52	Redesignated Series 90
1937	Series 37-90	452 cu in (7.41 L) 45° OHV V16	50	Final year of first generation (49–50 units)
1938	Series 38-90	431 cu in (7.06 L) 135° L-head V16	315	Second-generation redesign, introduced october 1937
1939	Series 39-90	431 cu in (7.06 L) 135° L-head V16	138	
1940	Series 40-90	431 cu in (7.06 L) 135° L-head V16	61	Production ended in december 1939 (51–61 units)
Total (1930–1940)			4,076	Total of 10-year production

== Gallery ==
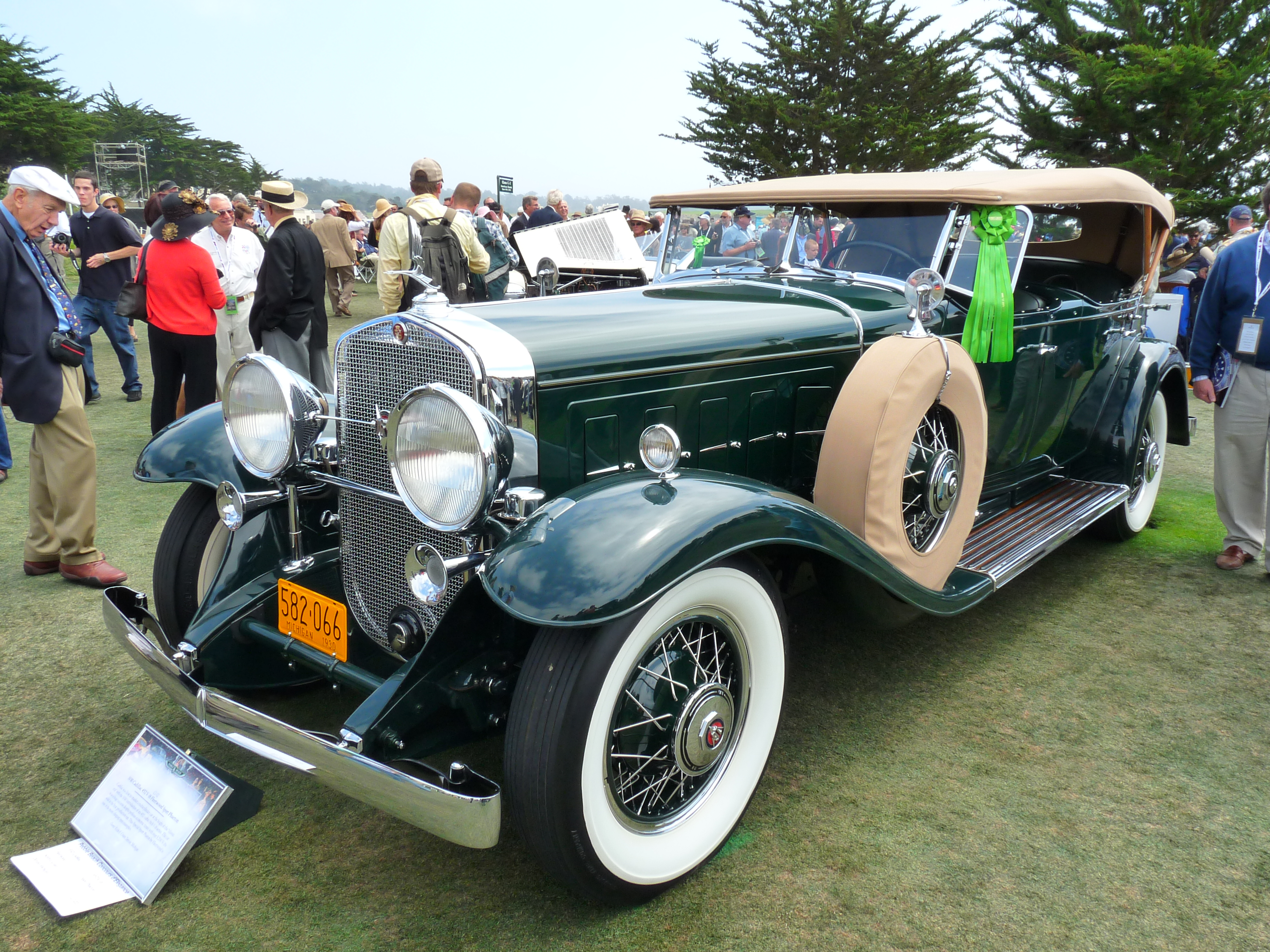
Cadillac Series 452 Sport Phaeton (1930)

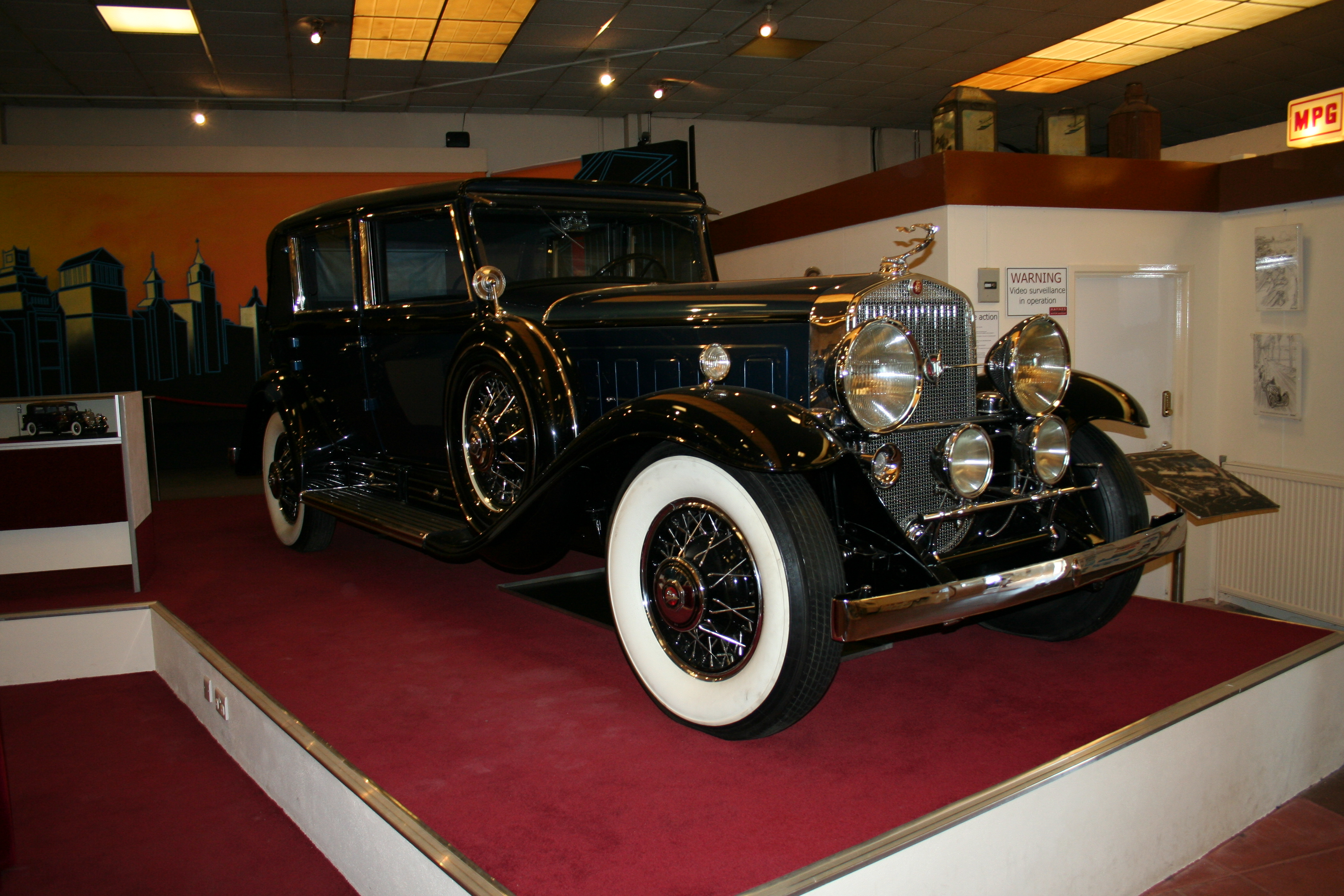
Cadillac Series 452 Madame X (1930)

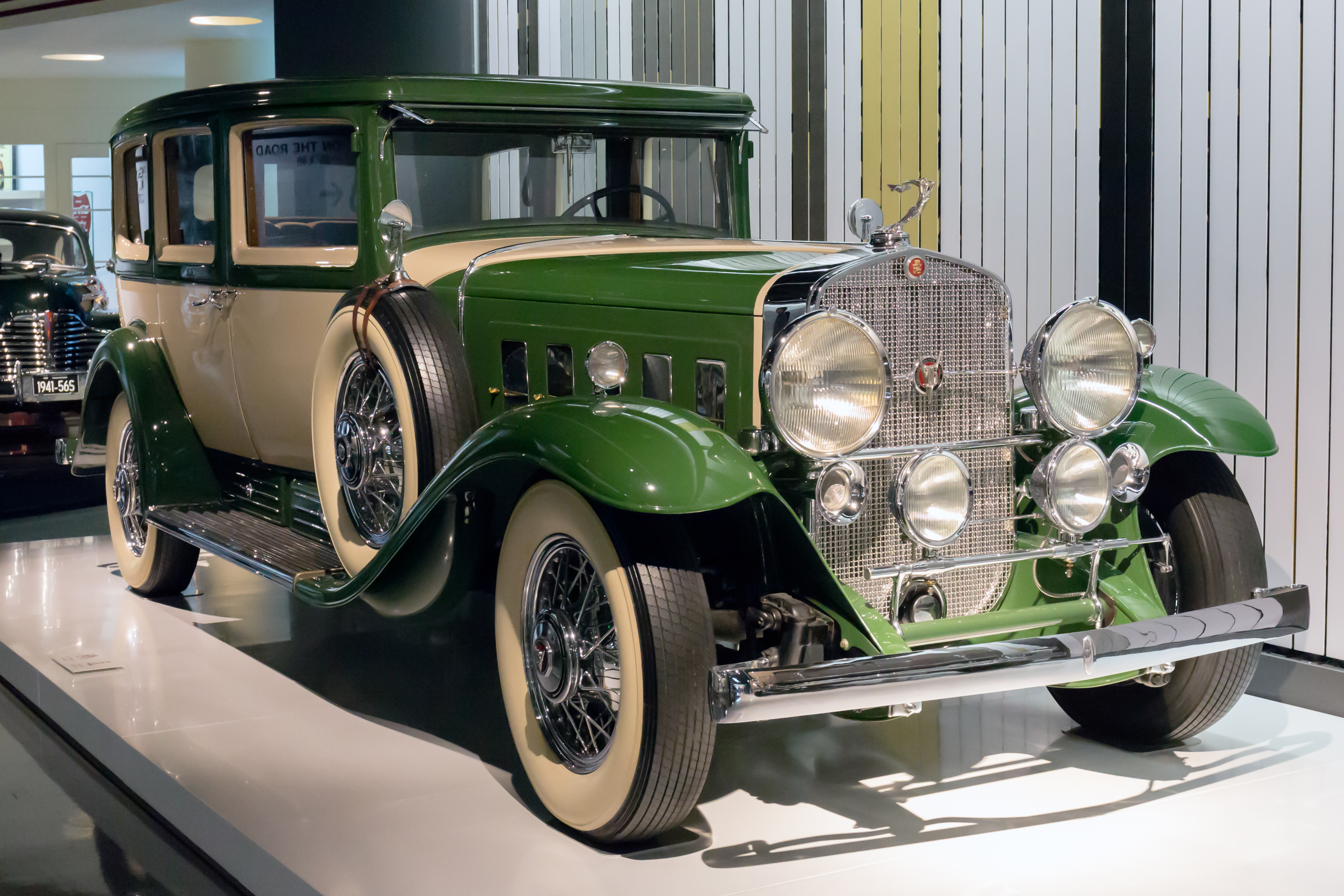
Cadillac Series 452A by Fleetwood (1931)

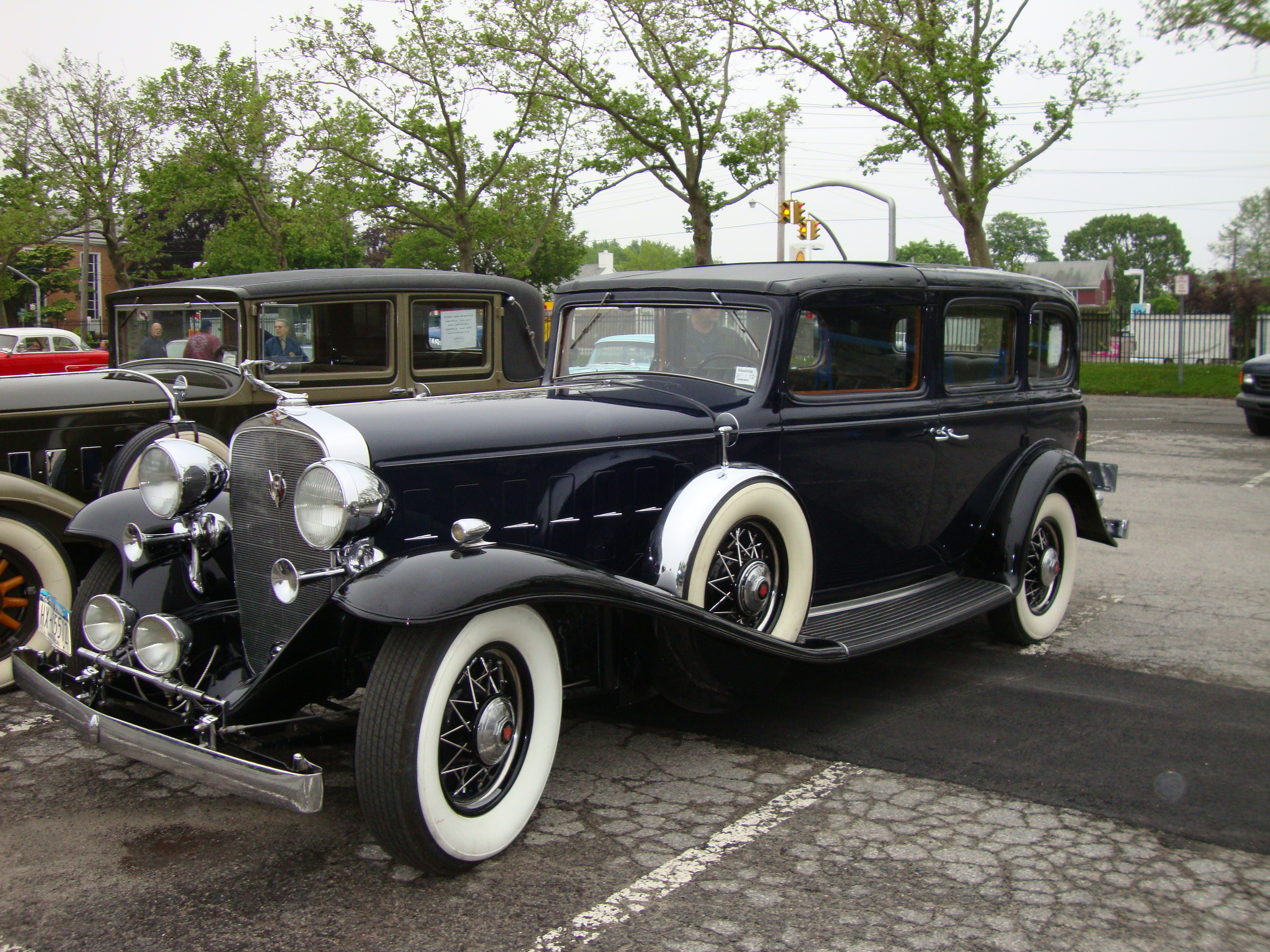
Cadillac Series 452B (1932)

Cadillac 452C Convertible Coupe (1933)

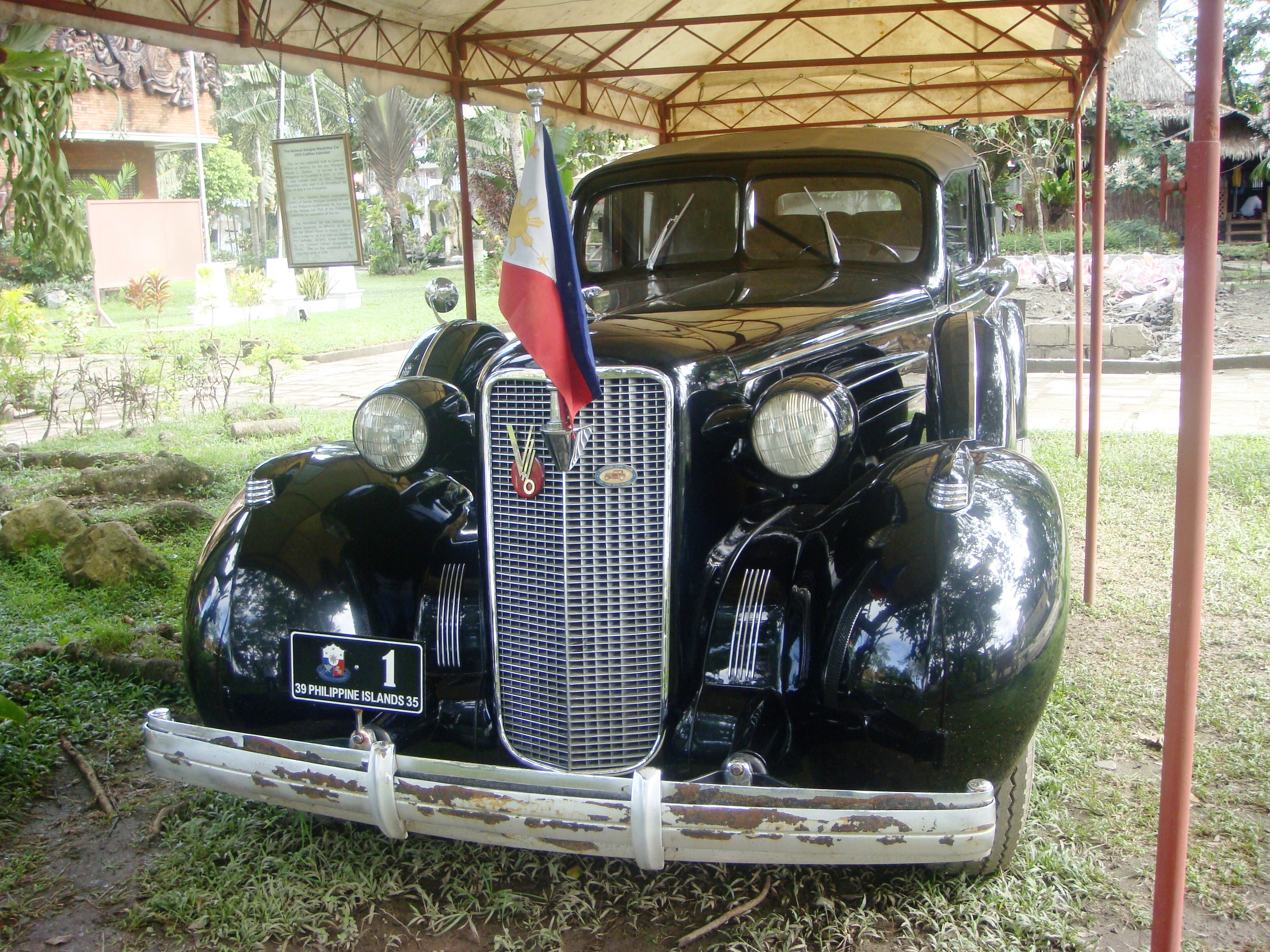
Cadillac Series 90 General Douglas MacArthur (1937)

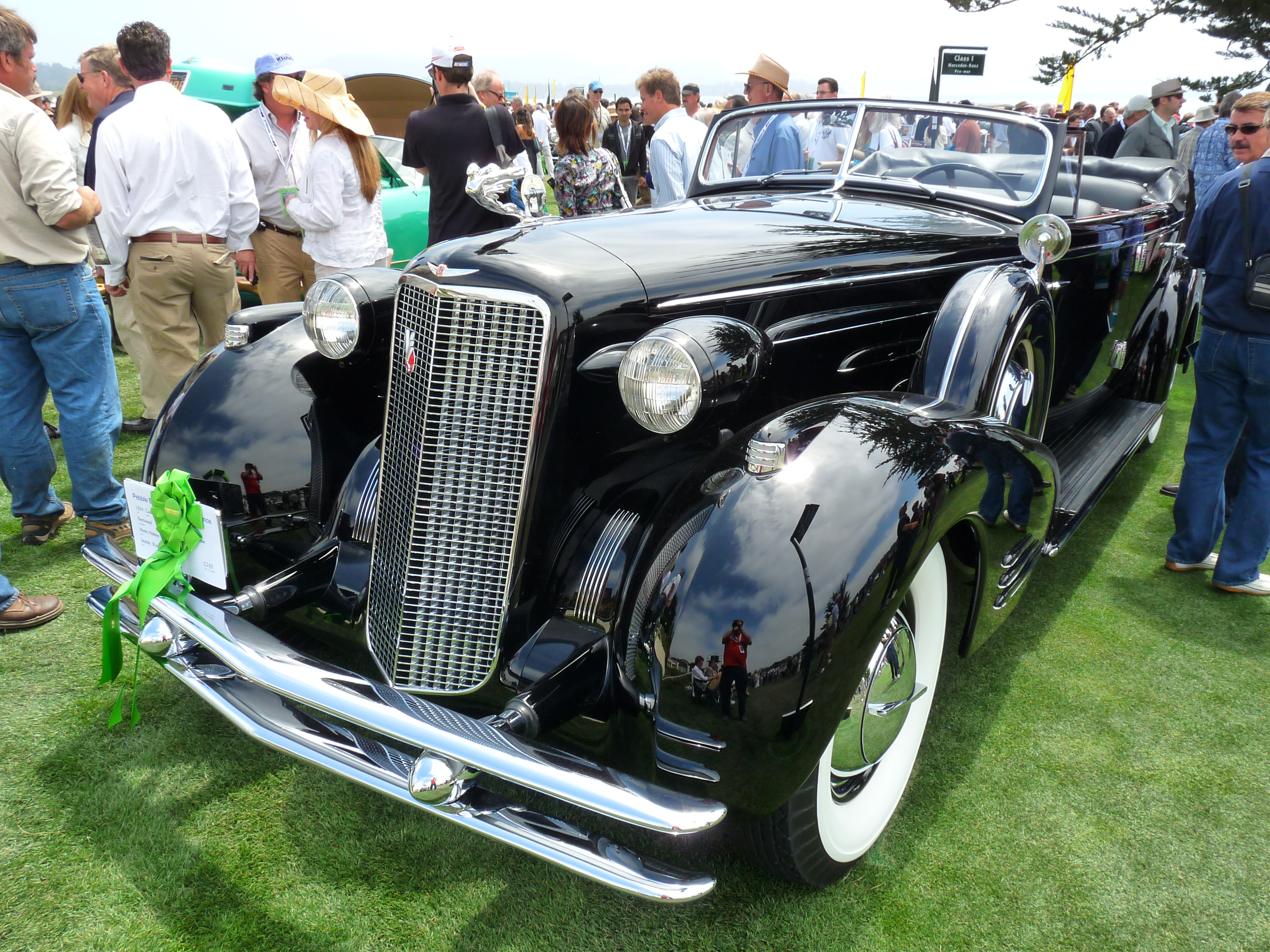
Cadillac Series 452D convertible (1934)

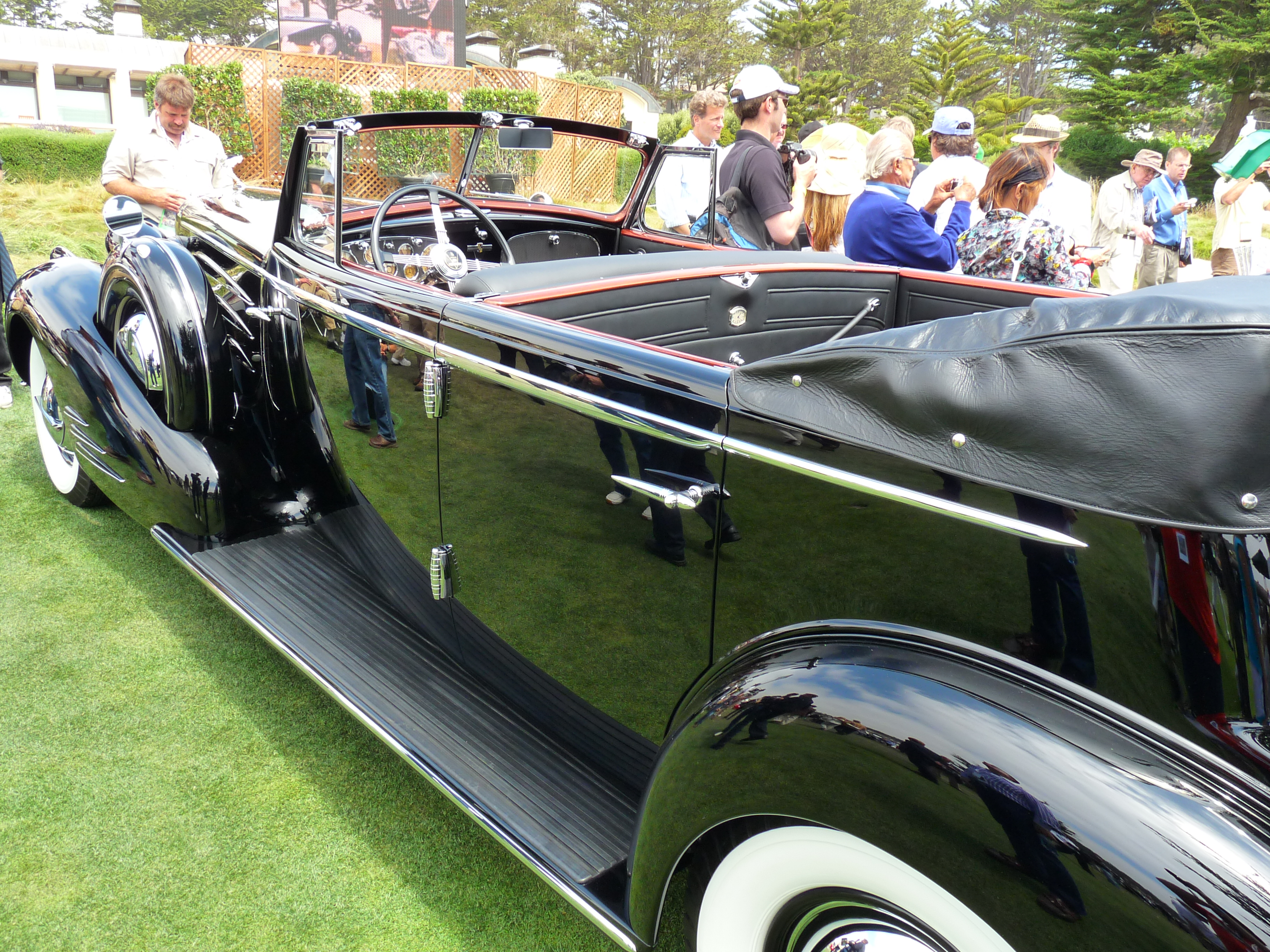
Cadillac Series 452D convertible (1934)

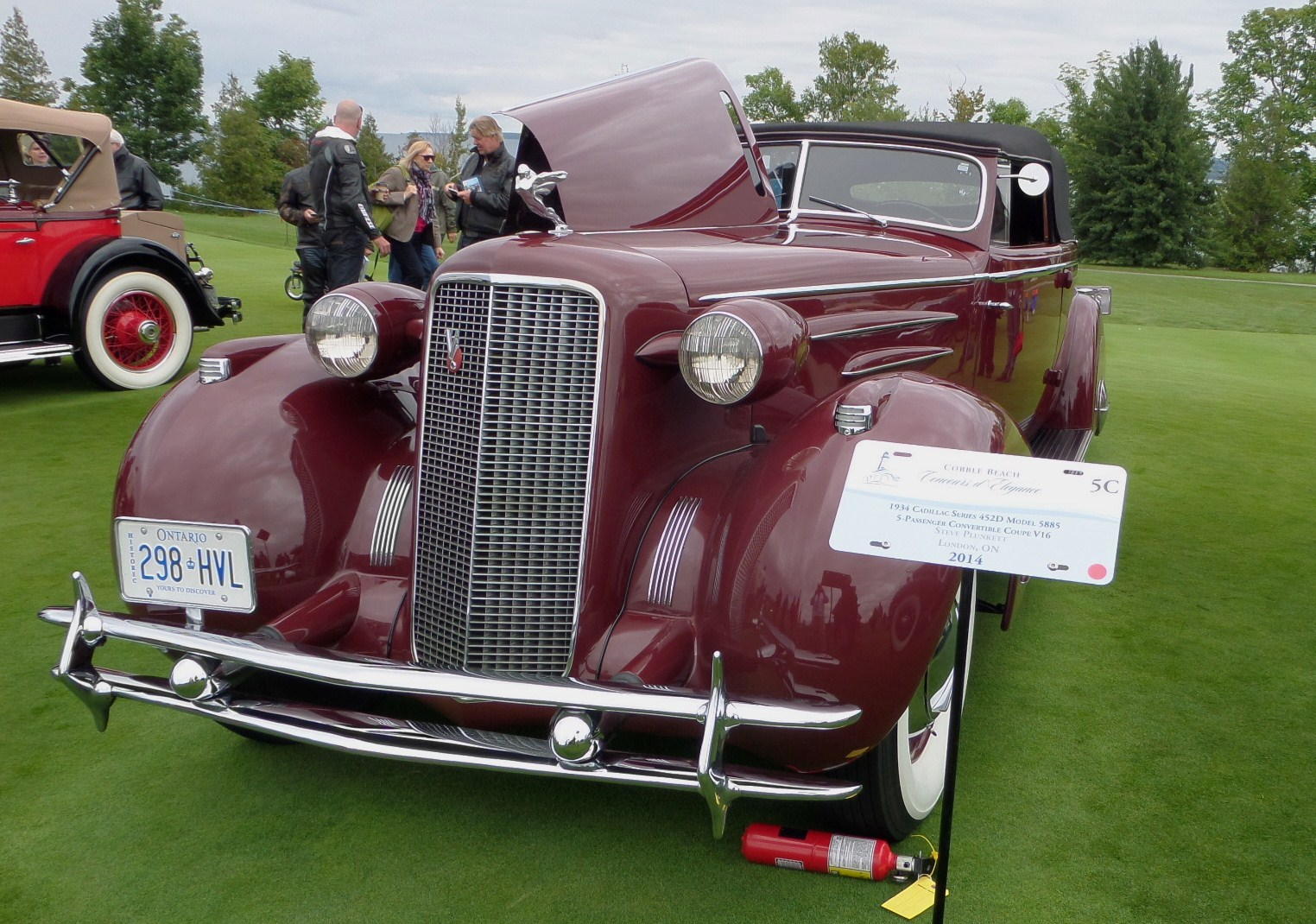
Cadillac series 452D convertible (1934)

Cadillac Series 452D Convertible Coupe (1935)

== 1938–1940 ==
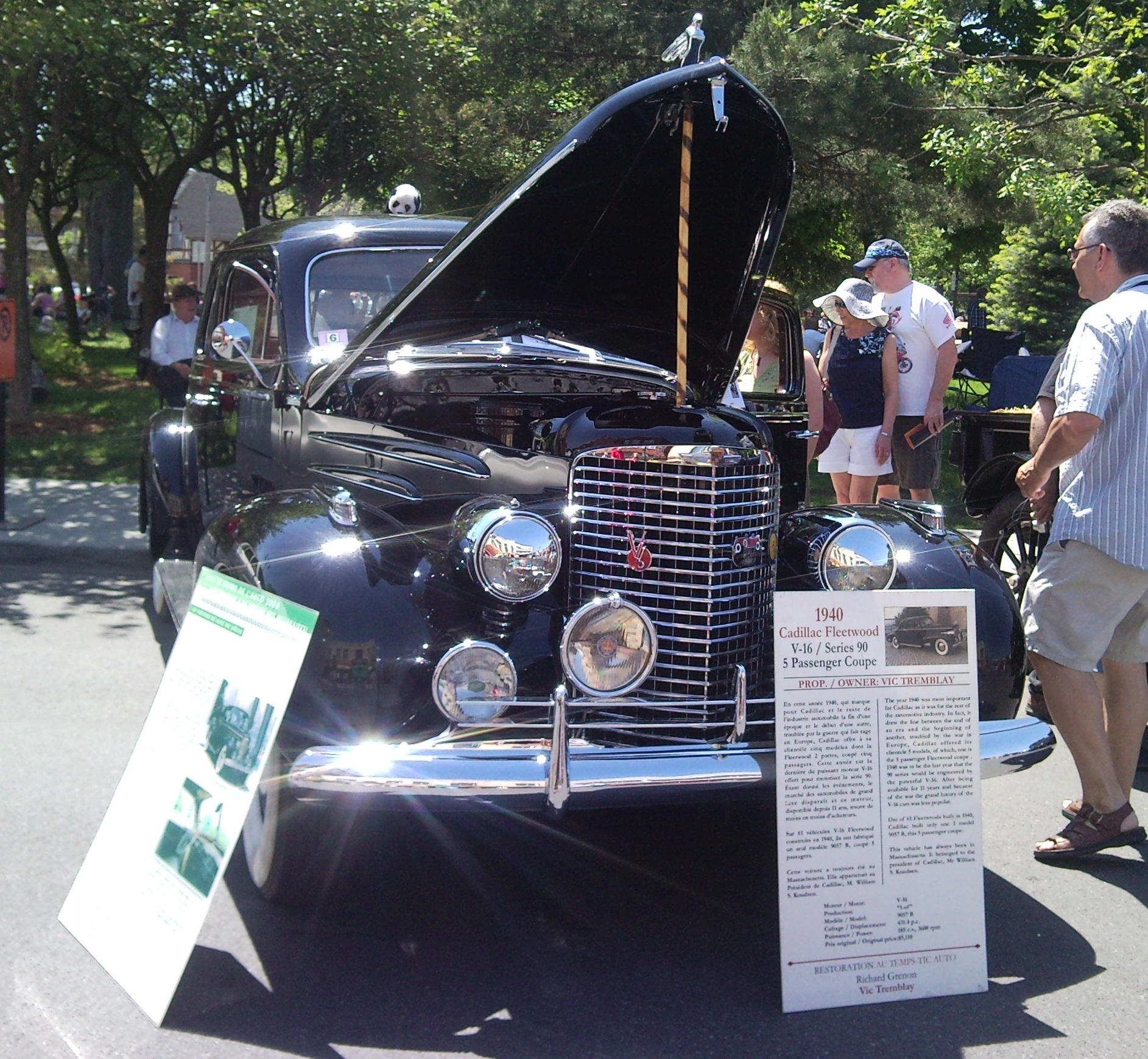
1940 Cadillac Series 90 coupe

Generation 2 (Series 90)
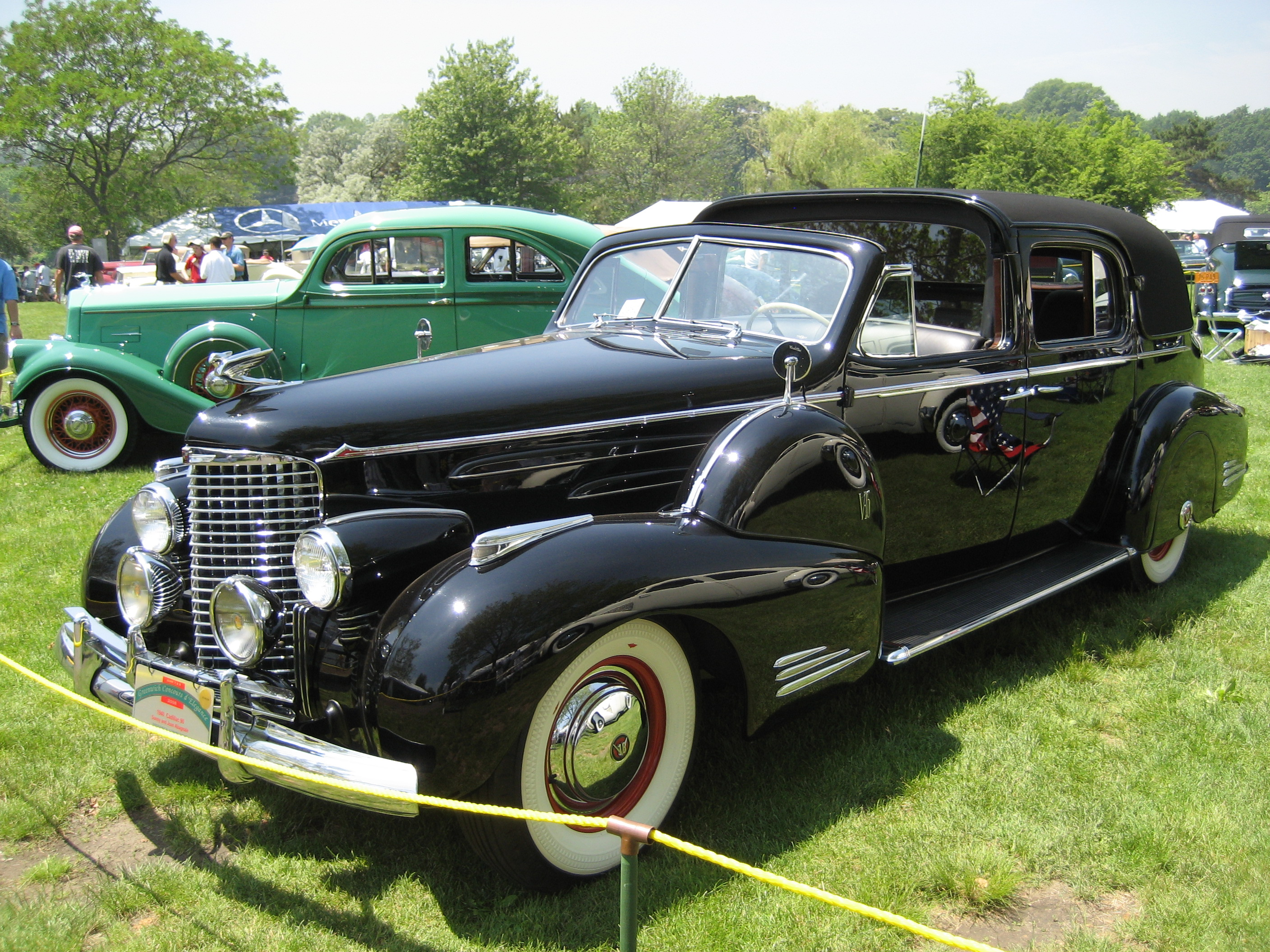
- 1940 Cadillac Series 90 Town Car by Fleetwood

Overview
- Model years: 1938–1940

Body and chassis
- Platform: D-body
- Related: Cadillac Series 75; Buick Limited

Powertrain
- Engine: 431 cu in (7.1 L) Cadillac V16

Dimensions
- Wheelbase: 141.0 in (3,581 mm)
- Length: 255.6875 in (6,494 mm)
- Width: 77.6 in (1,971 mm)
- Height: 69.6 in (1,768 mm)
- Curb weight: 5,200–5,700 lb (2,400–2,600 kg)

The V-16 "Series 90" and V-12 "Series 80 and 85", were essentially merged for 1938 with the introduction of the new L-head V-16. The 431 cu in (7.1 L) engine was an in-block valve (i.e. flathead) design, and featured a wider 135° V-angle, twin carburetors, twin fuel pumps, twin distributors, twin water pumps, and a nine main bearing crankshaft (compared to the OHV V-16's five bearing crank) and produced the same 185 hp (138 kW) as later versions of the original V-16. This engine was nearly silent at idle and exceptionally smooth in operation. The wheelbase was reduced to 141.0 in (3,581 mm), the body remained 222.0 in (5,639 mm) in overall length. The "Sixteens" (as Cadillac referred to them) were basically series 75 cars with the new V-16 engine although they differed from the firewall forward from the V-8 cars and had several other trim differences. The instrument panels were identical to and changed yearly with the V-8 cars from 1938 to 1940. Only the '38 Sixteens had a horn button which had "Sixteen" in art deco script; the '39 and '40 models, like the V-8, had the Cadillac crest on the button. 315 were sold in the first year, 138 in the next. The production of the 1940 models ended in December 1939. The most expensive model documented was the 1940 Series 90 Town Car by Fleetwood at US$7,175 ($166,072 in 2025 dollars) using a 141 in (3,581 mm) wheelbase.

== Today ==
The Cadillac V-16 is today recognized as one of the finest automobiles of the prewar era by many authorities. The Classic Car Club of America rates all V-16s as CCCA Full Classics, a rating reserved for only the finest automobiles of the 1925–1948 period.

== Concept car ==
In 2003, Cadillac created a concept car called the Sixteen, which used a 13.6 litre V-16 engine that developed 1,000 bhp (746 kW; 1,014 PS). Even though it used the current "A&S" (Art & Science) style of design that is Cadillac's stylistic hallmark, it shared many small details from the classic V-16. The Sixteen is also known to have the steering wheel logo carved out of solid crystal and a Bulgari clock.

== See also ==
- Opel Regent
