= SGV (automobile) =

Defunct American motor vehicle manufacturer

SGV Company
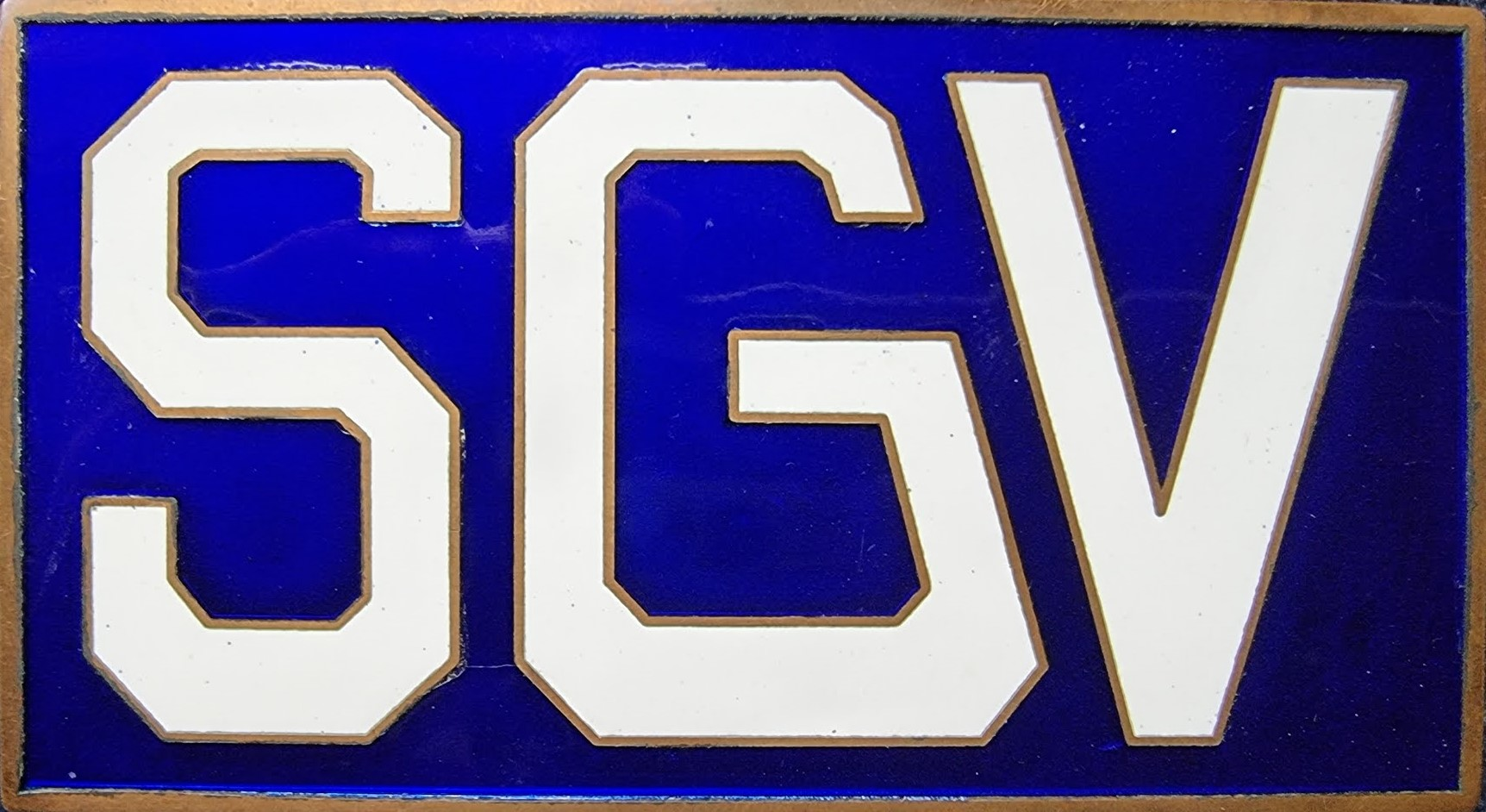
- SGV Radiator Emblem
- Industry: Automotive
- Predecessor: Acme Motor Car Company
- Founded: 1911; 115 years ago
- Founder: Herbert M. Sternbergh, Robert E. Graham, Fred Van Tine
- Defunct: 1916; 110 years ago
- Successor: Phianna Motor Company
- Headquarters: Reading, Pennsylvania, United States
- Key people: Herbert M. Sternbergh, Robert E. Graham and Fred Van Tine, R. J. Metzler
- Products: luxury car
- Production output: unknown - hundreds (1911-1916)

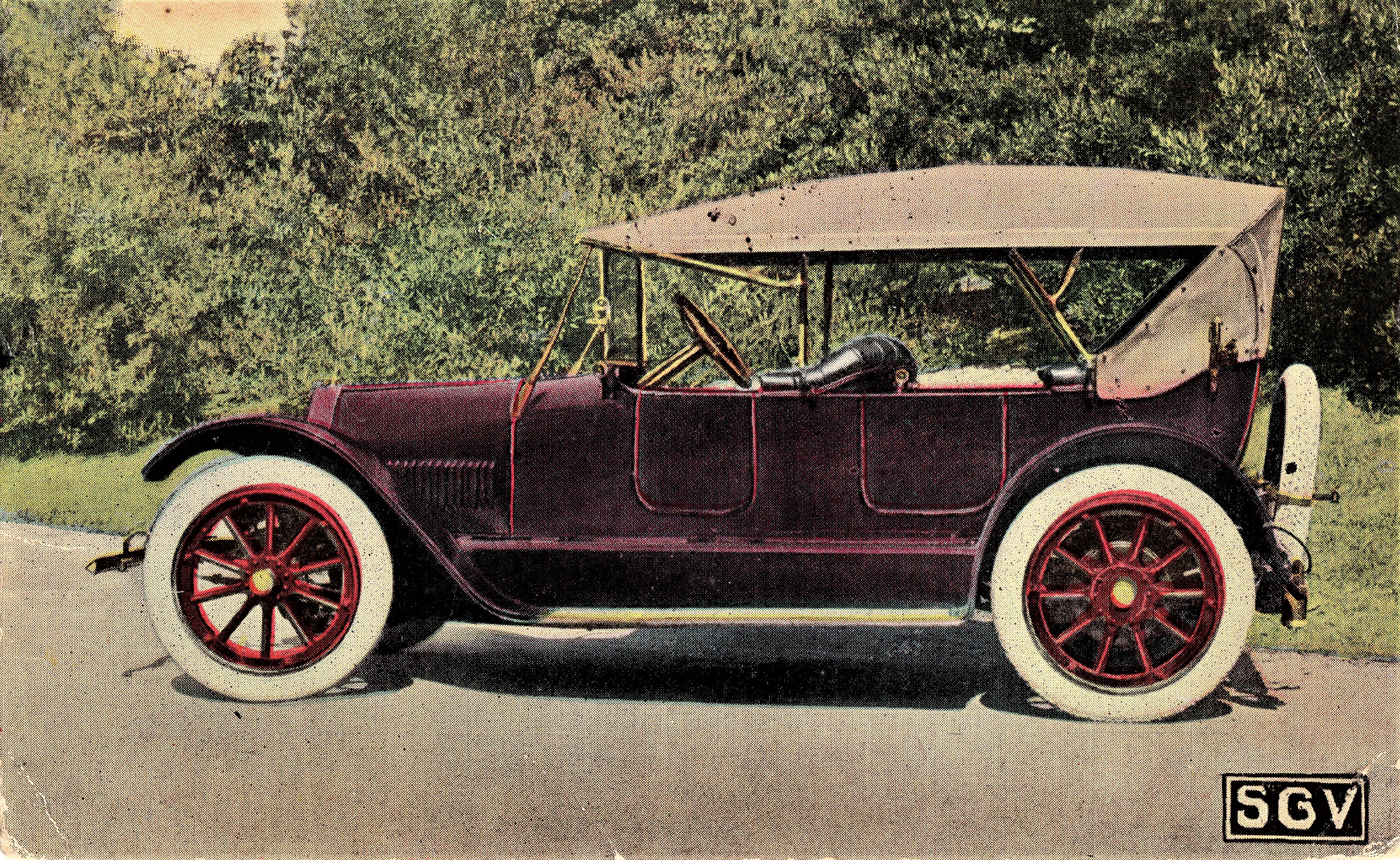
1914 SGV Touring car postcard

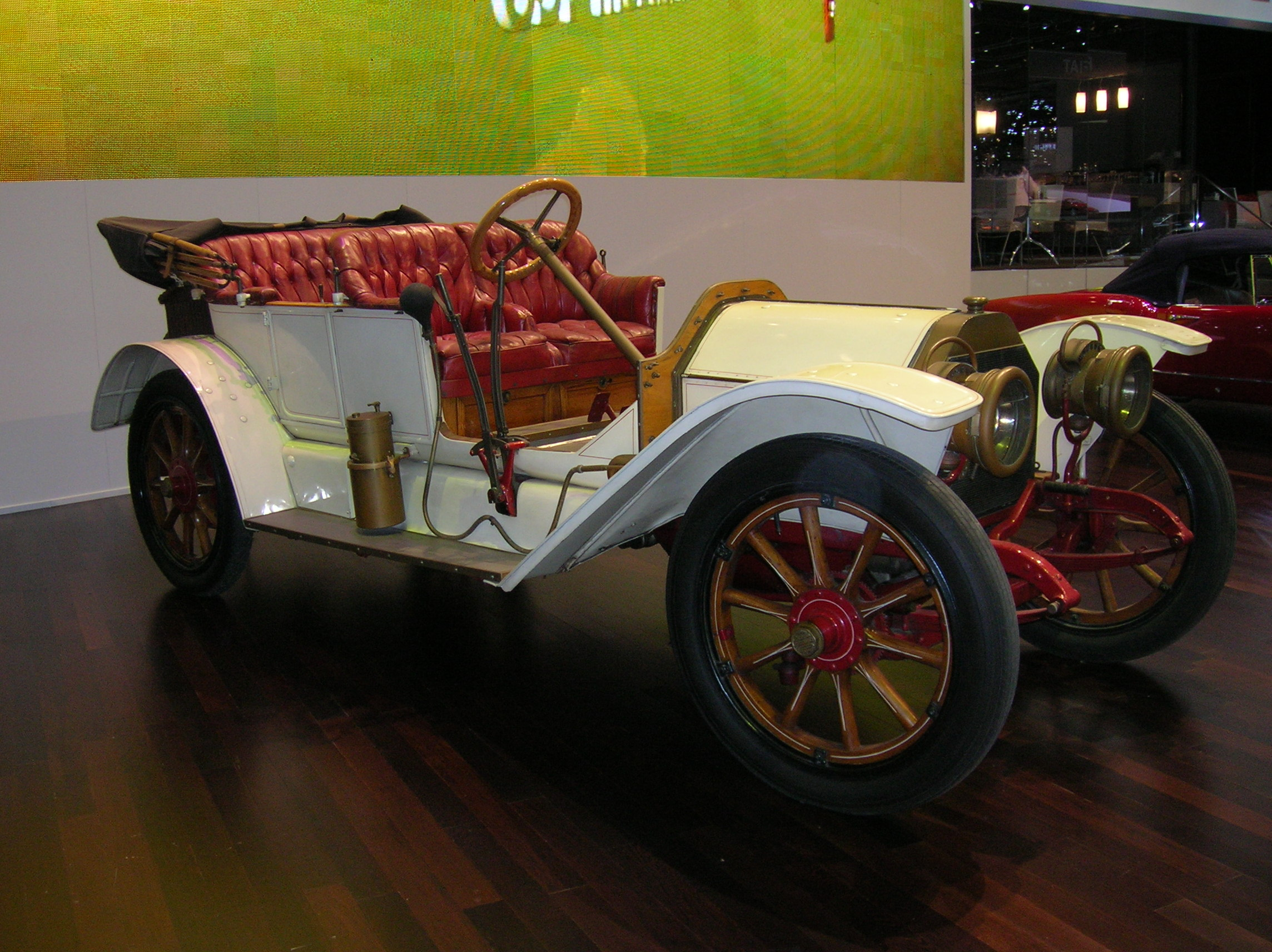
Lancia Beta on which the SGV was based

SGV was a Brass Era American automobile manufacturer that made luxury automobiles using Lancia components, from 1911 to 1916.

== History ==
=== Origin ===
The Acme Motor Car Company sold its site and plant to J H Sternbergh for $72,100 in May 1911. Sternbergh in turn sold the Acme Motor Car Company and leased it plant to a New York consortium. The company's name was changed to SGV. SGV Company was named for Herbert M. Sternbergh, Robert E. Graham and Fred Van Tine, the owners of the company and formerly with Acme. Fred Van Tine was the shop manager and designer of the car. Herbert Sternbergh died in March 1913.

Acme had been making SGV models since 1910. This was a high-quality product, based on the Lancia Beta with a relatively small 3.1 litres (190 cu in), 25-hp 4-cylinder engine with pressure lubrication and a hot water jacket over the inlet manifold. Shaft-drive and a low frame that was up-swept over the rear axle were featured and the dash was made with Circassian walnut.

=== SGV Company ===
Newspapers of the time described the SGV as lightweight and mechanically efficient. The Lancia engine was used with a four speed transmission. The steering radius was noted being small, making the car maneuverable in city traffic.

With the sale to SGV in 1911, the new company produced eight models including a limousine, touring car, torpedo, toy tonneau, and roadster models. They were priced from $2,500 to $3,500 (equivalent to $120,937 in 2025), and achieved 15 to 20 mpg.

In December 1912 a 35-hp car, the model D, was introduced. A Coupe-Landaulet model was priced at $4,000, equivalent to $133,448 in 2025. Custom coachwork from Quinby and Fleetwood were available that could increase the price up to $12,000.

The SGV was a high-class small car in the same class as the Brewster. SGV was sold in New York City by Hol-Tan and Gotham Motor Car Company. In San Francisco the E. Stewart Automobile Company sold a large amount of SGV's.

S.G.V. decided to try the Vulcan (Cutler-Hammer) four-speed electric gearshift, mounted in the steering wheel spoke and push button actuated. This resulted in one of the industry’s very early recalls (a 40 car shipment of SGV cars) and created bad publicity for the company that already had shaky finances.

=== Demise ===
In the summer of 1915, the entire S.G.V. plant went on the auction block. Press reported the inventory included "thirty-two complete chassis of the latest model 1915, 100 assorted up-to-date Quinby and Fleetwood bodies, a large quantity of radiators, etc." R. J. Metzler bought the factory and said he planned to continue the S.G.V. in manufacture. Metzler partnered with industrialists John A. Bell and T. M. Pepperday, who in 1916, sold the plant and moved production from Reading to Newark, New Jersey. Only one SGV was built in Newark before Metzler joined with a consortium of several other businessmen who went on to produce the Phianna based on the SGV.

== Motor Racing ==
An SGV was entered in the 1911 Vanderbilt cup race but did not compete. They also competed in the October San Francisco to Los Angeles and back endurance run with C Matthews driving.

== Advertisements ==
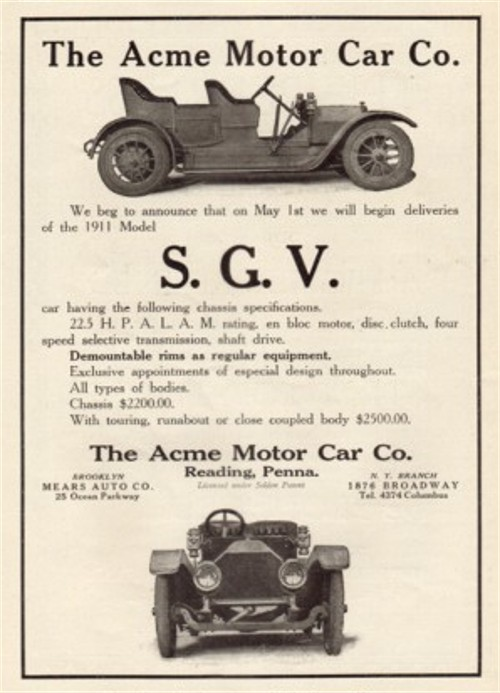
1911 SGV Touring car, Acme Motor Car Company in Motor Age magazine

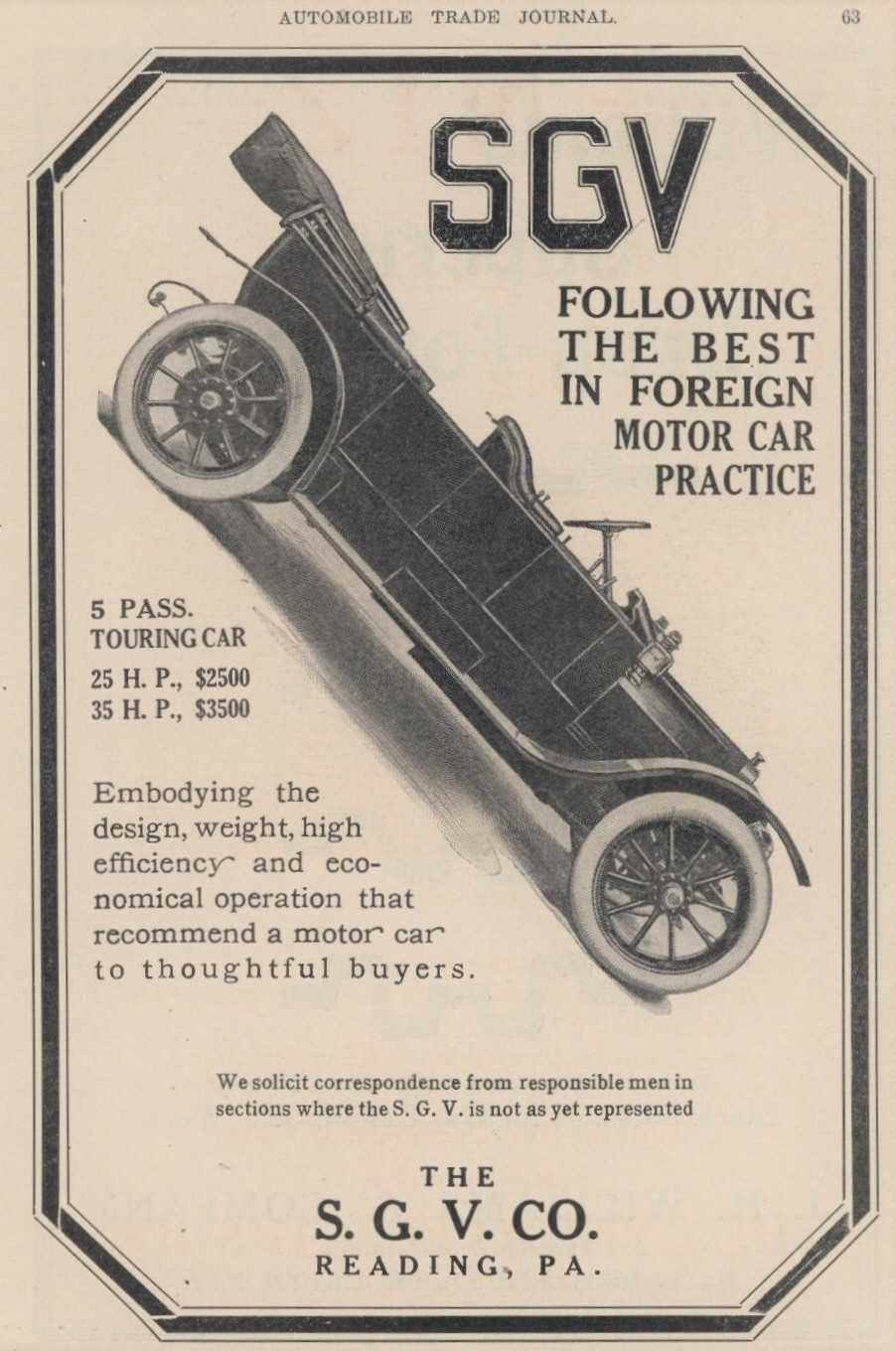
1913 SGV Touring Car advertisement - Automobile Trade Journal

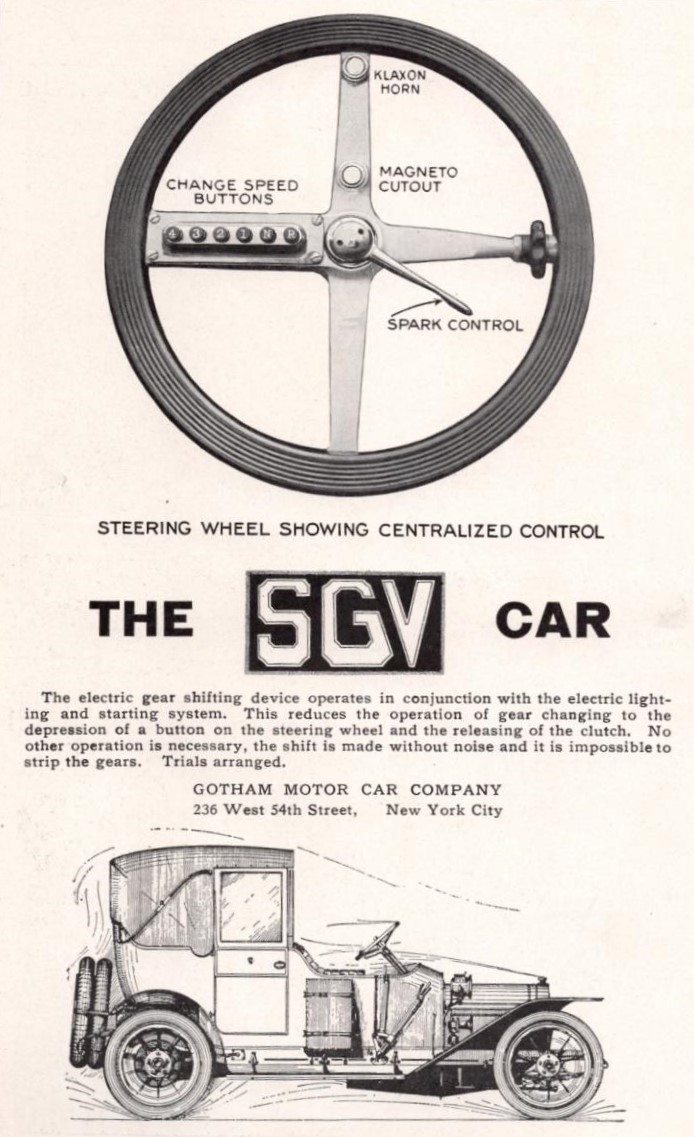
1914 SGV with Vulcan electric transmission advertisement in Motor Age

== See also ==
- Phianna (automobile)
- Lancia Beta (1909)
- Acme (automobile)
