= Phianna (automobile) =

Defunct American motor vehicle manufacturer

Phianna Motors Company M. H. Carpenter Company
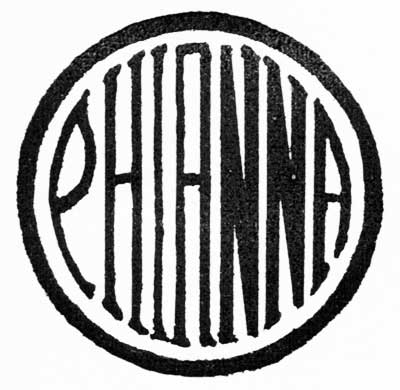
- The Foreign Car Made in America then America's Representative Among the World's Finest Cars
- Formerly: SGV Company
- Industry: Automotive
- Founded: 1916; 110 years ago
- Founder: R. J. Metzler, M. H. Carpenter
- Defunct: 1922; 104 years ago
- Fate: ceased operations
- Headquarters: Newark, New Jersey; Long Island City, New York, United States
- Key people: R. J. Metzler, M. H. Carpenter,
- Products: Automobiles
- Production output: less than 300 (1916-1922)

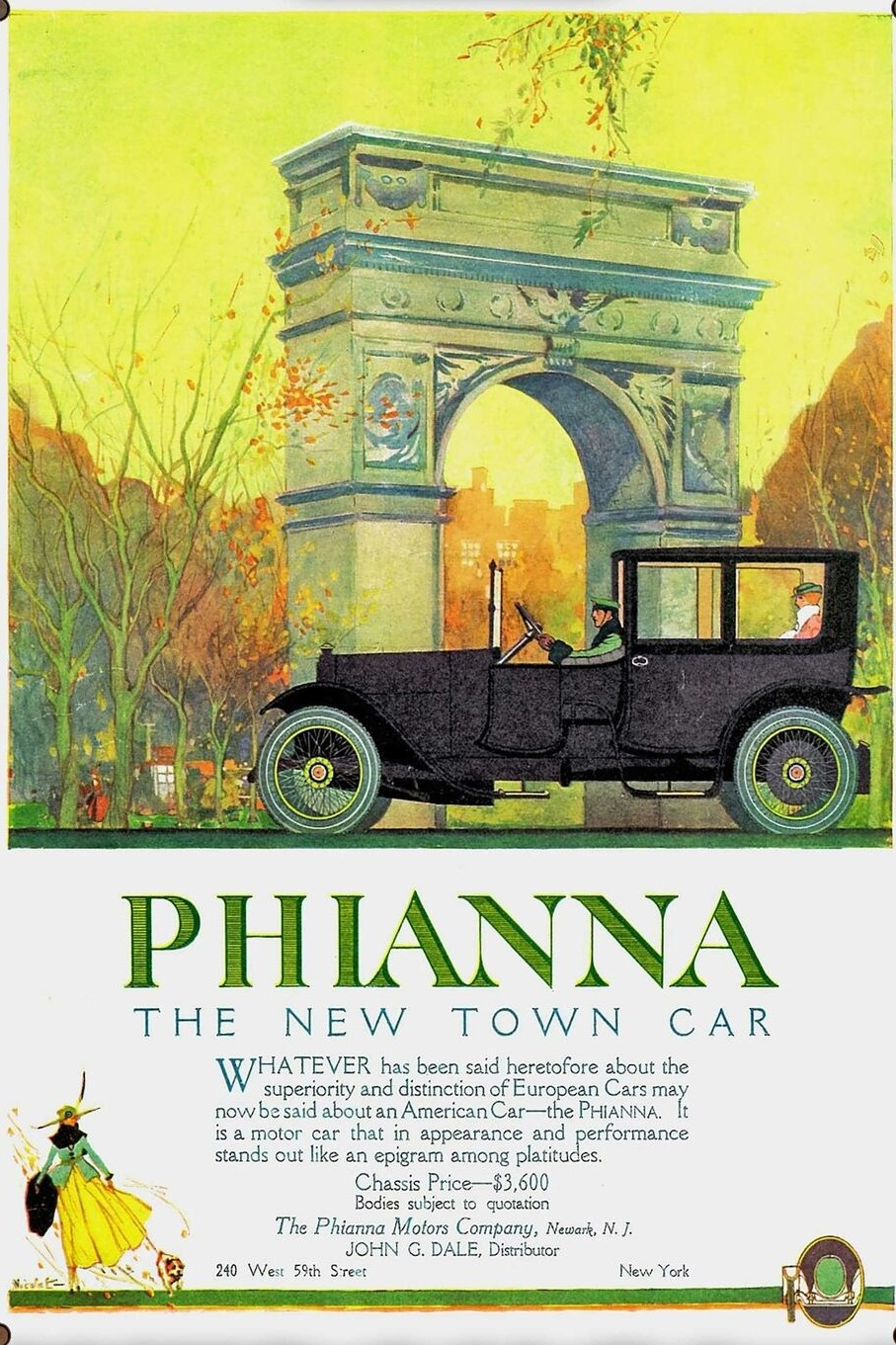
1917 Phianna Town Car advertisement

Phianna was an American luxury automobile manufactured from 1916 to 1922, first in Newark, New Jersey and then Long Island City, New York.

== History ==
=== Phianna Motors Company ===
The Phianna Motors Company was created in 1916 by R. J. Metzler. Metzler had acquired the SGV's equipment and production line in May 1915 prior to the company being wound up. SGV had fallen deeply into debt. Metzler partnered with industrialists John A. Bell and T. M. Pepperday, who moved production from Reading to Newark, New Jersey. The name Phianna originated from one of the companies twin daughters, Phyllis and Anna.

Phianna made one car based on the SGV, before changing to it own models. The 1916 Phianna was a $3,600 town car. The bodies were custom-built and chassis were available for coachwork. By 1917 Phianna's ranged in price from $5,000 to $6,000, equivalent to $150,779 in 2025.

The Phianna was reportedly very popular with heads of government and officials in the United States.

=== M. H. Carpenter Company ===
With the United States entry into World War I, in 1918 the Phianna factory was used to make tools and dies for the Wright-Martin Aircraft Company. The Phianna company put its assets up for sale and Miles Harold Carpenter, an automobile enthusiast who had purchased a Phianna, with assistance from a Texas rancher, Carl M Worsham, acquired the assets. A new plant was set up at the end of 59th Street, Long Island City.

Miles Carpenter was an automotive designer who had worked for Pierce Arrow and Chalmers among others in a varied career. The Phianna was hand-built including its four-cylinder engine of polished aluminum and a wooden cooling fan designed by Fred Charavey. An update version on a 125-inch wheelbase and a new radiator design changing from the Brewster style oval to a more popular Rolls-Royce style was ready for the 1919 auto shows. The Phianna was a prestige car, prices ranging from $6,000 for a standard brougham, to $9,500 (equivalent to $176,416 in 2025) for a special touring car, to $11,500 for a limousine.

Innovative safety glass was introduced in 1919 as were turn signals and stop lights. Carpenter changed the company's motto from The Foreign Car Made in America to America's Representative Among the World's Finest Cars. The company also introduced an innovative six-cylinder engine in 1919 that saw limited production. Phianna could list owners such as the King of Spain, the President of Brazil and Bainbridge Colby, Secretary of State.

Miles Carpenter built Phiannas for Glenn Curtiss using the OX-5 engine with a view to setting up a Curtiss car company. With the depression of 1921 Carpenter, on advice from Mortimer L. Schiff, decided to stop production and close down the business. The final car was made in 1922 for John F Norman.

== Gallery ==
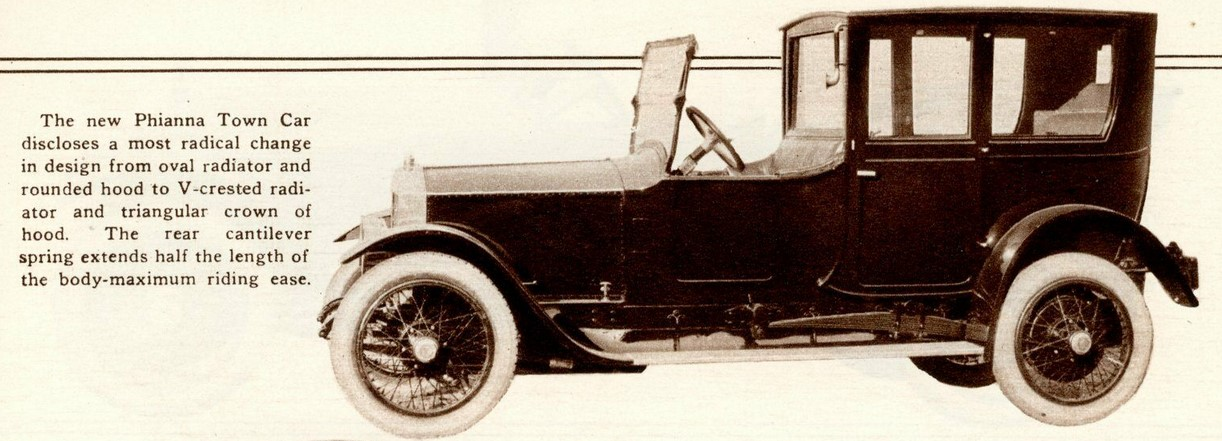
1919 Phianna Town Car - New York Auto Show display - Motor Life magazine

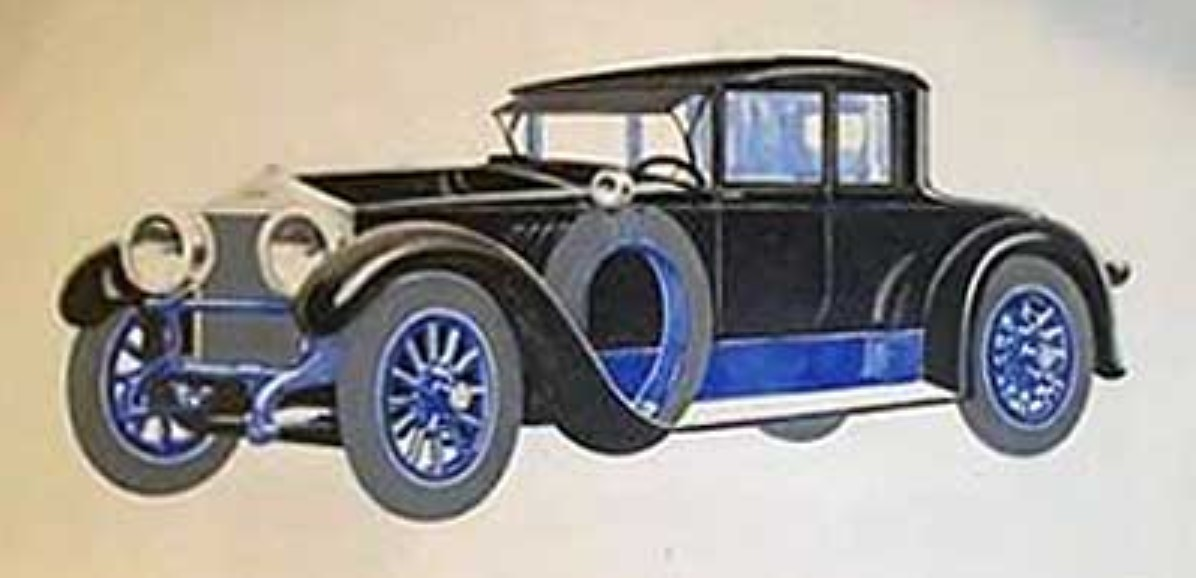
1920 Phianna Coupe from brochure illustrated by Ray Wilcox

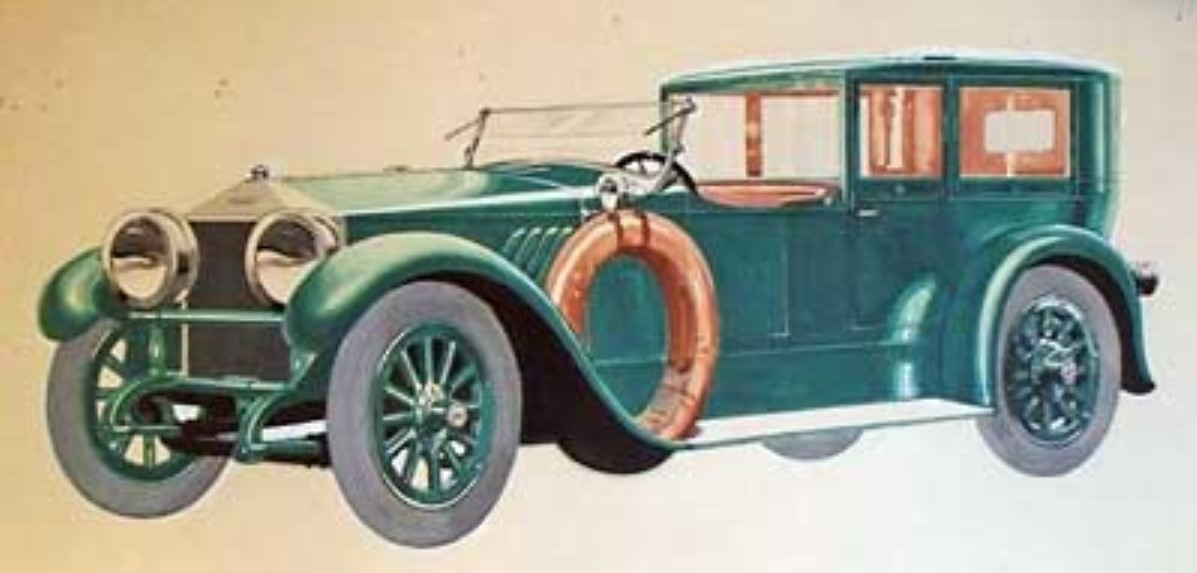
1920 Phianna Town Car from brochure illustrated by Ray Wilcox
