= Rolling chassis =

Incomplete motor vehicle with wheels

A rolling chassis is the fully assembled chassis of a motor vehicle (car, truck, bus, or other vehicle) without its bodywork. It is equipped with running gear (engine and drivetrain) and ready for delivery to a coachbuilder to be completed. Historically, bespoke luxury automobiles were finished inside and out to an owner's specifications by a coachbuilder, and specialty vehicles (such as fire engines) were outfitted by firms devoted to that task.

The term is also used to describe the chassis and running gear of a vehicle in a body-off restoration.

A variation is the cowl chassis where the chassis is supplied with the OEM bodywork forward of the firewall.

== Automobiles ==
Prior to unibodied vehicles, the rolling chassis stage was common to the manufacture of all motorcars. Mass-produced cars were supplied complete from the factory, but luxury cars such as Rolls-Royce were supplied as a chassis from the factory to several coachbuilders, in its case J Gurney Nutting & Co, Mulliner, Park Ward, and others. These handcrafters would supply a body and interior to a customer or dealer's specifications. Important names in the United States included LeBaron, Fleetwood, and Rollston.

Over time, top luxury automakers absorbed one or more of their vendors and moved vehicle finishing in-house.

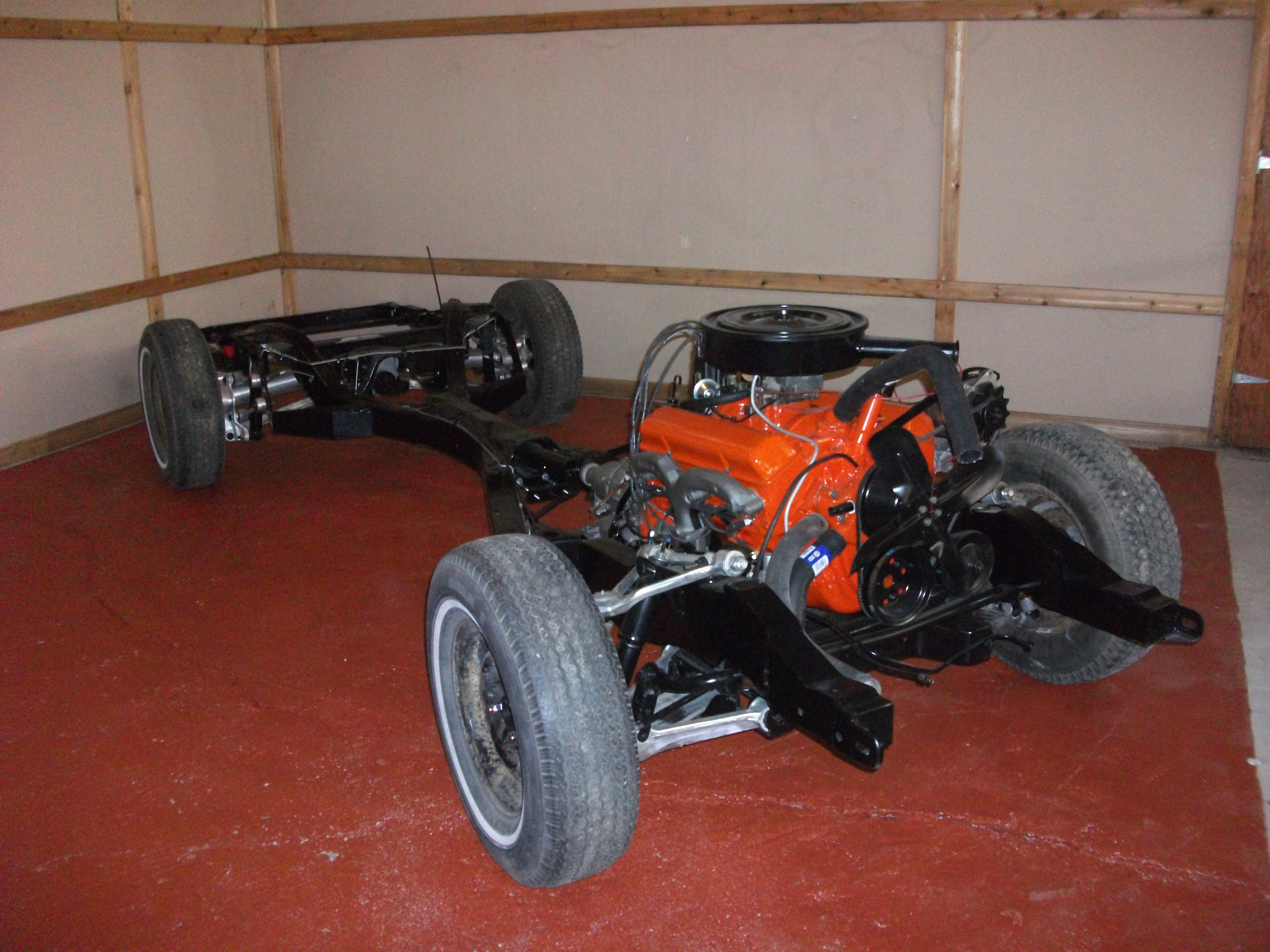
Rolling X-frame chassis

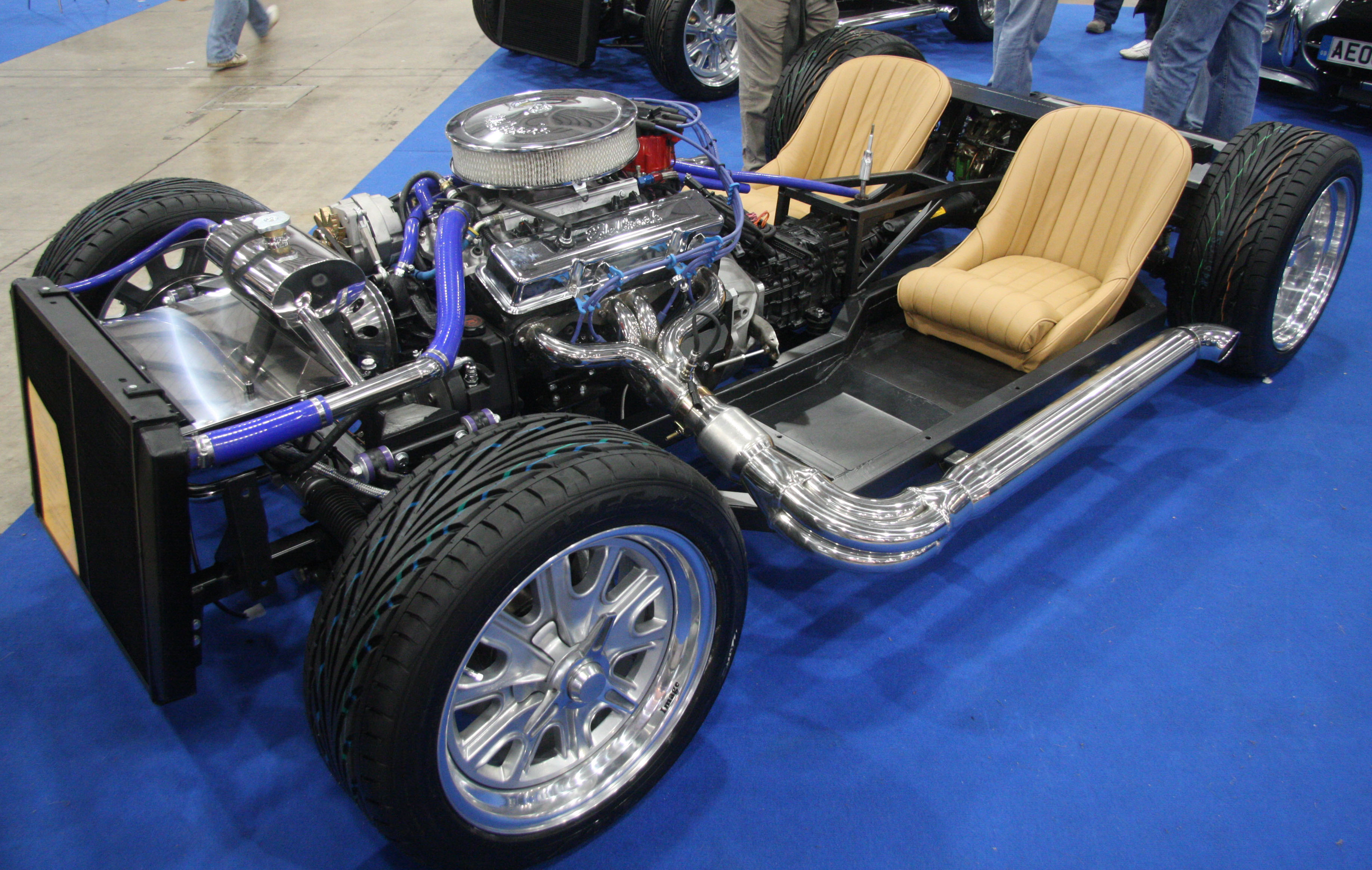
Rolling platform frame AK 427 Cobra replica rolling chassis

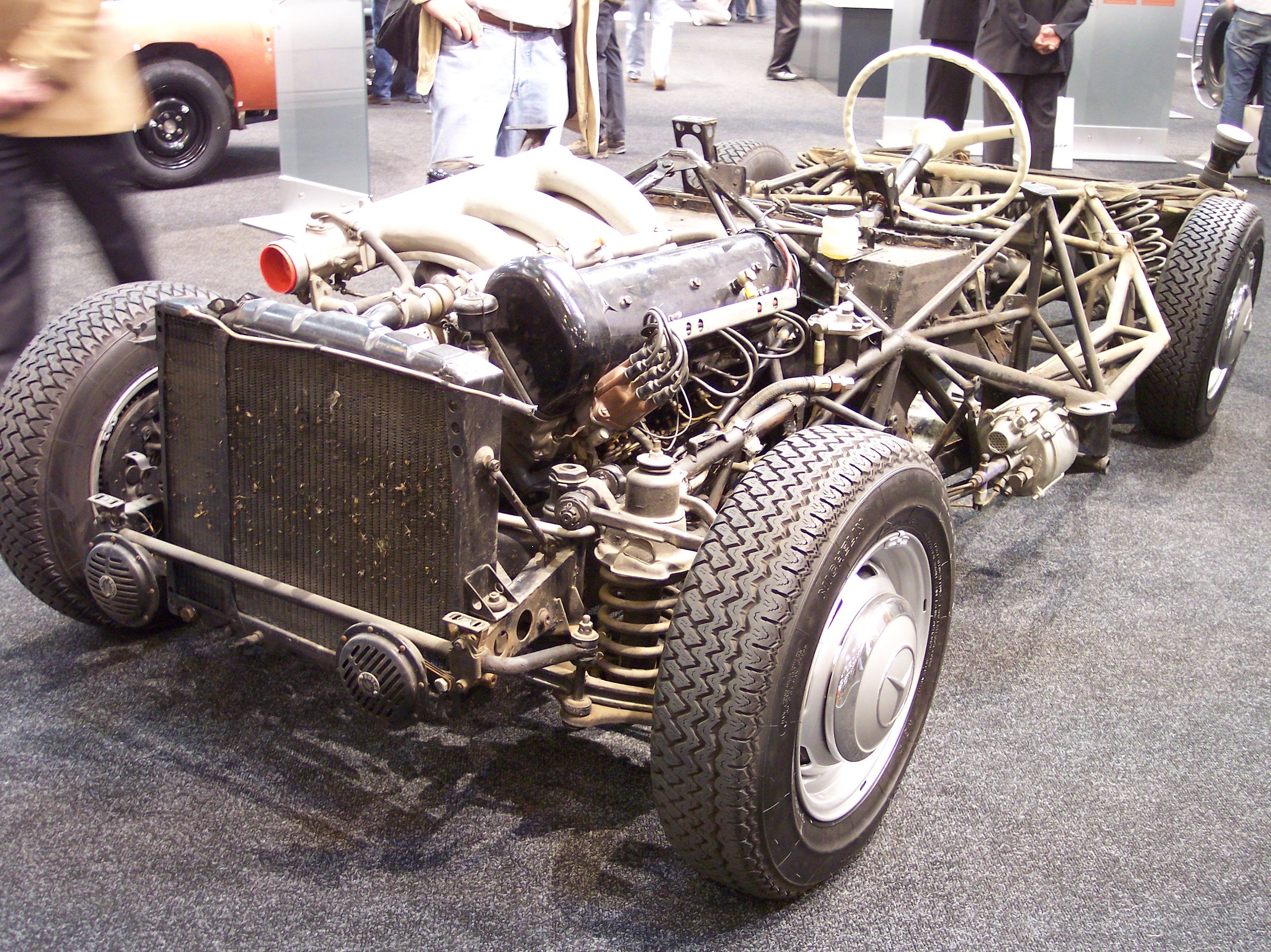
Hand-crafted space frame Mercedes 300 SL Gullwing W180 in "rolling chassis" form during restoration

== Heavy vehicles ==
Separate chassis remain in use for almost all heavy vehicles ranging from pickup trucks to the biggest trucks and commercial passenger-carrying vehicles.

The rolling chassis is delivered to the commercial body maker, coachbuilder, or bulk transporter on its own wheels, under its own power.

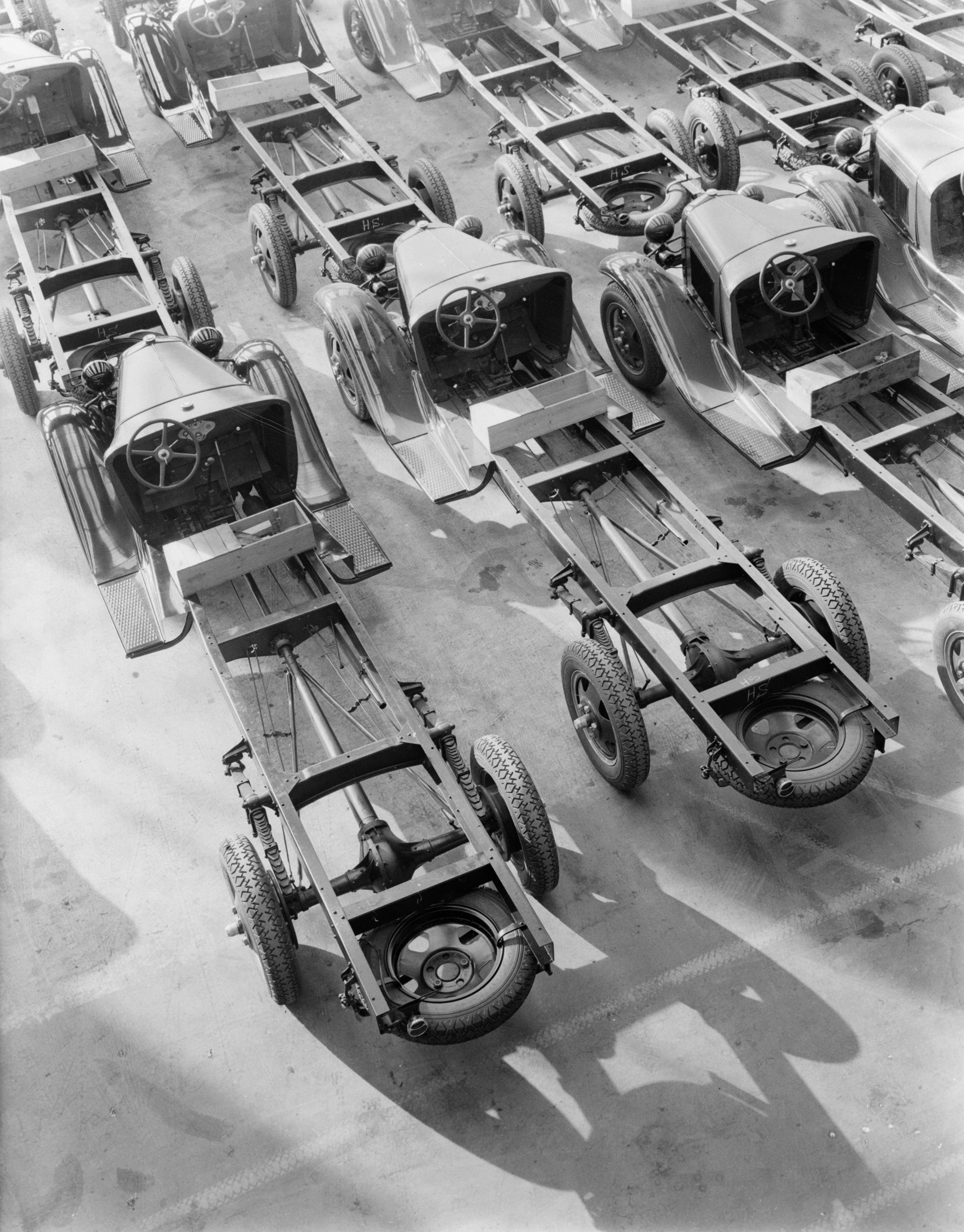
1932 cowl chassis for Ford vans

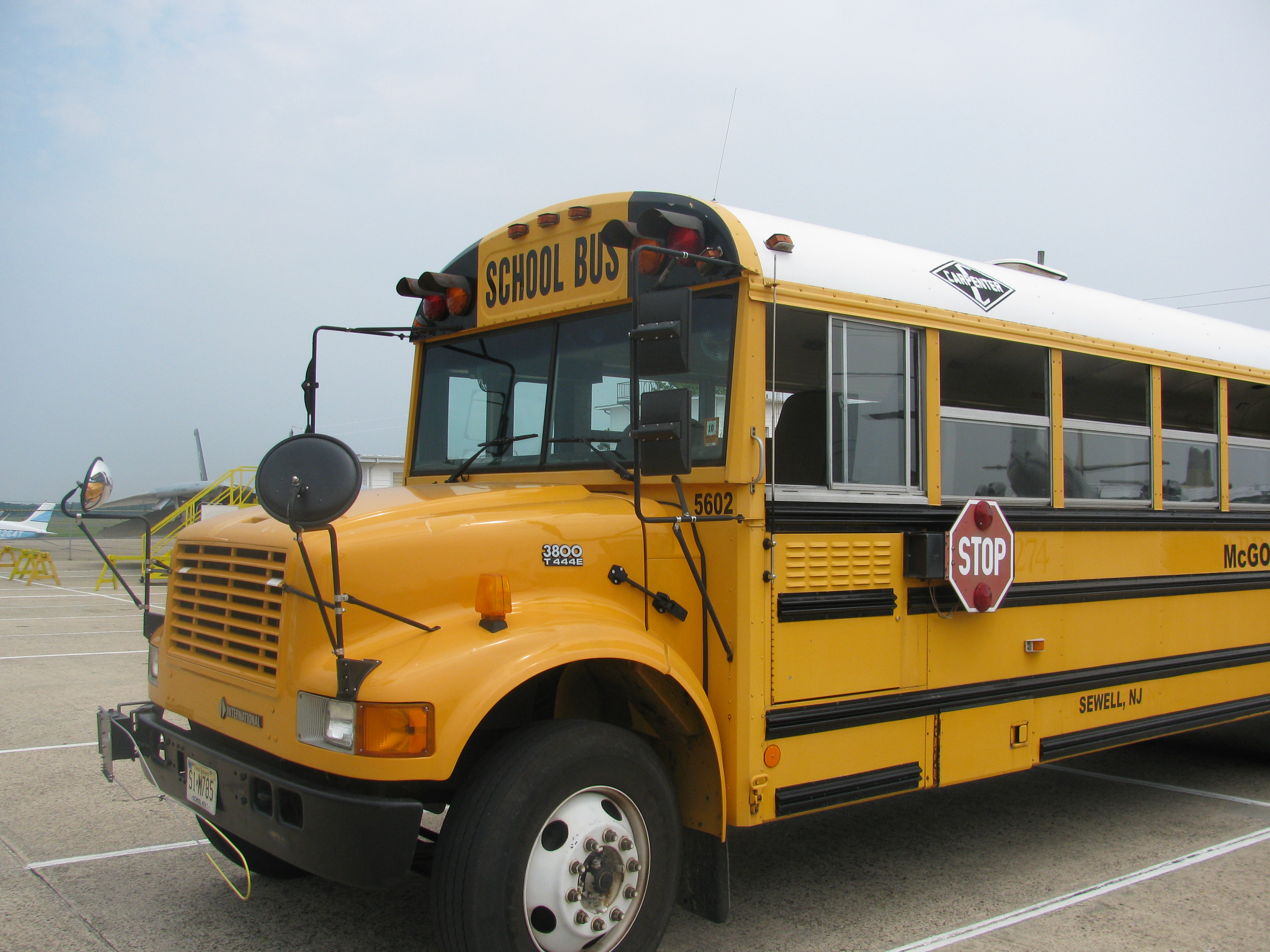
North American school buses are a classic example of a cowl chassis with a body added from the body manufacturer from the firewall back

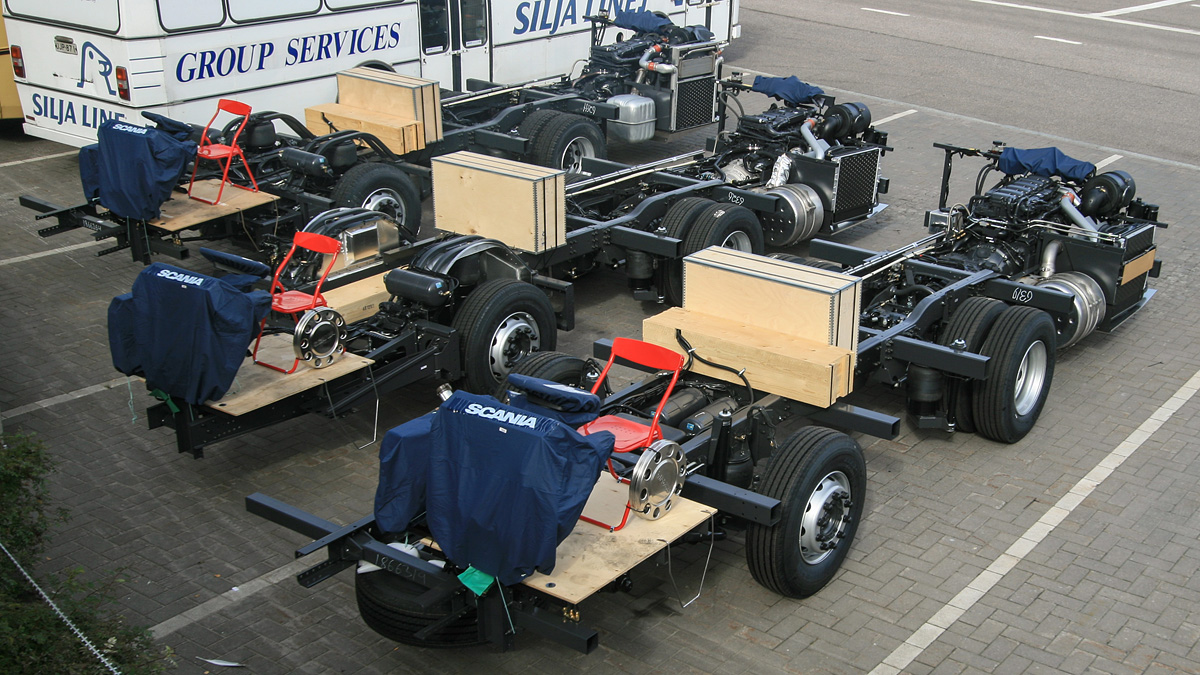
2009 Scania rolling chassis heading for bus body maker Lahden Autokori

== See also ==
- Glider (automobiles), an otherwise complete motor vehicle that lacks some or all of the powertrain
