= Fleetwood Metal Body =

Defunct American motor vehicle body manufacturer

Coordinates: 42.2977988°N 83.1197287°W

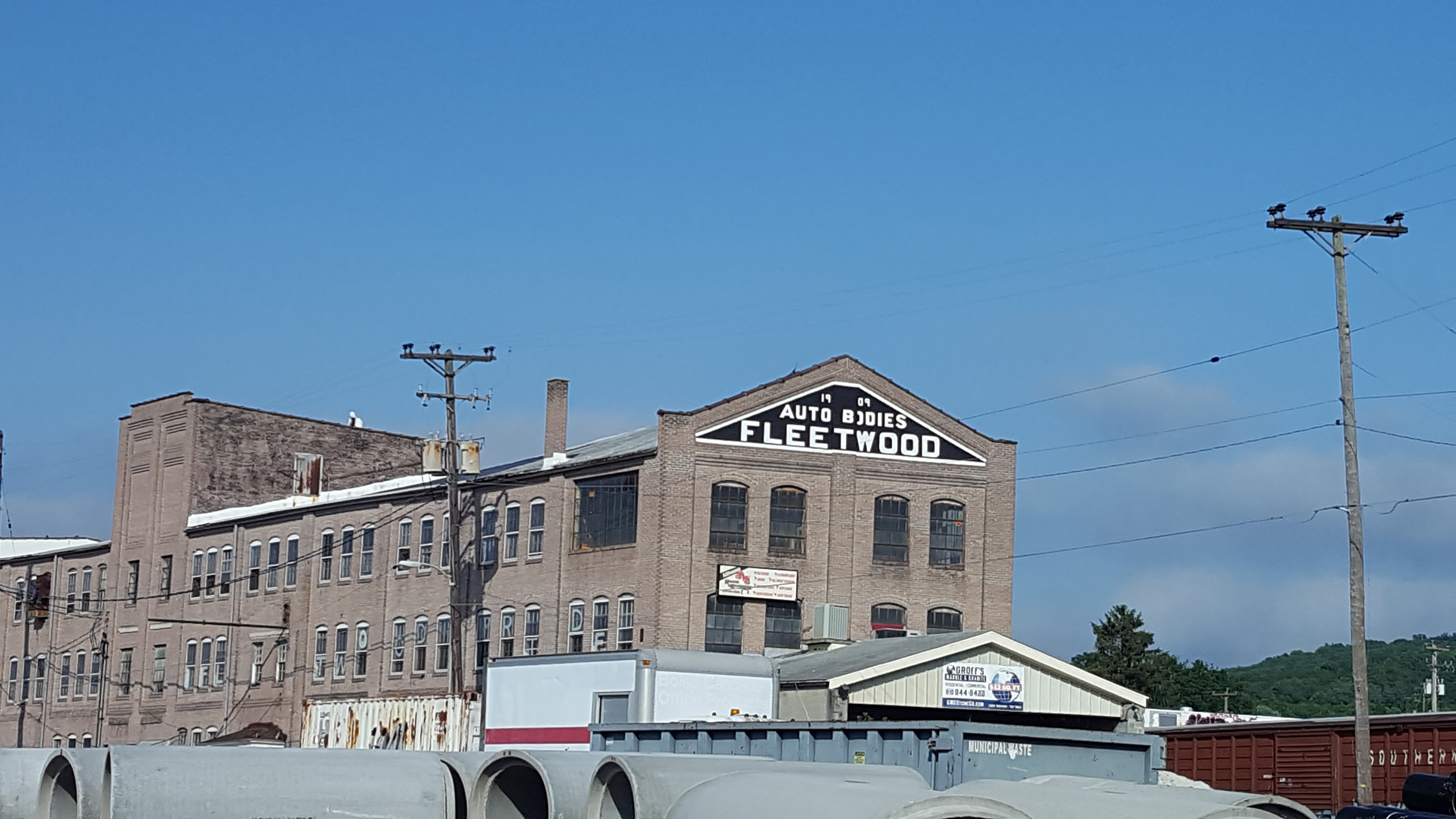
Fleetwood, Pennsylvania 2016

Fleetwood Metal Body was an automobile coachbuilder formed on April 1, 1909. The company name was derived from Fleetwood, Pennsylvania, home of the company at the start, and lived on for decades in the form of the Cadillac Fleetwood and various Fleetwood trim lines on Cadillac cars. As of 2022, the remaining original buildings of Fleetwood Metal Body are undergoing restoration and renovation into loft-style apartments.

== Fleetwood ==
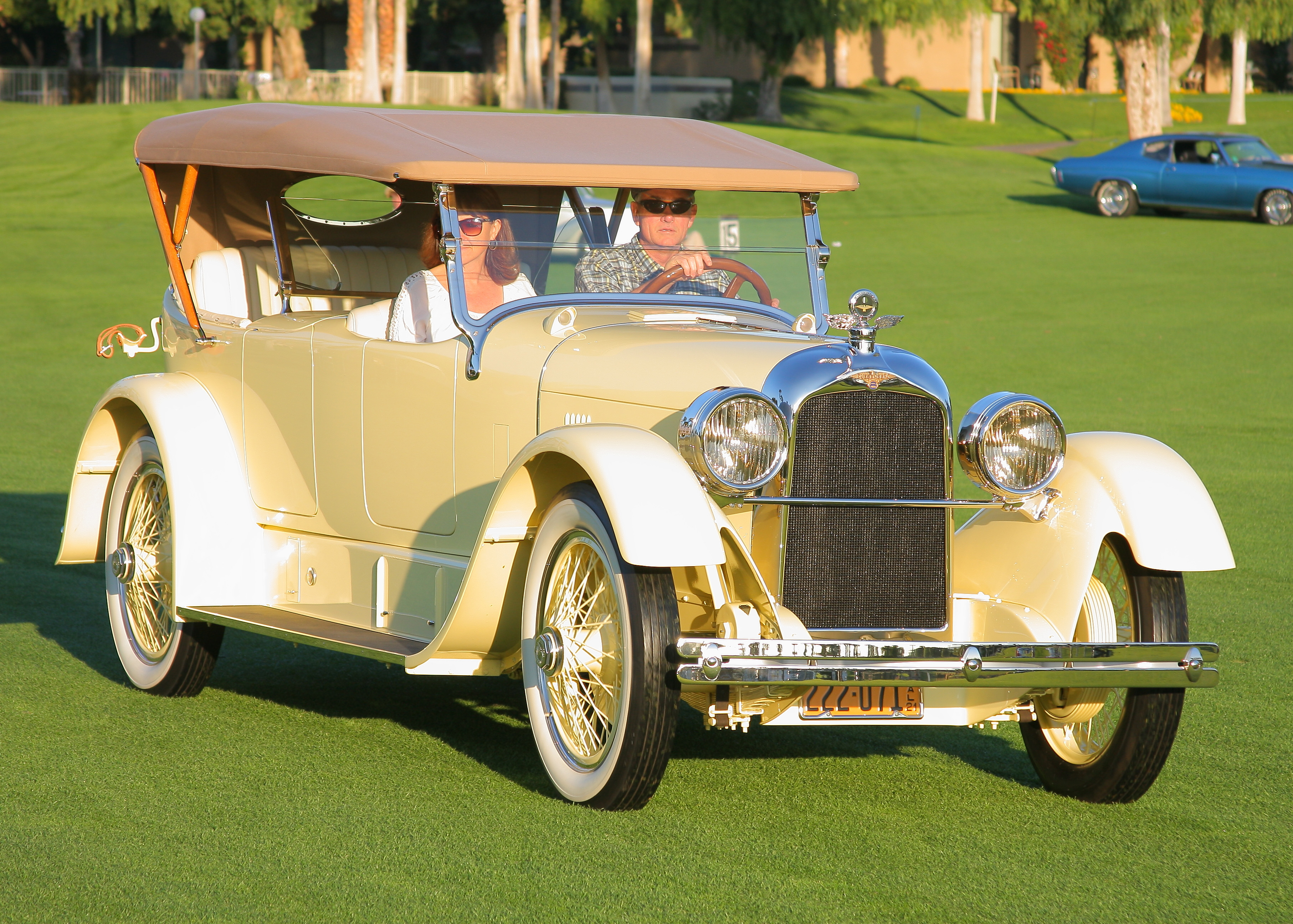
1922 Duesenberg Model A phaeton by Fleetwood

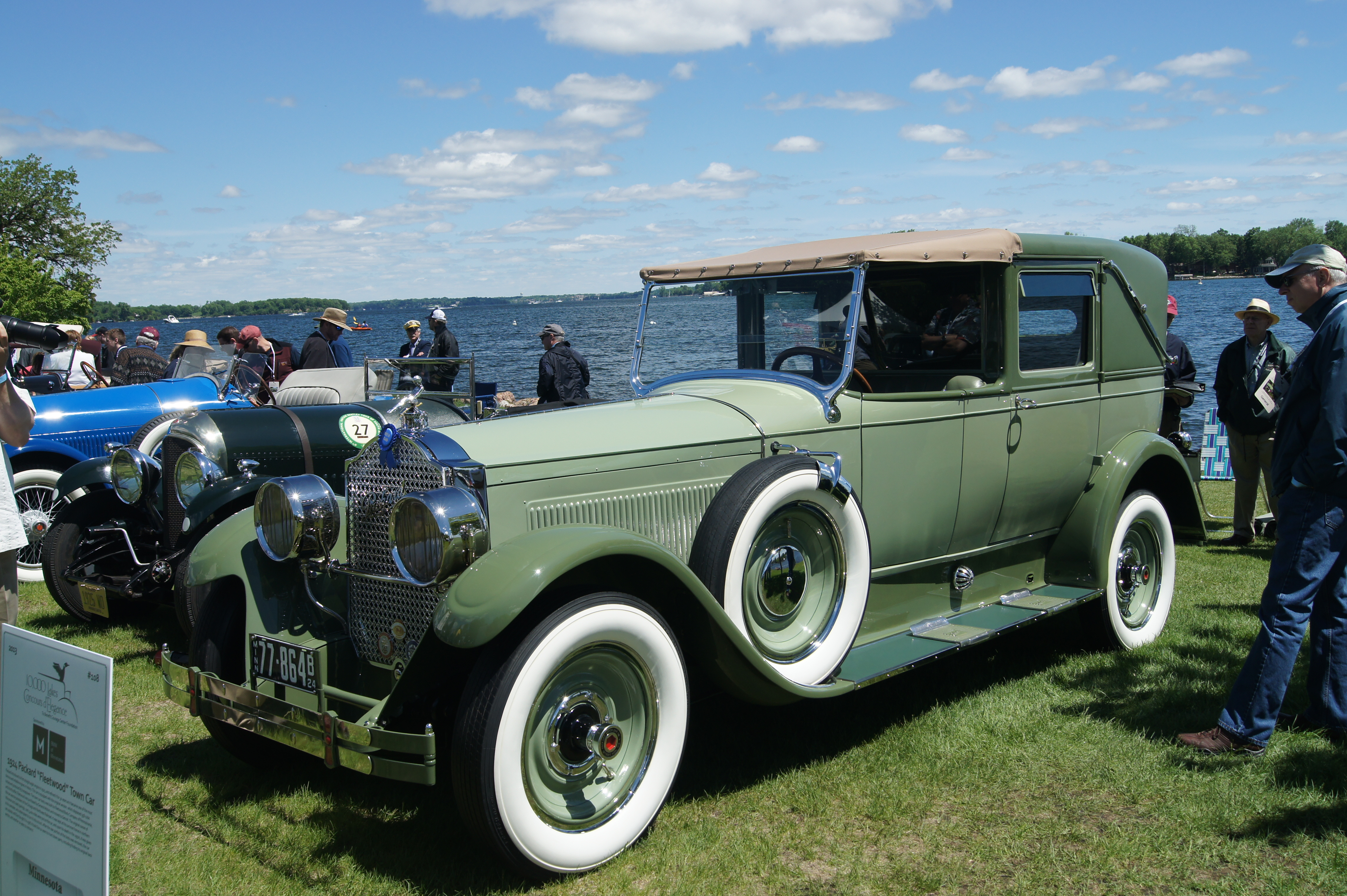
1924 Packard Town Car by Fleetwood

The Fleetwood, Pennsylvania facility is located at 69 South Franklin Street. The business was relocated to Detroit in 1931 but the structure remains.

It was a top-tier producer of coachbuilt metal and wood automobile bodies. Fleetwood bodies graced cars owned by royalty of India and Japan, American presidents, and screen stars like Rudolph Valentino. Fleetwood produced bespoke bodies on chassis from Bentley, Cadillac, Daniels, Duesenberg, Fiat, Isotta Fraschini, Lincoln, Mercedes-Benz, Packard, Pierce-Arrow, Rolls-Royce, SGV, and Stutz.

Bodies were manufactured according to the customer's specifications, then sent by rail to the rolling chassis manufacturer where assembly was completed. Most of the bodywork crafted in Pennsylvania was used by Packard, with the rest of production being split between Cadillac and Lincoln.

== Purchase by Fisher ==
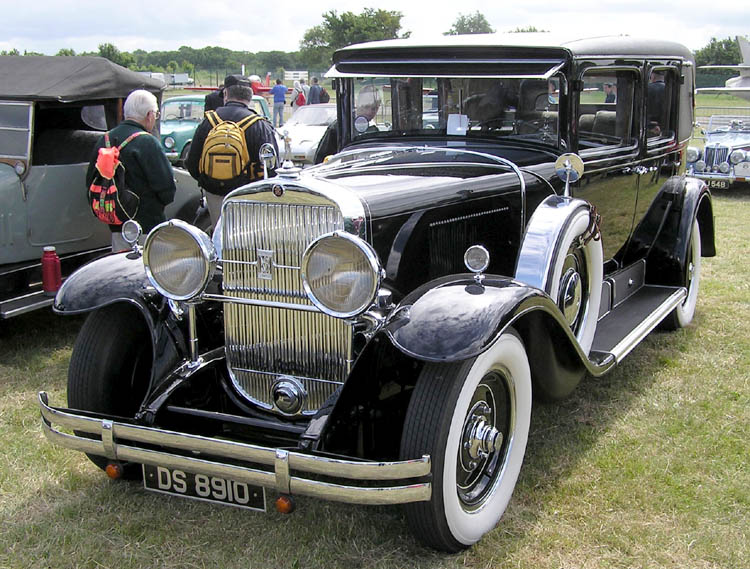
1929 Cadillac V-8 series 341-B Imperial sedan or limousine, body by Fleetwood

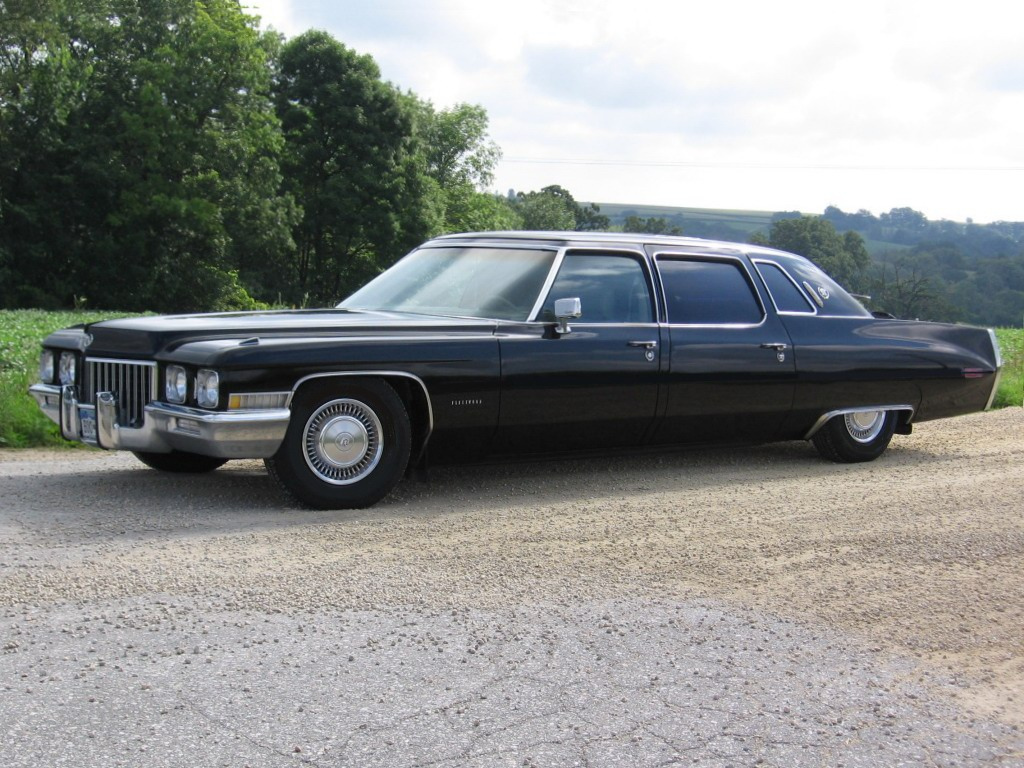
1971 Cadillac Fleetwood Series 75

Fleetwood was purchased by Fisher Body in 1925, and became an OEM provider of bodies for Detroit Assembly on Clark Street, and integrated into General Motors in 1931. The factory was located at the southwest corner of Fort Street and West End Street in the Detroit neighborhood of Delray, approximately 2 miles east of the Ford River Rouge Complex. The Fisher Freeway was named for the original factory location, which later became known as Fisher Plant #18. The location was closed in 1987 when manufacturing was transferred to the Detroit/Hamtramck Assembly factory, and the site was redeveloped as the Container Port Group Detroit facility.

== As a coachbuilder for Cadillac ==
Similar to LeBaron, Fleetwood continued to build bespoke bodies for several years, mainly for Cadillac. In the early 1930s Fleetwood-bodied Cadillacs often wore a trim piece denoting a sweep panel across cowl and hood. After 1934 and before Fleetwood was made a model name of Cadillac, it was responsible for elaborate detailing on expensive Cadillacs with standard bodies. Some Cadillacs up until the 1970's had an Interior by Fleetwood, Body by Fisher tag on some door sill plates.

== See also ==
- Cadillac Fleetwood
