= Chevrolet Vega =

Subcompact automobile

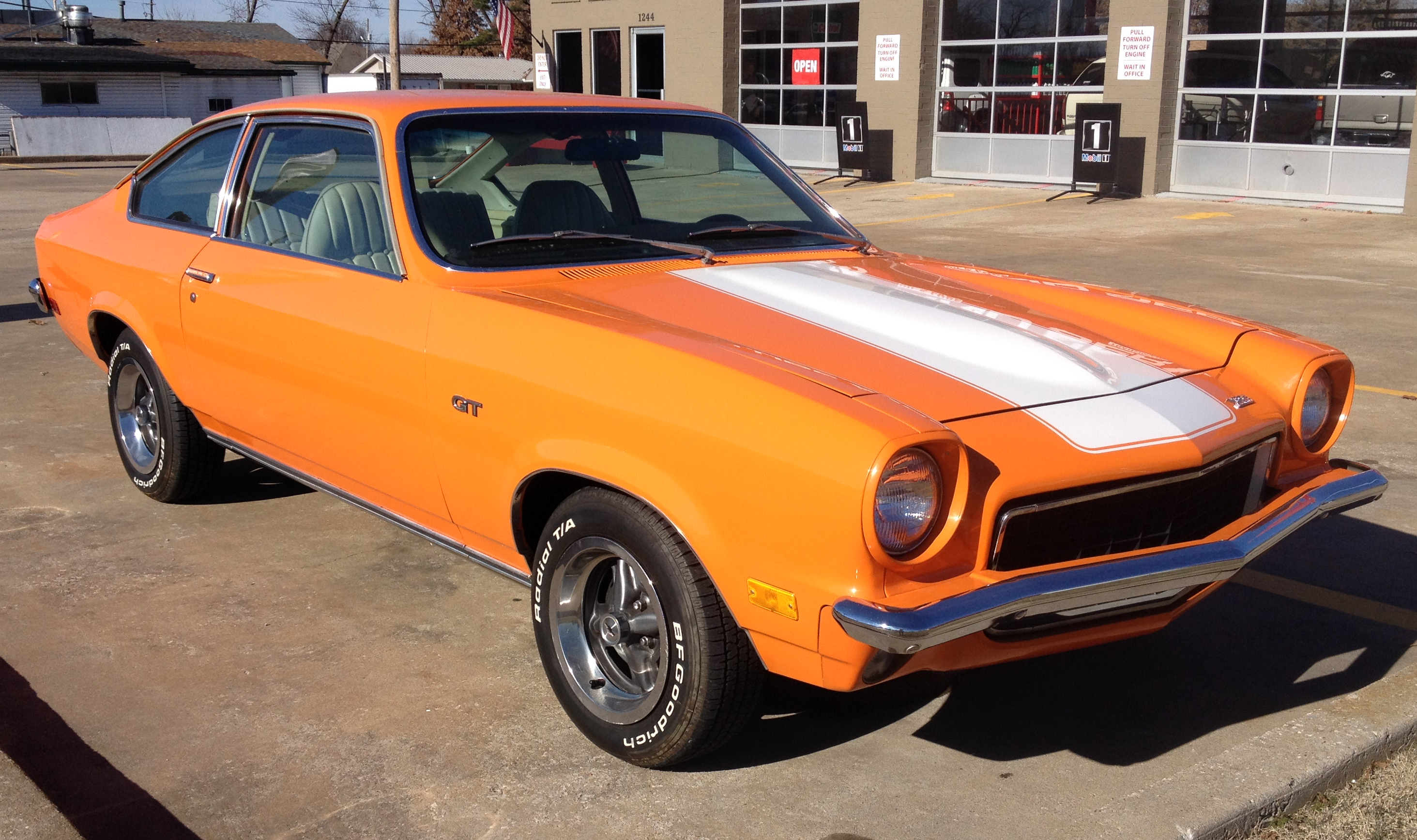
- 1971 Chevrolet Vega

Overview
- Manufacturer: Chevrolet (General Motors)
- Also called: Vega 2300
- Production: 1970–1977
- Model years: 1971–1977
- Assembly: United States: Lordstown, Ohio (Lordstown Assembly); South Gate, California (South Gate Assembly); Canada: Quebec (Sainte-Thérèse Assembly)
- Designer: GM & Chevrolet design staffs chief stylist, Bill Mitchell

Body and chassis
- Class: Subcompact
- Body style: 2-door notchback sedan; 2-door hatchback; 2-door station wagon; 2-door panel delivery
- Layout: FR layout
- Platform: H platform
- Related: Pontiac Astre; Chevrolet Monza; Pontiac Sunbird; Buick Skyhawk; Oldsmobile Starfire

Powertrain
- Engine: 2.3 L (140 cu in) 2300 L13 I4; 2.3 L (140 cu in) 2300 L11 I4; 2.0 L (122 cu in) RPO Z09 I4 (Cosworth)
- Transmission: 3-speed manual; 4-speed manual; 5-speed manual w/overdrive; Torque-Drive 2-speed Powerglide requiring manual shifting; 2-speed Powerglide automatic; 3-speed Turbo-Hydramatic automatic

Dimensions
- Wheelbase: 97.0 in (2,464 mm)
- Length: 169.7 in (4,310 mm)
- Width: 65.4 in (1,661 mm)
- Height: 51 in (1,295 mm)
- Curb weight: 2,181–2,270 lb (989–1,030 kg) (1971)

Chronology
- Predecessor: Chevrolet Corvair
- Successor: Chevrolet Monza

The Chevrolet Vega is a subcompact automobile manufactured and marketed by GM's Chevrolet division from 1970 until 1977. Available in two-door hatchback, notchback, wagon, and sedan delivery body styles, all standard models were powered by a 2.3 L (140 cu in) inline four-cylinder Chevrolet 2300 engine designed specifically for the Vega, with a lightweight aluminum alloy cylinder block. The Vega first went on sale in Chevrolet dealerships on September 10, 1970. Variants included the 2.0 L (120 cu in) Cosworth Vega, a short-lived limited-production performance version introduced spring 1975.

The Vega received the 1971 Motor Trend Car of the Year. Subsequently, the car became widely known for a range of problems related to its engineering, reliability, safety, propensity to rust, and engine durability. Despite numerous recalls and design upgrades, Vega's problems tarnished its reputation and that of General Motors. Production ended with the 1977 model year.

The car was named for Vega, the brightest star in the constellation Lyra.

== History ==
Chevrolet and Pontiac divisions worked separately on small cars in the early and mid 1960s. Ed Cole, GM's executive vice-president of operating staff, working on his small-car project with corporate engineering and design staff, presented the program to GM's president in 1967. GM management chose Cole's version over proposals from Chevrolet and Pontiac, and gave the car to Chevrolet to sell. Corporate executives decided to enter the small car market and develop the vehicle.

In 1968, GM chairman James Roche announced GM would produce the new car in the U.S. in two years. Ed Cole was chief engineer and Bill Mitchell, vice-president of design staff, was the chief stylist. Cole wanted a world-beater in showrooms in 24 months. Roche noted that GM had a team of "stylists, researchers and engineers" who had worked on the vehicle code-named XP-877 for years. John DeLorean later challenged this notion and stated that no prototypes or test properties had been built before Roche's announcement. Blueprints apparently did exist; however, they were an amalgam of competitive subcompact vehicles from overseas, including some that GM overseas operations produced.

A GM design team was set up, headed by James G. Musser Jr., who had helped develop the Chevy II, the Camaro, the Chevrolet small-block V8 engines, and the Turbo-Hydramatic transmission. Musser said, "This was the first vehicle where one person was in charge", and that his team "did the entire vehicle".

=== Development: 1968–1970 ===
Development for the new car began in 1968 to be powered by a new all-aluminum die-cast engine block technology. The first sand-cast aluminum blocks had preceded the decision to build the car by two years. It was a relatively large displacement engine with good low-speed torque, with gear ratios for low engine rpm to achieve fuel economy. Engine testing totaled 6,000,000 miles. A pre-test engine was installed in a Fiat 124 sedan for development of the aluminum block, while several 1968 Opel sedans were used for drivetrain development

Chevrolet instituted a new management program, the car line management technique, to produce the all-new car in two years. The chief vehicle engineer had overall charge of the program. Fifty engineers, dedicated to the design of the entire car, were divided into groups: body, power train, chassis design, product assurance, and pleasability. The latter would check continuously on the vehicles on the assembly line, with computers in another program monitoring the quality control of every vehicle built. Fisher Body engineers and draftsmen moved in with the Vega personnel.

In October 1968, there was one body style (the "11" style notchback sedan), one engine, one transmission (MB1 Torque-Drive manually shifted two-speed automatic), one base trim level, a bench seat, molded rubber floor covering, no glove box or headliner and no air-conditioning (ventilation was through the upper dash from the wiper plenum). As the market changed, so did the car in development.

In December 1968, hatchback, wagon, and panel delivery styles were added; also floor-level ventilation, and an optional performance engine ("L11" two-barrel) which, predicted as 20% of production, accounted for 75%. Bucket seats were standard. Hatchback and wagon received carpeting and headliners. Optional air conditioning, predicted as 10% of production, was actually selected 45% of the time.

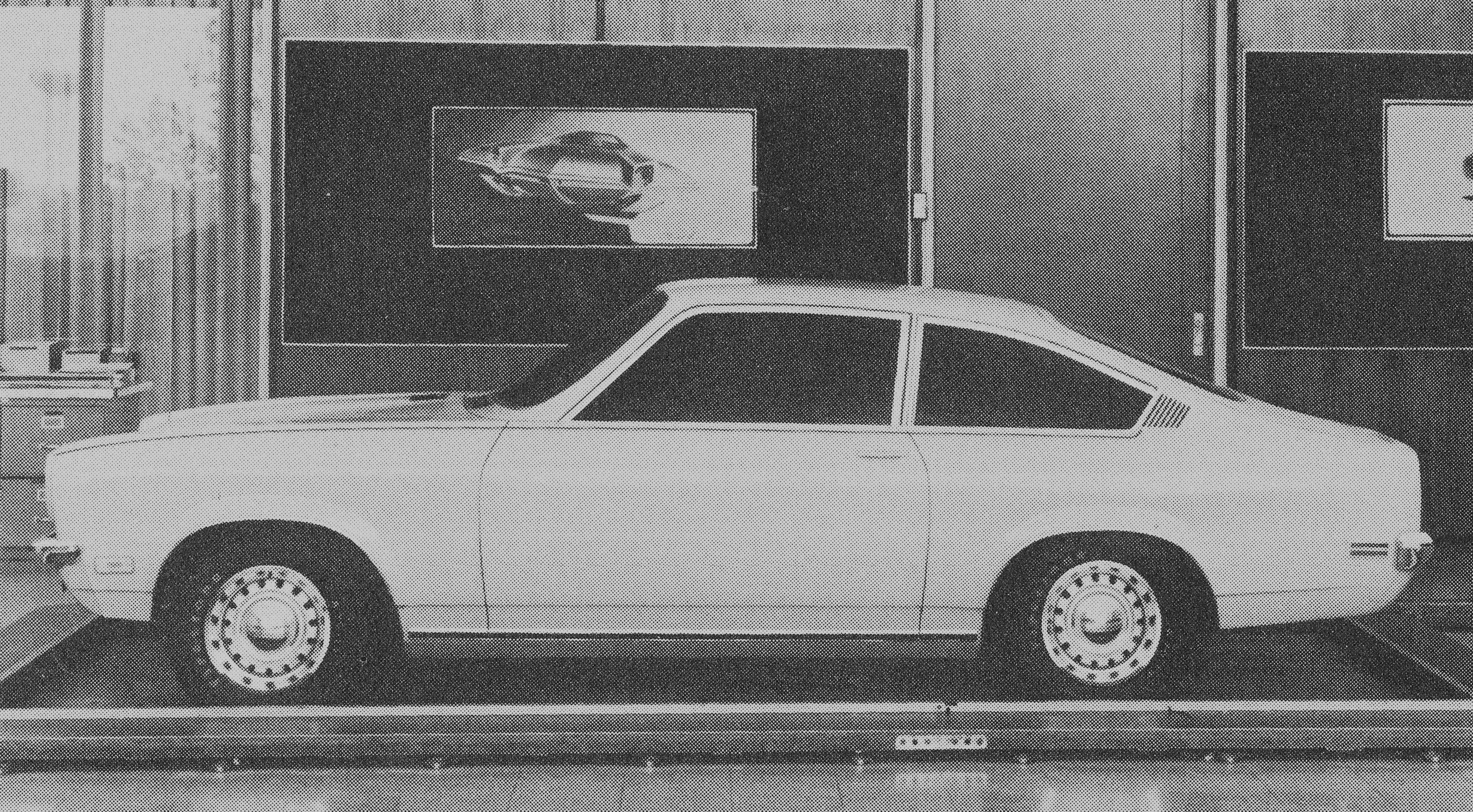
XP-887 Hatchback clay model Chevrolet studio final design, 1969

In February 1969, Opel three- and four-speed transmissions (three-speed standard, others optional); Powerglide were added (now four transmissions); mechanical fuel pump replaced by in-tank electric pump (making this the first GM product with an in tank fuel pump prior to the adoption of fuel injection); power steering option; base "11" style notchback trim upgraded to match hatchback and wagon carpet and headliner.

In April 1969, the car gained gauge-pack cluster, HD suspension, wider tires; adjustable seat back (45% of production); bumpers restyled, lower valance panels added; swing-out quarter window option (10% of production).

In July 1969, an electrically heated rear window option (10% of production); "GT" package, $325.00 extra (35% of production); bright window-frame and roof drip moldings added to hatchback and wagon.

This is essentially how the car launched as a 1971 model. Production began on June 26, 1970. After the national GM strike (September to November 1970), bright roof drip moldings were added to the base "11" notchback, with moldings sent to dealers to update units already in the field.

Cars magazine said in 1974 that in the rush to introduce the car with other 1971 models, "[t]ests which should have been at the proving grounds were performed by customers, necessitating numerous piecemeal 'fixes' by dealers. Chevrolet's 'bright star' received an enduring black eye despite a continuing development program which eventually alleviated most of these initial shortcomings."

== Design and engineering ==
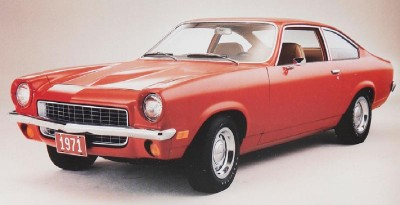
1971 Vega hatchback coupe

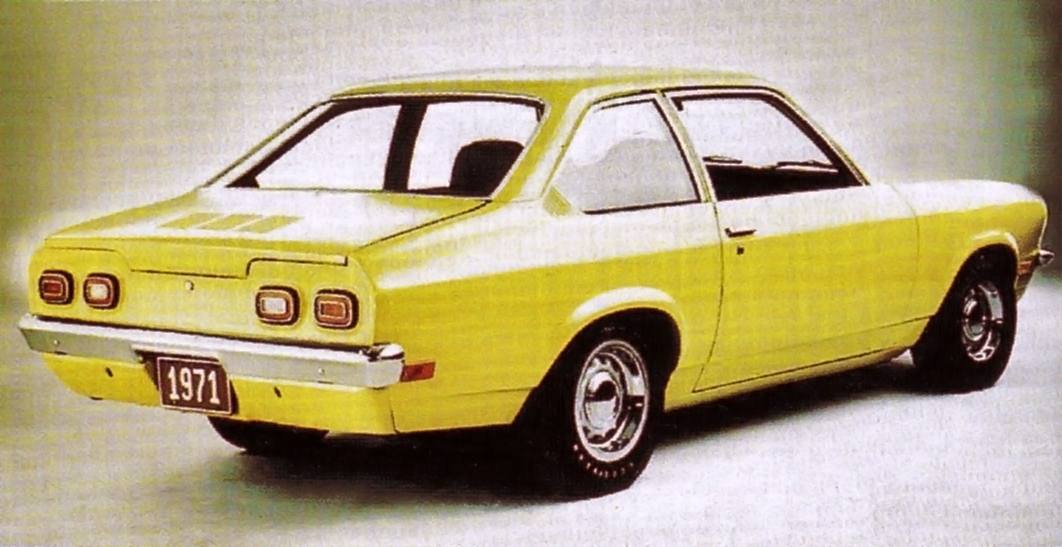
1971 Vega sedan (notchback)

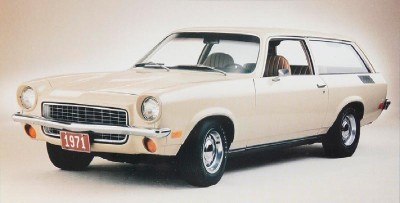
1971 Vega Kammback wagon

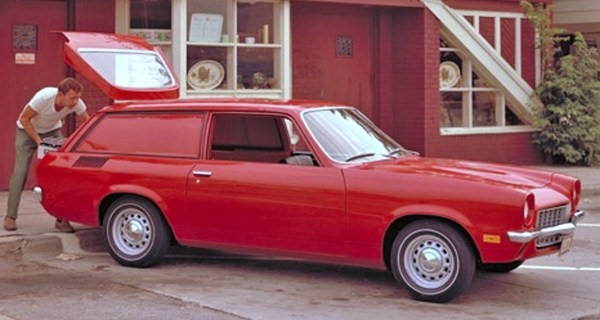
1971 Vega panel express

The wheelbase on all models is 97.0 inches (2,460 mm). Width is 65.4 inches (1,660 mm). The 1971 and 1972 models are 169.7 inches (4,310 mm) long. The 1973 models are 3 inches (76 mm) longer due to the front 5 mph bumper. Front and rear 5 mph bumpers on 1974 to 1977 models add another 5.7 inches (140 mm).

The hatchback, with its lower roofline and a fold-down rear seat, accounted for nearly half of all Vegas sold.

The sedan, later named "Notchback", is the only model with an enclosed trunk, and had the lowest base price. The Kammback wagon has a lower cargo liftover height and a swing-up liftgate.

The panel express had steel panels in place of the wagon's rear side glass, an enclosed storage area under the load floor, and a low-back driver's seat. An auxiliary passenger seat was optional. The model's classification as a truck, with less stringent safety requirements, allowed the low back seat(s).

The aluminum-block, inline-four engine was a joint effort by General Motors, Reynolds Metals, and Sealed Power Corp. The engine and its die-cast block technology were developed by GM engineering staff, then passed to Chevrolet for finalization and production. Ed Cole, involved with the 1955 small-block V8 as chief engineer at Chevrolet and now equally involved with the Vega engine as GM president, often visited the engineering staff engine drafting room on Saturdays, reviewing the design and directing changes, to the consternation of Chevrolet engineers and manufacturing personnel, who knew he wanted a rush job. Cole insisted that the engine didn't require a radiator - the heat rejection from the heater core would be sufficient. After many prototype failures, a (small) radiator was added to the vehicle. The engine in development became known in-house as "the world's tallest, smallest engine" due to the tall cylinder head. Its vibration, noise, and tendency to overheat were rectified by 1974.

The Vega's suspension, live rear axle, 53.2% front/46.8% rear weight distribution, low center of mass and neutral steering gave good handling. Lateral acceleration capacities were 0.90 g (standard suspension) and 0.93 g (RPO F-41 suspension). Steering box and linkage were ahead of the front wheel centerline, with a cushioned two-piece shaft. Front suspension was by short and long arms, with lower control arm bushings larger than on the 1970 Camaro. Four-link rear suspension copies the 1970 Chevelle. The design features coil springs front and rear.

The chassis development engineers aimed for full-size American car ride qualities with European handling. Later torque-arm rear suspension eliminated rear wheel hop under panic braking. Brakes (front discs, rear drums) copy an Opel design, with 10-inch (250 mm) diameter single-piston solid rotors, 9-inch (230 mm) drums and 70/30 front/rear braking distribution.

All models shared the same hood, fenders, floor pan, lower door panels, rocker panels, engine compartment and front end. In mid-1971, Chevrolet introduced an optional GT package for hatchback and Kammback models, which included the RPO L11 two-barrel 140 engine, F41 handling option, special tires, and trim.

== Model year changes ==
For 1972, models had a revised exhaust system and driveline to reduce vibration and noise; also revised shock absorbers. Turbo Hydra-Matic three-speed automatic transmission and custom cloth interior were optional and a glove box was added.

For 1973, 300 changes included new exterior and interior colors and new standard interior trim. Front and rear nameplate scripts "Chevrolet Vega 2300" were changed to "Vega by Chevrolet". To meet the 1973 5 mph front bumper standards the front bumper, on stronger brackets, was extended 3 inches (76 mm), with a steel body-color filler panel. US-built Saginaw manual transmissions and a new shift linkage replaced the Opel units. The RPO L11 engine had a new Holley 5210C progressive two-barrel carburetor. New options included BR70-13 white-stripe steel-belted radial tires, full wheel covers, and body side molding with black rubber insert. Two new models were introduced mid-year: the estate wagon with simulated wood grain side and rear accents, and the LX notchback with vinyl roof finish. On May 17, 1973, the millionth Vega left the Lordstown Assembly plant – an orange GT hatchback with white sport stripes, power steering, and neutral custom vinyl interior including exclusive vinyl door panels. A limited-edition "Millionth Vega" was introduced replicating the milestone car, with orange carpeting and Millionth Vega door handle accents. Sixty-five hundred were built from May 1 to July 1. For the first time, cloth upholstery was offered, with the Custom interior in black or blue.

For 1974, the major exterior changes were a revised front end and 5 mph rear bumper, increasing overall length 6 inches (150 mm), and a slanted front header panel with recessed headlamp bezels. Louvered steel replaced the egg-crate plastic grille. Front and rear aluminum bumpers with inner steel spring replaced the chrome bumpers, with license plate mountings relocated. A revised rear panel on notchback and hatchback models had larger single-unit taillights, with ventilation grilles eliminated from trunk and hatch lids (rear quarter panels on the wagon models). A 16-US-gallon (61 L; 13 imp gal) fuel tank replaced the 11-US-gallon (42 L; 9.2 imp gal) tank. Side striping replaced the hood and deck stripes for the GT sport stripes option. The custom interior's wood-trimmed molded door panels were replaced by vinyl door panels matching the seat trim. January saw plastic front fender liners added after thousands of the fenders were replaced under warranty on 1971–1974 models. In February, the "Spirit of America" limited-edition hatchback was introduced, with a white exterior, white vinyl roof, blue and red striping on body sides, hood and rear-end panel, emblems on front fenders and rear panel, white "GT" wheels, A70-13 raised white-letter tires, white custom vinyl interior, and red accent color carpeting. Seventy-five hundred Vegas were built through May. Sales peaked at 460,374 for the 1974 model year.

The 264 changes for 1975 included H.E.I. (high-energy) electronic ignition and a catalytic converter. New options included power brakes, tilt steering wheel, BR78-13B steel-belted radial tires, and special custom cloth interior for the hatchback and Kammback. In March the Cosworth Vega was introduced with an all-aluminum engine and electronic fuel injection, the first on a Chevrolet passenger car. The panel express version was discontinued at the end of the 1975 model year. Its sales peaked at 7,800 in its first year, then averaged 4,000 per year. Over 1,500 1975 models were sold. Total sales fell to 206,239.

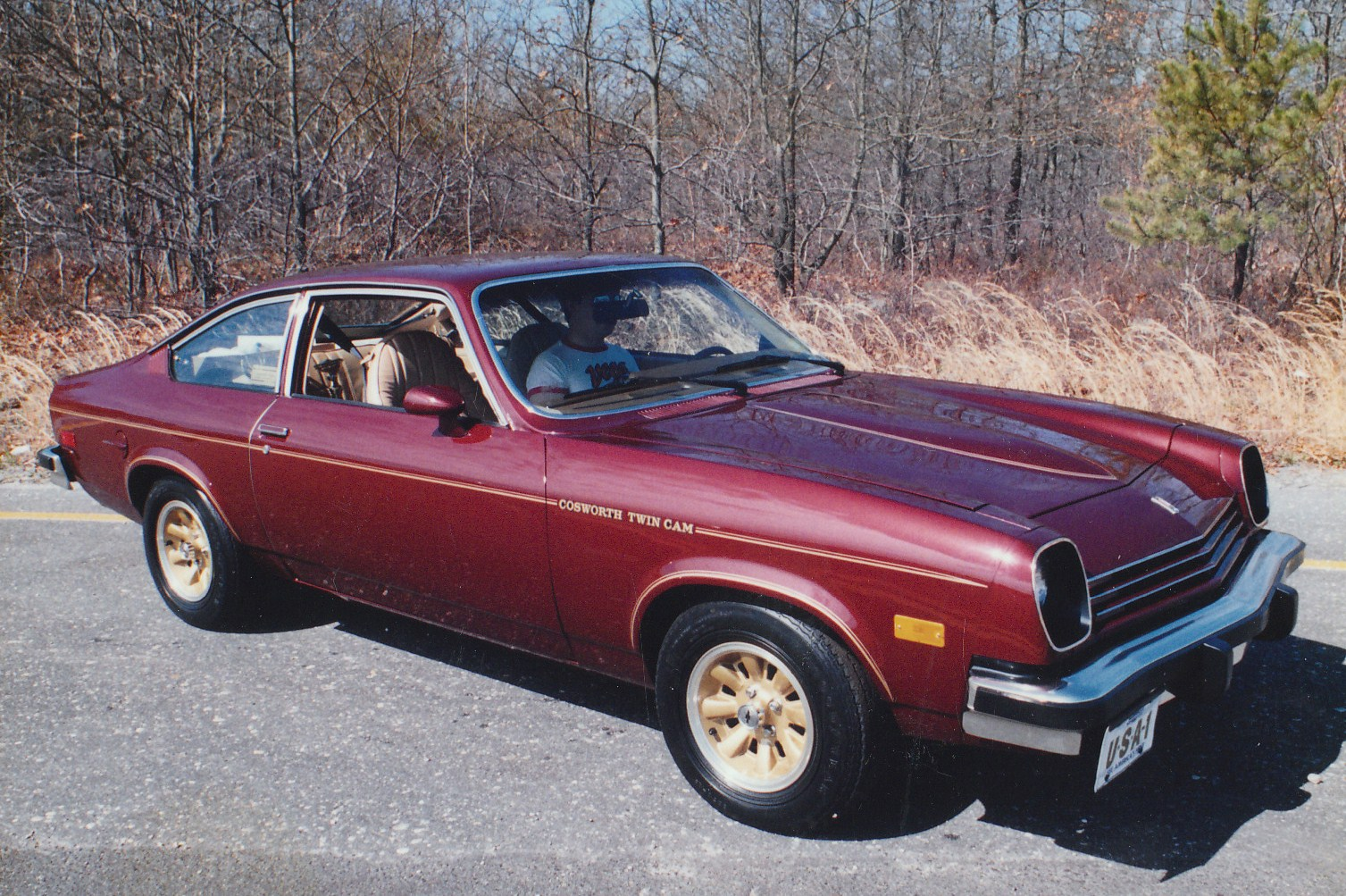
1976 Cosworth Vega hatchback coupe

For 1976, Chevrolet claimed 300 changes were made. A facelift included a revised header panel with Chevy bowtie emblem, wider grille, revised headlamp bezels – all in corrosion-resistant material – and new tri-color taillights for the notchback and hatchback (although the amber turn signals were nonfunctional). The cooling and durability of the Dura-Built 140 2.3 L engine were improved. The chassis received the Monza's upgraded components including box-section front cross-member, larger front and rear brakes (with the fronts gaining vented rotors), and torque-arm rear suspension. Extensive anti-rust improvements to the body included galvanized fenders and rocker panels. New models were introduced: GT estate wagon, Cabriolet notchback (with a half-vinyl roof and opera windows similar to the Monza Towne coupe), and a limited-edition Nomad wagon with restyled side windows.

New options included BorgWarner five-speed manual overdrive transmission and houndstooth seat trim named "sport cloth" at an additional $18. A "Sky-Roof" with tinted reflecting sliding glass and an eight-track tape player were options from January. The Cosworth was canceled in July after 1,446 1976 models were built.

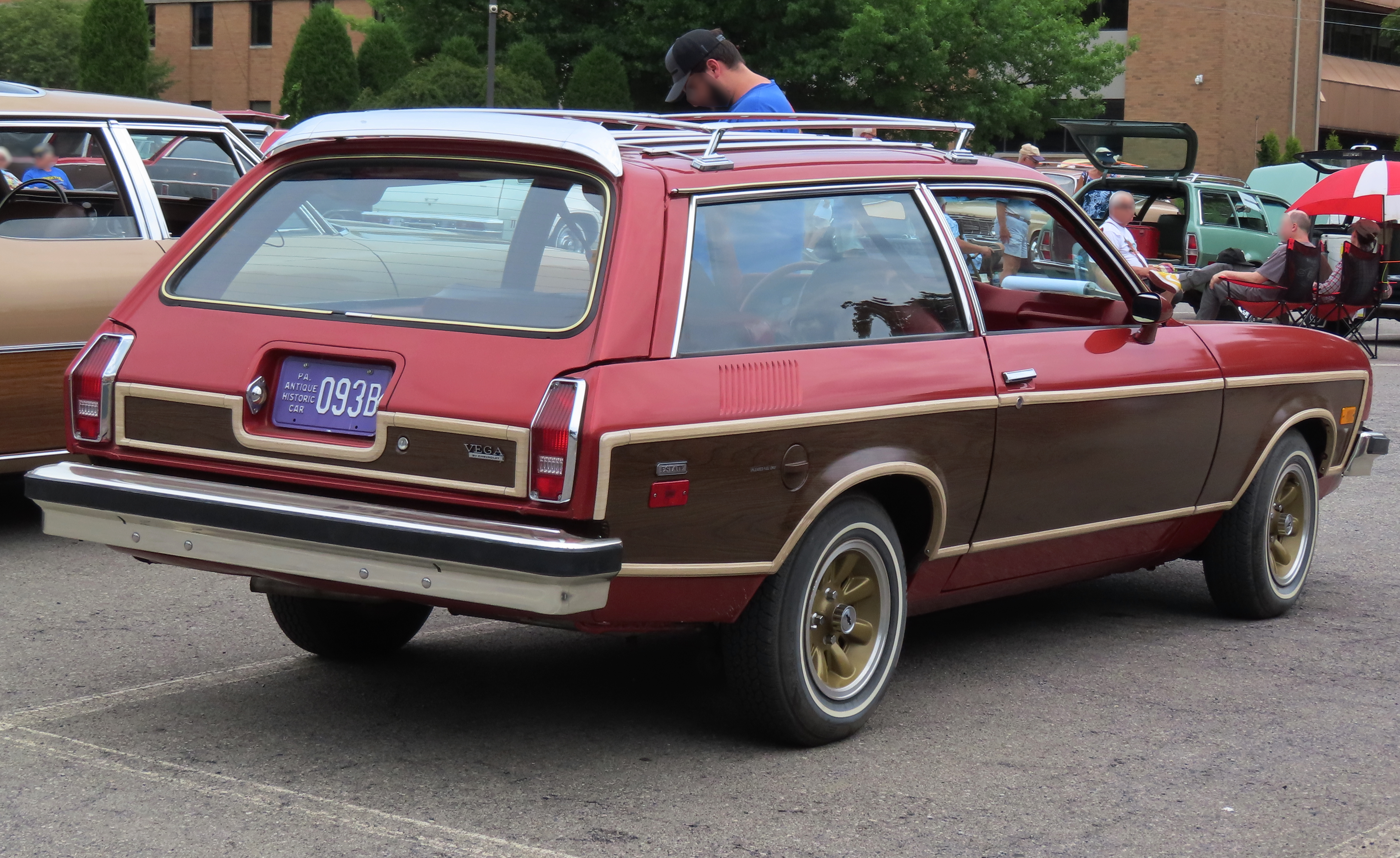
1977 Chevrolet Vega Estate wagon (nonstandard wheels)

For 1977, models had few revisions. The notchback was renamed "coupe". On the Dura-Built 140 engine, a pulse-air system met stricter Federal emission standards. The single-barrel engine and three-speed manual transmission were dropped. Interiors received a color-keyed steering column, steering wheel, instrument-cluster face, and parking-brake cover, with a color-keyed full console a new option. The GT models received black, exterior moldings (lower moldings deleted), black, sport mirrors and wheels, Vega GT bodyside and rear striping as well as a Vega GT ID

== Engine ==
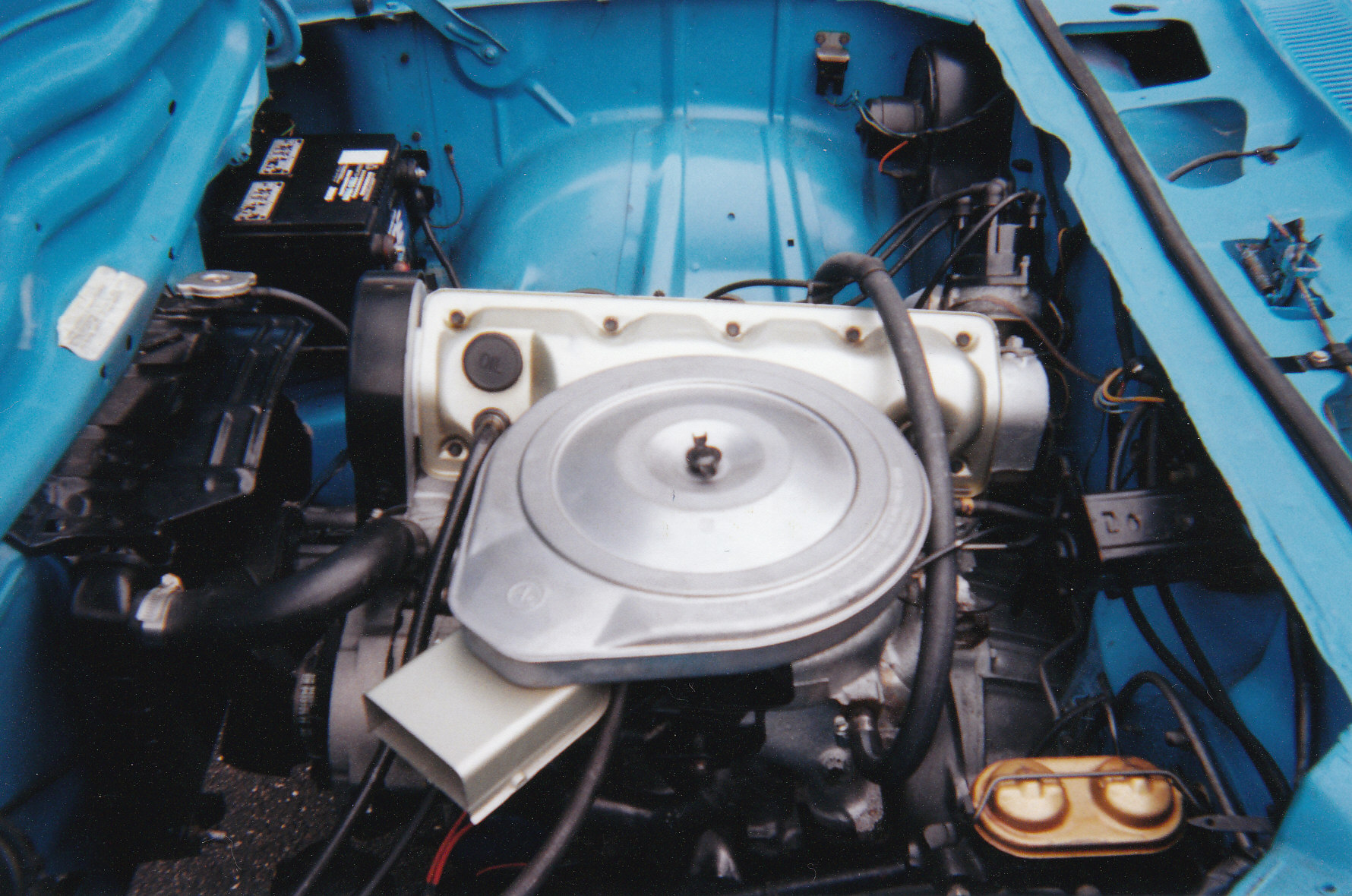
140 cu in (2.3 L) 1 bbl. I-4, 90 hp (1971)

The Vega engine is a 2,287 cc (2.3 L; 139.6 cu in) inline-four with a die-cast aluminum alloy cylinder block, cast-iron cylinder head and single overhead camshaft (SOHC). The block is an open-deck design with siamesed cylinder bores. The outer case walls form the water jacket, sealed off by the head and head gasket, and the block has cast-iron main bearing caps and crankshaft. The cast-iron cylinder head was chosen for low cost. A simple overhead valvetrain has three components activating each valve instead of a typical pushrod system's seven. An external belt from the crankshaft drives the five-bearing camshaft plus the water pump and fan.

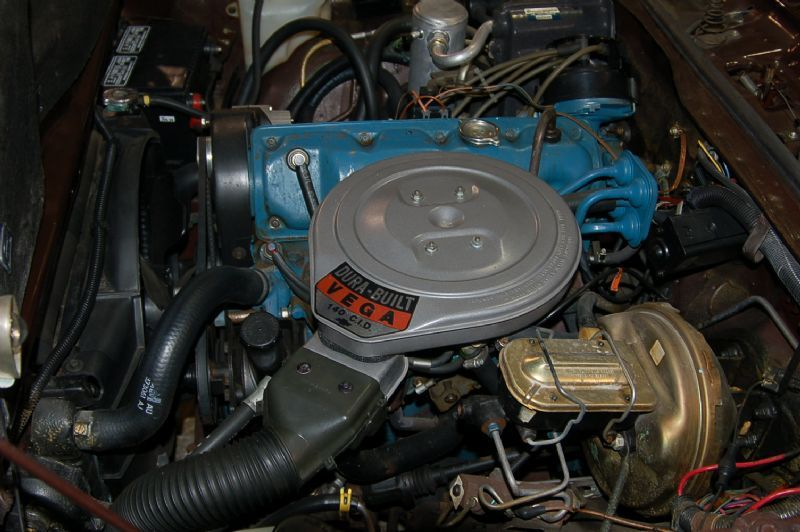
Dura-Built 140 cu in (2.3 L) 2bbl. I-4, 84 hp (1977)

Compression ratio for the standard and optional engine is 8.0:1, as the engine was designed for low-lead and lead-free fuels. The single-barrel carburetor version produces 90 hp (67 kW); the two-barrel version (RPO L11) produces 110 hp (82 kW). From 1972, ratings were listed as SAE net. The engine is prone to vibration, which is damped by large rubber engine mounts. The 1972 Rochester DualJet two-barrel carburetor required an air pump for emission certification and was replaced in 1973 with a Holley-built 5210C progressive two-barrel carburetor. The 1973 emission control revisions reduced power from the optional engine by 5 bhp (3.7 kW), and its noise levels were lowered. A high energy ignition was introduced on 1975 engines.

Serious problems with the engine led to a redesign for 1976–1977. Marketed as the Dura-Built 140, the new engine had improved coolant pathways, redesigned cylinder head with quieter hydraulic valve lifters, longer-life valve stem seals that reduced oil consumption by 50%, and redesigned water pump, head gasket, and thermostat. Warranty was upgraded to five years or 60,000 miles (97,000 km). In 1977 a pulse-air system was added to meet stricter 1977 U.S. exhaust emission regulations and the engine paint color (used on all Chevrolet engines) changed from orange to blue.

In August 1975, Chevrolet conducted an endurance test of three Vegas powered by Dura-Built 140 engines, advertised as a "60,000 miles in 60 days Durability Run". Supervised by the United States Auto Club, three pre-production 1976 hatchback coupes with manual transmissions and air conditioning were driven non-stop for 60,000 miles (97,000 km) in 60 days through the deserts of California and Nevada by nine drivers, covering a total of 180,000 miles (290,000 km). With the sole failure a broken timing belt, Vega project engineer Bernie Ernest said GM felt "very comfortable with the warranty."

In ambient temperatures between 99 °F (37 °C) and 122 °F (50 °C) the cars lost 24 US fluid ounces (0.71 L) of coolant (normal evaporation under the conditions) during the 180,000 miles. They averaged 28.9 mpg_{‑US} (8.1 L/100 km; 34.7 mpg_{‑imp}) and used one quart of oil per 3,400 miles. Driving expenses averaged 2.17 cents per mile. One of the cars went on display at the 1976 New York Auto Show. The 1976 Vega was marketed as a durable and reliable car.

=== Engine output summary ===
Year	Base L13 engine	Optional L11 engine	Cosworth twin-cam (RPO Z09)
1971	90 hp (67 kW) at 4,400 rpm 136 lb⋅ft (184 N⋅m) at 2,400 rpm	110 hp (82 kW) at 4,800 rpm 138 lb⋅ft (187 N⋅m) at 3,200 rpm	
1972	80 hp (60 kW) at 4,400 rpm 121 lb⋅ft (164 N⋅m) at 2,400 rpm	90 hp (67 kW) at 4,800 rpm 121 lb⋅ft (164 N⋅m) at 2,800 rpm	
1973	72 hp (54 kW) at 4,400 rpm 100 lb⋅ft (136 N⋅m) at 2,000 rpm	85 hp (63 kW) at 4,800 rpm 115 lb⋅ft (156 N⋅m) at 2,400 rpm	
1974	75 hp (56 kW) at 4,400 rpm 115 lb⋅ft (156 N⋅m) at 2,400 rpm	85 hp (63 kW) at 4,400 rpm 122 lb⋅ft (165 N⋅m) at 2,400 rpm	
1975	78 hp (58 kW) at 4,200 rpm 120 lb⋅ft (163 N⋅m) at 2,000 rpm	87 hp (65 kW) at 4,400 rpm 122 lb⋅ft (165 N⋅m) at 2,800 rpm	110 hp (82 kW) at 5,600 rpm 107 lb⋅ft (145 N⋅m) at 4,800 rpm
1976	70 hp (52 kW) at 4,200 rpm 120 lb⋅ft (163 N⋅m) at 2,000 rpm	84 hp (63 kW) at 4,400 rpm 122 lb⋅ft (165 N⋅m) at 2,800 rpm	110 hp (82 kW) at 5,600 rpm 107 lb⋅ft (145 N⋅m) at 4,800 rpm
1977		84 hp (63 kW) at 4,400 rpm 122 lb⋅ft (165 N⋅m) at 2,800 rpm	
Notes: 1972–1977 hp/torque ratings are SAE net

== Rejected engine options ==
=== L10 engine ===
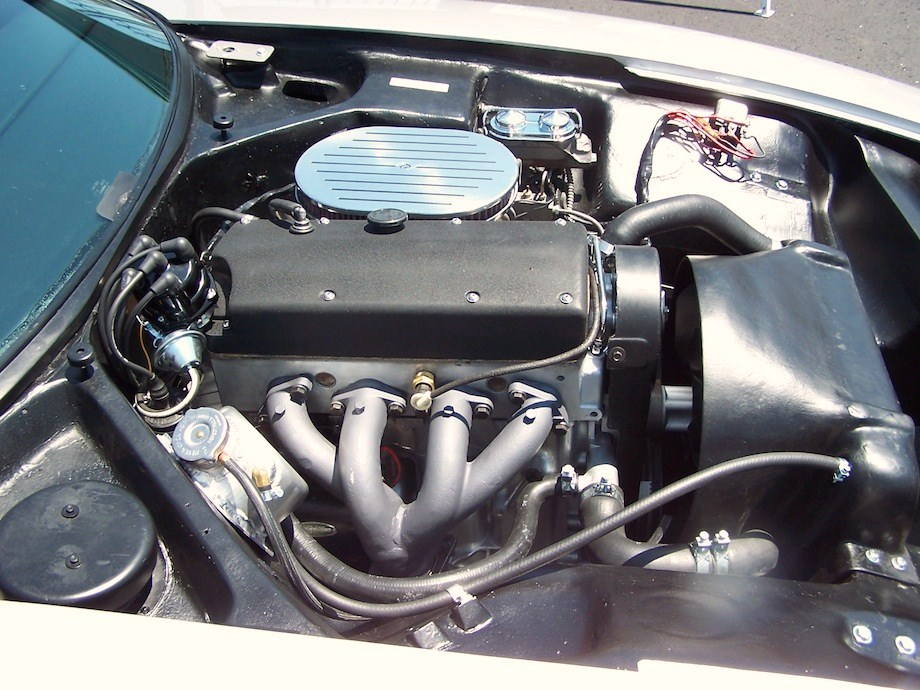
XP-898 concept prototype L10 engine

The Vega 2300 engines came with a tall iron reverse-flow cylinder head. The Chevrolet engine group later designed an aluminum crossflow cylinder head with single central overhead camshaft, "hemi" combustion chambers, and big valves to create an engine called the L10. This head was lighter and about 4 in (100 mm) lower than the Vega production piece. An L10 powered the XP-898 concept car. Although numerous prototypes were built and manufacturing tooling started, the engine did not receive production approval. It would have given higher performance than the iron-head engine, without its differential expansion head gasket problems.

=== RC2-206 Wankel ===
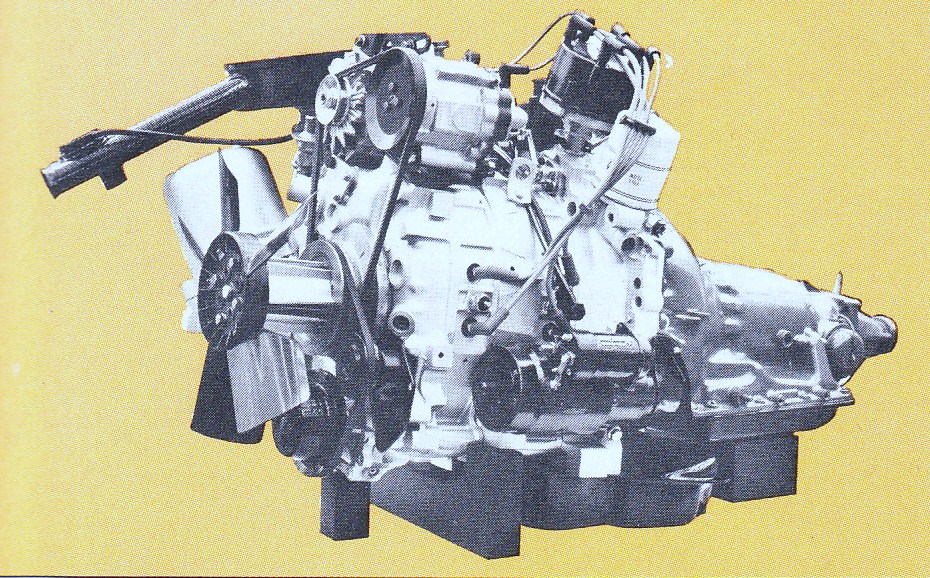
1974 Vega RC2-206 Wankel rotary engine

In November 1970, GM paid $50 million ($414,524,422 in 2025 dollars) for initial licenses to produce the Wankel rotary engine. GM president Ed Cole projected its release in October 1973 as a 1974 Vega option. The General Motors Rotary Combustion Engine (GMRCE) had two rotors displacing 206 cu in (3,376 cc), twin distributors and coils, and an aluminum housing. RC2-206 Wankels were installed in 1973 Vegas for cold weather testing in Canada.

Motor Trend's 1973 article The '75 Vega Rotary said, "[M]ileage will be in the 16–18 mpg range. Compared to the normal piston [engine] Vega's 20 to 26 mpg, the whole rotary deal begins to look just a little less attractive, what with the price of gasoline skyrocketing..."

GM thought it could meet 1975 emissions standards with the engine tuned for better fuel economy. Other refinements improved it to 20 mpg_{‑US} (12 L/100 km; 24 mpg_{‑imp}), but brought apex seal failures and rotor-tip seal problems. By December 1973 it was clear the Wankel, now planned for the Monza 2+2, would not be ready for either production or emissions certification in time for the start of the 1975 model year. After paying another $10 million ($72,526,237 in 2025 dollars) against its rotary licence fees, GM announced the first postponement. In April 1974 Motor Trend predicted the outcome: on September 24, 1974, Cole postponed the engine, ostensibly due to emissions difficulties. He retired the same month. His successor Pete Estes showed little interest in the engine and GM, citing poor fuel economy, postponed production pending further development. Estes had previously decided to let the Corvair, another Cole project, expire, well before the celebrated attacks of Ralph Nader.

One complete GM Wankel engine exists. It is displayed at the Ypsilanti (MI) Motor Heritage Museum, along with many Corvair cars and exhibits.

=== V8 ===
In July 1972, Hot Rod tested a prototype Vega fitted with an all-aluminum V8, the last of several 283 cu in. (4.6 L) units used in the CERV I research and development vehicle. Bored out to 302 cu in (4.9 L), it had high-compression pistons, "097 Duntov" mechanical-lifter camshaft, cast-iron four-barrel intake manifold, and a Quadrajet carburetor. With stock Turbo Hydramatic, stock Vega rear end and street tires, the car ran a sub-14-second quarter-mile.

== Assembly ==
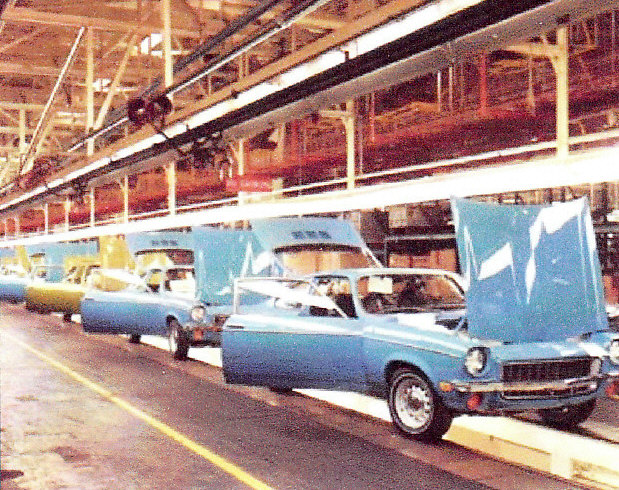
Lordstown Assembly, Vega Final Line

GM built the $75 million ($694,377,990 in 2025 dollars) Lordstown Assembly plant in Lordstown, Ohio, near Youngstown expressly for assembing the Vega. It was the world's most automated auto plant at the time, where approximately 90 percent of each Vega body's 3,900 welds were carried out by 75 automatic welding devices. Twenty-six Unimate industrial robots performed ~35% of the welding operations; approximately 55% of the welding operations were performed with conventional automatic welders. Engine and rear axle assemblies were positioned by hydraulic lifts, with bodies moved along the line overhead at 30 feet (9.1 m) per minute. Sub-assembly areas, conveyor belts, and quality control were all computer-directed.

=== Production speed ===
Production at Lordstown was projected at 100 Vegas an hour—one every 36 seconds—from the outset. Twice the normal production volume, this was the fastest rate in the world. Within months Lordstown produced 73.5 Vegas an hour.

Lordstown workers had 36 seconds to perform their tasks instead of the customary minute. With 25 percent more line workers than needed, they formed groups in which three worked while a fourth rested. Although there were mechanical flaws, the quality of early Vega assembly, e.g. fit and finish, was acceptable. The car earned Motor Trend's 1971 Car of the Year award. In October 1971, General Motors handed management of Lordstown from Chevrolet and Fisher Body to General Motors Assembly Division (GMAD). GMAD imposed more rigorous discipline and cut costs by dropping the fourth "extra" worker. The United Auto Workers (UAW) said 800 workers were laid off at Lordstown in the first year under GMAD; GMAD said 370. Management accused workers of slowing the line and sabotaging cars by omitting parts and doing shoddy work. Workers said GMAD sped up the line and cut staffing. Quality suffered. In March 1972, the 7,700 workers called a wildcat strike that lasted a month and cost GM $150 million. Vega production rose by over 100,000 units for 1972, and would have been stronger but for the strike. 1975 was a "rolling model change" at 100 cars per hour with no downtime.

As production approached 100 vehicles per hour, problems arose in the paint shop. At 85 units per hour, nearly all required repair. Conventional spray pressures and atomizing tips could not apply the paint fast enough, but increasing pressures and tip aperture sizes produced runs and sags in the finished product. Fisher Body and lacquer paint supplier DuPont, over one weekend, developed new paint chemistry and application specifics: Non-Aqueous Dispersion Lacquer (NAD). The new formulation raised paint shop throughput to 106 units per hour.

=== Vertical rail transport ===
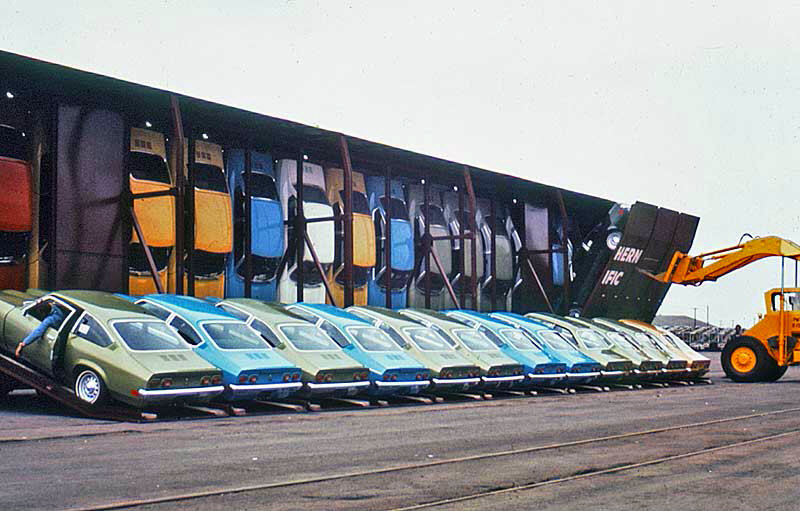
30 Vegas to a single Vert-A-Pac

Although Lordstown Assembly had a purpose-built exit off of the Ohio Turnpike constructed to make shipment easier, the Vega was designed for vertical shipment, nose down. General Motors and Southern Pacific designed "Vert-A-Pac" rail cars to hold 30 Vegas each, compared with conventional tri-level autoracks which held 18. The Vega was fitted with four removable cast-steel sockets on the underside and had plastic spacers — removed at unloading — to protect engine and transmission mounts. The rail car carrier-panels were opened and closed via forklift.

Vibration and low-speed crash tests ensured the cars would not shift or suffer damage in transit. The Vega was delivered topped with fluids, ready to drive to dealerships, so the engine was baffled to prevent oil entering the number one cylinder; the battery filler caps were positioned high on the rear edge of the casing to prevent acid spills; a tube drained fuel from the carburetor to the vapor canister; and the windshield washer bottle stood at 45 degrees. The Vert-A-Pacs were retired after the Vega's 1977 model year.

=== Production figures ===
Total Vega production, mainly from Lordstown, was 2,006,661 including 3,508 Cosworth models. Production peaked at 2,400 units per day. In 1973–1974, Vegas were also built at GM of Canada's Sainte-Thérèse Assembly plant in Quebec.

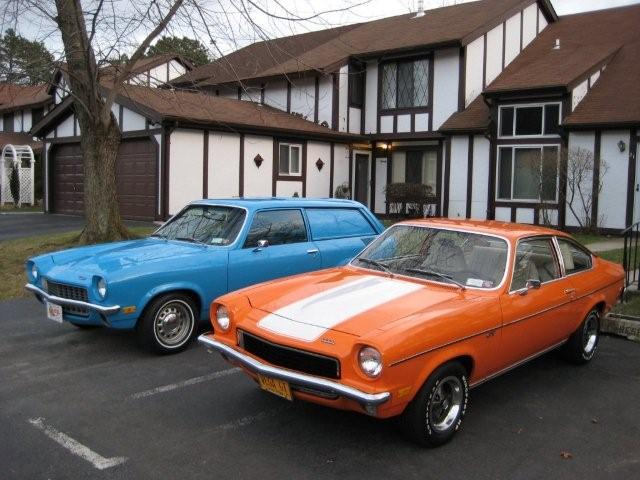
1971 Vega Panel Express and 1973 Vega GT Millionth Vega limited edition

Year	Notchback	Hatchback	Kammback	Panel delivery	Cosworth	Totals
1971	58,804	168,308	42,793	7,800	—	277,705
1972	55,839	262,682	71,957	4,114	—	394,592
1973	58,425	266,124	102,751	unknown	—	427,300^{1}
1974	64,720	276,028	115,337	4,289	—	460,374
1975	35,133	112,912	56,133	1,525	2,061	207,764
1976	27,619	77,409	54,049	—	1,447	160,524
1977	12,365	37,395	25,181	—	—	78,402
						2,006,661^{1}
Notes:^{1} Does not include an unknown number of 1973 panel delivery models, estimated to be around 4000 units.

== Pricing ==
Due mostly to inflation, but also because of emissions and safety mandates, prices of all automobiles rose 50 percent during the Vega's seven-year lifespan. The same basic Vega that cost $2090 in 1971 carried a retail price of $3249 by the end of 1977. And since all other cars suffered the same inflationary rise, less expensive cars were in greater demand than those with higher prices which helped Vegas sell. The 1975 Cosworth Vega at $5,918 was priced $892 below the Chevrolet Corvette. "Cosworth. One Vega for the price of two", as it was advertised, was priced out of the market, and fell well short of its projected sales goal.

== DeLorean influence ==
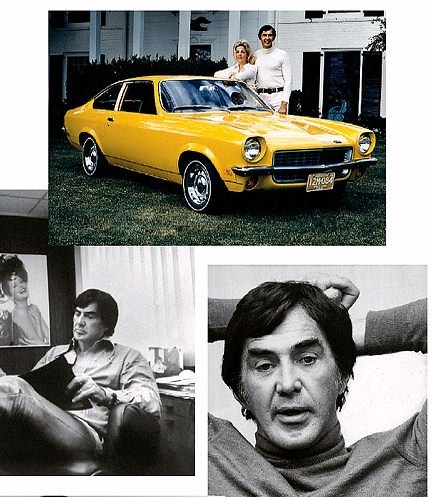
John DeLorean and Vega 2300 in 1970

GM Vice President John Z. DeLorean, appointed Chevrolet's general manager a year before the Vega's introduction, was tasked with overseeing the Vega launch and directing operations at the Lordstown Assembly plant. As problems with the vehicle became apparent, he put additional inspectors and workers on the line and introduced a computerized quality control program in which each car was inspected as it came off the line and, if necessary, repaired. He was also tasked with promoting the car in Motor Trend and Look magazines. He authorized the Cosworth Vega prototype and requested initiation of production.

In Motor Trend's August 1970 issue, DeLorean promoted the upcoming car as one that out-handled "almost any" European sports car, out-accelerated "any car in its price class", and would be "built at a quality level that has never been attained before in a manufacturing operation in this country, and probably in the world."

In the 1979 book On a Clear Day You Can See General Motors by J. Patrick Wright, DeLorean spoke of hostility between Chevrolet Division and GM's design and engineering staff; of trying to motivate Chevrolet engineers to resolve the car's problems before introduction; and of initiating quality control. He also said, "While I was convinced that we were doing our best with the car that was given to us, I was called upon by the corporation to tout the car far beyond my personal convictions about it."

== Problems ==
Although the Vega sold well from the beginning, the buying public soon questioned the car's quality. The issues with the vehicle practically went back to the beginning of its development. For example, the front end of the vehicle separated in only eight miles on the General Motors Test track. The engineers had to add twenty pounds of structural reinforcements to pass durability. In Comeback:The Fall & Rise of the American Automobile Industry, the authors write: "In 1972, GM issued three mass recalls, the largest covering 500,000 Vegas, to fix defective axles, balky throttles and problems that caused fires. The Vega's aluminum engine was notorious for buckling and leaking." By May 1972, six out of every seven Vegas produced was the subject of a recall. Development and upgrades continued throughout the car's seven-year production run, addressing its engine and cost-related issues.

=== Recalls ===
The first Vega recall, Chevrolet campaign number 72-C-05, addressed engine backfires on 130,000 cars fitted with the L11 option two-barrel carburetor. An engine that backfired with specific frequency and magnitude weakened and ruptured the muffler. Hot exhaust gases then, in turn, spilled out and heated the adjacent fuel tank which expanded, ruptured and spilled fuel that ignited and caused a fire. The second recall in early summer 1972, Chevrolet campaign number 72-C-07, involved 350,000 vehicles equipped with the standard engine and single-barrel carburetor. It concerned a perceived risk that a component in the emission-control system (idle stop solenoid bracket) might fall into the throttle linkage, jamming it open. Chevrolet told customers that if the throttle stuck open while driving, to turn off the ignition and brake the vehicle until it stopped.

In July 1972, the company announced the third recall, "in as many months," campaign number 72-C-09, which affected 526,000 vehicles, the result of which was a rear axle which could separate from the vehicle. As it was recorded by NHTSA, the "axle shaft and wheel could then move outboard of the quarter panel and allow vehicle to drop down onto rear suspension."

=== Dura-Built 140 engine ===
Other quality issues plagued the engine. Faulty valve-stem seals caused excessive oil consumption, but this was not addressed until the release of the updated Dura-Built 140 engine in 1976. According to an article in Popular Mechanics, "When the engine got hot, which wasn't uncommon, the cylinders distorted and the piston rings wore off the exposed silica that was meant to provide a tough wall surface. Then, at best, the cars burned more oil. At worst, the distortion compromised the head gasket."

With its small 6-US-quart (5.7 L) capacity and tiny two-tube 1-square-foot (0.1 m^{2}) radiator, the Vega cooling system was adequate when topped off, but owners tended not to check the coolant level often enough, and in combination with leaking valve-stem seals, the engine often ran low on oil and coolant simultaneously. Consequent overheating distorted the open-deck block, allowing antifreeze to seep past the head gasket, which caused piston scuffing inside the cylinders.

Chevrolet added a coolant-overflow bottle and an electronic low-coolant indicator in 1974 that could be retrofitted to earlier models at no cost. Under a revised 50,000-mile (80,000 km) engine warranty for 1971 to 1975 Vegas, the owner of a damaged engine could choose a replacement with a new short block or a rebuilt steel-sleeved unit, which proved costly for Chevrolet. GM engineer Fred Kneisler maintains that too much emphasis had been put on overheating problems, the real culprits being brittle valve stem seals and too-thin piston plating. Regardless of the cause, damaged cylinder walls were common.

=== Fisher Body ===
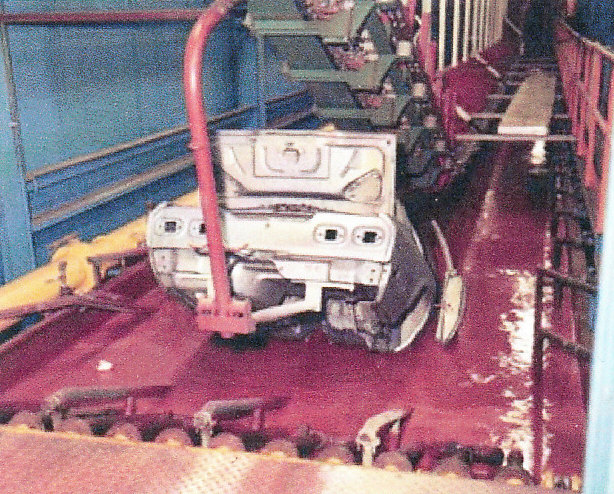
Fisher Body Vega Elpo dip

On the early Vegas, Fisher's rustproofing process did not treat the entire chassis. The six-stage zinc phosphate rustproofing process began with the untreated steel body shells spending two minutes submerged in a 65,000-US-gallon (246,000 L; 54,000 imp gal) electrophoretic painting vat (Fisher Body Division’s "Elpo" electrophoretic deposition of polymers process) to prime and further protect from rust. Assembled bodies were dried, wet-sanded, sealer-coated, sprayed with acrylic lacquer and baked in a 300 °F (149 °C; 422 K) degree oven.

However, there was a process failure during the vat treatment stage because a trapped air pocket prevented the anti-rust coating from reaching a gap between the Vegas’ front fenders and cowl. Under normal driving conditions, this allowed moist debris and salt to build up and rust the untreated steel on early Vegas because they had no protective liners. The finance department had rejected liners as they would have added a $2.28 unit cost. After GM spent millions replacing thousands of corroded fenders under warranty, Chevrolet installed stopgap plastic deflectors in late 1973 and full plastic liners in 1974. Rust also damaged the rocker panels and door bottoms, the area beneath the windshield, and the body above the rockers. It sometimes seized the front suspension cam bolts, preventing alignment work, necessitating removal with a cutting torch and replacement by all-new parts.

From 1976, anti-rust improvements included galvanized steel fenders and rocker panels; "four-layer" fender protection with zinc-coated and primed inner fenders; wheel-well protective mastic; zinc-rich pre-prime coating on inner doors; expandable sealer between rear quarter panel and wheel housing panel; and corrosion-resistant grille and headlamp housings.

The 1976 to 1977 Dura-Built 140 engine had improved engine block coolant pathways, redesigned head gasket, water pump and thermostat, and a five-year/60,000 mi (97,000 km) warranty.

== Reception ==
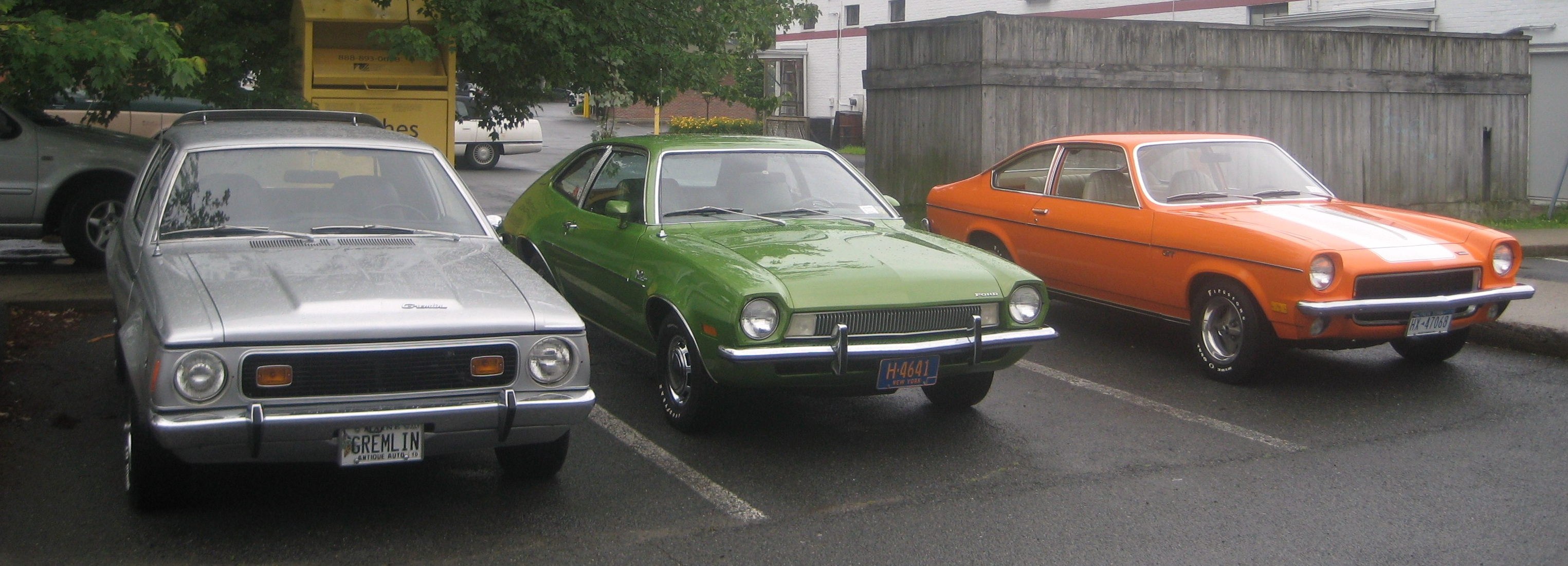
First-generation American sub compacts, left to right: AMC Gremlin, Ford Pinto, Chevrolet Vega

Initially, the Vega received awards and praise, but subsequently, there were lasting criticisms.

The Vega received awards including "1971 car of the year" and "1973 car of the year in the economy class"; from Motor Trend; "best economy sedan" in 1971, 1972 and 1973 from Car and Driver; and the 1971 award for "excellence in design in transportation equipment" from American Iron and Steel Institute.

Favorable reviews at launch included Motor Trend which in 1970 described the Vega as enjoyable, functional, comfortable, with good handling, and ride; Road and Track who praised its visibility, freeway cruising and economy. and others who praised the 2300 engine's simplicity, the handling package and brakes, and one said the car was well matched to the tastes and needs of the 1970s,

Others praised its looks.

Comparisons with other contemporary cars such as the Ford Pinto, Volkswagen Beetle, AMC Gremlin, and Toyota Corolla were done by a number of magazines. The Vega came out well, scoring praise for its combination of performance and economy"; as well as its speed, comfort, quietness and better ride. Road and Track's editor, John R. Bond said in September 1970, "I think the Vega is, beyond a doubt, the best handling passenger car ever built in the U.S. It has many other good qualities, but the road holding impressed and surprised me most of all."

The Center for Auto Safety criticized the car. A letter from its founder Ralph Nader to GM chairman Richard Gerstenberg contained a list of safety allegations, and said the car was a "sloppily crafted, unreliable and unsafe automobile" that "hardly set a good example in small car production for American industry". Criticisms continued long after production ceased. In 1979, Popular Science said free repairs in the 1970s cost tens of millions, continuing up to two years after the warranty ran out. A 1990 Time article said the Vega was "a poorly engineered car notorious for rust and breakdowns." In 1991, Newsweek magazine called the Vega costlier and more troublesome than its rivals.

Joe Sherman's 1993 book In the Rings of Saturn said that "by its third recall, ninety-five percent of all Vegas manufactured before May 1972 had critical safety flaws", and that the model's "checkered history only reinforced the belief that GM made inferior small cars. This legacy would prove far more important than any direct impact the Vega would have on GM's profits." Motor Trend said in its September 1999 50th Anniversary Issue: "The Vega seemed well placed to set the standard for subcompacts in the 70s, but it was troubled by one of the most vulnerable Achilles heels in modern automotive history: an alloy four-cylinder engine block that self-destructed all too easily, and all too often. Once the word got out, the damage was done, even though the engine had been revamped." The April 2000 issue of Collectible Automobile magazine said: "The Chevy Vega has become a symbol of all the problems Detroit faced in the 70's." Robert Freeland's 2005 book The Struggle for Control of the Modern Corporation said "poor planning and perfunctory implementation ... led to an extremely poor quality automobile beset by mechanical problems."

In his 2010 book Generation Busted, author Alan Zemek said, "Chevrolet's answer to the Japanese car, left it with a black eye."

Websites have included the Vega in lists of worst cars, for example Popular Mechanics, Car and Driver, and Edmunds.com. In 2010, John Pearley Huffman of Popular Mechanics summed up the Vega as "the car that nearly destroyed GM." In 2010, after driving a preserved, original '73 Vega GT, Frank Markus of Motor Trend Classic said, "After a few gentle miles, I begin to understand how this car won its awards and comparison tests. Well-maintained examples are great looking, nice-driving, economical classics—like Baltic Ave. with a Hotel, the best ones can be had for $10K or less."

In 2013, Frank Markus of Motor Trend Classic said, "Overblown—The China Syndrome might have over hyped the TMI (Three-Mile Island) incident as bad press might have exaggerated the Vega's woes."

== Rebadged variants ==
Vega body styles were used for several badge engineered variants. The 1973 to 1977 Pontiac Astre had Vega bodies (and Vega engines through 1976). The 1978 to 1979 Chevrolet Monza and Pontiac Sunbird wagons used the Vega Kammback wagon body with engines by Pontiac and Buick. The Monza S used the Vega hatchback body.

== XP-898 concept ==
In 1973, Chevrolet presented the XP-898 concept car using many Vega components, including the engine, and using a construction method intended to explore vehicle crashworthiness at high speed: a fiberglass foam sandwich body and chassis in four sections with rigid urethane foam infill.

== Motorsport ==
=== Car and Driver's reader challenge race ===
In the early 1970s Car and Driver magazine challenged its readers to a series of Sports Car Club of America (SCCA) races for showroom stock sedans at Lime Rock Park, Connecticut – "The Car and Driver SS/Sedan Challenge". Bruce Cargill (representing the readers) won "Challenge I" in 1972 in a Dodge Colt, and Patrick Bedard, C&D's executive writer, won "Challenge II" in 1973 in an Opel 1900, "Challenge III" was the tie-breaker in 1974.

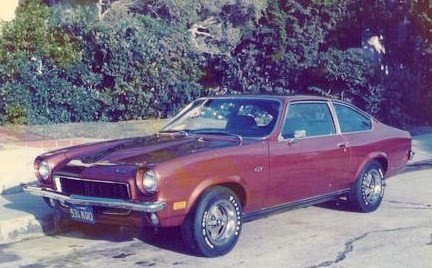
1973 Vega GT in metallic bronze

On October 12, 1974 C&D's 1973 Vega GT No. 0, driven by Bedard, "outran every single Opel, Colt, Pinto, Datsun, Toyota and Subaru on the starting grid [...] It had done the job – this Vega GT faced off against 31 other well-driven showroom stocks and it had finished first."

After Bedard purchased the year-old Vega in California for $1,900, former Chevrolet engineer Doug Roe – a Vega specialist – told him to "overfill it about a quart. "When you run them over 5,000 rpm, all the oil stays up in the head and you'll wipe the bearings. And something has to be done with the crankcase vents. If you don't it'll pump all that oil into the intake." Roe added that 215 degrees was normal and only above 230 degrees would the engine probably detonate.

Bedard said, "Five laps from the end I discovered that once the tank drops below a quarter full, the fuel wouldn't pick up in the right turns. Twice per lap the carburetor would momentarily run dry. And if that wasn't bad enough, the temperature gauge read exactly 230 degrees and a white Opel was on my tail as unshakably as a heat-seeking missile. But it was also clear that no matter how good a driver Don Knowles was and no matter how quick his Opel, he wasn't going to get by if the Vega simply stayed alive. Which it did. You have to admire a car like that. If it wins, it must be the best, never mind all of the horror stories you hear, some of them from me."
