= Spark plug wires =

Type of electrical cable

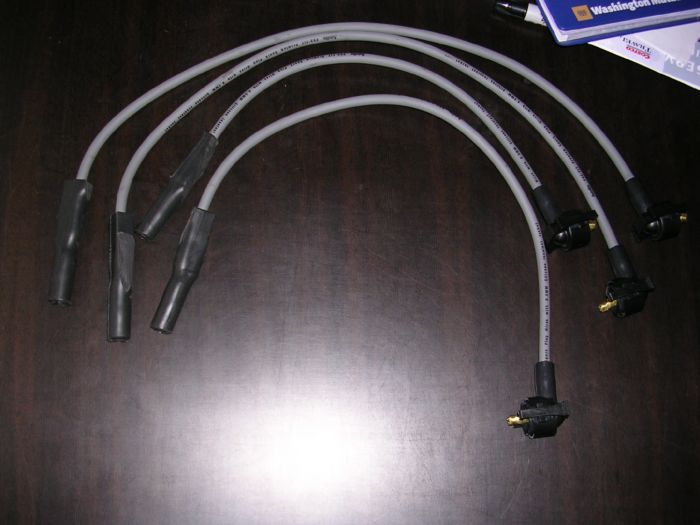
Four spark plug wires (distributor end on the right, spark plug end on the left)

Spark plug wires (also called high tension leads) are electrical cables used by older internal combustion engines to transmit high-voltage electricity from the distributor to the spark plugs . Tension in this instance is a synonym for voltage. High tension may also be referred to as HT.

Many modern engines use coil-on-plug ignition, a design that does not use spark plug wires.

== Design ==
Spark plug wires have an outer insulation several times thicker than the conductor, made of a very flexible and heat-resistant material such as silicone or EPDM rubber. The thick insulation prevents arcing from the cable to an earthed engine component. A rubber "boot" covers each terminal. Dielectric grease can be used to improve insulation; a small amount can be applied in the inside of the rubber boot at each end of each wire to help seal out moisture. Printing on spark plug wires may include a brand name, insulation thickness (in millimeters), insulation material type, cylinder number, and conductor type (suppressor or solid wire).

The wire from each spark plug is just long enough to reach the distributor, without excess. Each lead contains only one wire, as the current does not return through the same lead, but through the earthed/grounded engine which is connected to the opposite battery terminal (negative terminal on modern engines). Each end of a spark plug wire has a metal terminal that clips onto the spark plug and distributor, coil, or magneto. There are dedicated spark plug wire pliers, tools designed for removing the terminal from a spark plug without damaging it.

To reduce radio frequency interference (RFI) produced by the spark being radiated by the wires, which may cause malfunction of sensitive electronic systems in modern vehicles or interfere with the car radio, various means in the spark plug and associated lead have been used over time to reduce the nuisance:

1. Copper conductors (no suppression)
2. Resistor in spark plug with copper conductor
3. Compressed carbon powder as conductor in the lead to act as a resistor
4. Stainless steel wire wound as a coil in the lead with a resistance of about 1300 ohms/meter since 1980s. This acts as an inductor and a resistor

== Coil wire ==
Older ignition systems with a separate ignition coil use a coil wire between the ignition coil and the distributor. A coil wire is of the same construction as a spark plug wire, but generally shorter and with different terminals. Some distributors have an ignition coil built inside them, eliminating the need for a separate coil wire, such as the High Energy Ignition (HEI) system used by General Motors in the 1970s and 1980s.

Some engines instead used multiple ignition coils (one for each pair of cylinders) built into a coil pack, eliminating the need for a distributor and coil wire.

== Alternatives ==
Many modern car engines use coil-on-plug ignition, which eliminates the need for spark plug wires.

Diesel engines do not use spark plugs, and therefore do not use spark plug wires either.

== See also ==
- Power cable
