= Chevrolet Cosworth Vega =

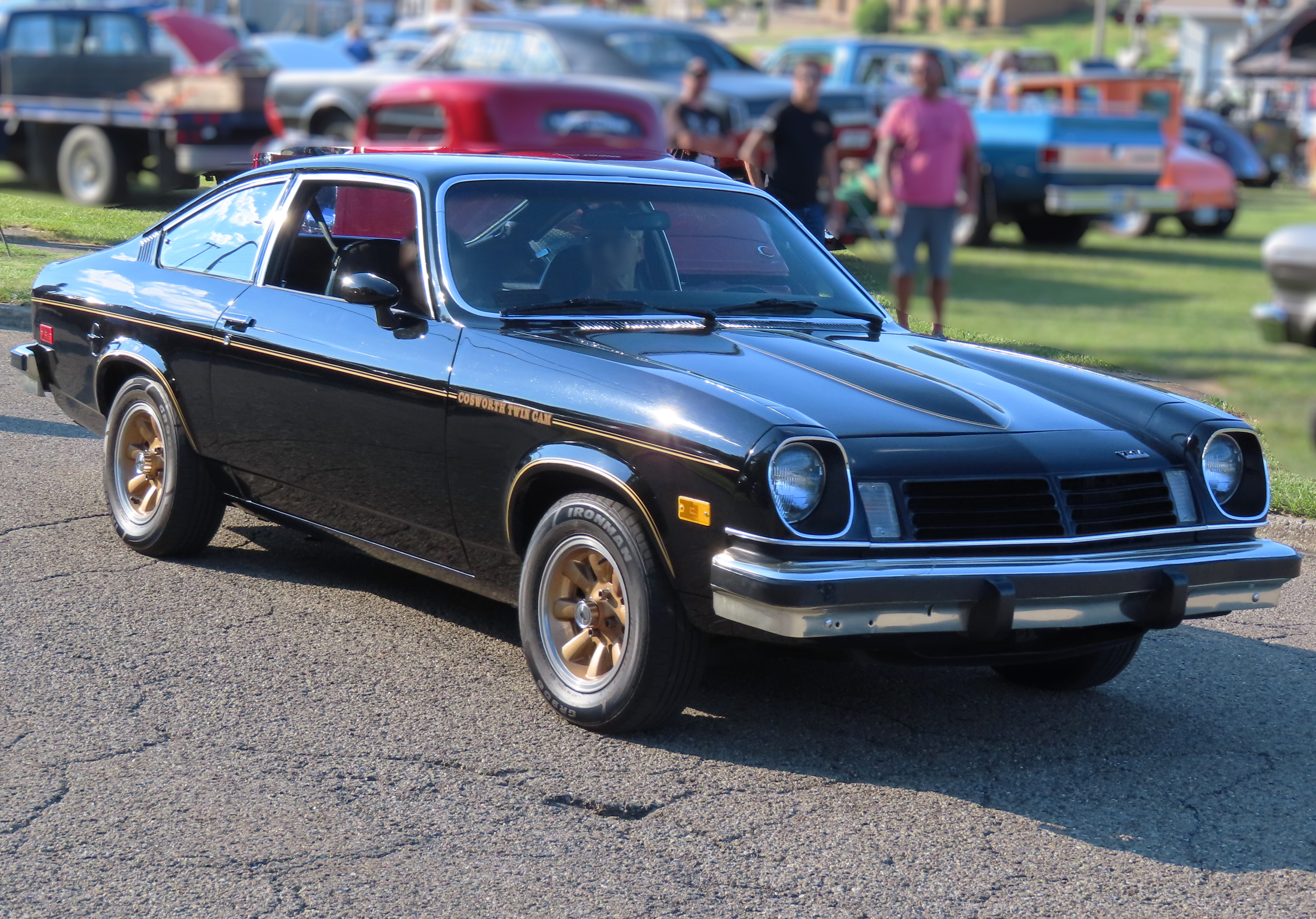
- 1975 Chevrolet Cosworth Vega

Overview
- Manufacturer: Chevrolet (General Motors)
- Also called: Cosworth Twin-Cam
- Production: March 1974–1976
- Model years: 1975–1976
- Assembly: Lordstown Assembly-; Lordstown, Ohio, United States
- Designer: GM & Chevrolet design staff; Chief stylist: Bill Mitchell; Engine designer: Calvin Wade

Body and chassis
- Class: Subcompact
- Body style: 3-door hatchback coupe
- Layout: FR layout
- Platform: GM H platform (RWD)

Powertrain
- Engine: 2.0 L (122 cu in) DOHC EFI I4
- Transmission: 4-speed manual; 5-speed manual w/overdrive (1976)

Dimensions
- Wheelbase: 97.0 in (2,464 mm)
- Length: 176.4 in (4,481 mm)
- Width: 65.4 in (1,661 mm)
- Height: 50.0 in (1,270 mm)
- Curb weight: 2,760 lb (1,250 kg)

The Chevrolet Cosworth Vega is a subcompact four-passenger automobile produced by Chevrolet for the 1975 and 1976 model years. It is a limited-production, high-performance version of the Chevrolet Vega.

Chevrolet developed the car's all-aluminum inline-four 122 cu in (1,999 cc) engine, and British company Cosworth Engineering designed the DOHC cylinder head. 5,000 engines were built.

3,508 cars were made. They cost nearly twice as much as a base Vega, and only US$900 less than the 1975 Chevrolet Corvette.

== History ==
=== Racing origin ===
Known at Cosworth Engineering as Project EA, a Cosworth racing engine based on the Vega aluminum block produced a reported 260 hp (190 kW) and powered Chevron and Lola race cars to wins in the 2-liter class in their first outings. The Cosworth Vega engine, RPO Z09, is a de-tuned version. Bore, stroke and valve sizes are identical but it lacks the EA engine's dry sump lubricating system, has a lower compression ratio and different valve timing, and uses Bendix electronic fuel injection instead of Lucas mechanical injection to cope with a wider range of operating conditions as well as emission controls.

=== Development ===
In March, 1970 John DeLorean, GM's general manager and vice-president, sent engine designer Calvin Wade to England in search of cylinder head technology to improve the Vega's performance. Fuel injection would be needed to control emissions without power loss; also stronger internal parts to work with the existing block and the Cosworth head. That summer, DeLorean authorized Wade to build a prototype Cosworth Vega engine. A meager budget, and resistance from managers between Wade and DeLorean, meant low priority for the project, but once approved by DeLorean it could not be killed.

In June, 1971 the prototype gave 170 hp (130 kW) on dual Holley-Weber two-barrel carburetors. At Easter, 1972 GM President Edward Cole drove three Vegas for comparison: a base model, an all-aluminum small-block V8-powered prototype, and the Cosworth. He pledged approval from the Engineering Policy Group for DeLorean's request to initiate Cosworth production. Approval of development aimed at U.S. Environmental Protection Agency (EPA) certification soon followed, and Wade began a 12-car development program to accumulate test mileage in a range of environments including high altitude, heat and cold, to test the engine's eligibility. At the GM desert proving ground, the car reached 122 mph (196 km/h).

In April, 1973 the design was frozen and two cars were built to accumulate mileage for EPA emission certification. The press was notified of the program and in August 1973 a Car and Driver feature alerted the public to an upcoming 140 hp (100 kW) Cosworth Vega. The engine needed more dynamometer time, new cam profiles to trade some high-end power for more low-end torque, and a tubular header to replace the cast iron exhaust manifold. Although delayed, the project now received higher priority, more engineering manpower and more funding. Chevrolet dealers began accepting large deposits for early delivery.

The design was frozen again in January, 1974. A stainless steel header was specified, to increase power between 2,000 rpm up and the 7,000 rpm redline. Camshaft lift and duration were eased back and the torque curve reshaped to a street-oriented peak of 5,200 rpm. Project coordinator William Large built two cars for durability testing. By April 1974, the engines ran "clean" for 40,000 miles (64,000 km), after which hydrocarbon curves on the first car rose far in excess of the permitted 3 grams per mile (1.9 g/km), owing to burned exhaust valves. For certification, five months' durability miles would have to be re-accumulated.

Development resumed, to improve emissions durability and ready the engine for more stringent 1975 standards. The fuel injection was redesigned for better air distribution. High-energy electronic ignition and mandatory catalytic converter were added; also a Pulse Air system, functionally the same as an air pump but without the pump's six-horsepower loss. A larger catalytic converter further guarded against power loss. More advanced ignition timing, and the lead-free fuel required with the converter, prevented exhaust-valve failure.

Chevrolet required all engines to survive 200 hours at full load. The Cosworth lasted over 500 hours. For a clutch burst test, Cale Wade revved the engine to 9,400 rpm under its own power without damage to clutch or engine. Three cars, in three different configurations, resumed mileage accumulation in September 1974.

By January, 1975 the mileage was completed with no failures. One configuration stayed within 1975 California limits, making the Cosworth Vega the only GM car certified for all 50 states. On March 14, 1975 the EPA emissions certificate was issued, allowing sale of 1975 models. Production began immediately to fill the order backlog. 30 engines per day were hand-built — two- and three-worker teams to each engine — in the Tonawanda, New York engine plant's "clean room", originally devised for the ZL-1 all-aluminum 427 cu in (7.0 L) V8. At the Vega's Lordstown assembly plant, Cosworth production was 1.6 cars per hour. Cosworth Vega 0001, the original Chicago Auto Show vehicle, with a clear Plexiglas hood, is in the GM Heritage Collection.

== Overview and changes ==
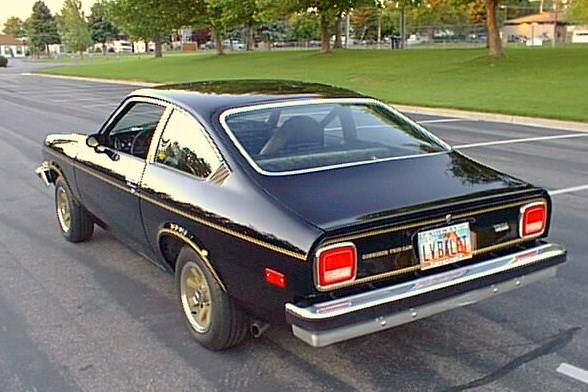
1975 Cosworth Vega

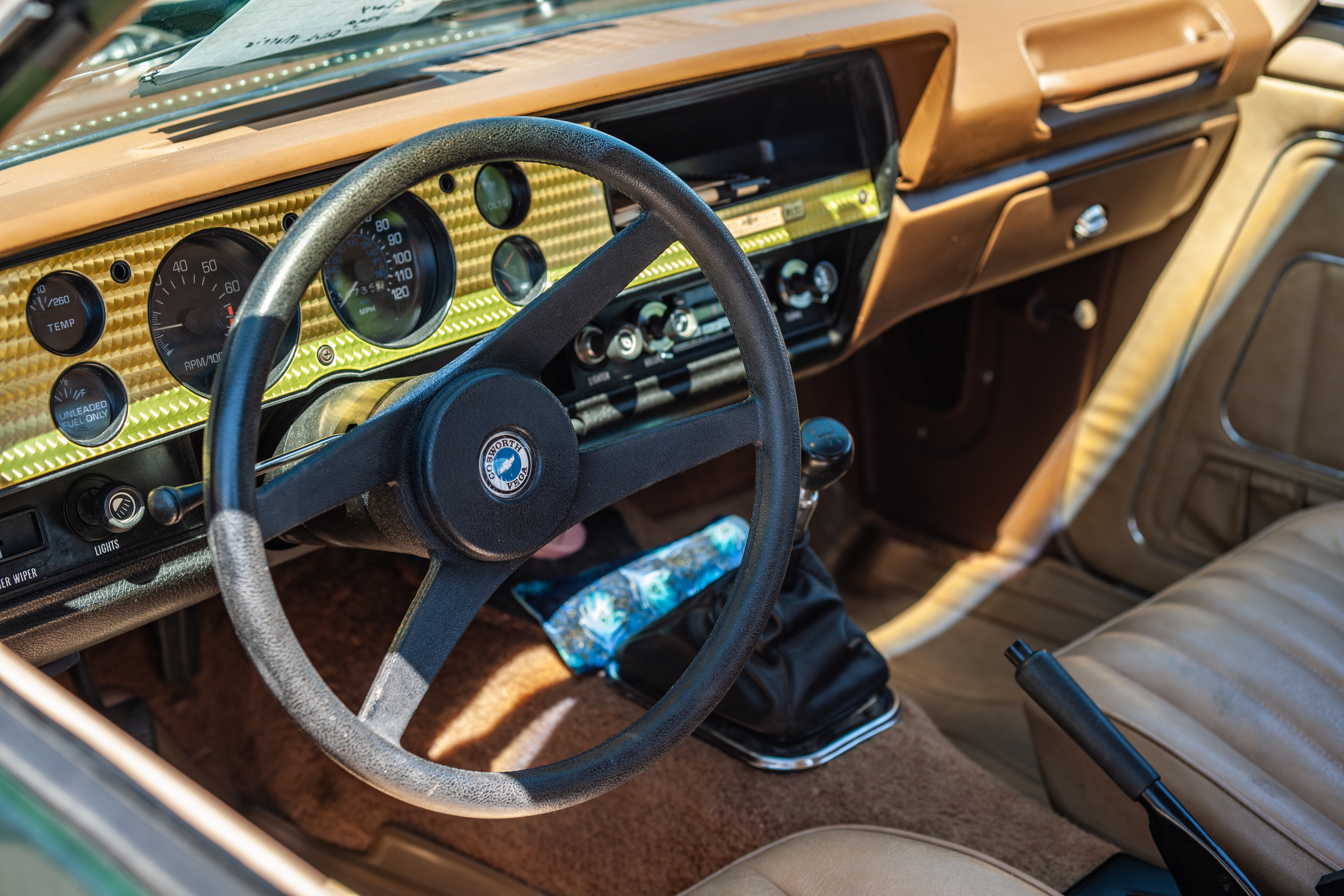
Cosworth Vega Interior

All 2,061 1975 Cosworth Vegas were finished in black acrylic lacquer with gold "Cosworth Twin Cam" lettering on the front fenders and rear cove panel and gold pinstriping on hood bulge, body sides, wheel openings, and rear cove. (Black was not offered on other Vegas until mid-1976.) Most have black interiors. The custom interior with perforated vinyl seat trim (RPO ZJ1) was standard, with black cloth seat inserts a $50 option. About 16 percent had white vinyl interiors. All Cosworths had a gold-colored engine-turned dash bezel, gold-plated dash plaque with build sequence number, 8,000 rpm tachometer, and Cosworth Twin-Cam Vega steering wheel emblem.

The 'Torque arm' rear suspension is like that of the Monza 2+2, and the axle, from the Monza 2+2, gives a 3.73:1 ratio from a 7.5-inch (190 mm) ring gear. A limited-slip differential was optional. Included were GT springs, shocks, and stabilizer bars (larger at the rear than the Vega GT's); exclusive BR70-13 BSW radial tires on British-made 6 inch, gold-painted cast aluminum wheels with Chevy center caps; black-finished wiper arms, H.D. radiator and provisions for "Fast Steer" option. The Cosworth was the first Chevrolet passenger car with electronic fuel injection. Air conditioning, power steering and power brakes were not offered. A pilot line 1976 model was built in September 1975, and volume 1976 production began in December 1975.

A 1976 facelift included wider grille, tri-color tail lamps and extensive body anti-rust improvements. A new Borg-Warner five-speed manual overdrive transmission with 4.10 axle was optional. The exhaust system had a single tailpipe instead of 1975's dual outlets. Seat trim changed to grained vinyl, and the optional extra-charge cloth trim seat inserts were changed to a "houndstooth" type named sport-cloth. In January, a "Sky-Roof" with tinted reflectorized sliding glass and 8-track tape player options were introduced. In February, eight 1976 Vega exterior colors were added: Antique White, Dark Blue Metallic, Firethorn Metallic, Mahogany Metallic, Dark Green Metallic, Buckskin, Medium Saddle Metallic, and Medium Orange; plus two additional interior colors, Firethorn and Buckskin. 1,447 1976 models were built. In November 1975, it had been decided to discontinue the car after the 1976 model year. Total production of 3,508 cars ended in July 1976 with a Medium Saddle Metallic model delivered to a Cleveland, Ohio dealer. 190,321 Vega hatchback coupes were produced in the same period.

== Engine ==
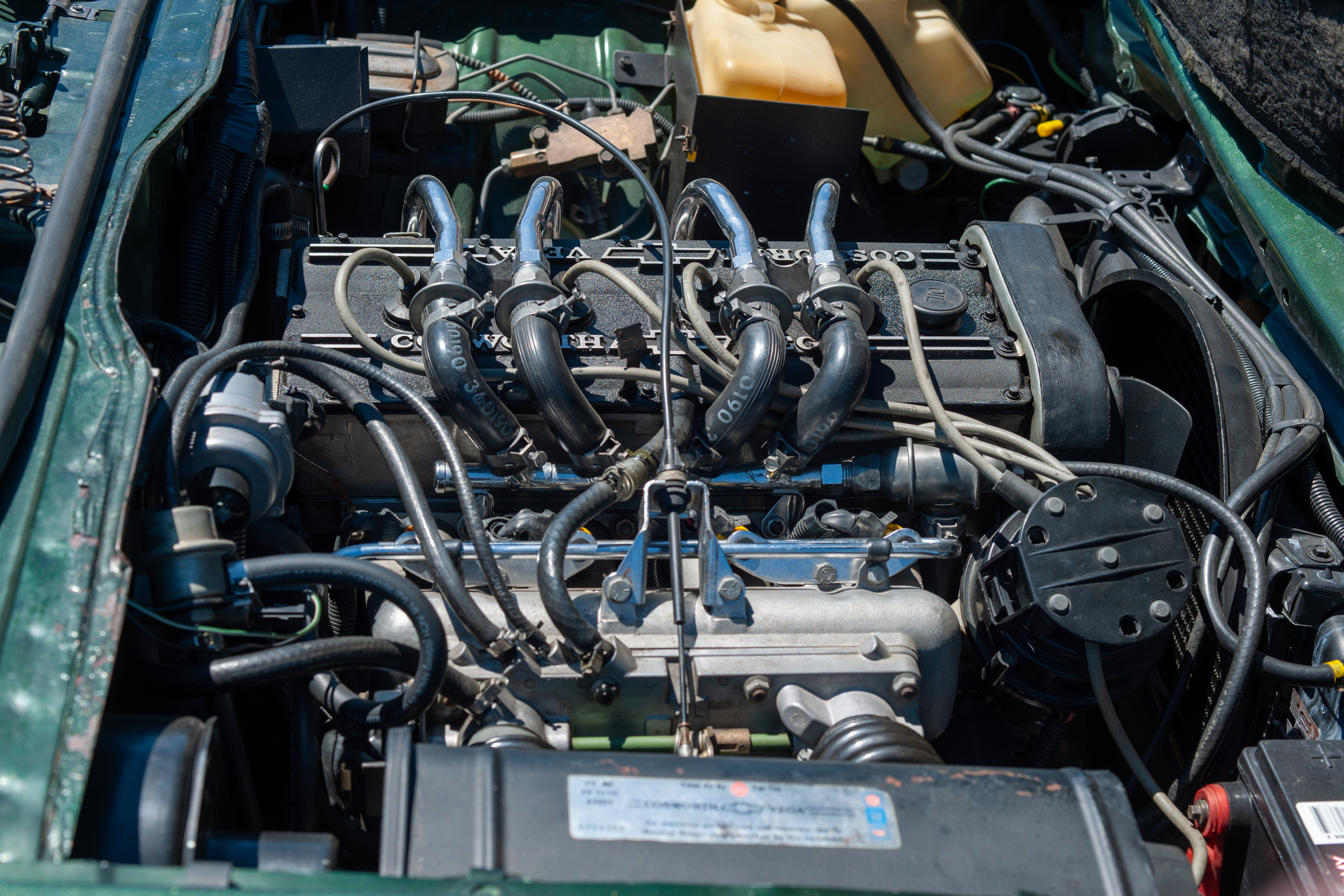
Cosworth Twin-Cam 16-valve, 122 cu in (2.0 L) EFI I-4, 110 hp

The Cosworth Vega Twin-Cam engine is a 122 cu in (1,999 cc) inline-four with die-cast aluminum alloy cylinder block and Type 356 aluminum alloy, 16-valve cylinder head with double overhead camshafts (DOHC) held in a removable cam-carrier that doubles as a guide for the valve lifters. Each camshaft has five bearings and is turned by individual cam gears on the front end. The camshafts, water pump and fan are driven by a fiberglass cord-reinforced neoprene rubber belt, much like the SOHC Vega 2300 engine. The cylinder head has sintered iron valve seats and cast iron valve seats. Race-bred forged aluminum pistons with heat-treated forged steel crankshaft and connecting rods enhance durability.

The engine has a stainless steel exhaust header and Bendix electronic fuel injection (EFI), with four injector valves, an electronic control unit (ECU), five independent sensors and two fuel pumps. Some 60 lb (27 kg) lighter than the SOHC Vega engine, it develops maximum power at 5,600 rpm and is redlined at 6,500 rpm, whereas the SOHC Vega engine peaks at 4,400 rpm and runs to 5,000 rpm. Final ratings are 110 hp (82 kW) at 5,600 rpm, 107 lb⋅ft (145 N⋅m) of torque at 4,800 rpm. 3,508 of the 5,000 engines were used. GM disassembled about 500 and scrapped the remainder.

== Reviews ==
Car and Driver said in August 1973: "Cosworth Vega 16-Valve. More than an engine. A taut-muscled GT coupe to devastate the smugness of BMW 2002tii's and 5-speed Alfa GTV's. A limited run of 4000 machines, each one built away from the tumult of the assembly line to precision tolerances, as a show of technical force by Chevrolet. All of them will be collector's items."

The magazine's History of 0–60 article said a 1974 pre-production Cosworth Vega's time of 7.7 seconds was the fastest that year. Testing a 1975 model, the magazine said: "The outstanding feature of the Cosworth Vega is its excellent balance. Roll-stiffness distribution is ideal, with little understeer entering a turn, and just the right amount of drift from the tail as you put your foot down to exit . . . Through the woods or down a mountain, the Cosworth is a feisty aggressor willing, if not altogether able to take on the world's best GT cars."

Motor Trend magazine's test of a 1975 version said it "goes like the proverbial bat out of Carlsburg Caverns [...] At moderate speeds, the car is as close to neutral handling as any American car I have ever driven..."

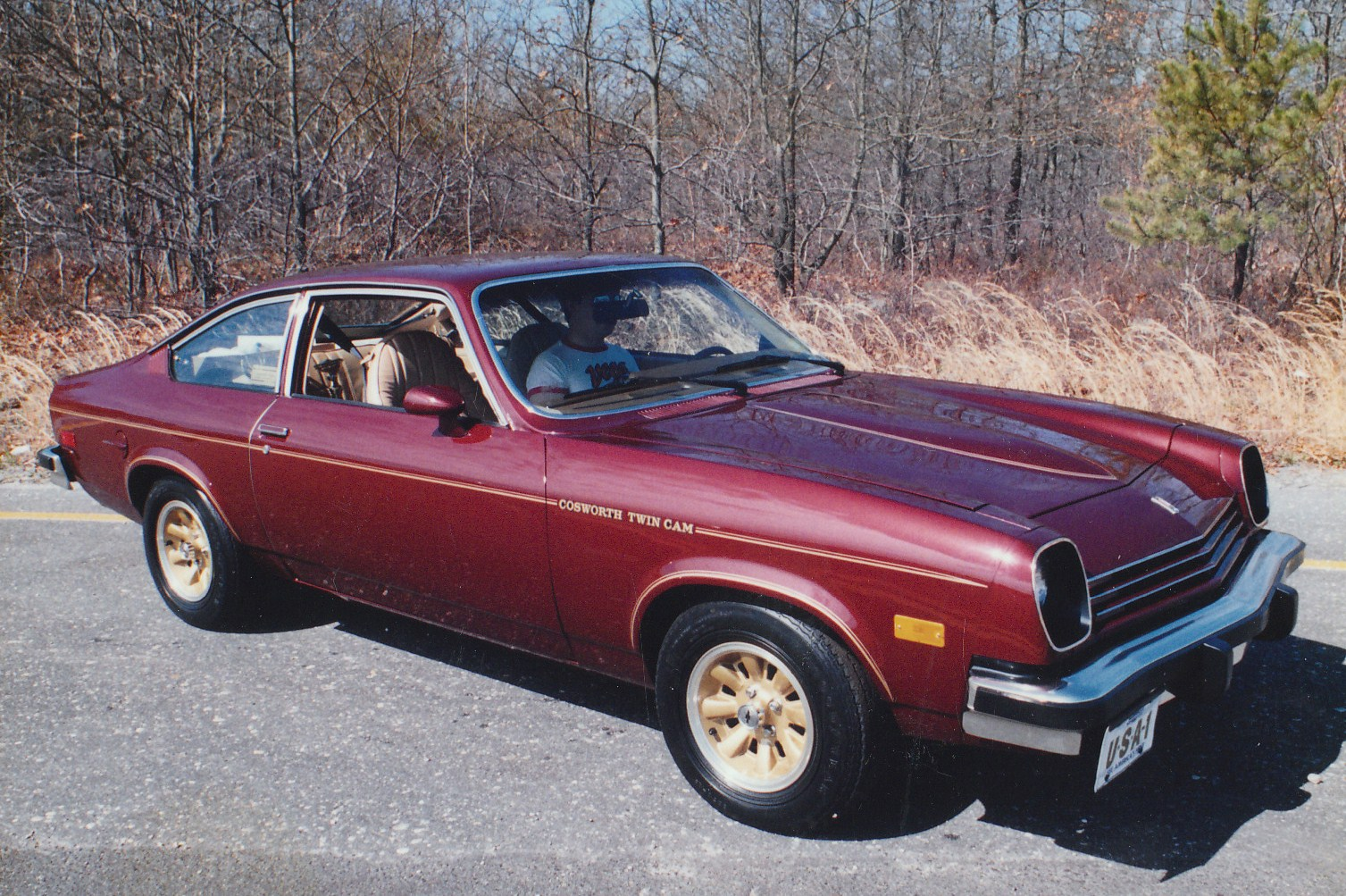
1976 Cosworth Vega

The Road & Track test of a 1976 model said: "The Cosworth Vega's handling is very good [...] All the drivers agreed that it is a far better handling car than those Vega derivatives such as the Monza that have been fitted out with V6 or V8 engines [...] We can't resist saying that with the Cosworth Vega engine, the Vega now runs the way it should have run all the time—easy, smooth, good response, good handling: a nice balance between performance and economy. Sweet as it is however, the Cosworth Vega is still way down the excitement ladder from what it would be with another 30 or 40 bhp. Then it would really be something."

Road Test magazine, in its 1976 "Supercoupe Shootout"—Alfa vs. Mazda vs. Lancia vs. Saab vs. Cosworth Vega—said: "The results are in Figure 2. Read 'em and weep, all you foreign-is-better nuts, because right there at the top, and by a long way at that, is the Cosworth Vega. It had the fastest 0-60 time, the fastest quarter-mile time, and tied with the Saab for the shortest braking distance". "The Cosworth is American, and a collector's item, and it came close, damn close to winning the whole thing."

Car and Driver chose the Cosworth Vega as one of the "10 Best Collectible Cars" in its fourth annual Ten Best issue, saying: "We're talking about historical significance here."

== See also ==
- Cosworth road engines
