= Silicone grease =

Waterproof grease made by combining a silicone oil with a thickener

Silicone grease, sometimes called dielectric grease, is a waterproof grease made by combining a silicone oil with a thickener. Most commonly, the silicone oil is polydimethylsiloxane (PDMS) and the thickener is amorphous fumed silica. Using this formulation, silicone grease is a translucent white viscous paste, with exact properties dependent on the type and proportion of the components. More specialized silicone greases are made from fluorinated silicones or, for low-temperature applications, PDMS containing some phenyl substituents in place of methyl groups. Other thickeners may be used, including stearates and powdered polytetrafluorethylene (PTFE). Greases formulated from silicone oils with silica thickener are sometimes referred to as silicone paste to distinguish them from silicone grease made with silicone oil and a soap thickener.

== Applications ==
=== Industrial use ===
Silicone grease is commonly used for lubricating and preserving many types of rubber parts, such as O-rings, without swelling or softening the rubber, but is contraindicated for silicone rubber due to those same factors. It functions well as a corrosion inhibitor and lubricant on non-metal-metal contact areas.

Silicone grease is soluble in organic solvents such as toluene, xylene, mineral spirits, and chlorinated hydrocarbons. It is insoluble in methanol, ethanol, and water.

Thermal grease often consists of a silicone-grease base, along with added thermally conductive fillers. It is used for heat-transfer abilities, rather than friction reduction.

Pure silicone grease is widely used by the plumbing industry in faucets and seals, as well as in dental equipment. This is because it is not an ingestion hazard. Electrical utilities use silicone grease to lubricate separable elbows on lines that must endure high temperatures. Silicone greases generally have an operating temperature range of approximately −40 to 200 °C (−40 to 392 °F) with some high-temperature versions extending this range slightly.

=== Chemical laboratories ===
Silicone grease is widely used as a temporary sealant and a lubricant for interconnecting ground glass joints, as is typically used in laboratory glassware. Although silicones are normally assumed to be chemically inert, several historically significant compounds have resulted from unintended reactions with silicones. The first salts of crown ethers (OSi(CH_{3})_{2})_{n} (n = 6, 7) were produced by reactions of organolithium and organopotassium compounds with silicone greases or the serendipitous reaction of stannanetriol with silicone grease to afford a cage-like compound having three Sn−O−Si−O−Sn linkages in the molecule.

Lubrication of an apparatus with silicone grease may result in the reaction mixture being contaminated with the grease. The impurity may be carried through purification by chromatography in undesirable amounts. In NMR spectroscopy, the methyl groups in polydimethylsiloxane display ^{1}H and ^{13}C chemical shifts similar to trimethylsilane (TMS), the reference compound for those forms of NMR spectroscopy. As with TMS, the signal is a singlet. In ^{1}H NMR, silicone grease appears at a singlet at δ = 0.07 ppm in CDCl_{3}, 0.09 in CD_{3}CN, 0.29 in C_{6}D_{6}, and −0.06 ppm in (CD_{3})_{2}SO. In ^{13}C NMR, it appears at δ = 1.19 ppm in CDCl_{3} and 1.38 ppm in C_{6}D_{6}. Tables of impurities commonly found in NMR spectroscopy have been prepared, and such tables include silicone grease.

=== Consumer products ===
Silicone-based lubricants are often used by consumers in applications where other common consumer lubricants, such as petroleum jelly, would damage certain products, such as latex rubber and gaskets on dry-suits. It can be used to lubricate fountain pen filling mechanisms and threads. Another common use is to lubricate keyboard stabilizer wires to reduce rattle.

=== Electrical use (dielectric grease) ===
Silicone greases are electrically insulating and are often applied to electrical connectors, particularly those containing rubber gaskets, as a means of sealing and protecting the connector. In this context, they are often referred to as dielectric grease.

A common use of this type is in the high-voltage connection associated with gasoline-engine spark plugs, where grease is applied to the rubber boot of the plug wire or the ignition coil to help it slide onto the ceramic insulator of the plug, to seal the rubber boot, and to prevent the rubber's adhesion to the ceramic. Such greases are formulated to withstand the high temperature generally associated with the areas in which spark plugs are located, and can be applied to contacts as well (because the contact pressure is sufficient to penetrate the grease film). Doing so on such high-pressure contact surfaces between different metals has the further advantage of sealing the contact area against electrolytes that might cause rapid deterioration of the metals by galvanic corrosion.

Silicone grease can decompose to form an insulating layer at or next to switch contacts that experience arcing, and contamination can cause the contacts to prematurely fail.

=== SCUBA diving ===
Silicone greases, of formulas qualified for such use, are often used for lubrication in the SCUBA industry, e.g., for lubricating components of gas pressure regulation and delivery equipment such as regulators, 'O' rings and couplings.

Some divers may use high PO_{2} 'enriched' gas mixes containing more than the usual ~21% of oxygen present in air as one of the ways to reduce the risk of decompression sickness, "the bends", on certain types of dive. Also, oxygen equipment between 60% and 100% is used to 'accelerate' decompression obligations. Silicone grease is used due to the risk that some non-silicone greases can spontaneously combust in the presence of high concentrations of oxygen.
