= Notchback =

Type of car design

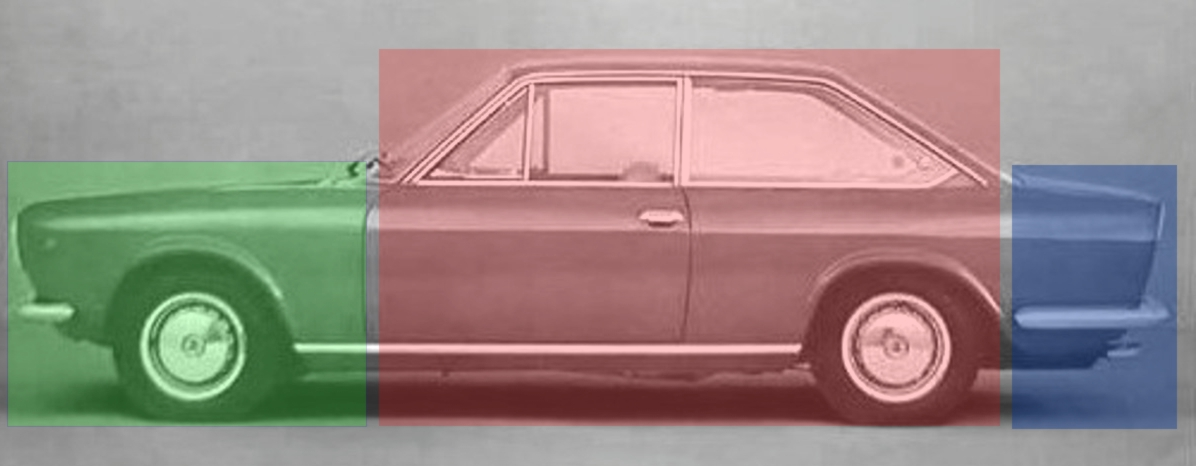
The three-box, notchback design of the Fiat 124 Coupé

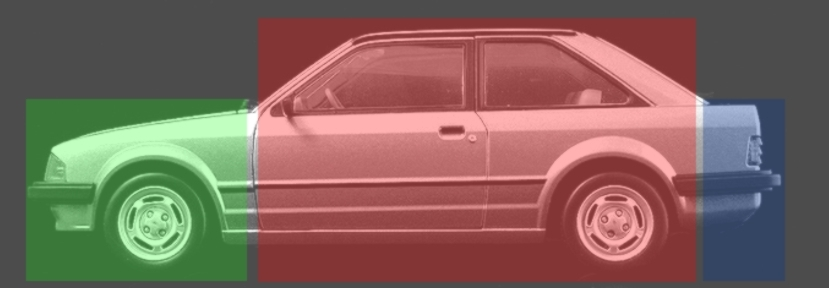
A three-box liftback in notchback form—with its vestigial third box, the European Ford Escort

A notchback is a car design with the rear section distinct from the passenger compartment and where the back of the passenger compartment is at an angle to the top of what is typically the rear baggage compartment. Notchback cars have "a trunk whose lid forms a distinct deck." In profile view, the body has a step down from the roof with a downward inclined passenger compartment's rear window to meet an almost horizontal trunk lid extending to the rear of the car.

The category may be characterized as having a three-box design where the trunk volume is less pronounced than the engine and passenger compartments.

Many models of sedans, coupés, or hatchbacks could be classified as notchbacks. However, the category has limited salience outside American car manufacturers, who distinguish the three-box models from other body styles in the same model range. For example, the Chevrolet Vega range included both a notchback coupe and a fastback coupe.

== North America ==
One of the first cars marketed as a notchback is the 1938 Cadillac Sixty Special.

In a major design change among U.S. automakers for the 1952 model year, a notchback version of the Nash Ambassador was introduced. This was in contrast to the previous fastback aerodynamic body shape that made the 1949 through 1950 Nash Ambassadors the "most streamlined form on the road." The new cars had a distinctive reverse slanting C-pillar and featured boxier styling that became a design trend.

In 1971, Chevrolet marketed the three-box sedan models of the Chevrolet Vega as a notchback to differentiate them from the fastback Vega models. For the 1973 model year, the car's name was changed to "Vega Notchback".

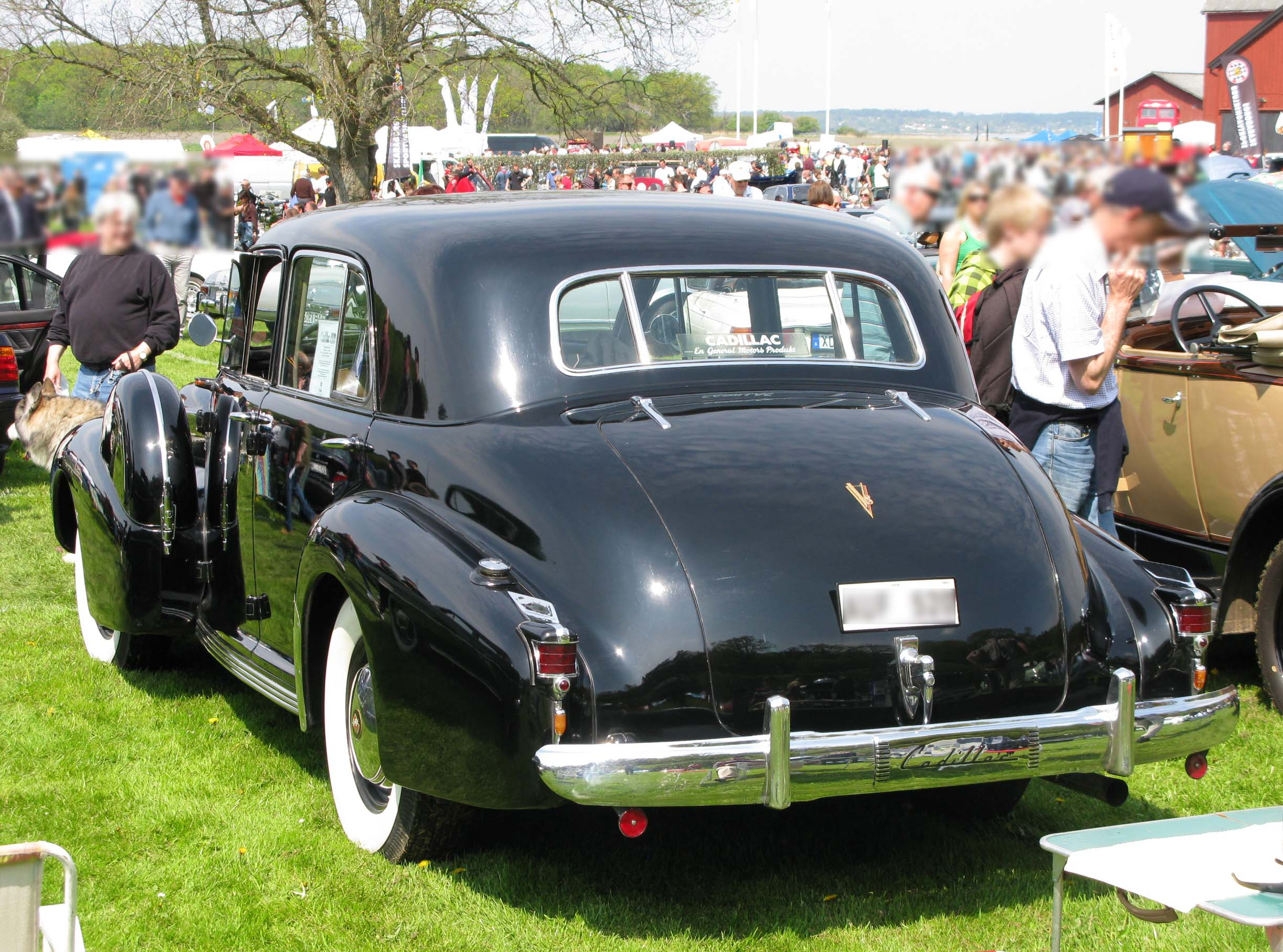
1939 Cadillac Series 60 Special

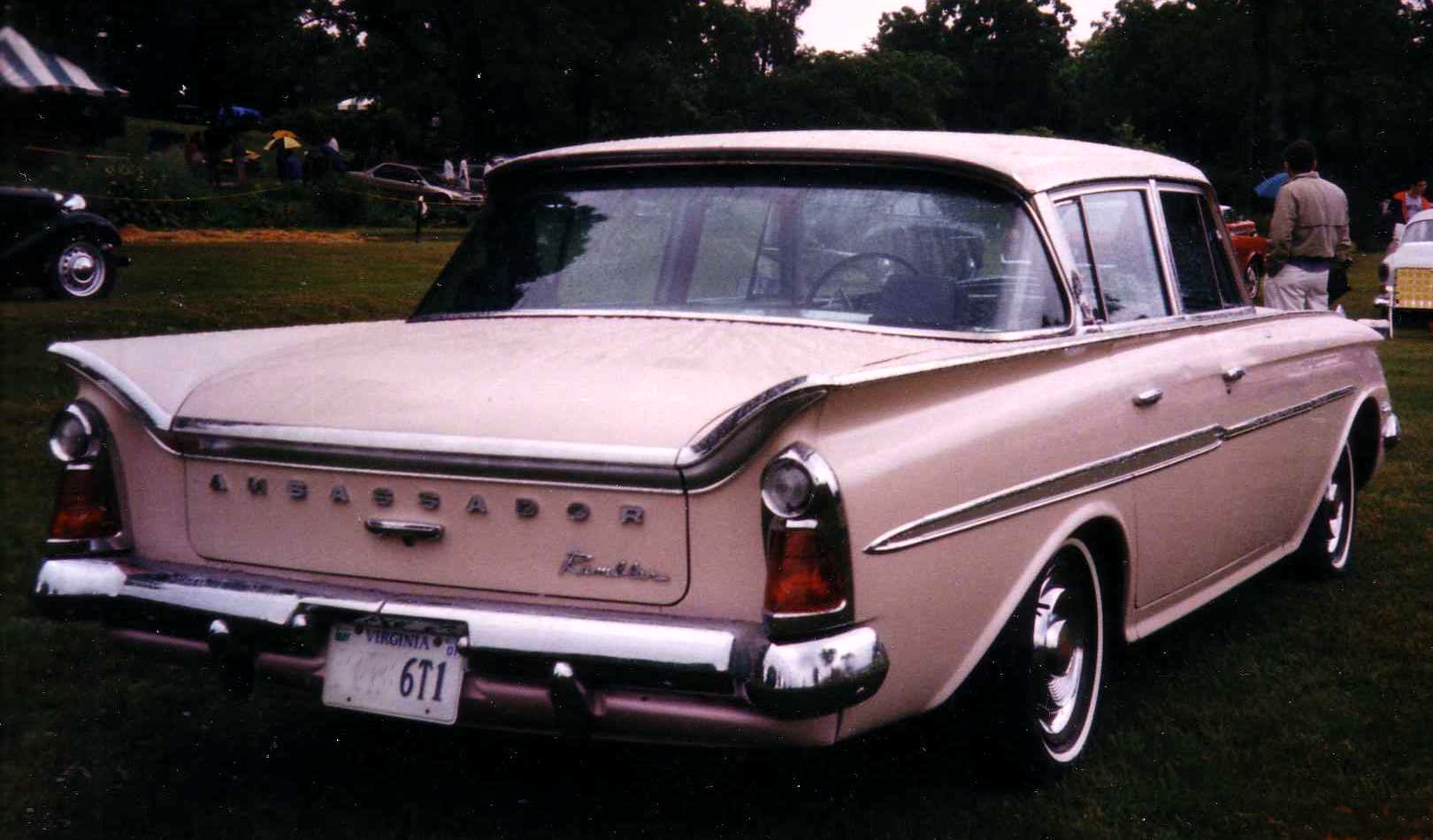
1961 Rambler Ambassador sedan

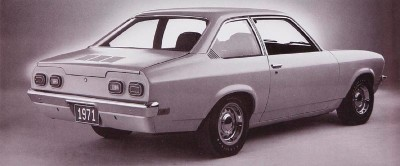
1971 Chevrolet Vega notchback

== English-speaking countries ==
While many car models have notchback characteristics, the category is largely unused outside North America, with their body style being described using other terms. For example, a three-box sedan is more generally known as a "saloon" in British English. "Notchback" has appeared in a few British English publications; however, it is not a term that is used in common parlance in Britain.

== See also ==
- Car body style
- Ponton Styling
