= High energy ignition =

Electronic ignition system

High energy ignition, also known as H.E.I., is an electronic ignition system designed by the Delco-Remy Division of General Motors. It was used on all GM vehicles, at least in the North American market, from 1975 through the mid-1980s. The system is an electronic system that requires no scheduled maintenance, provides up to 35,000 volts to fire the spark plugs and increase spark plug life, especially when unleaded fuel is used. The HEI system has 40% more voltage output and 85% higher energy level than conventional breaker point systems to fire lean fuel mixtures even under adverse conditions.

There were many design variations over the years, and provisions for computer controls were added for some applications starting in the late 1970s. A predecessor system called "Unitized Ignition" was optional on 1972 and 1973 Pontiacs.

Most—but not all—HEI systems have the ignition coil mounted in the distributor cap. A control module and magnetic pickup are mounted in the distributor, in place of a conventional ignition system's breaker points and condenser.

== Description ==
The HEl system was developed as an integrated package that combines the distributor, magnetic pick-up, ignition coil and electronic module into one package. By doing this, these components are well protected from physical and environmental abuses and the number of electrical connections are reduced.

There are some models that use a remotely mounted coil. This coil is constructed the same as the integral coil with the exception of a mounting bracket and a terminal for the connection of a high tension lead. These models are used on engines where additional clearance was needed.

The size of the distributor was increased due to the wide spacing that must exist between the' distributor cap Inserts to prevent high voltage arc-over. A wider spacing was also needed between the cap, inserts and the distributor housing to prevent arc-over and leakage to ground.

The higher voltage output of the HEI system required new insulation materials. To prevent ignition failure due to carbon tracking, a special material is used for the distributor cap and rotor. It is a thermoplastic, injection-molded, glass-reinforced polyester. This material provided the dielectric and insulation properties needed and also prevented carbon tracking.

The high voltage terminals used in the distributor cap are similar in appearance to spark plug terminals. These connections provide easier attachment and better sealing of the connections. Latches are used to ensure proper connections of the plug wires to the cap and prevent any loosening or movement which might reduce the moisture of the connection. The spark plug wires are a carbon-impregnated cord conductor encased in an 8 millimeter diameter silicone jacket. Silicone wiring will withstand very high temperature and is an excellent insulator for higher voltages.

== Control modules ==
There are four basic types of HEI control modules: four-, five-, seven-, and eight-pin. The four-pin module was used on carbureted engines and uses conventional mechanical timing controls (vacuum and centrifugal advance mechanisms). The five-pin module was introduced in 1978 and was an early attempt at electronic timing control; it contains a provision for connecting a knock sensor. The seven- and eight-pin modules are used on early computer-controlled engines in conjunction with fixed-timing distributors, as the computer controls the ignition timing.

== Pick-up Coils ==
The pick-up coil is not serviced separately but as an assembly with the bottom plate, pole piece and permanent magnet. This assembly, called the "pole piece and plate" in the parts book, should not be disassembled because the pole piece is centered around the axis of the distributor during production. This sets the clearance between the teeth of the pole piece and timer core.

There are seven different pole pieces and plate assemblies available. The correct part number of the pole piece and plate assembly for a particular vehicle should be determined from the appropriate parts book. The part number of a pole piece and plate assembly can be determined by visual inspection by the colored ties or connectors ant he number of teeth on the timer core and pole piece. The following is a list of pole piece and plate assemblies by pick-up coil color code.

- Blue tie or black connector body: 1876210 (V-8), 1891209 (V-6), 1880020 (L-4)
- Yellow tie or yellow connector body: 1875981 (V-8), 1880040 (L-6), 1892175 (L-4)
- Clear tie or clear connector body: 1876495 (V-8)
- Yellow connector: 1894237 V-6 (200 CID)
- Black connector: 1893894 V-6 even fire (196, 231 CID)

== Ignition Coil ==
In the oil filled ignition coil used with conventional ignition systems, the primary winding is wrapped around the secondary winding and the secondary winding is wrapped around the iron core. The HEI coil has the secondary winding wrapped around the primary winding and the primary winding is wrapped around the iron core. The HEI coil is not oil filled; instead, the windings are covered in an epoxy compound for protection against moisture and arc-over within the coil.

Primary current is increased by reducing the length of wire used in the primary windings, thus reducing resistance.

Inductance values of the primary and secondary winding are also different in the HEI coil. Increased secondary inductance provide a higher voltage and a longer spark duration than the conventional system.

== Upgrading ==
HEI distributors are a popular swap on older GM cars originally equipped with points and condenser type ignition systems. The HEI system produces a more powerful spark, which allows for a wider spark plug gap for surer ignition of a fuel/air mix that may not be optimal. The HEI setup has also become a popular swap into non-GM vehicles.
