= Secondary air injection =

Vehicle emissions control strategy

Secondary air injection (commonly known as air injection) is a vehicle emissions control strategy introduced in 1966, wherein fresh air is injected into the exhaust stream to allow for a fuller secondary combustion of exhaust gases.

== Development ==
The mechanism by which exhaust emissions are controlled depends on the method of injection and the point at which air enters the exhaust system, and has varied during the course of the development of the technology.

The first systems injected air very close to the engine, either in the cylinder head's exhaust ports or in the exhaust manifold. These systems provided oxygen to oxidize (burn) unburned and partially burned fuel in the exhaust before its ejection from the tailpipe. There was significant unburned and partially burned fuel in the exhaust of 1960s and early 1970s vehicles, and so secondary air injection significantly reduced tailpipe emissions. However, the extra heat of recombustion, particularly with an excessively rich exhaust caused by misfiring or a maladjusted carburetor, tended to damage exhaust valves and could even be seen to cause the exhaust manifold to incandesce.

As emission control strategies grew more sophisticated and effective, the amount of unburned and partially burned fuel in the exhaust stream shrank, and particularly when the catalytic converter was introduced, the function of secondary air injection shifted. Rather than being a primary emission control device, the secondary air injection system was adapted to support the efficient function of the catalytic converter. The original air injection point became known as the upstream injection point. When the catalytic converter is cold, air injected at the upstream point burns with the deliberately rich exhaust so as to bring the catalyst up to operating temperature quickly. Once the catalyst is warm, air is injected to the downstream location — the catalytic converter itself — to assist with catalysis of unburned hydrocarbons.

== Methods of implementation ==
=== Pumped air injection ===
Pumped air injection systems use a vane pump called the air pump, AIR pump, or colloquially "smog pump" turned by the engine via a belt or electric motor. The pump's air intake is filtered by a rotating screen or the vehicle air filter to exclude dirt particles large enough to damage the system. Air is delivered under light pressure to the injection point(s). A check valve prevents exhaust forcing its way back through the air injection system, which would damage the pump and other components.

Carbureted engines' exhaust raw fuel content tends to spike when the driver suddenly releases the throttle. To prevent the startling and potentially damaging effects of the explosive combustion of this raw fuel, a diverter valve is used. This valve senses the sharp increase in the intake manifold vacuum resulting from the sudden closure of the throttle, and diverts the air pump's outlet to atmosphere. Usually this diverted air is routed to the engine air cleaner or to a separate silencer to muffle objectionable pump noise.

=== Aspirated air injection ===
Air injection can also be achieved by taking advantage of the negative pressure pulses in the exhaust system at engine idle. A sensitive reed valve assembly called the aspirator valve is placed in the air injection pumping, which draws its air directly from the clean side of the air filter. During engine idle, brief but periodic negative pressure pulses in the exhaust system draw air through the aspirator valve and into the exhaust stream at the catalytic converter. This system, marketed as Pulse Air, was used by American Motors, Chrysler, and other manufacturers beginning in the 1970s. The aspirator provided advantages in cost, weight, packaging, and simplicity compared to the pump. Also, since there is no pump requiring engine power, parasitic losses associated with the pump are eliminated. However, the aspirator functions only at idle and so admits significantly less air within a significantly narrower range of engine speeds compared to a pump. This system is still used on modern motorcycle engines, e.g. the Yamaha AIS (Air Injection System).

== See also ==
- Exhaust gas recirculation
