= Detroit Line =

Detroit Line may refer to the following rail lines:

- Detroit Line (Conrail) in and near Detroit
- Detroit Line (Norfolk Southern), Detroit to Toledo
- Chicago–Detroit Line, a name for Amtrak's Michigan Line, which runs from Porter, Indiana, to Dearborn, Michigan
