= Piquette Avenue Industrial Historic District =

Historic district in Michigan, United States

- U.S. National Register of Historic Places
- U.S. Historic district
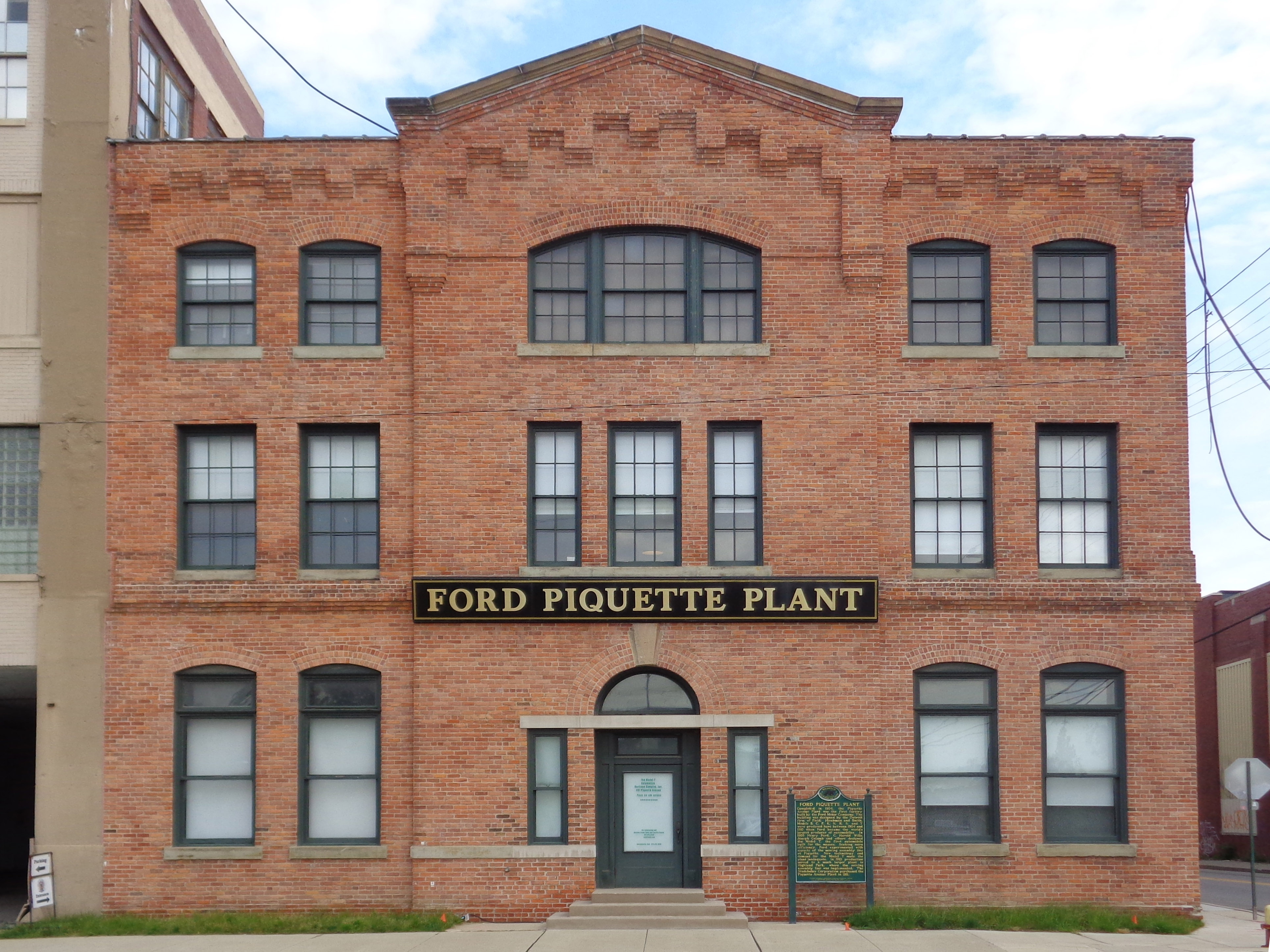
- Ford Piquette Avenue Plant is a notable building in the district.
- Interactive map
- Location: Detroit, Michigan, U.S.
- Coordinates: 42°22′5″N 83°3′57″W
- Built: 1904
- Architect: Field, Hinchman and Smith; Smith, Hinchman and Grylls, et al.
- Architectural style: Late Victorian, Late 19th And Early 20th Century American Movements
- NRHP reference No.: 04000601
- Added to NRHP: June 15, 2004

The Piquette Avenue Industrial Historic District is a historic district located along Piquette Street in Detroit, Michigan, from Woodward Avenue on the west to Hastings Street on the east. The district extends approximately one block south of Piquette to Harper, and one block north to the Grand Trunk Western Railroad Line. It was listed on the National Register of Historic Places in 2004.

The area along Piquette was an important center for automobile production in the early 20th century. Ford Motor Company, Studebaker, Cadillac, Dodge, and Regal Motor Car had plants in the area, as well as suppliers such as Fisher Body. In 1910, the two largest automobile producers in the world, Studebaker and Ford, were located next door to each other on Piquette. Although the area is largely empty and derelict now, as recently as the 1950s there were 50,000 workers employed in plants in the district.

== General history ==
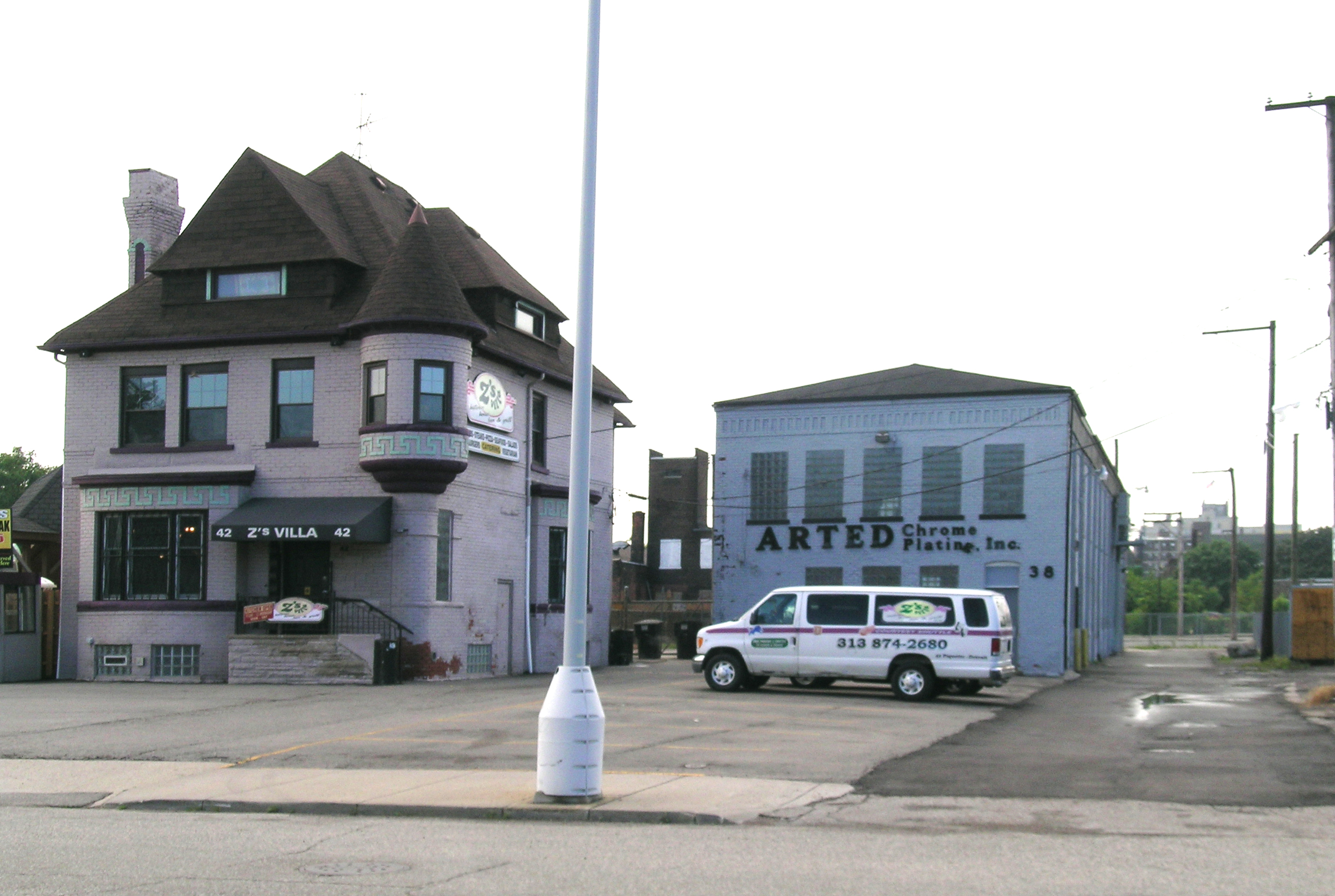
Two smaller buildings on Piquette Avenue near Woodward in the Historic District.

Major railroad infrastructure, known as the Milwaukee Junction, was built in the 1890s to facilitate industrial expansion in the city of Detroit. The heart of Milwaukee Junction was Piquette Avenue, although industrial plants were built in this area on both sides of Woodward Avenue, with the automotive industry prominently involved. The area west of Woodward and south of the railroad tracks is the New Amsterdam Historic District, while a portion of the area east of Woodward is now the Piquette Avenue Industrial Historic District.

== Buildings ==
=== Autocar Service Building (234 Piquette) ===
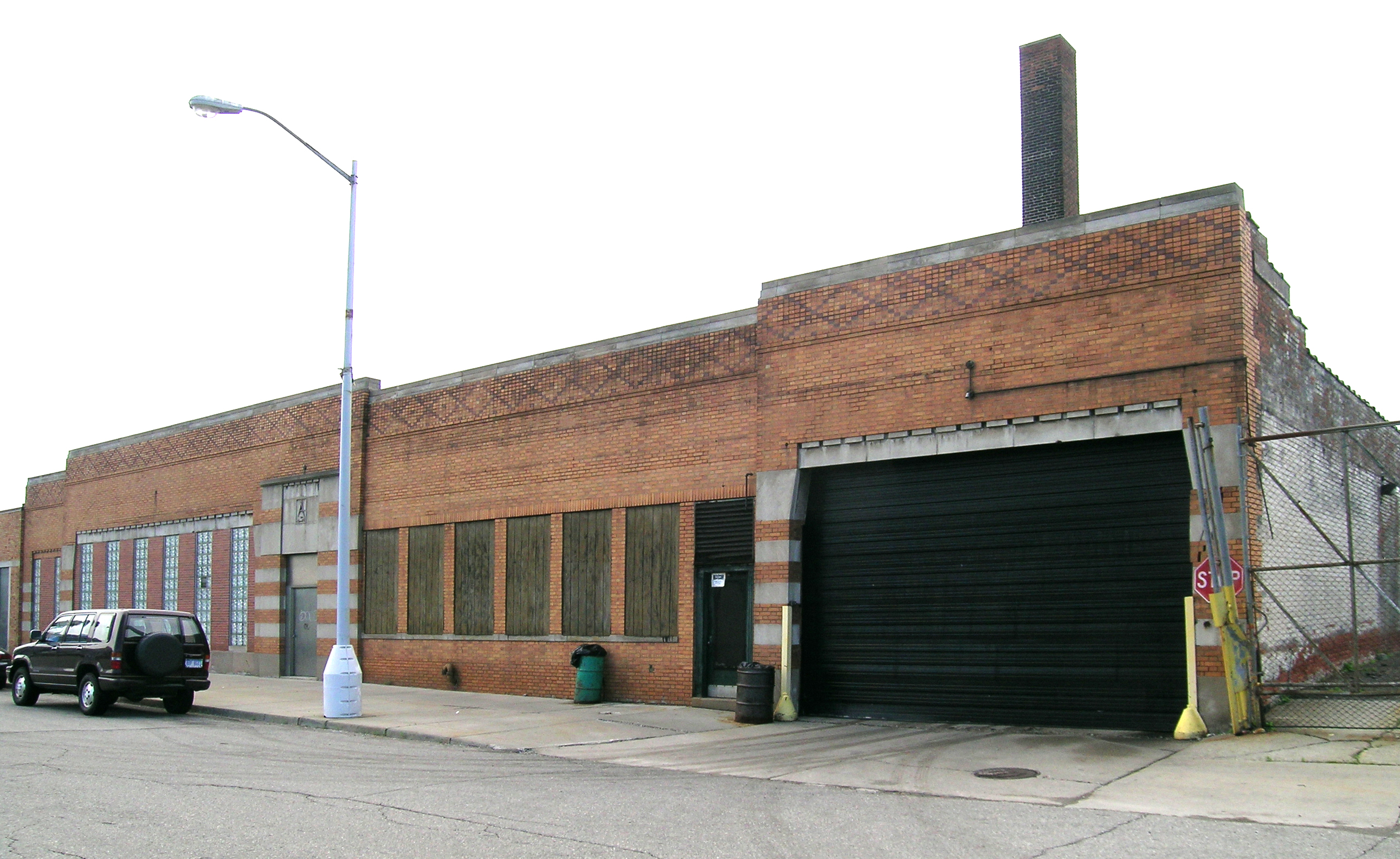
Autocar Service Building, Piquette and Brush.

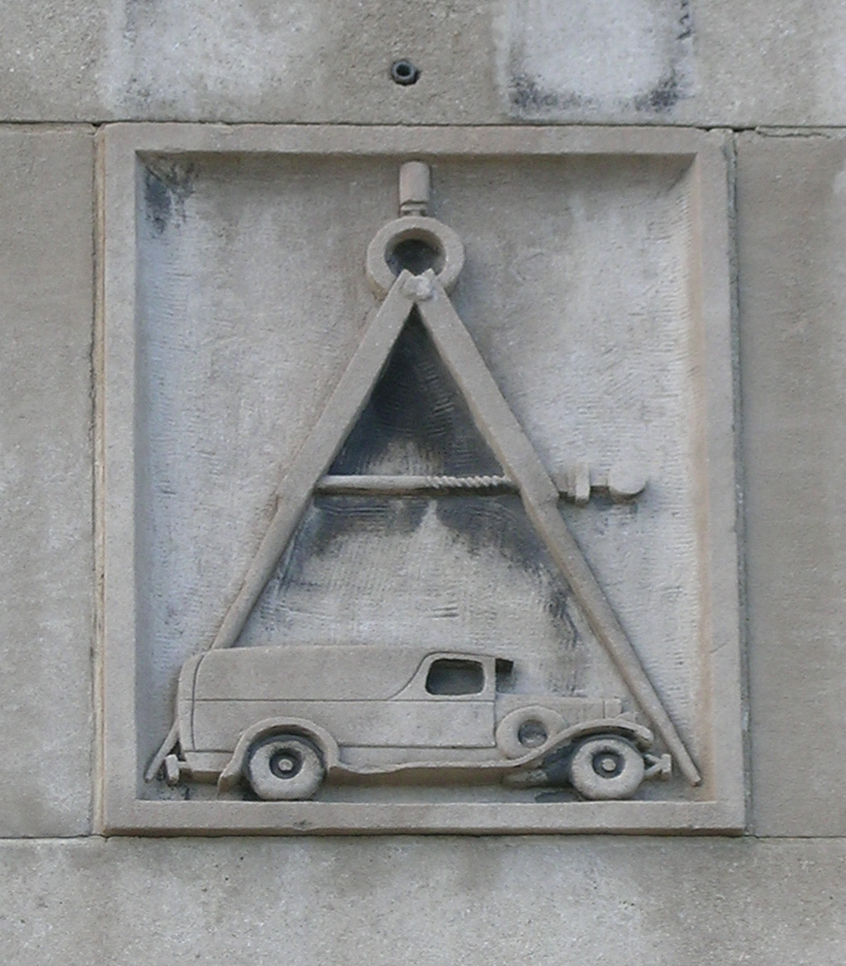
Logo above front door, Autocar Service Building.

The Autocar Service Building is located on the southwest corner of Piquette and Brush.

In April 2024, Detroit Public Media announced that it had purchased the building to redevelop as its new headquarters. The building was previously owned by and used as a storage facility by the city's parks and recreation department, although there were plans to repurpose it for the Architectural Salvage Warehouse of Detroit.

=== E-M-F/Studebaker Plant (201 - 285 Piquette) ===
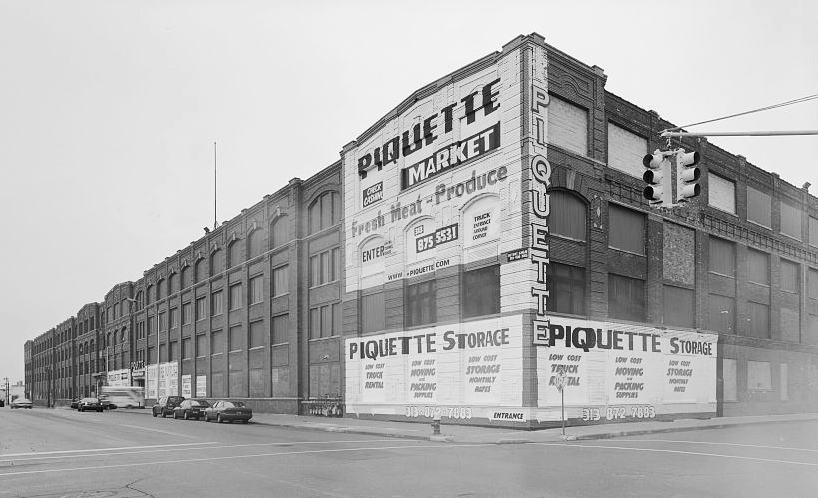
Studebaker Plant in 2003

The Studebaker Plant was located on the north side of Piquette, between Brush and John R. The building first housed Wayne Automotive in 1906. In 1908, Wayne merged with Northern Motor Car to form the E-M-F Company. The owners of E-M-F formed a manufacturing and distribution partnership with Studebaker, and eventually Studebaker took control of E-M-F (and the plant) in 1910. Studebaker continued to manufacture automobiles in the plant until 1925. After Studebaker left the plant, Chrysler used it until the mid-1960s as a parts facility.

The building was used in part for warehousing after that, as well as home the Piquette Market, a meat wholesaler. The building was documented by the Historic American Engineering Record in 2003. In June 2005, the plant was completely destroyed in a fire. As of 2008, a shelter for homeless veterans was planned for the site.

When Studebaker began production of the two models of the Rockne, the larger "75" was produced in South Bend, beginning December 15, 1931; and the smaller "65" went into production at the old E-M-F plant on Piquette Avenue in Detroit, February 22, 1932. This Piquette Avenue plant was the same plant at which the 1927 and 1928 Erskine models had been built. Rockne's were also produced at Studebaker's Walkerville, Ontario plant.

The 1933 Rockne line was reduced to one line, the "10". The Rockne "10" was an update of the "65". When Studebaker went into receivership on March 18, 1933, it was decided to move production of the Rockne to the Studebaker plant in South Bend. The Rockne "10" was built in South Bend from April through July, 1933.

=== Ford Piquette Avenue Plant (461 Piquette) ===
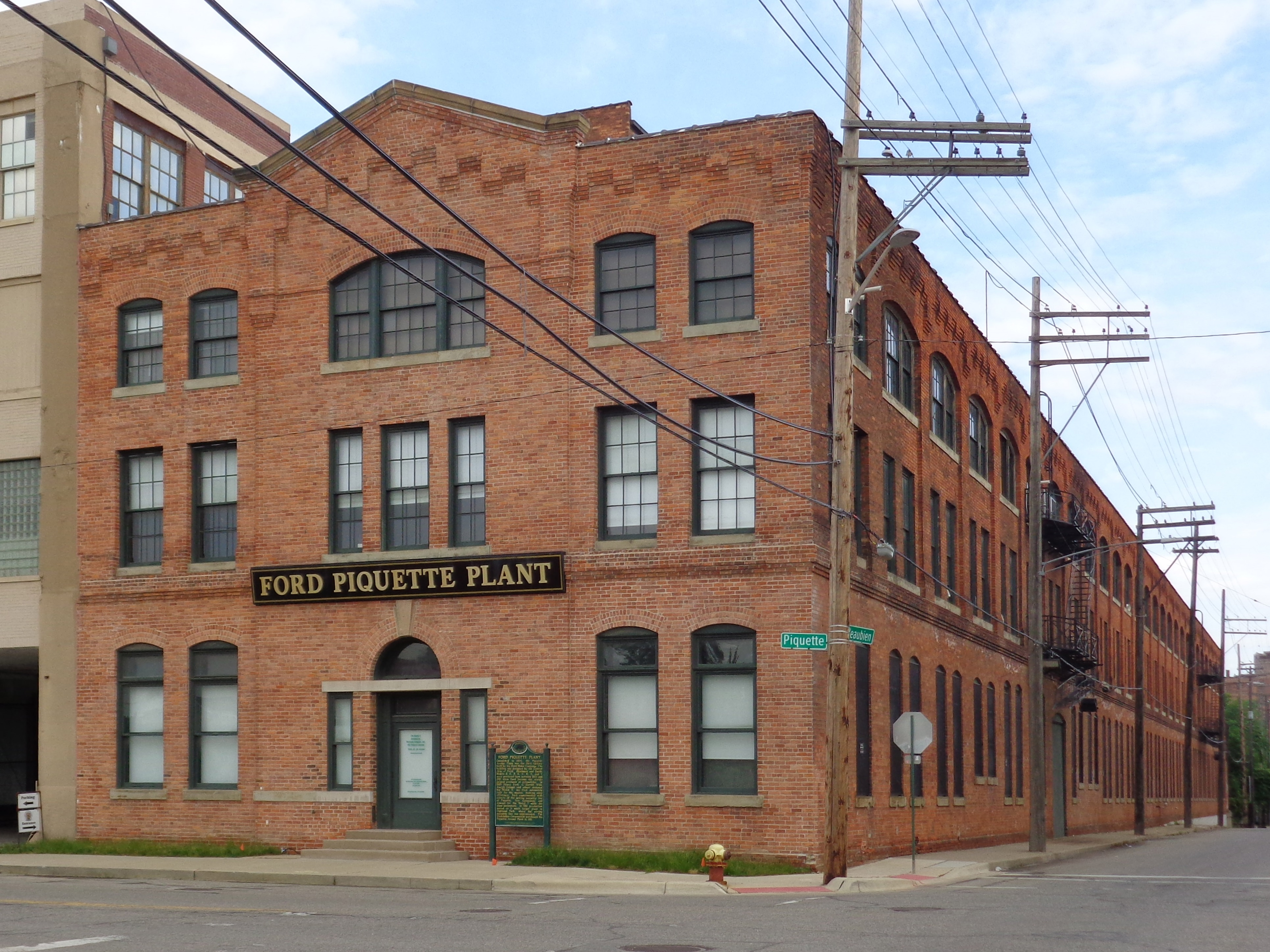
Piquette plant.

The Ford Piquette Avenue Plant is located at 461 Piquette, on the northwest corner of Piquette and Beaubien. It is a three-story mill-style building designed by Field, Hinchman, and Smith for Ford in 1904. The first Model Ts were built in this building. The building was designated a National Historic Landmark on February 17, 2006.

=== Fisher Body Plant 23 and 23B (601 Piquette) ===
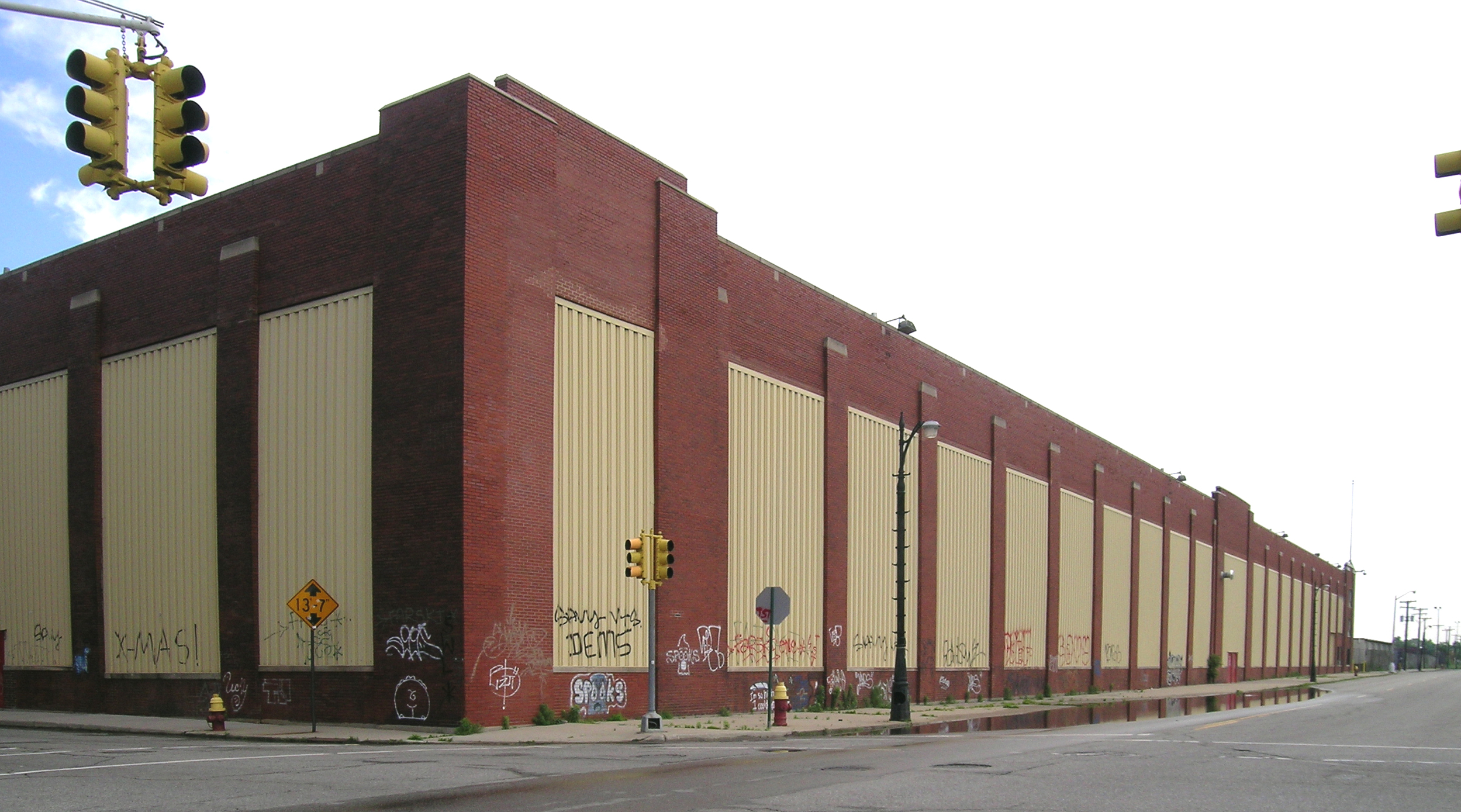
Fisher Body Plant 23, Piquette and Beaubien.

The Fisher Body Plant 23 is located on the northeast corner of Piquette and Beaubien and includes a single-story building (#23B) and a six-story building (#23). The six-story structure was designed by Albert Kahn, Architects and Engineers and constructed by H. G. Christman Co.

=== Fisher Body Plant 21 (700 Piquette) ===
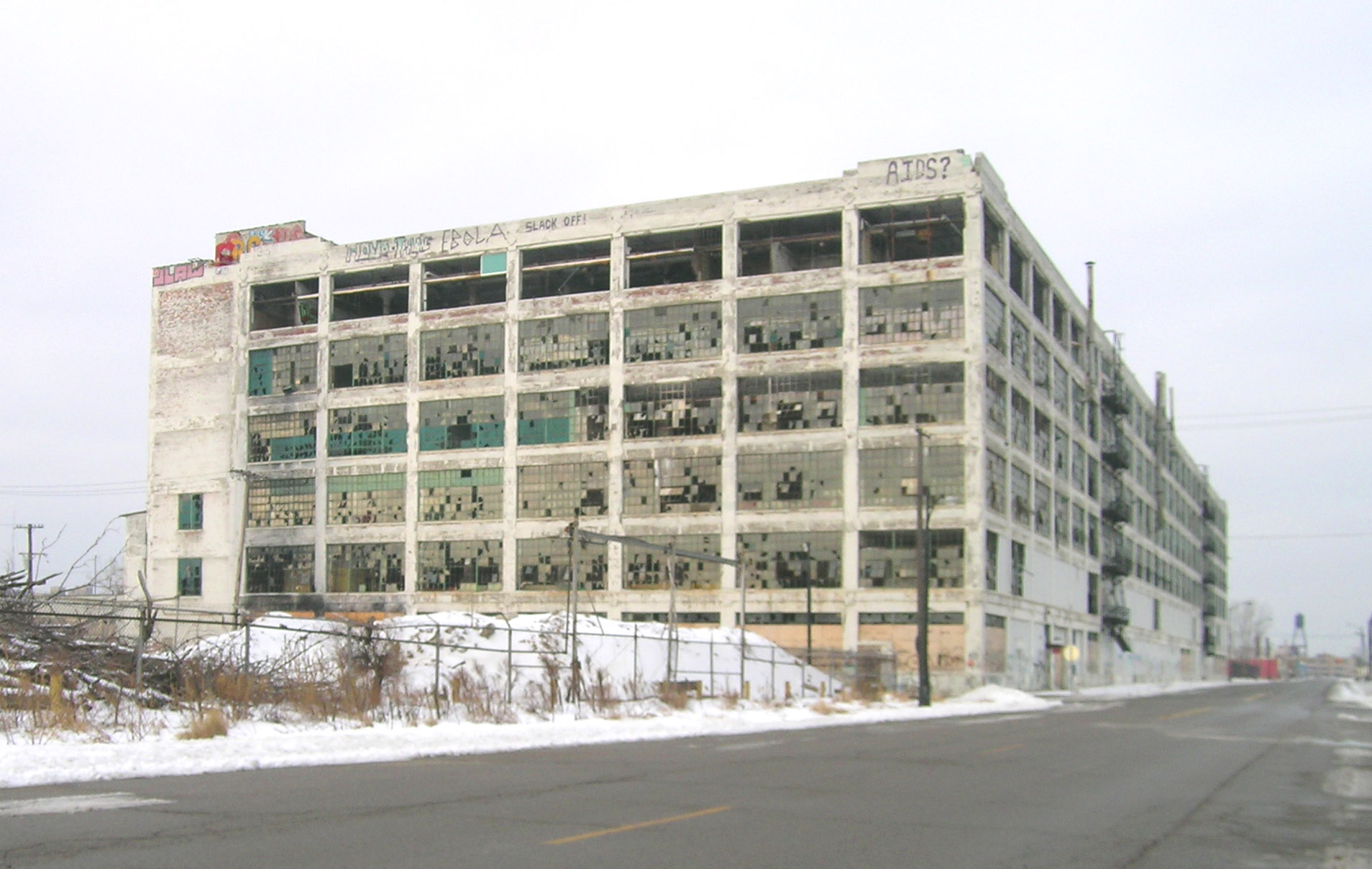
Fisher Body Plant 21, Piquette and St. Antoine.

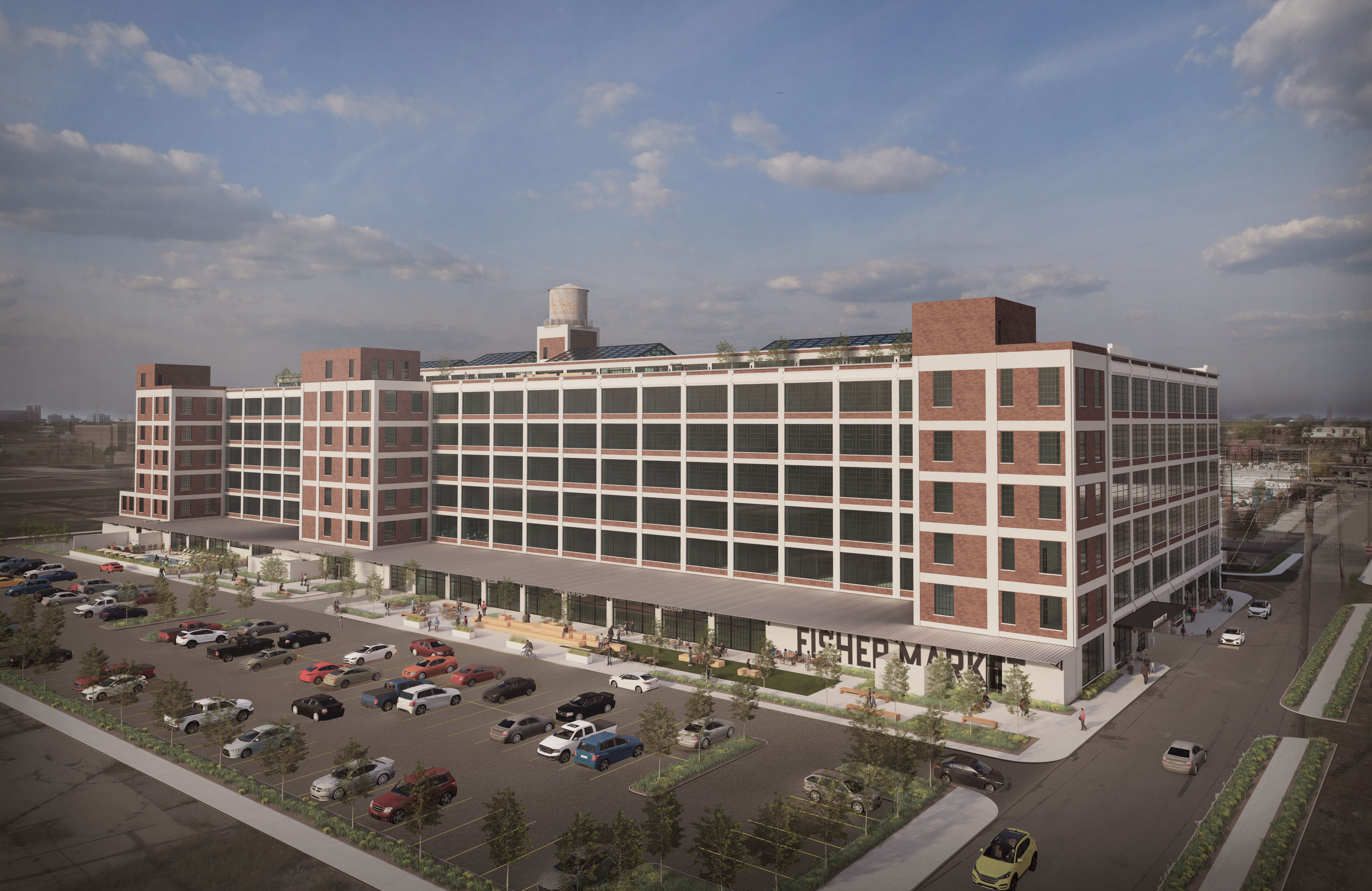
Fisher 21 Lofts Rendering, McIntosh Poris Architects.

The Fisher Body Plant 21 is located on the southeast corner of Piquette and St. Antoine. It was designed in 1921 by Smith, Hinchman & Grylls for Fisher Body, who manufactured Buick and Cadillac bodies in the plant until 1925. The plant is six stories tall, with a footprint of 200 feet (61 m) by 581 feet (177 m) and an interior area of 536,000 square feet (49,800 m^{2}). During the Great Depression, Fisher suspended production and the building was used as a soup kitchen and homeless shelter. The plant was used as an engineering design facility from 1930–1956; during World War II, the factory produced Lockheed P-80 Shooting Star Planes, Vought F4U Corsair Shipboard Fighters, and some assemblies for B-25 Mitchell bombers. After 1956, the plant was used to build Cadillac limousine bodies; GM closed the plant in 1984. After GM left, several paint companies used the building; it closed for good in 1994. In 1999, as a result of unpaid property taxes, the building became the property of the City of Detroit and was re-addressed as 6051 Hastings Street. The building was documented by the Historic American Engineering Record in 2003. In 2022, the City of Detroit mayor Mike Duggan announced plans to revive the building as Fisher 21 Lofts. Developed by Jackson Asset Management, Lewand Development, and Hosey Development, the McIntosh Poris Architects-designed project will have 433 rental apartments (at least 20% of which will be affordable housing for people earning less than 80% of the area median income) and 38,000 square feet of commercial space.
