= New Amsterdam Historic District =

Historic district in Michigan, United States

- U.S. National Register of Historic Places
- U.S. Historic district
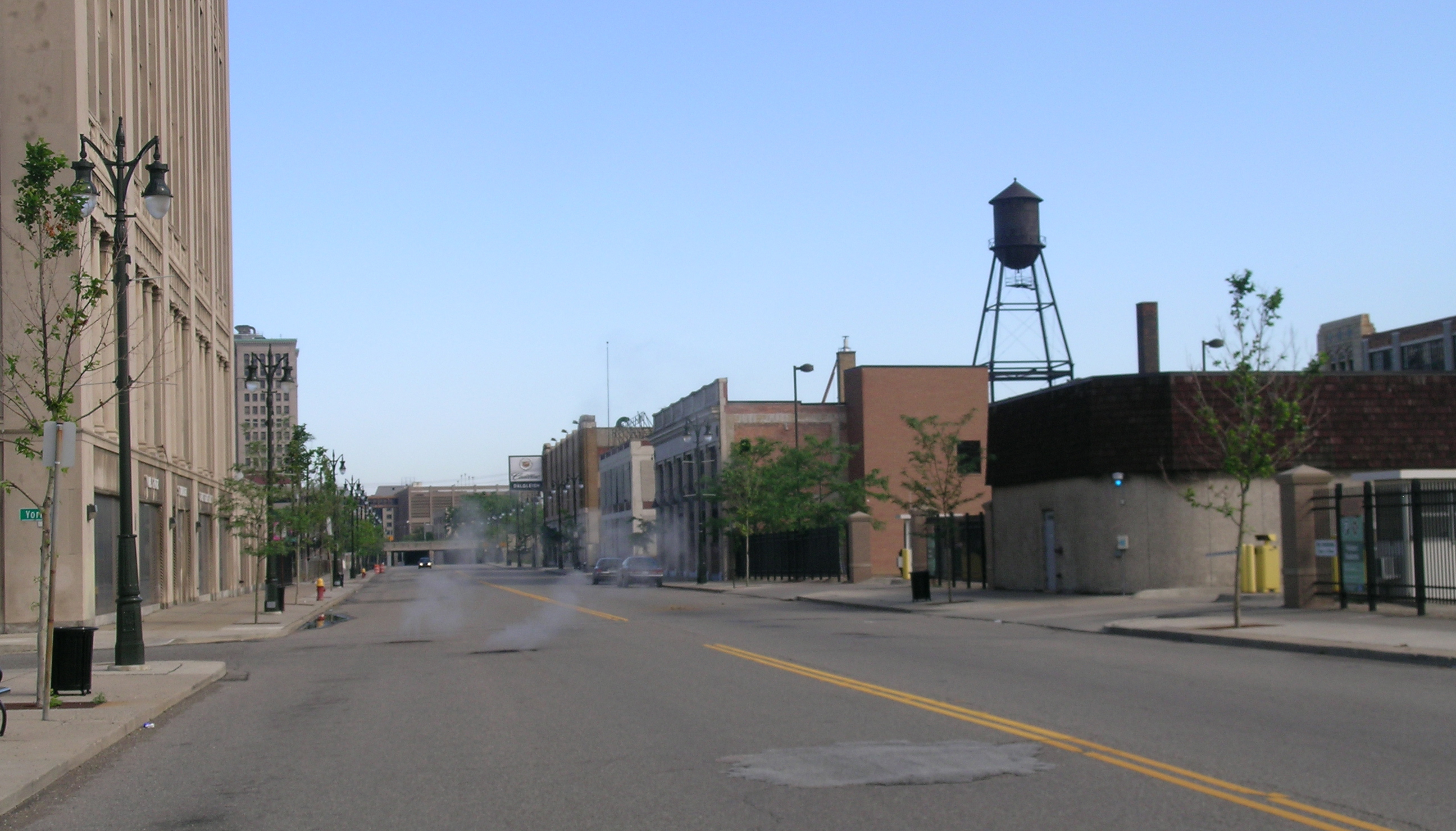
- Streetscape on Cass, taken from where 425 York once stood. 6001 Cass is to the left; 6050, 6110, and 6160 Cass line the street to the right. The rear of 41-47 Burroughs is at the extreme right
- Interactive map
- Location: Detroit, Michigan, U.S.
- Coordinates: 42°21′56″N 83°4′21″W
- Architect: Albert Kahn; et al.
- Architectural style: Late 19th And Early 20th Century American Movements, Late Victorian
- NRHP reference No.: 01000570
- Added to NRHP: May 30, 2001

The New Amsterdam Historic District is a historic district located in Detroit, Michigan. Buildings in this district are on or near three sequential east-west streets (Amsterdam, Burroughs, and York) on the two blocks between Woodward Avenue and Second Avenue. It was listed on the National Register of Historic Places in 2001.

== District definition ==
The New Amsterdam Historic District was recognized by both the National Register of Historic Places and the City of Detroit as a historic district in 2001. Specific buildings in the general area are included in the designation; these buildings are located at 435 and 450 Amsterdam Street, 41-47, and 440 Burroughs Street, 5911-5919 and 6050-6160 Cass Avenue, 6100-6200 Second Avenue, and 425 York Street. In addition, the city designation includes 6001 Cass Avenue.

== General history ==
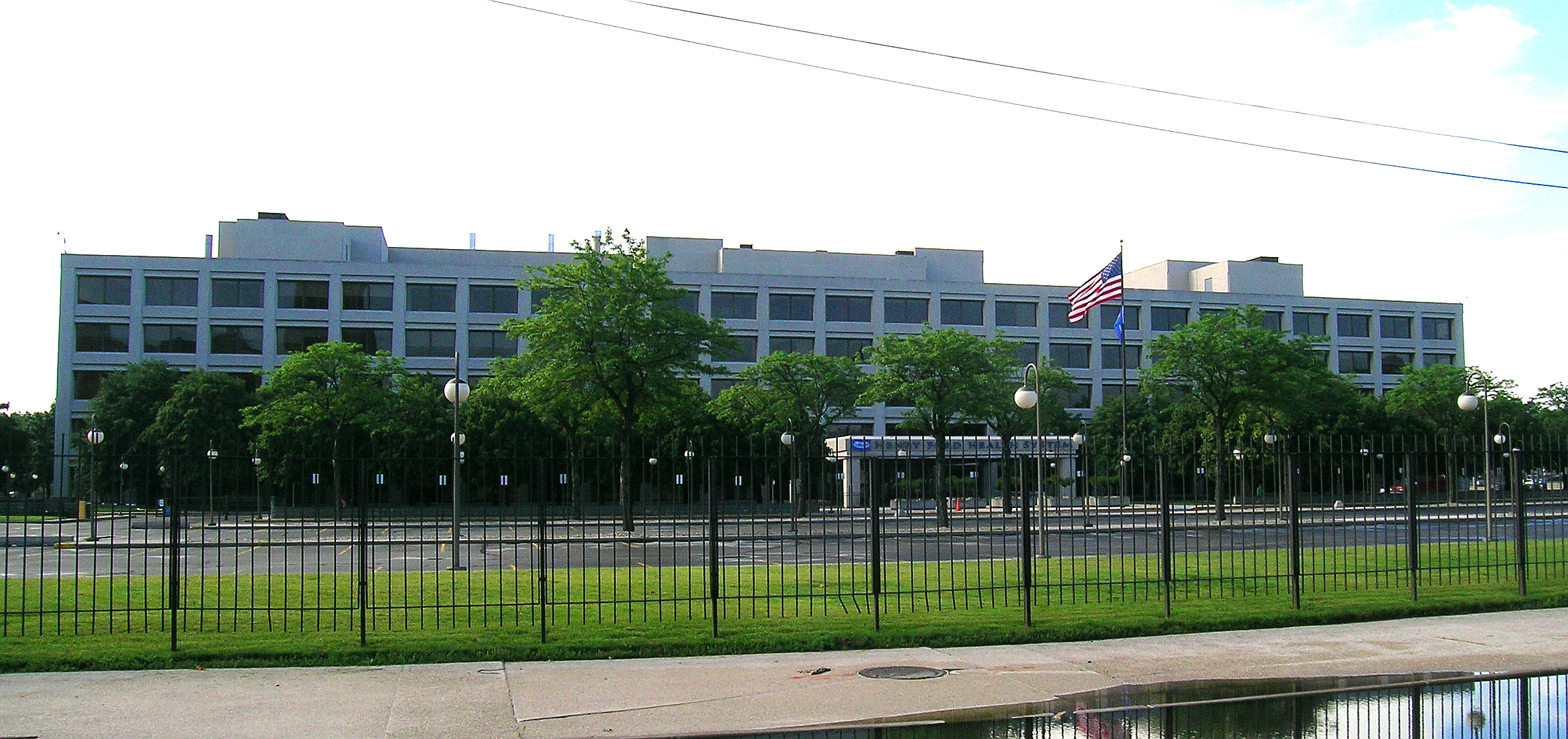
Burroughs Adding Machine, now the Henry Ford Health Headquarters

Major railroad infrastructure, known as the Milwaukee Junction, was built in the 1890s to facilitate industrial expansion in the city of Detroit. To take advantage of the rail line, industrial plants were built in this area on both sides of Woodward Avenue, with the automotive industry prominently involved. Part of this area east of Woodward is now the Piquette Avenue Industrial Historic District, while the area west of Woodward and south of the railroad tracks is the New Amsterdam Historic District. Some commercial buildings were also built in this area, particularly along Cass.

Although not part of the New Amsterdam Historic District, part of the early industrial character of the area was formed by the enormous Albert Kahn-designed Burroughs Adding Machine factory at Second and Burroughs, which is now the Henry Ford Health Systems administrative offices.

== Structures ==
The district features several historically significant buildings. Some of these are:

=== Unknown (435 Amsterdam Street) ===
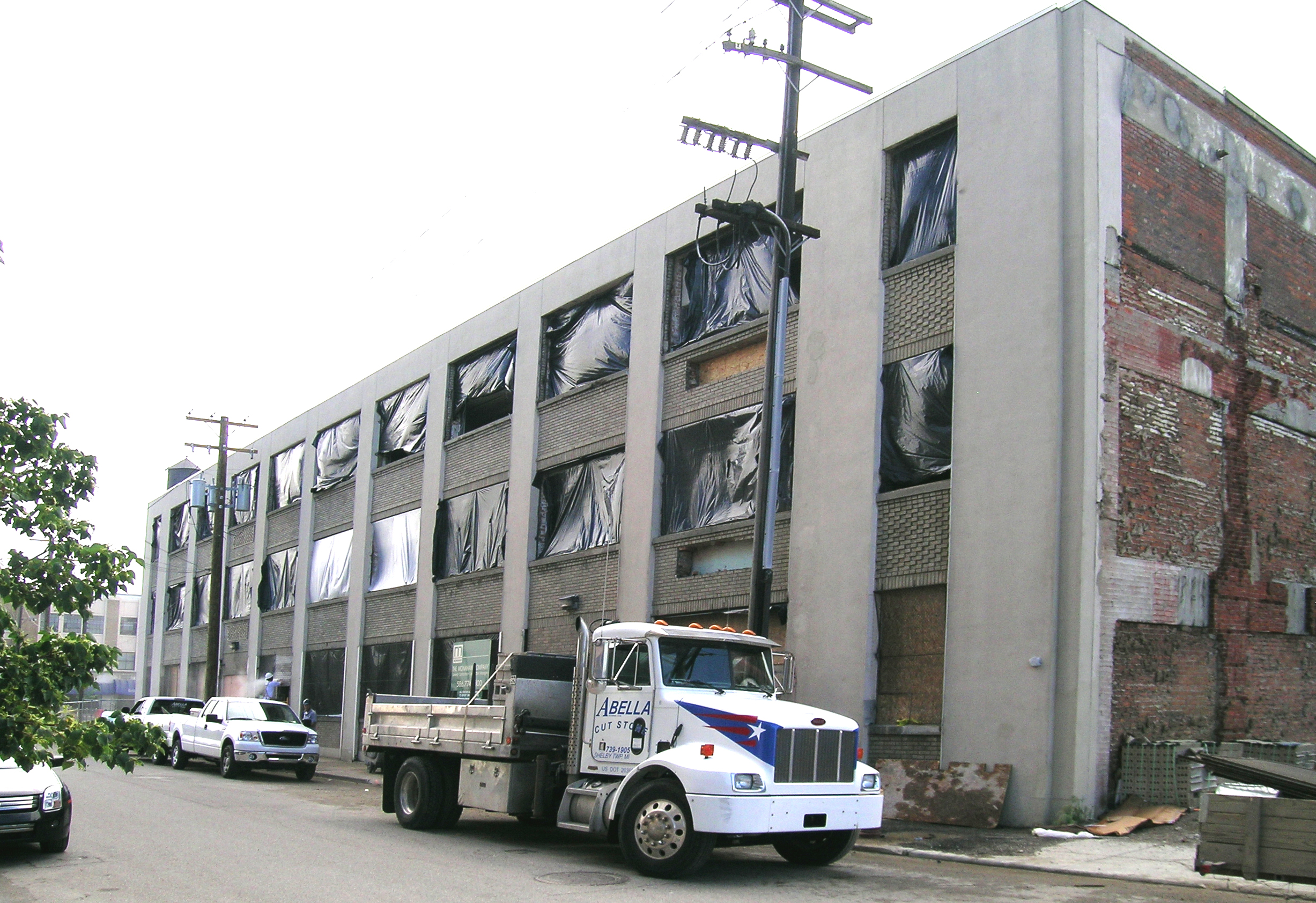
435 Amsterdam under renovation.

This building was incorporated into the University Prep School's Mark Murray Campus.

=== Cadillac Assembly Plant (450 Amsterdam Street) ===
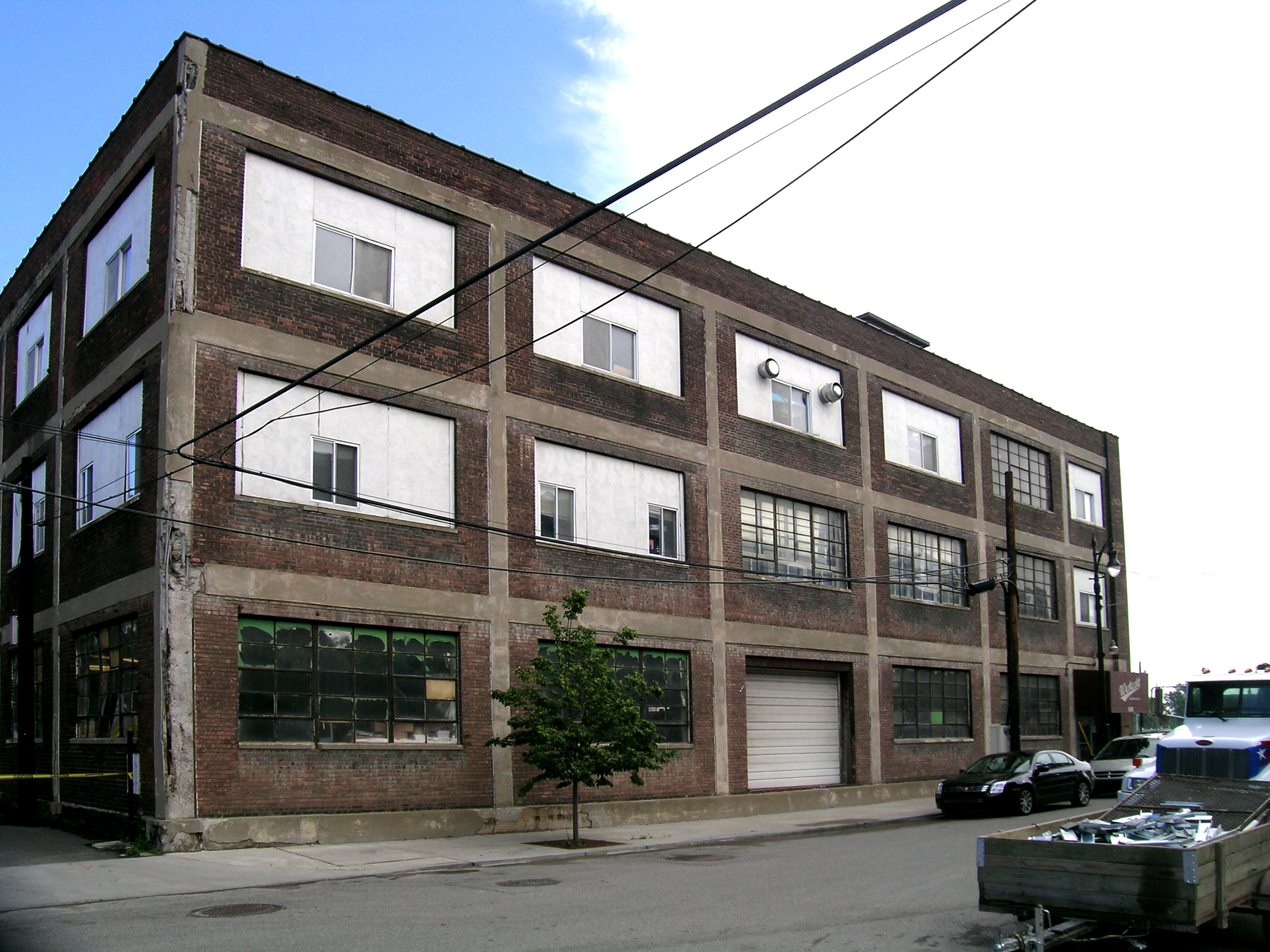
Cadillac Plant, now home to Wescott Paper.

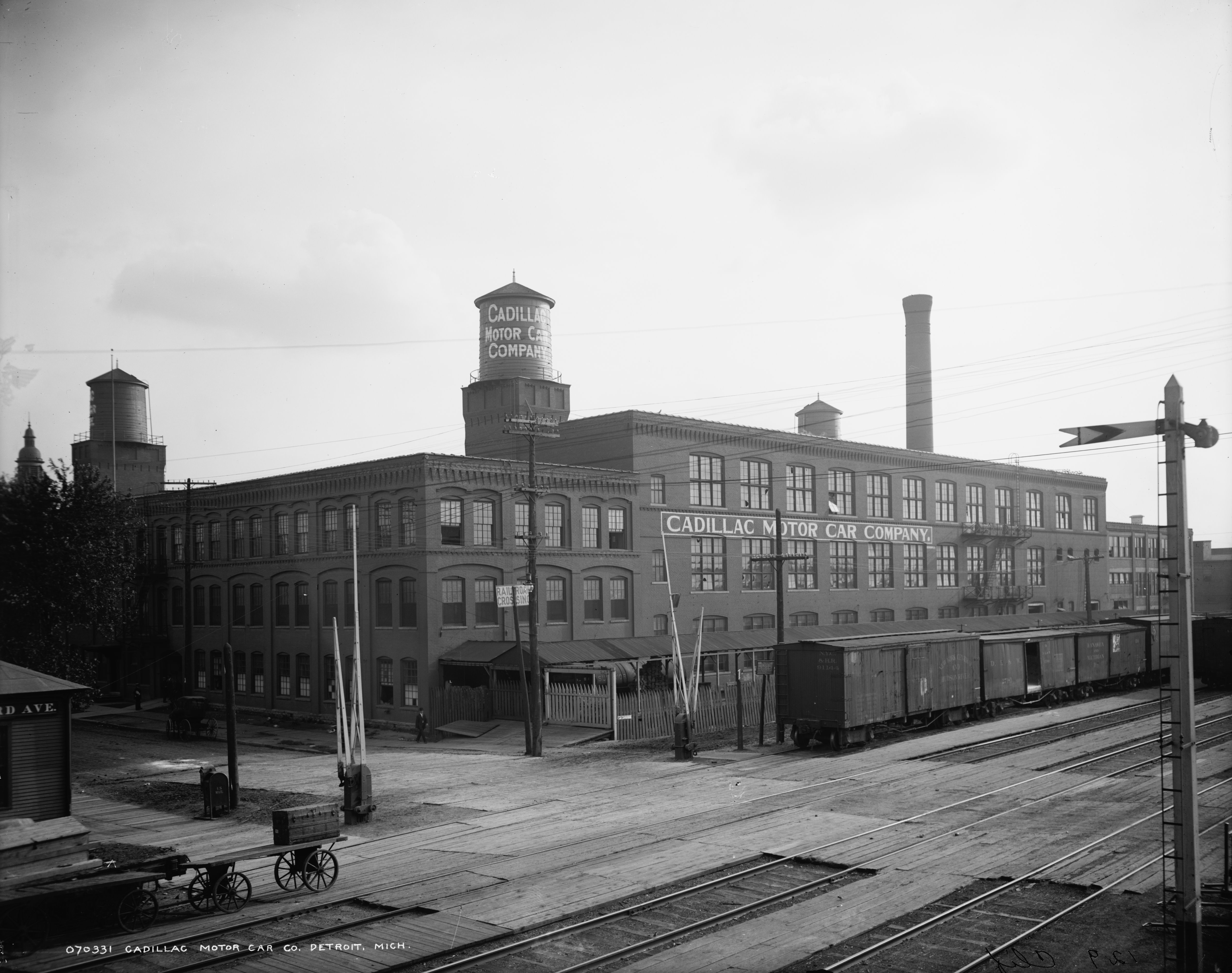
Cadillac Plant, c. 1910

The Cadillac Assembly Plant was designed by George D. Mason in 1905 for the Cadillac Motor Car Company. The plant was constructed in only 67 days after a fire damaged the original buildings on the site.

Cadillac moved their production to the Clark Street plant in Southwest Detroit in 1920, after which Wescott Paper and other tenants leased the building.

Like theAlbert-Kahn-designed Packard Motor Company Building #10, the use of reinforced concrete in this building is considered to be a pioneer application in industrial buildings.

=== Graphic Arts Building (41-47 Burroughs Street) ===
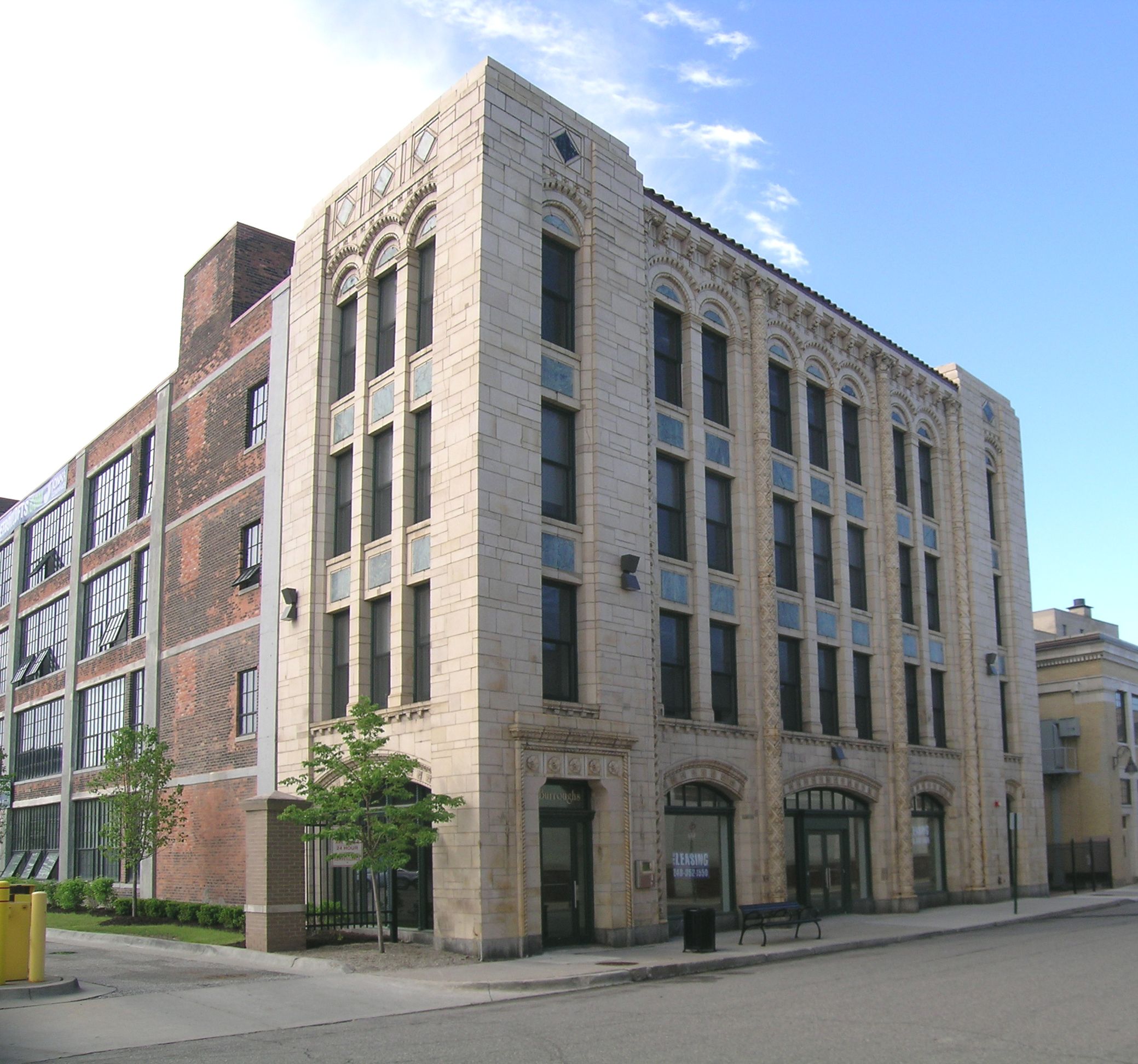
Graphic Arts Building.

The Graphic Arts Building was designed and built in 1926 by Murphy and Burns. It features a striking terra cotta exterior. The original tenants were graphic art professionals, including a commercial engraver, a photographer, and art studios.

Jonna Construction has purchased this property and has redeveloped the building into lofts. The redevelopment, known as the "Lofts at New Amsterdam Phase I," consists of 39 units; as of 2007, the building was 48% occupied. The second phase of the development is in the Caille Brothers building at 6200 Second.

=== G. A. Richards Oakland Company Service Department for Oaklands and Pontiacs (440 Burroughs Street) ===
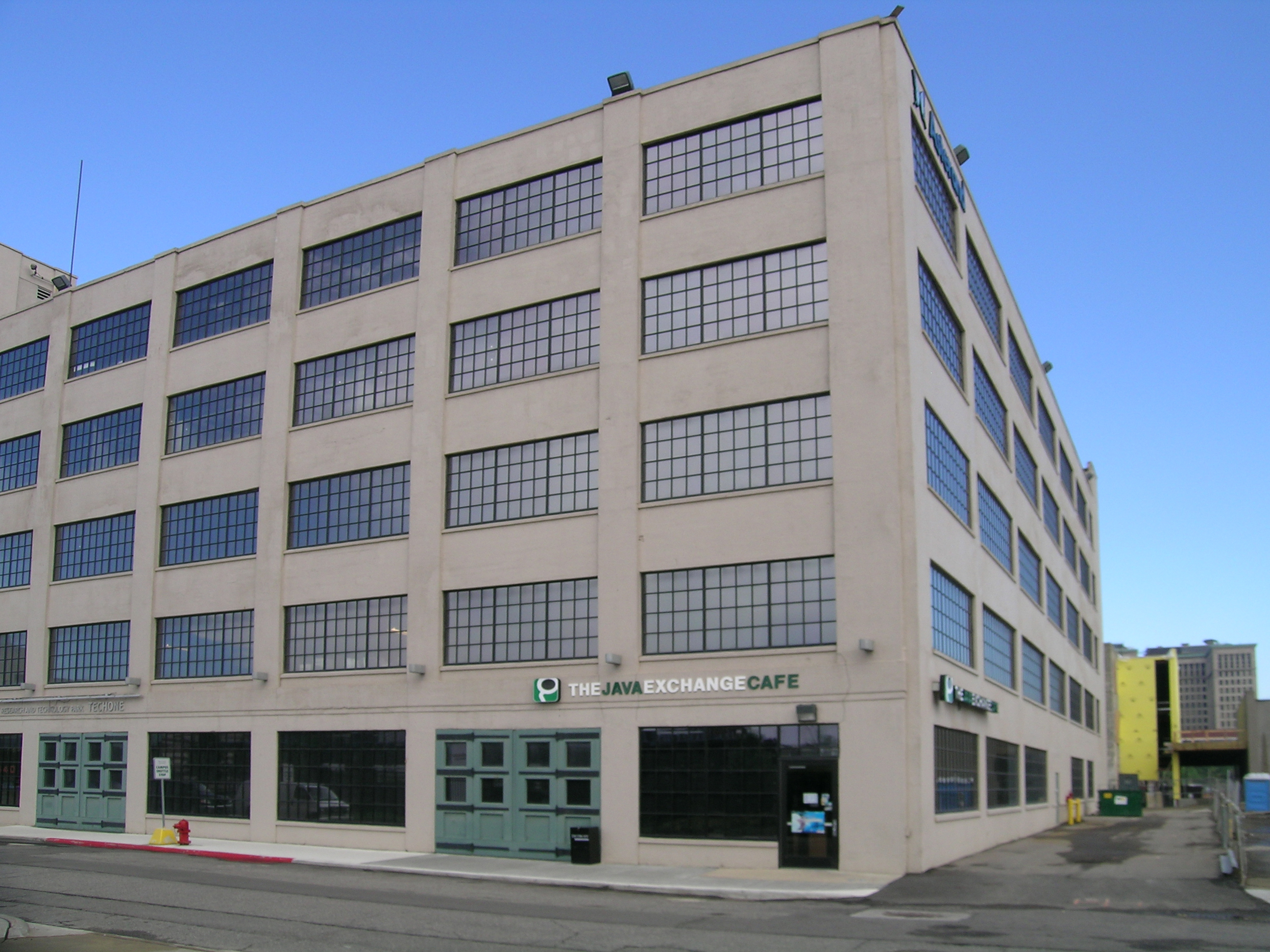
G. A. Richards Oakland Company Service Department, now TechTown, TechOne.

This Pontiac service dealership was designed in 1927 by Albert Kahn. The owner, George A. Richards, also owned WJR and the Detroit Lions.

Beginning in the late 1920s, the Jerry McCarthy Chevrolet Company operated a dealership and service center out of this building. Concurrently, the Chevrolet Chart and Display Department (which would later become Chevrolet Creative Services and occupy the entire building until 1996) ran its operation out of a small corner of the structure at 440 Burroughs Street.

The building is currently TechOne, the first phase of the Techtown research incubator. As of late 2007, the building had 34 tenants.

=== Carney-Labadie Building (5911-5919 Cass Avenue) ===
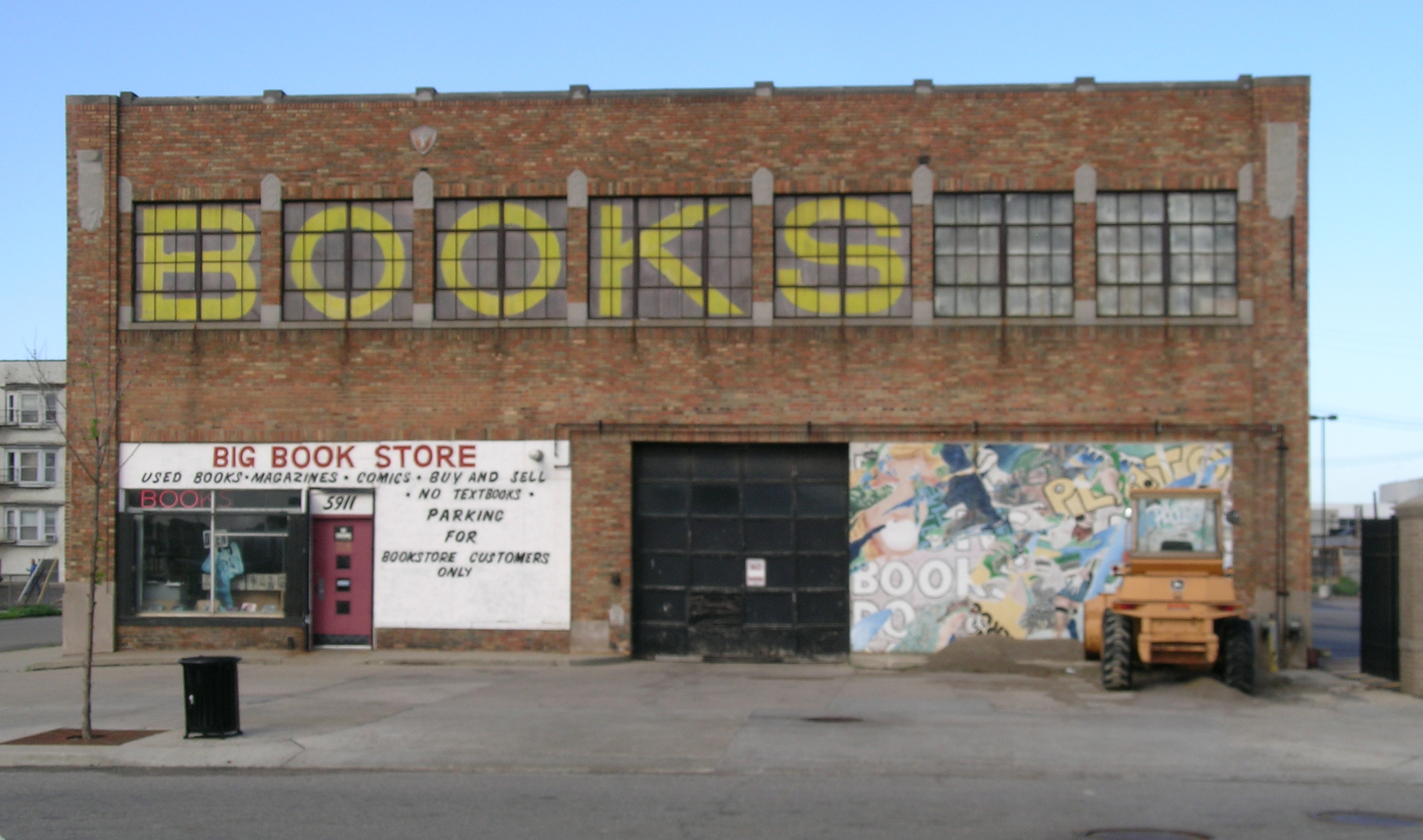
Carney-Labadie Building, now John King Big Bookstore

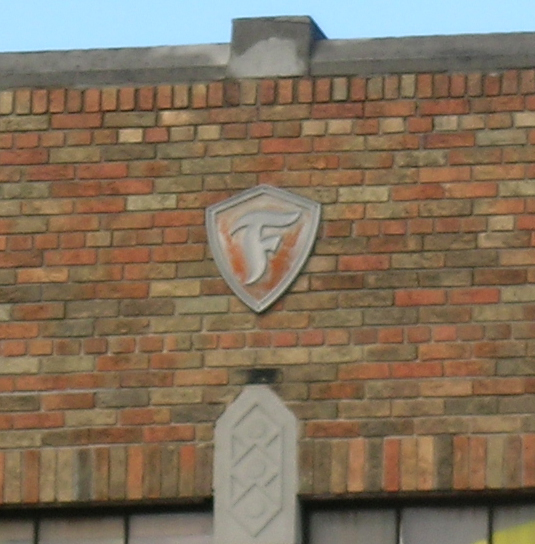
Firestone badge atop John King (Carney-Labadie Building)

C. F. Carney and Joseph Labadie formed the Carney-Labadie Company in 1910 to distribute Exide batteries and Firestone tires. The company purchased the McGraw estate on Cass in 1922 to build a headquarters.

The building is now the John King Big Bookstore, though it has closed as of 2017.

=== Cadillac Sales & Service (6001 Cass) ===
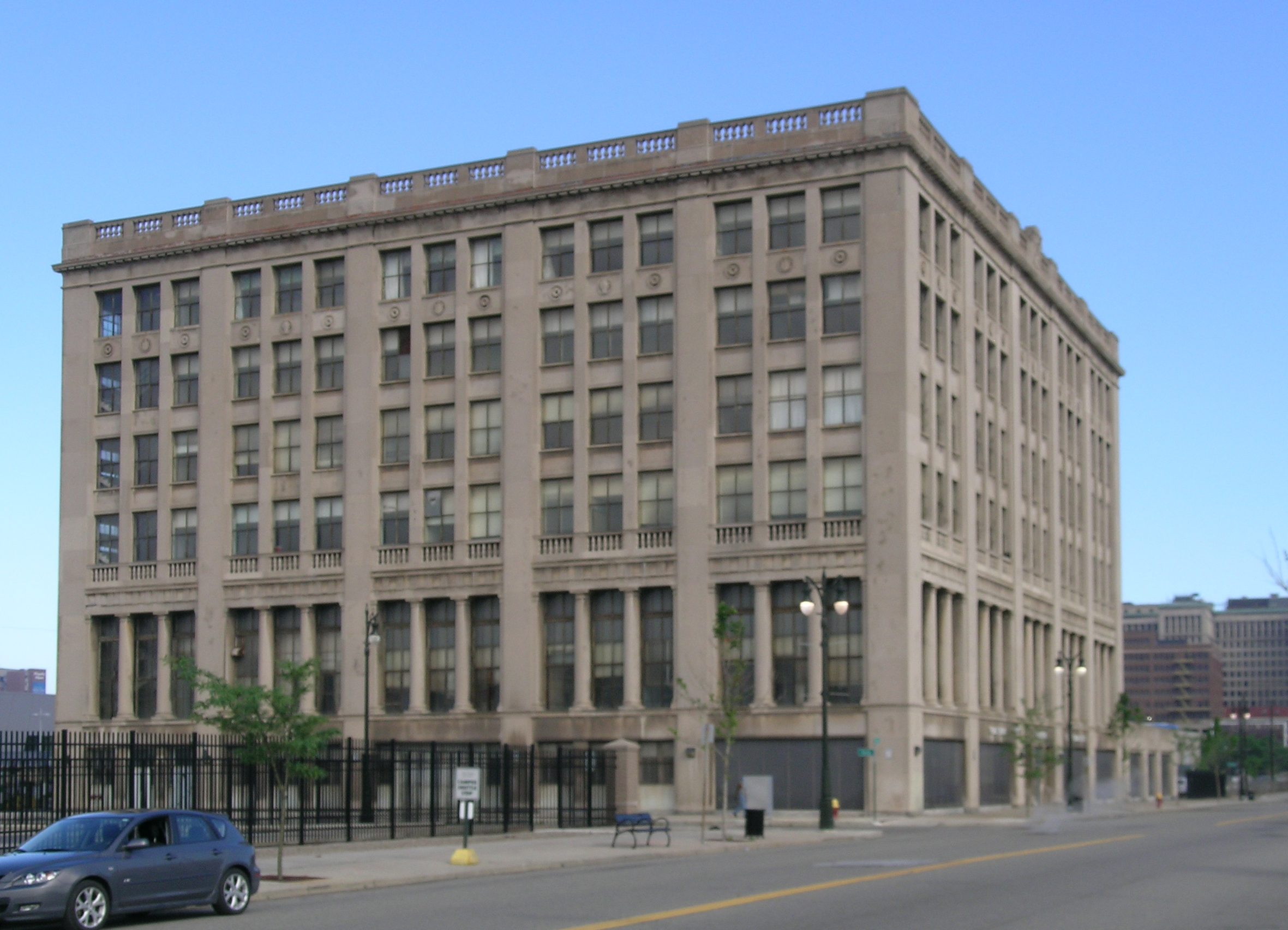
Historic 6001 Cass Avenue

The six-story Cadillac Sales and Service Building was designed by Albert Kahn and built in 1927; it originally contained offices and a showroom. In the 1970s, it was converted into classrooms for Wayne State University's Criminal Justice program. The building has now been restored and converted into a WeWork, which offers beautiful spaces for collaboration, community, and events, .

=== Stewart-Warner Speedometer Corporation Building (6050 Cass Avenue) ===
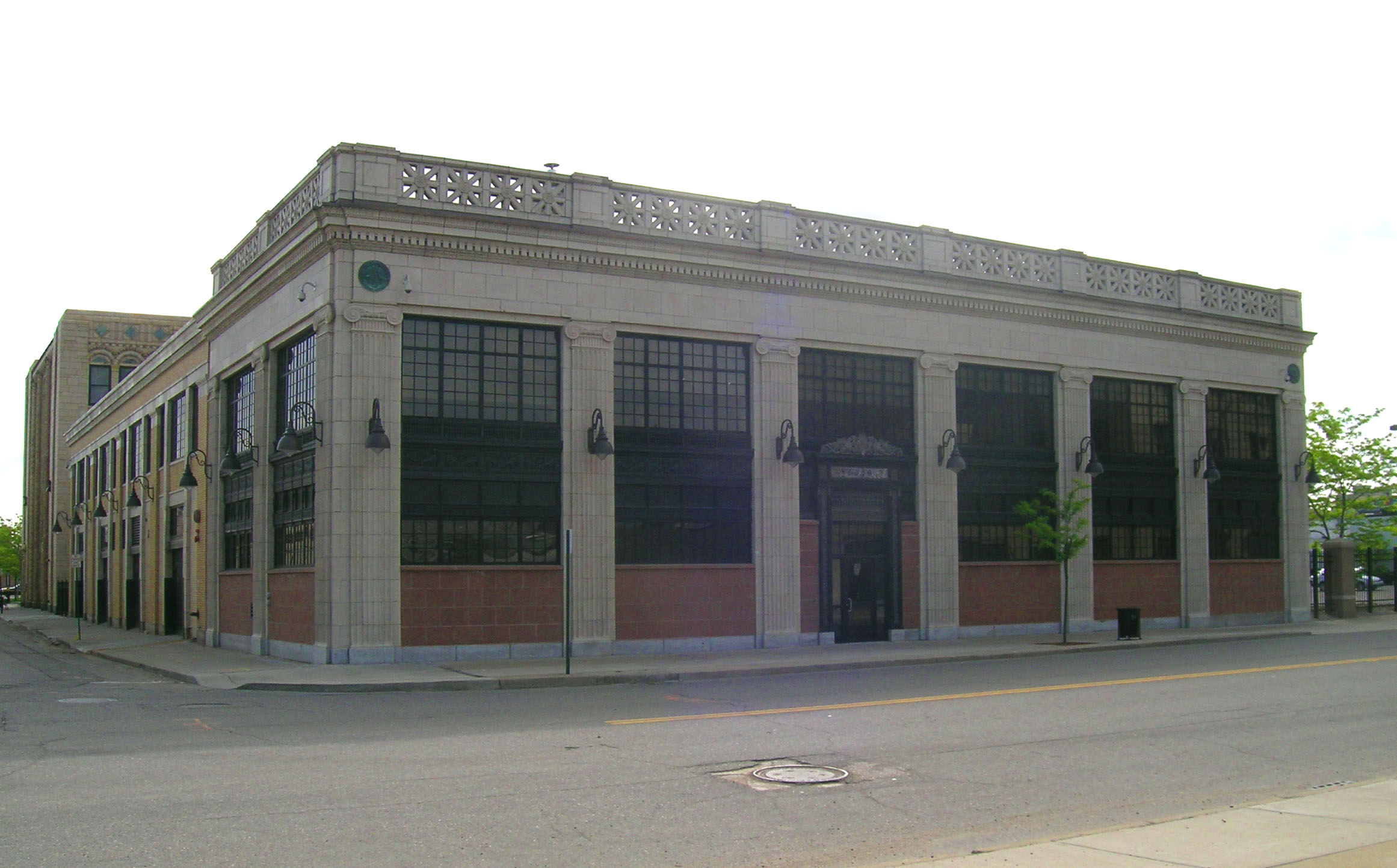
The Stewart-Warner Speedometer Corporation Building, now Wayne State University PD

The Stewart- Warner Speedometer Corporation Building was built in 1925 as the Detroit home of the Stewart-Warner Speedometer Corporation. It was later used as a wheel and brake service center, and the Burroughs Corporation credit union. Wayne State University has used this building to house their parking and mail departments.

In 2008, Wayne State began refurbishing the building for use by the Department of Public Safety. The building opened in June 2008.

=== American Beauty Irons (American Electrical Heater Building) (6110 Cass) ===
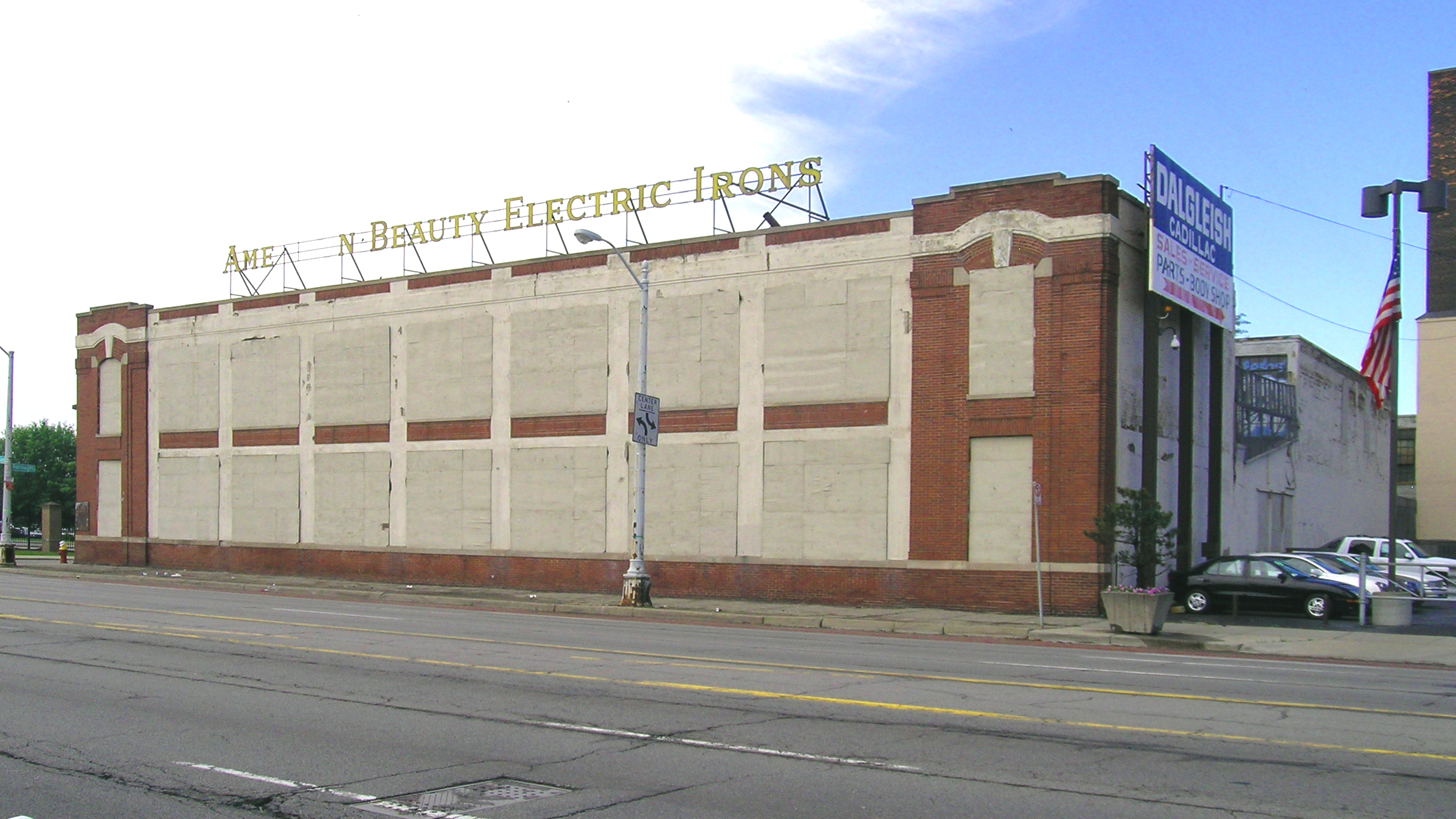
Woodward facade of the American Beauty Iron Co.

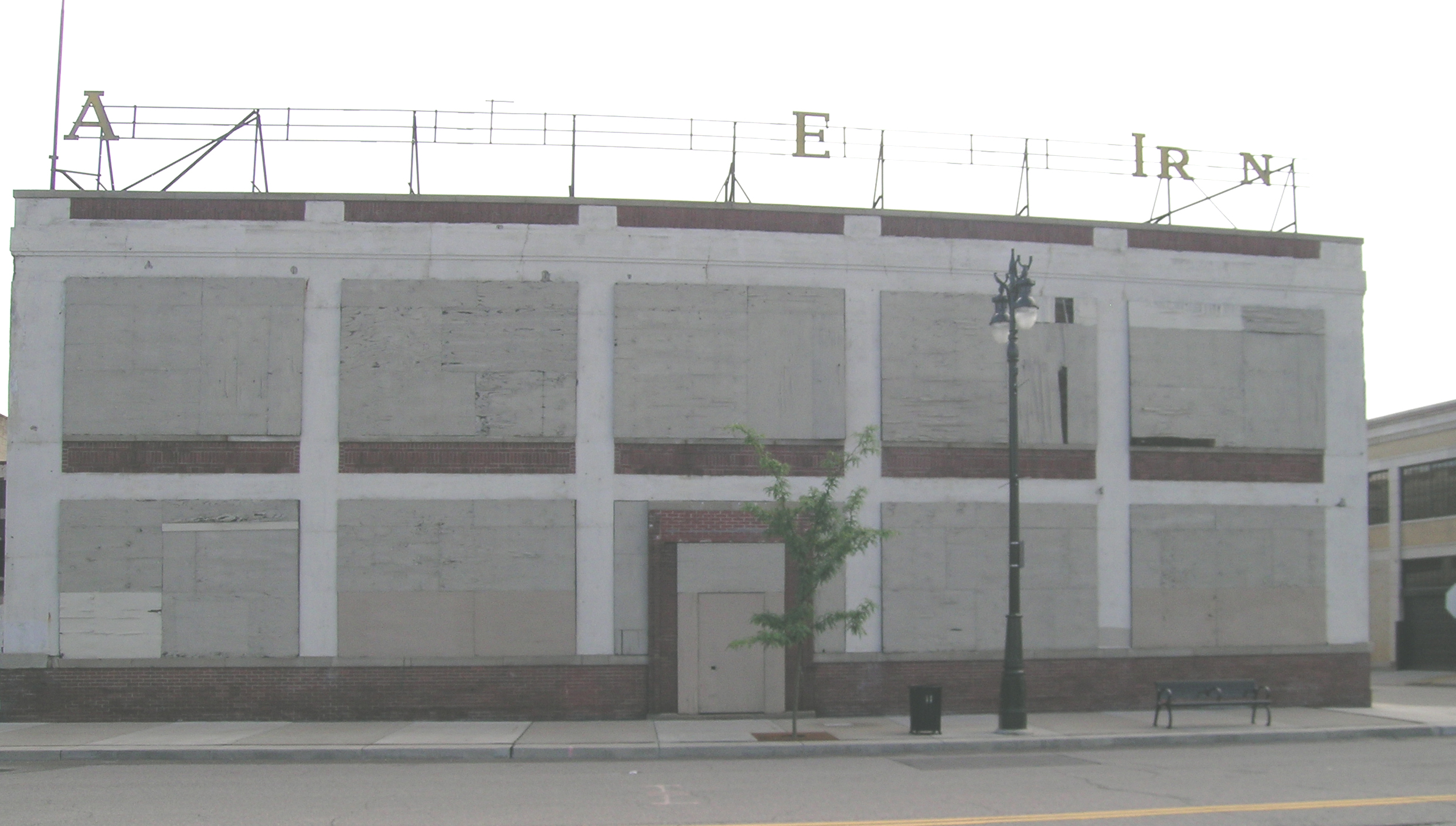
Cassfacade of the American Beauty Iron Co.

The American Beauty Iron Building was designed by Albert Kahn. It was built in 1908 for the American Electrical Heater Company, a maker of electric irons and toasters. A portion of the building was demolished in 1932 when Woodward was widened, and an addition was constructed in 1934.

The building was demolished in August 2012 in order to construct the third phase of TechTown, a nearby biomedical research center.

=== Walter J. Bemb Buick-Pontiac Dealership (6160 Cass Avenue) ===
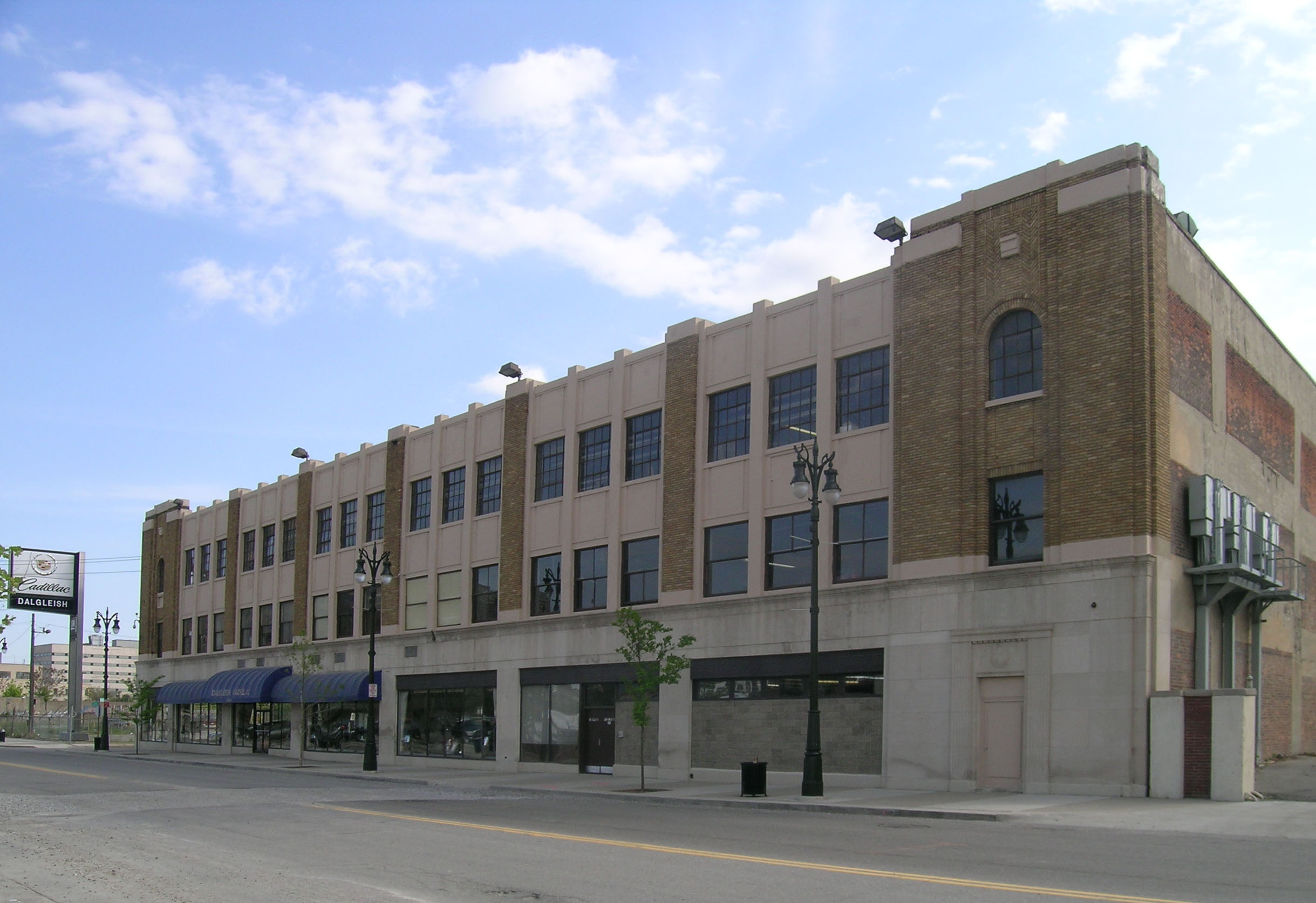
Walter J. Bemb dealership, now Dalgleish Cadillac

The Walter J. Bemb Buick-Pontiac Dealership was designed in 1927 by Albert Kahn. Walter J. Bemb was a Detroit automotive pioneer who began his career in Detroit's first automobile dealership working for William E. Metzger. He worked for both Ford Motor Company and Hudson Motor Company until striking out on his own in 1912 with the Bemb-Robinson Company, selling Hudson and later Essex automobiles. He later became associated with General Motors.

In 1972, Dalgleish Cadillac, a dealership which has been in business since 1922, purchased the building. The dealership, the last Cadillac dealership in Detroit, closed in 2009. The building is part of a $93-million rehabilitation project planned by nearby Wayne State University; it will be converted into a biomedical research center.

=== Engine Co. 17/Ladder Co. 7 (6100 Second Avenue) ===
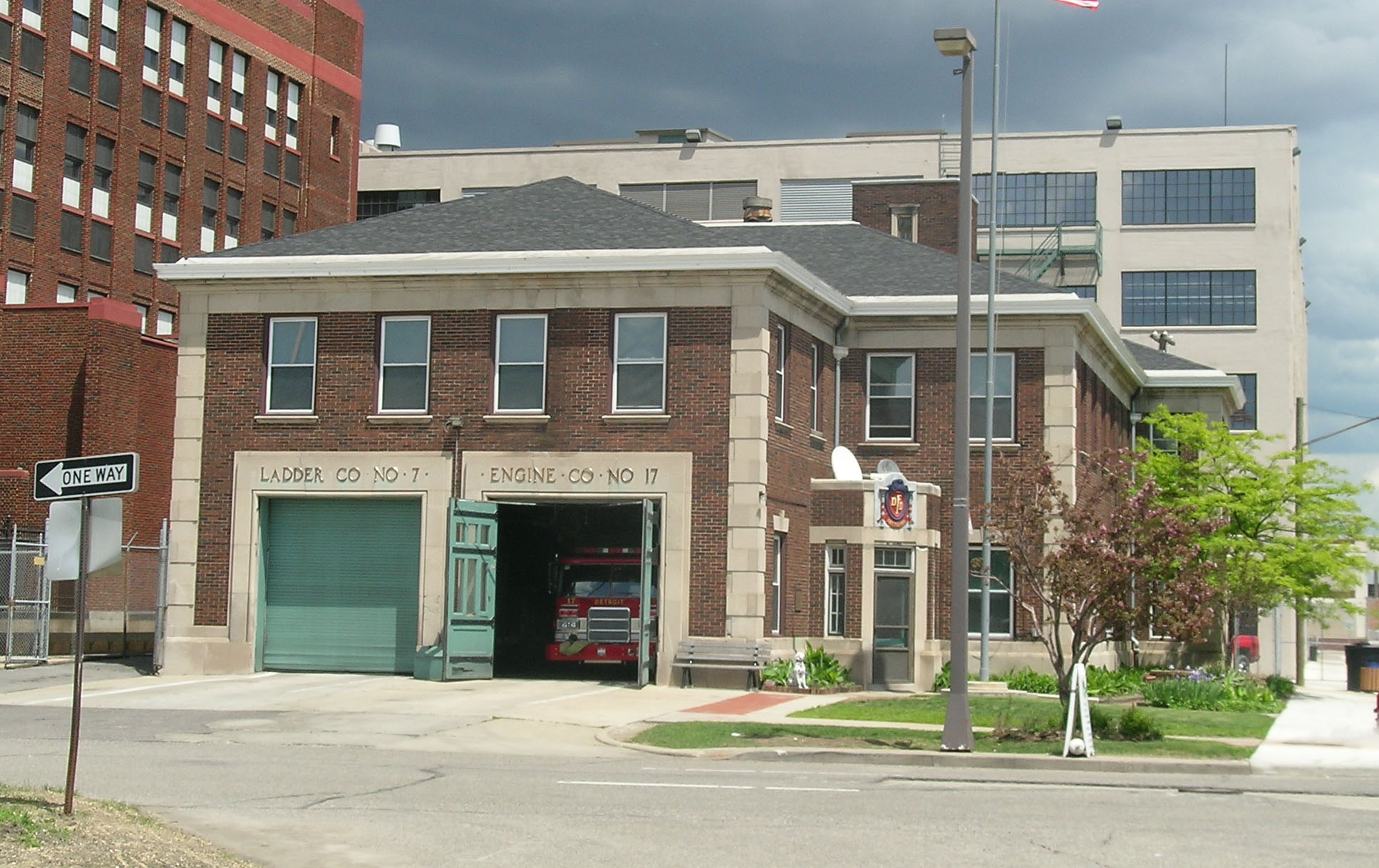
Engine Co. 17/Ladder Co. 7

The Engine 17 and Ladder 7 companies were originally organized on June 17, 1893, at the corner of Cass and Amsterdam. In 1921, the original firehouse was sold, and in late 1922 the companies moved into a new firehouse at the corner of Second and Burroughs. The fire station has been in continuous service since.

=== Detroit Edison Amsterdam Substation (6126 Second Avenue) ===
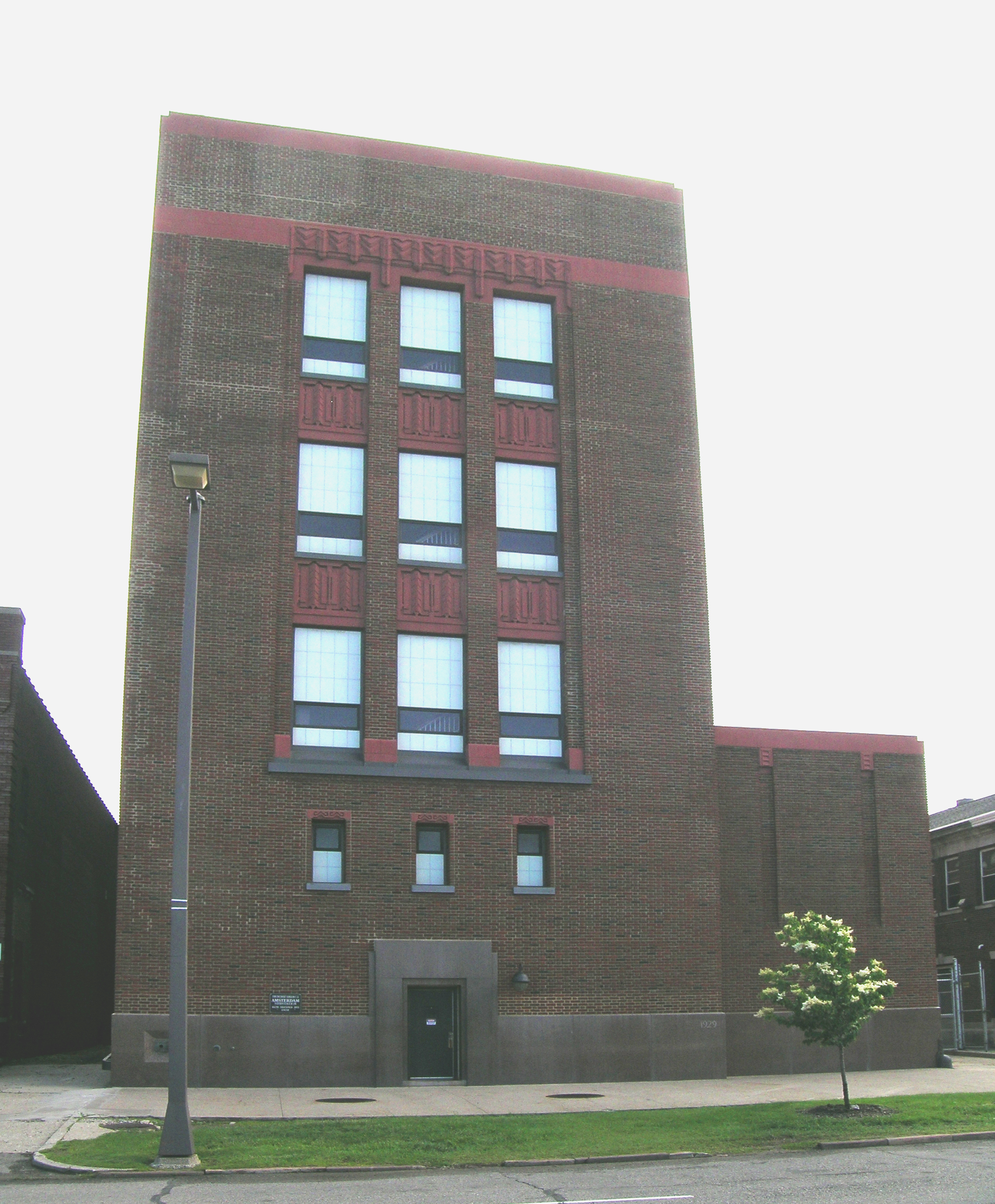
Amsterdam Substation on Second

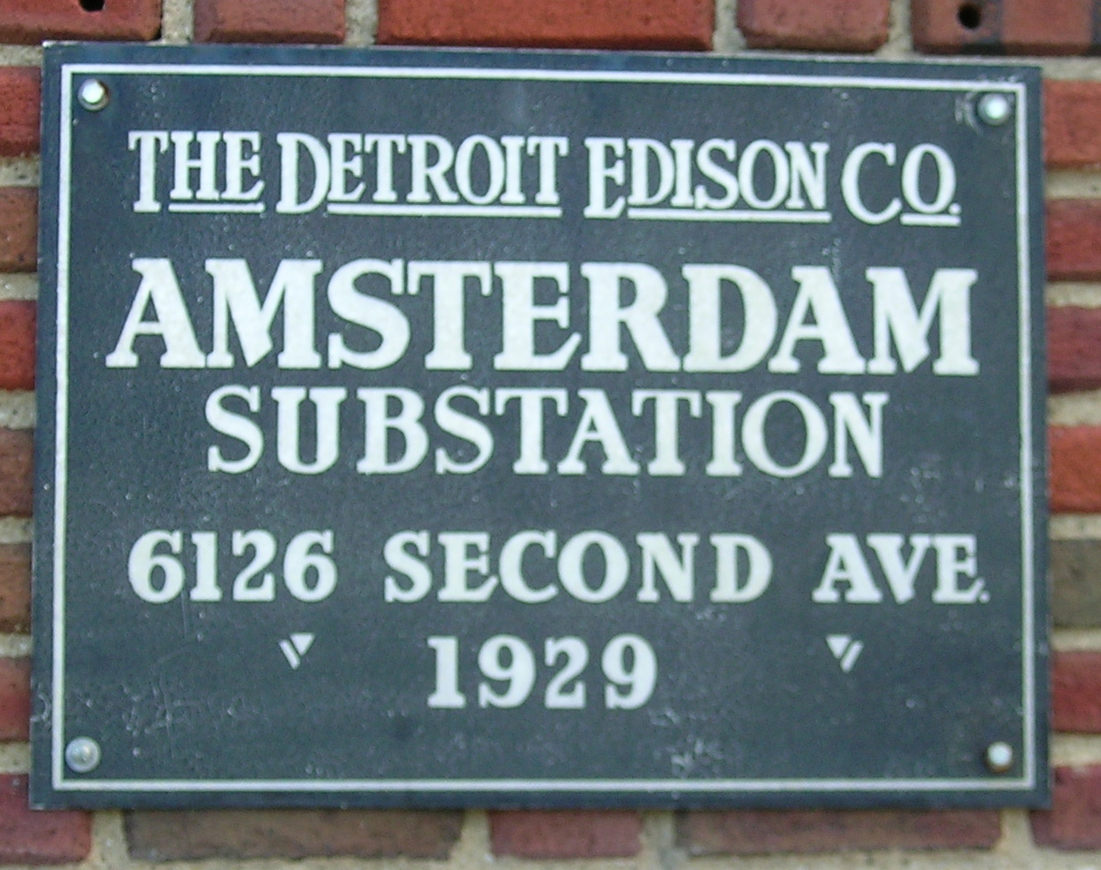
Plaque on the facade of the Amsterdam Substation

The Amsterdam Substation was built in 1929 for Detroit Edison, and is still in use today.

=== Detroit Edison Substation (6134 Second Avenue) ===
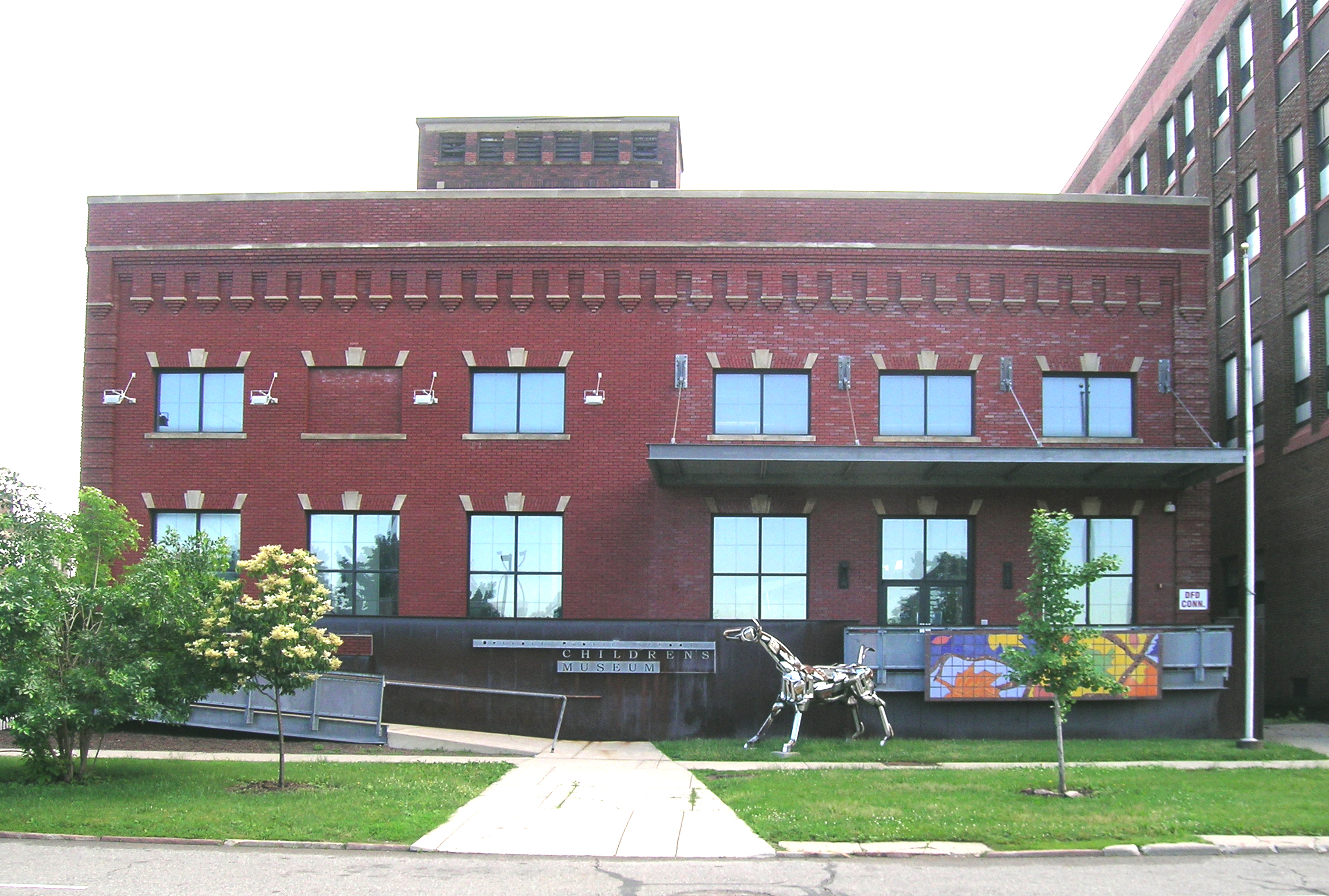
Detroit Edison Substation, now Detroit Children's Museum

The Detroit Edison Substation at 6134 Second Avenue was built c. 1910 by the Detroit Edison Company. The building eventually fell into disuse, and in 2001, the Detroit Public Schools bought the building and paid three million dollars to renovate it. After renovation, the schools moved the Detroit Children's Museum from its Midtown location to the site.

=== Caille Brothers Building (6200 Second Avenue) ===
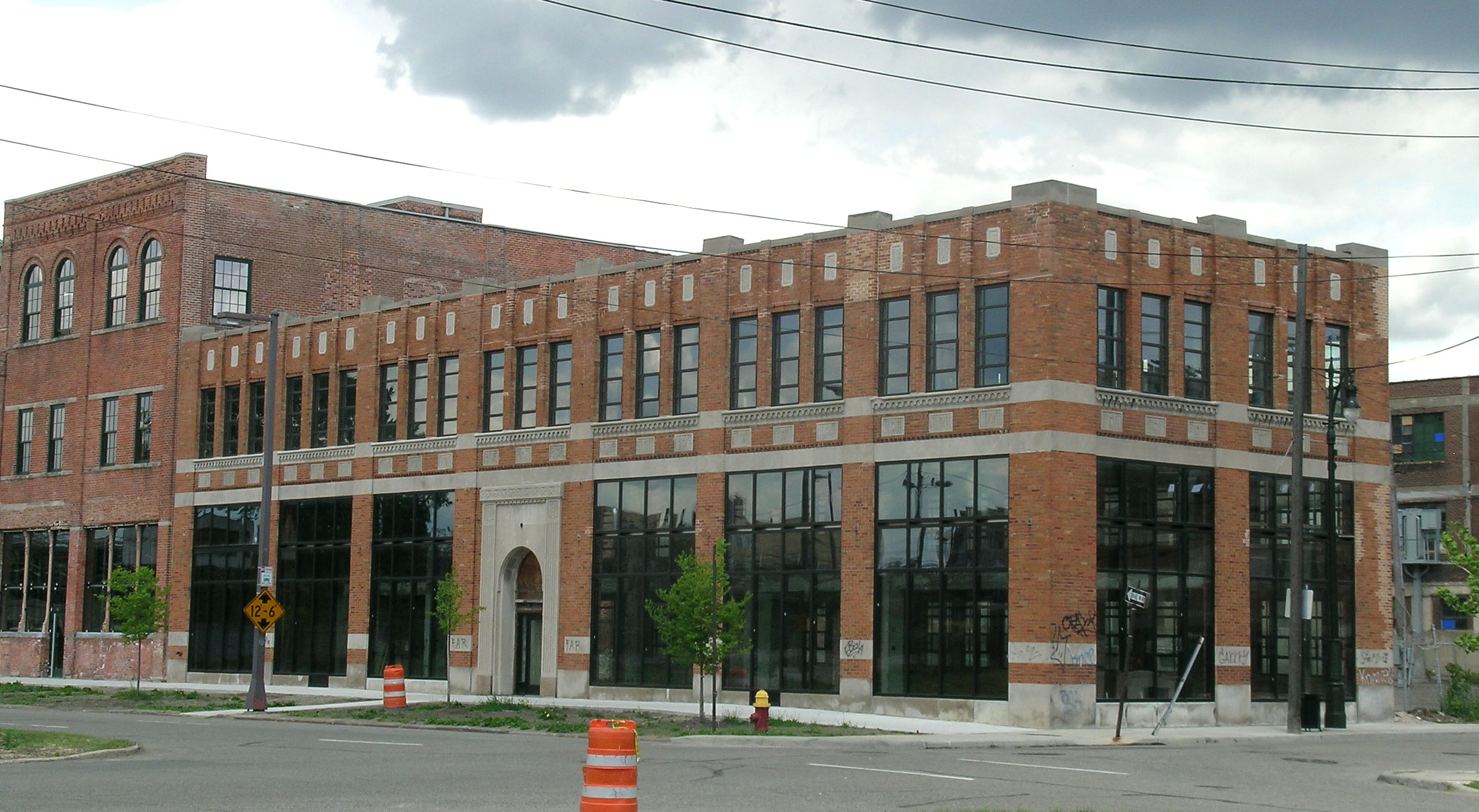
Caille Brothers Building (2008)

The Caille Brothers Building was built in several stages between 1900 and 1930.

The Caille Brothers Company began manufacturing in Detroit in 1895, when A. Arthur Caille, inventor of the penny slot machine, moved his business to Detroit from Saginaw. Caille ran the company along with his brother Adolf. The brothers built the company to become one of the largest penny slot makers in the world, employing over 400 people in 1912. Later they expanded their product line to include other items such as marine motors, scales, and the conveyor belts used in grocery stores.

The building was later known as the Century Floral Building

Jonna Construction purchased this property and redeveloped the building into lofts. Phase I of the development, now completed, was in the Graphic Arts Building at 41-47 Burroughs. The property plan, known as the Lofts at New Amsterdam, Phase II, called for 62 loft units in the building, and was completed in 2010, and is located across the street from the new Pistons Performance Center, in New Center.

=== 425 York Street ===
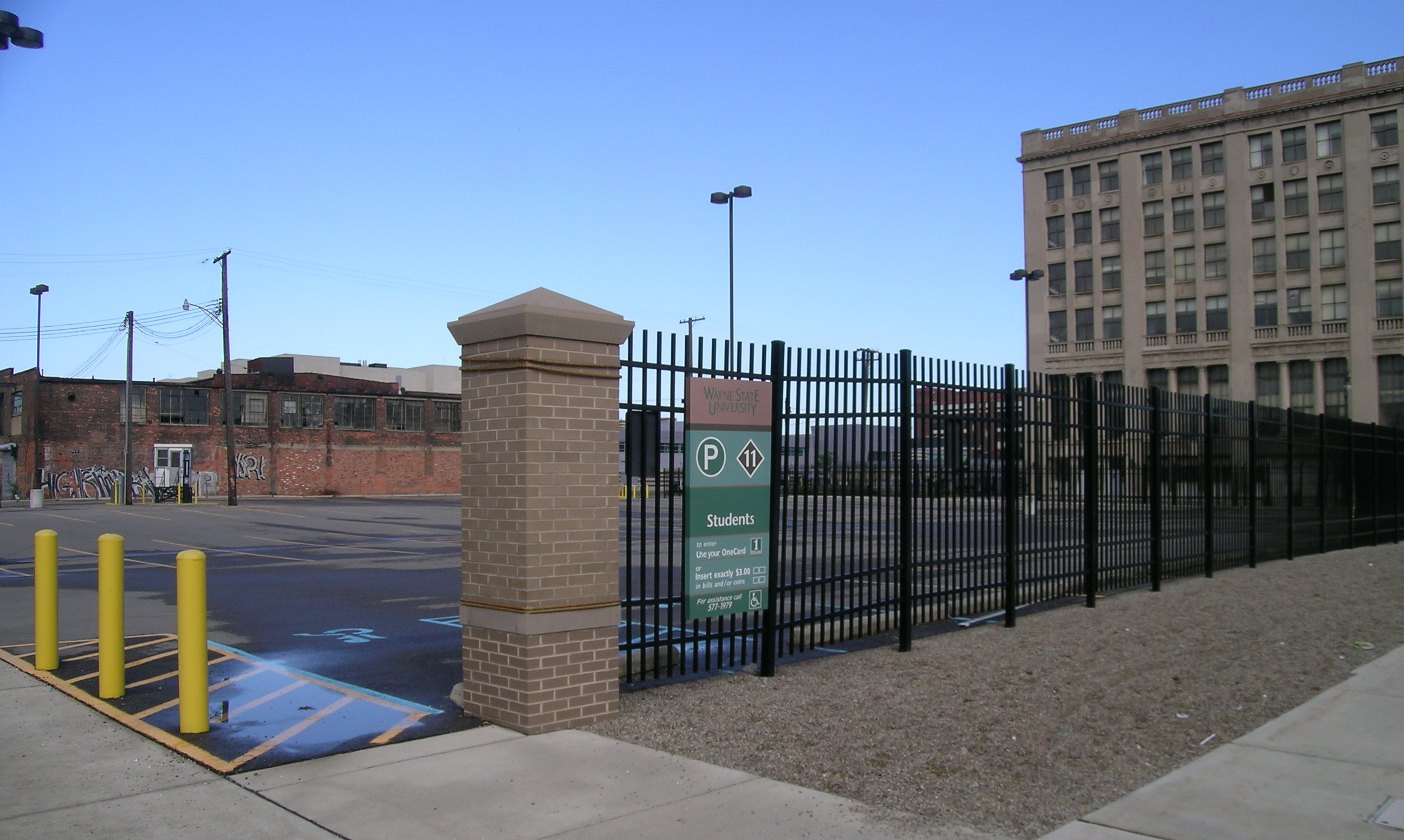
Parking lot where 425 York once stood

This building on the corner of Cass Avenue and York Street has been demolished by Wayne State University. A surface parking lot has replaced it.

== Education ==
New Center is within the Detroit Public Schools district.

Thirkell Elementary School, Golightly K-8 and Hutchins Middle School, and Northwestern High School serve New Amsterdam.
