= Shore Line Subdivision =

Railroad line in Michigan and Ohio

The Shore Line Subdivision is a railroad line owned and operated by Grand Trunk Western Railroad (GTW), a subsidiary of Canadian National (CN), which connects the cities of Detroit, Michigan and Toledo, Ohio, paralleling the shore of Lake Erie.

== Description ==
The Shore Line Sub is single track with the parallel Tunnel Industrial track beginning at Milwaukee Junction at MP 54.8 south to Vinewood Interlocking at MP 51.2 where the Tunnel Industrial ends. The line continues past West Detroit junction at MP 50.1 on trackage rights over a Norfolk Southern (NS) railway (originally the Wabash Railroad mainline) to Delray Interlocking at MP 47.8. The line continues along the NS railway until it crosses the River Rouge picking back up on its own trackage. From the Conrail River Rouge Yard begins the short double track portion of the line until returning to a single track at MP 43.2 just south of the Ecorse River. It continues as a single track (with various sidings) all the way to Toledo. The line parallels the Norfolk Southern Detroit Line directly to its east for the vast majority of its length, namely the northbound track #2.

== History ==
The line was originally built as the Detroit and Toledo Shore Line Railroad (D&TSL). It served as a bridge line for joint owners NKP and GTW until N&W sold its half to GTW in 1981. From that time forward the Shore Line Sub has been lengthened to include territory that was once part of the Wabash Rwy from Rouge Bridge to West Detroit, as well as territory that was part of the GTW Mount Clemens Subdivision.

== See also ==
- Detroit Line
- Michigan Line
