= Detroit, Monroe and Toledo Railroad =

- System map

Overview
- Headquarters: Detroit, Michigan, U.S.
- Dates of operation: April 26, 1855–January 1, 1915
- Successor: New York Central Railroad

Technical
- Track gauge: 4 ft 8 1/2 in (1,435 mm) standard gauge
- Length: 65 miles (105 km)

The Detroit, Monroe and Toledo Railroad (DM&T) was a shortline railroad which operated in the U.S. states of Michigan and Ohio. Opened in 1856, its main line ran from Detroit, Michigan, to Toledo, Ohio. The railroad leased itself to the Michigan Southern and Northern Indiana Railroad (MS&NI) in 1856. A 1914 merger which created the New York Central Railroad led to the DM&T's consolidation into the new road, ending its existence.

== Founding and charter ==
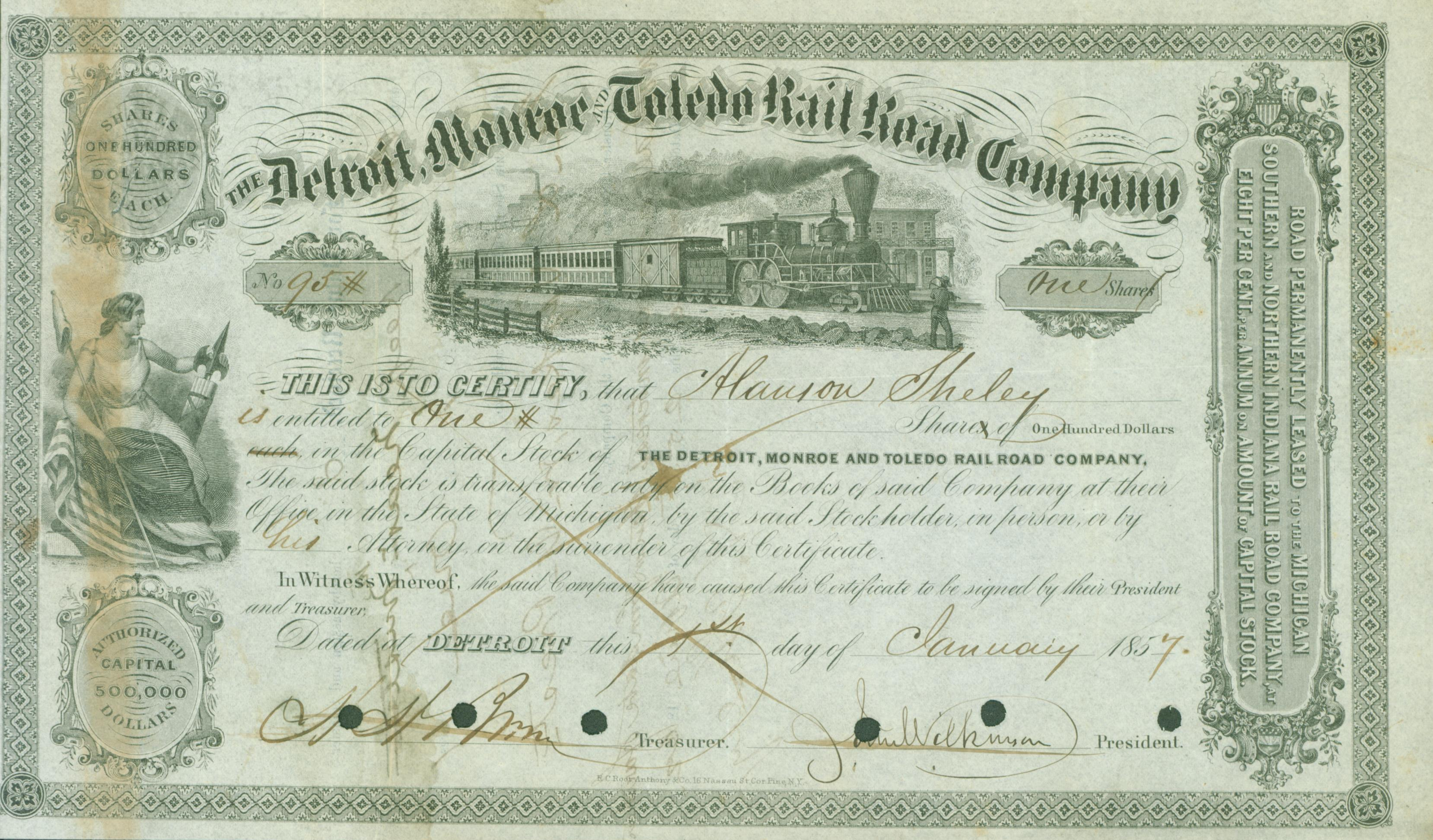
Share of the Detroit, Monroe and Toledo Rail Road Company, issued 1 January 1857

On March 3, 1851, the state of Ohio granted a charter to the Michigan Southern and Northern Indiana Railroad (MS&NI), allowing it to build a rail line, in part, from Toledo, Ohio, to the Ohio-Michigan border.

The Detroit, Monroe and Toledo Railroad was incorporated in the state of Michigan on April 26, 1855, with headquarters in Detroit. The charter allowed for a line originating in Detroit, Michigan, passing roughly along the shoreline of Lake Erie to the small town of Monroe on the Ohio-Michigan border. The DM&T obtained from the MS&NI the right to continue the line from the Michigan border to Toledo.

By the end of June 1856, the DM&T had constructed 54 miles (87 km) of track from Detroit south to the Michigan state line. On July 1, 1856, the DM&T leased itself in perpetuity to the MS&NI. The terms of the lease required the MS&NI to finish the line from the Michigan border into Toledo, and to assume payment on all outstanding bonds and other debt of the DM&T. Over the next five months, the MS&NI completed the final 11 miles (18 km) of track, with the last rail laid on December 25, 1856. The first train ran over the line the same day. The road was standard gauge for its entire length.

On February 11, 1869, the MS&NI and the Lake Shore Railway merged to form the Lake Shore and Michigan Southern Railway (LS&MS).

The New York Central and Hudson River Railroad acquired a controlling majority of the LS&MS in 1877. On April 29, 1914, the asset restructuring and refinancing of the New York Central led to the abolishment of all subsidiary corporations and their consolidation into the new New York Central Railroad. The DM&T merged into the New York Central effective January 1, 1915.

== Current tracks ==
The DM&T tracks still exist. They constitute the southbound track of the Detroit Line of the Norfolk Southern Railway.

== Bibliography ==
- Flint, Henry M. (1868). The Railroads of the United States: Their History and Statistics Comprising the Progress and Present Condition of the Various Lines With Their Earnings and Expenses. Philadelphia: John E. Potter & Co.
- Johnston's Detroit City Directory and Advertising Gazetteer of Michigan. Detroit: H. Barns, & Co. 1861.
- Leavy, Michael (2006). The New York Central System. Charleston, S.C.: Arcadia Publishing. ISBN 9780738549286.
- Meints, Graydon M. (1992). Michigan Railroads and Railroad Companies. East Lansing, Mich.: Michigan State University Press. ISBN 9780870133183.
- Moody, John (1917). Moody's Analysis of Investments. Part I - Steam Railroads. Eighth Annual Number. New York: Moody's Investors Service.
- Ohio Commissioner of Railroads and Telegraphs (1874). Seventh Annual Report of the Commissioner of Railroads and Telegraphs of Ohio for the Year Ending June 30, 1873. Columbus, Ohio: Nevins and Myers, State Printers.
- Poor's Manual of the Railroads for 1872-73. New York: H.V. and H.W. Poor. 1872.
