= Caille Bros. =

Detroit-based manufacturer of coin-operated machines

The Detroit-based Caille Bros. Manufacturing Company along with Chicago-based Mills Novelty Company, were one of the most successful companies in the United States coin-operated machine industry during the 19th century and early 20th century. They became popular releasing not only slot machines, but grew the company to encompass arcade games, weight scales, strength testers, gum machines and Bagatelle-style games. They also produced a popular line of outboard motors. Once penny arcades began to decline Caille even built coin-operated "moving picture'' machines, sometimes called nickelodeons. Following the death of company President A. Arthur Caille in 1916, the company continued to release mainly trade simulators and gambling machines, but with little variety in their mechanical game output, were overtaken by newer players such as A.B.T, Erie Machine co., Chester Pollard and Exhibit Supply, eventually leading Adolph A. Caille, the surviving brother, to sell the business to Fuller Johnson in 1932.

== History ==
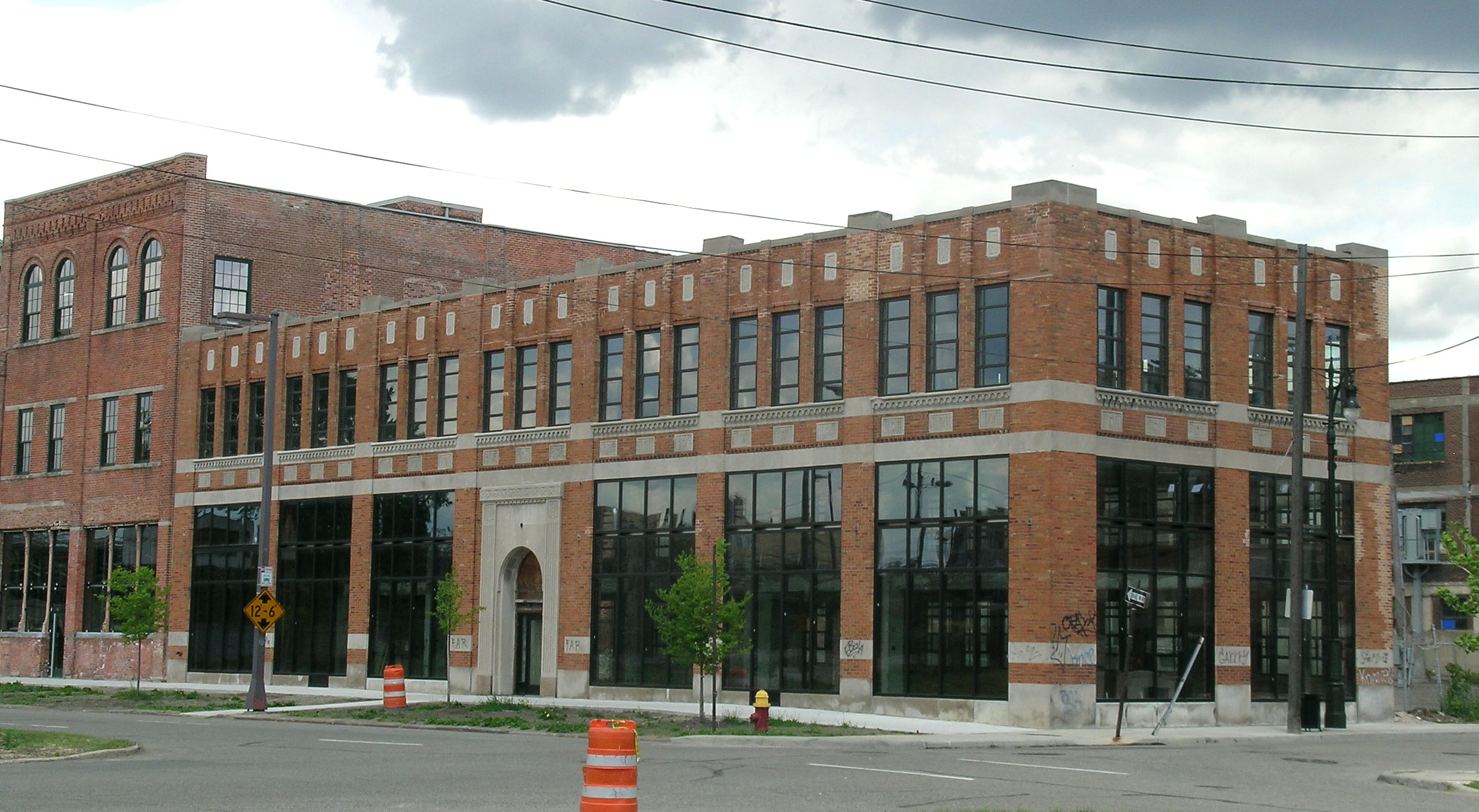
Caille Brothers Building in Detroit

The business had its inception in 1893, when Auguste Arthur Caille, often referred to as A. Arthur, at age 30 founded the Caille Company and began operations in the city of Saginaw, Michigan, where he maintained headquarters until 1896. The Caille Company was incorporated under the laws of the state of Michigan in 1901, when A. Arthur partnered with his older brother, Adolph Arthur Caille, and they relocated to Detroit, Michigan and laid the foundation for the Caille Bros. Manufacturing Company. Their initial operations were based on a capital stock of three hundred thousand dollars, which when adjusting for inflation, is about $8.5 million today. Both brothers were practical mechanics and skilled artisans, as both demonstrated a distinctive ability for the invention of mechanical devices. The original factory in Detroit was a modest one and located at the corner of Woodward and Baltimore Avenues, but later relocated when the Caille brothers took over the former Vanderbilt Match Co. factory on Second Avenue near Amsterdam Street in 1904. Located at 1300-1350 Second Avenue, they established the Caille Brothers Building - the fine, modern plant utilized by the company as their world headquarters until the business was sold in 1932. The Caille Bros. headquarters was constructed of brick and stone, and the main building, one hundred and twenty by three hundred and fifty feet in dimensions, was three stories tall, not including the basement. The factory proper, a single story, sat at the rear of the main building. By 1904, they had become the largest employer in Detroit, Michigan. The automobile industry, which started growing a few years later acquired a lot of employees from the Caille Bros. It was their coin-slot devices that ultimately led to the establishment of penny arcades, places where various coin operated machines could be played. The enormous sales volume of the coin slot machines produced by the Caille Bros. Manufacturing Company testify to their distinctive merit of having produced slot machines of the highest quality and design in their day, earning the Caille Bros. a reputation as the "Rolls-Royce" of floor machines. They would eventually expand their product line to include other items such as marine motors, scales, and the conveyor belts used in grocery stores. The Caille Bros. Manufacturing Company maintained branch offices in New York, Chicago and Paris. The stock of the company was virtually controlled by the Caille brothers, of whom A. Arthur Caille served as president and General Manager, and Adolph A., vice-president and Secretary. The former had the general supervision of the finance and sales departments of the business, and the latter had charge of the manufacturing and the directing of the general accounting and office affairs.

== Patents ==
- Caille, Auguste Arthur. Vending-machine. US 730232, United States Patent and Trademark Office, 9 June 1903.
- Caille, Auguste Arthur. Printing or Embossing Machine. US 783927, United States Patent and Trademark Office, 28 February 1905.
- Caille, Auguste Arthur. Casing for Coin-Actuated Machines. US 262686, United States Patent and Trademark Office, 11 July 1905.
- Caille, Auguste Arthur. Foldable Rudder. US 1107408, United States Patent and Trademark Office, 18 August 1914.

== Notable games ==
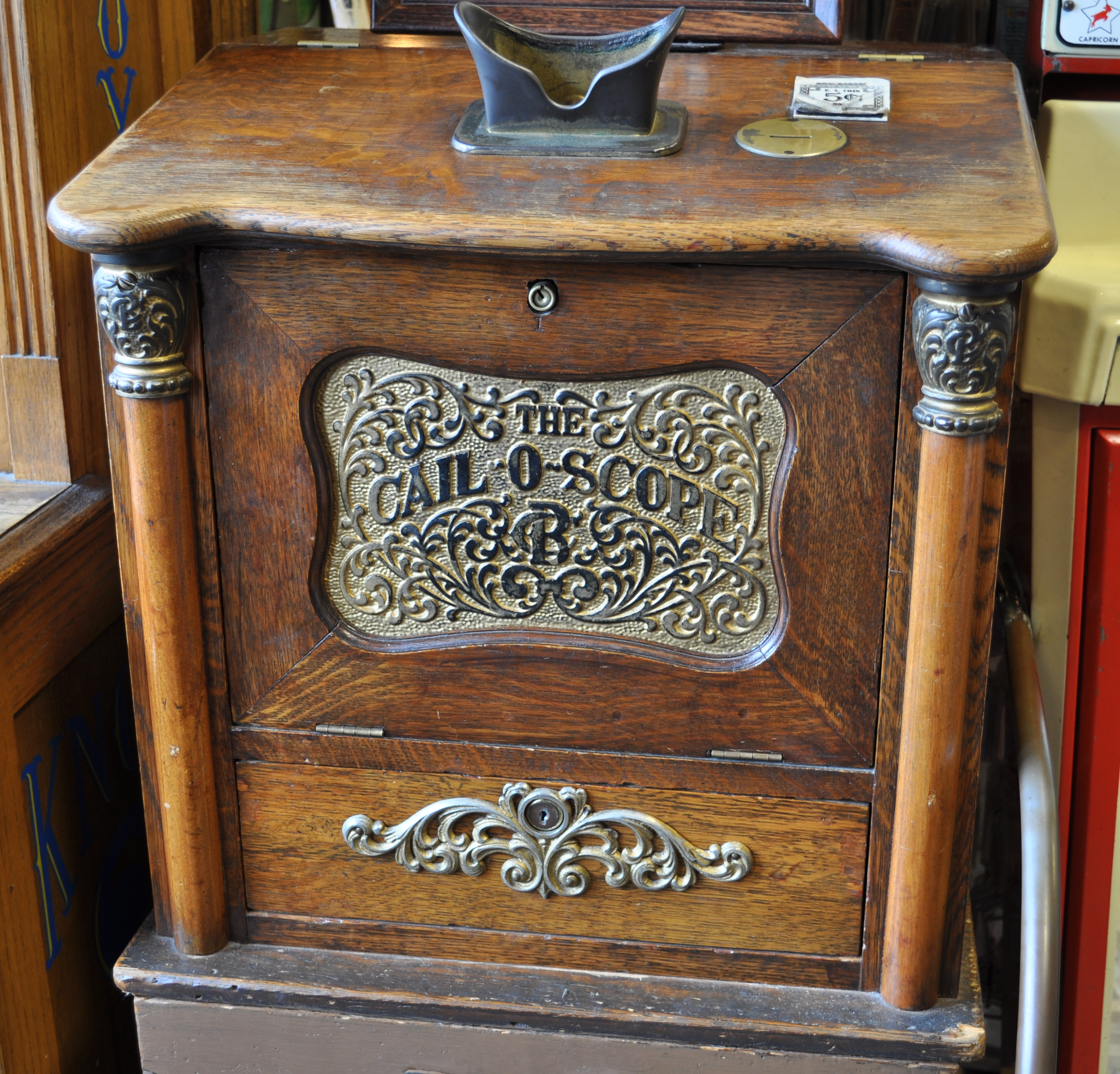
Cail-O-Scope, manufactured by the Caille Brothers, similar to Thomas Edison's Kinetoscope

- Detroit Floor Wheel (1898)
- Multi Tester (1900s)
- Forty-Five (1900-1909)
- Apollo Muscle Test (1901-1910)
- Black Cat (1902)
- Little Wonder Skill Mach. (1902)
- Log Cabin (1902)
- Caille-O-Scope (1904)
- Mickey Finn (a.k.a. Tug-Of-War) (1904)
- Tower Lifter (1904)
- Centaur (1907)
- Silver Cup (1909-1915)
- Rubber-Neck Blowing Machine (1913)
- Superior Jackpot (1926-1932)
- Silent Sphinx (1931-1933)
