= Milwaukee Junction =

Neighborhood in Detroit, Michigan

Coordinates: 42°22′40″N 83°3′30″W

Milwaukee Junction is an area in Detroit, Michigan, east of New Center. Located near the railroad junction of the Grand Trunk Western Railroad's predecessors Detroit, Grand Haven and Milwaukee Railway and the Chicago, Detroit and Canada Grand Trunk Junction, the area encompasses the streets of East Grand Boulevard to the north, St. Aubin St./Hamtramck Drive to the east, John R Street to the west, and the border following I-94 to the south. Due to the presence of numerous car companies within it at the turn of the 20th century, Milwaukee Junction is considered the "cradle of the Detroit auto industry".

== History ==
The Milwaukee Junction neighborhood was constructed in the 1890s to encourage industrial expansion in what was then the far northern section of Detroit. The area was originally a producer of wooden horse carriages, but it soon became a hub of early auto body manufacturing, providing steel frames for the fledgling auto manufacturers. Fisher Auto Body, having a significant presence here, with both Plant 21 and Plant 23 on Piquette Street alone, originally produced wooden horse carriages and was one of the early companies to supply steel auto bodies. Other auto parts companies opened in this area not only because of its many auto company manufacturers, but also because of the confluence of the two major railroad lines, making it efficient to ship cars and parts throughout the US. Auto manufacturers who moved into the area included Anderson Electric Car Company, Brush Motor Car Company, Cadillac, Dodge, Everitt-Metzger-Flanders (E-M-F), Hupp, Packard, Oakland, Studebaker, and Regal. Ford Motor Company also established a presence in Milwaukee Junction when it opened the Piquette Avenue Plant. This was the factory where the Ford Model T was first built before being mass-produced in neighboring Highland Park at the Highland Park Ford Plant. Henry Ford also conducted experiments in assembly line production at the Piquette Avenue Plant, which was used later in Highland Park. Earlier models of the Ford line were also conceived and produced there, including the Ford Model N.

The dominance of Milwaukee Junction in the auto industry lasted until the 1920s. It is now considered the "cradle of the Detroit auto industry".

The attraction of this railroad junction continues into even modern times, with Cadillac building the Poletown Plant adjacent to the junction in the early 1980s. It is almost on the site of the original 1908 Cadillac Motor Car Assembly Plant assembly plant, and less than 5 miles away from the "Cadillac Main" Detroit Assembly built in 1920 within the "V" of another railroad junction (at Junction Street) on the same Grand Trunk Western line.

== Current service ==
The junction is still heavily used by freight and passenger rail today. Three lines of the Grand Trunk Western Railroad, a US subsidiary of the Canadian National Railway, meet at the junction: The Shore Line Subdivision coming in from the southwest, the Holly Subdivision from the northwest, and the Mt. Clemens Subdivision from the northeast. The Detroit Connecting Railroad comes in from the south and interchanges with the GTW's Shore Line and Mt. Clemens subdivisions. The Conrail North Yard Branch, shared by CSX Transportation and the Norfolk Southern Railway, also crosses the site coming in from the southwest paralleling GTW's Shoreline and Mt. Clemens subdivisions, but does not interchange with any railways in the junction. Trains of Amtrak's Wolverine service pass through the junction six times a day, using the GTW's Shore Line and Holly subdivisions.

== See also ==
- Neighborhoods in Detroit
- New Amsterdam Historic District
- Piquette Avenue Industrial Historic District

Preceding station	SEMTA	Following station
Detroit Terminus	Silver Streak	Chrysler Center toward Pontiac
Preceding station	Grand Trunk Western Railroad	Following station
Gratiot Avenue toward Detroit	Detroit and Milwaukee Division	Highland Park toward Grand Haven
Gratiot Avenue toward Detroit	Suburban Service (Detroit)	Highland Park toward Pontiac
Gratiot Avenue toward Detroit	Detroit – Port Huron	Forest Lawn toward Port Huron
