= Detroit Line (Norfolk Southern) =

- Map

Overview
- Status: Active
- Owner: Norfolk Southern
- Locale: Michigan
- Termini: Toledo; Monroe

Service
- Type: Freight rail
- System: Norfolk Southern
- Operator(s): Norfolk Southern

Technical
- Number of tracks: 1-2
- Track gauge: 4 ft 8 1/2 in (1,435 mm) standard gauge

The Detroit Line is a freight railroad line owned and operated by the Norfolk Southern Railway in the U.S. states of Michigan and Ohio.

== Description ==
The line begins south of Gibraltar Road in Gibraltar, Michigan as a continuation of the Conrail Detroit Line, and runs southwest to Toledo, Ohio, consisting of two separate and parallel tracks. Track #1 is the southbound track originally owned by the Lake Shore & Michigan Southern Railway. Track #2 parallels Track #1 to the east running from adjacent to 0.5 miles (0.80 km) apart, and is the northbound track originally owned by Michigan Central Railroad. Track #2 is paralleled directly to its east by the CN/GTW Shore Line Subdivision from the start of the line at Gibraltar Road to Vienna Junction just north of the Michigan–Ohio state line. The Detroit Line's southern end is at the Chicago Line at Air Line Junction in western Toledo.

== History ==
The Detroit, Monroe and Toledo Railroad opened a line from Detroit to Toledo in 1856. The Toledo, Canada Southern and Detroit Railway opened a parallel line, just to the east, in 1873. With the 1930 lease of the Michigan Central Railroad by the New York Central Railroad, both lines were placed under NYC operation. The lines passed to Conrail, and were assigned to Norfolk Southern in Conrail's 1999 breakup; they are now used through a directional running setup, in which southbound trains use the old DM&T and northbound trains use the old TCS&D.
