= Flat engine =

Combustion engine using pistons facing to the sides on a common crankshaft

Animation (with errors) of a boxer engine

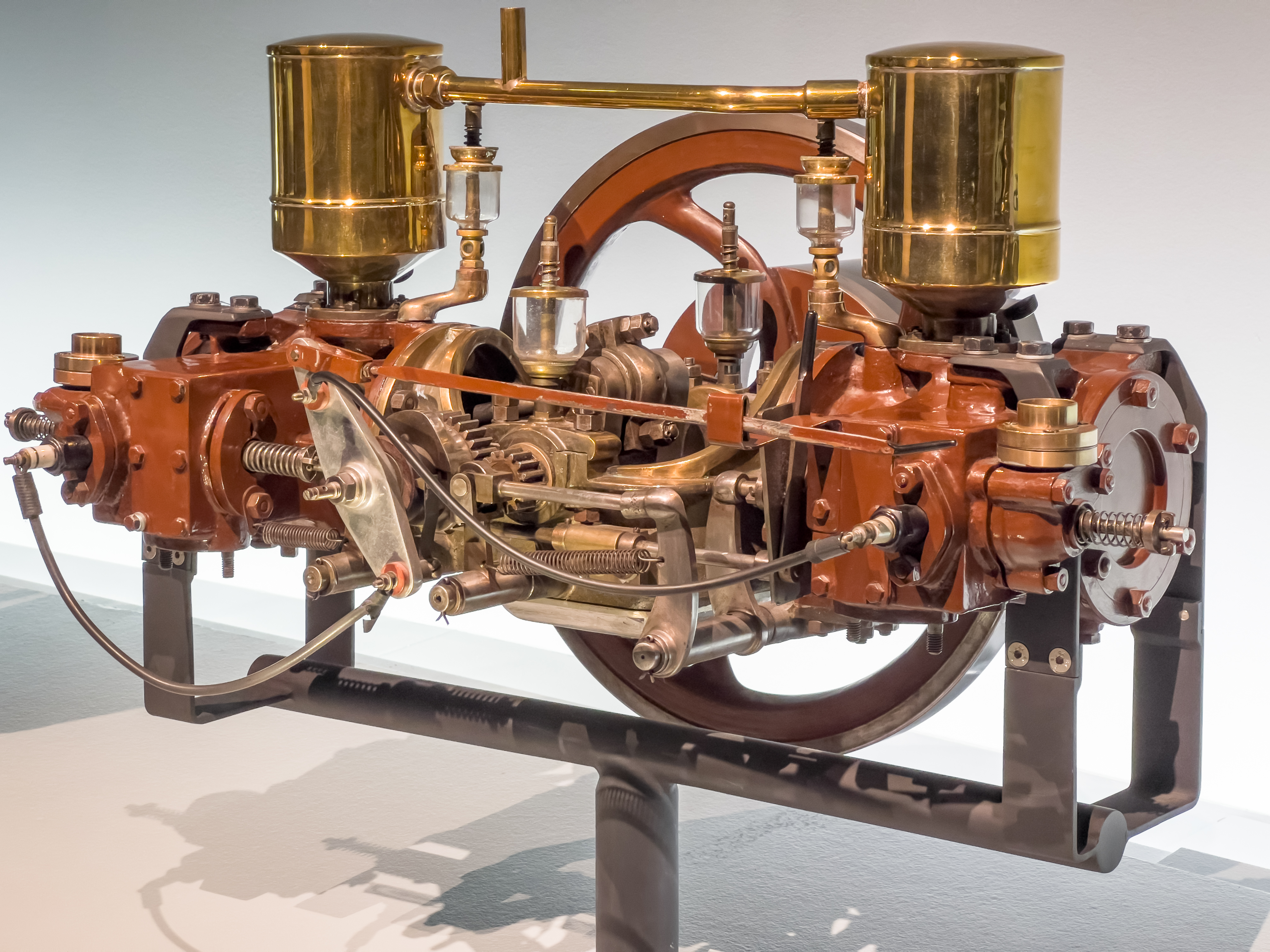
Benz Contramotor, the first commercial flat-engine design, ca. 1899

A flat engine is a piston engine where the cylinders are located on either side of a central crankshaft. Flat engines are also known as horizontally opposed engines, however this is distinct from the less common opposed-piston engine design, whereby each cylinder has two pistons sharing a central combustion chamber.

The most common configuration of flat engines is the boxer engine configuration, in which the pistons of each opposed pair of cylinders move inwards and outwards at the same time. The other configuration is effectively a V engine with a 180-degree angle between the cylinder banks: in this configuration each pair of cylinders shares a single crankpin, so that as one piston moves inward, the other moves outward.

The first flat engine (Benz Contramotor) was built in 1897 by Karl Benz. Flat engines have been used in aviation, motorcycle and automobile applications. They are now less common in cars than straight engines (for engines with fewer than six cylinders) and V engines (for engines with six or more cylinders). Flat engines are more common in aircraft, where straight engines are a rarity and V engines have almost vanished except in historical aircraft. They have even replaced radial engines in many smaller installations.

== Design ==
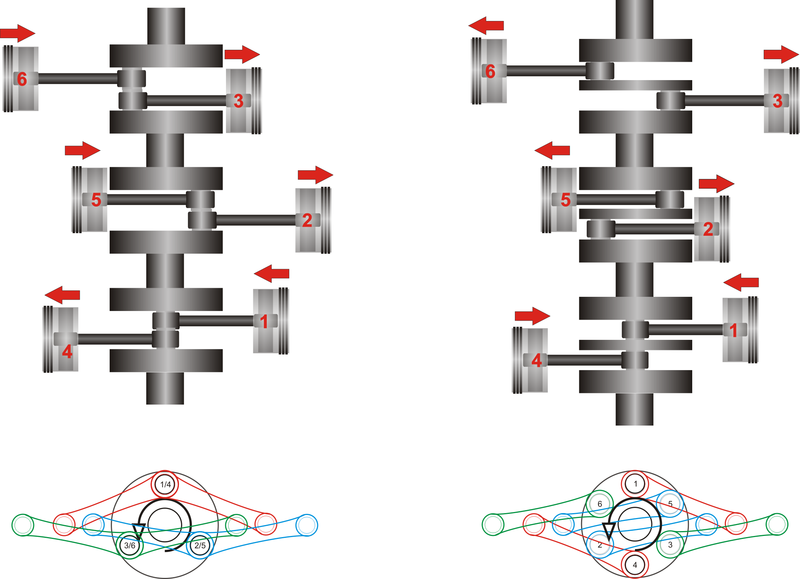
Difference between two flat 6 cylinder engines: 180° V on the left, boxer on the right

The advantages of flat engines are a short length, low centre of mass and suitability for air cooling (due to the well-exposed, large-surface-area cylinders and cylinder heads, and their short length).

Compared with the more common straight engines, flat engines have better primary balance (resulting in less vibration); however, the disadvantages are increased width and the need to have two cylinder heads. Compared with V engines – the most common layout for engines with six cylinders or more – flat engines again have a lower centre of mass, and, for six-cylinders, better primary balance; the disadvantage is again their being wider.

The most common usages of flat engines are:

- Flat-twin engines are mostly used in motorcycles. Occasionally they have been used in light cars, aircraft and industrial applications, mostly up until the 1960s.
- Flat-four engines are mostly used in cars (most notably in the earlier Volkswagen Types 1 to 4, and by Subaru in most of their models), and have occasionally been used in motorcycles. Their most common use is in smaller single-engine general-aviation aircraft, for which they are still manufactured and used to this day.
- Flat-six engines are mostly used in aircraft and cars (particularly by the Porsche 911 sports car and by Subaru), and have occasionally been used in motorcycles.
- Flat-eight engines have been used in several racing cars, mostly by Porsche in the 1960s.
- Flat-ten engines are not known to have reached production. A prototype road car engine was built by Chevrolet in the 1960s.
- Flat-twelve engines have been used in various racing cars, notably the Porsche 917K, during the 1960s and 1970s, and in Ferrari road cars from 1973 to 1996. The Panhard EBR armoured car is one of the few military vehicles to have used such an engine.
- Flat-sixteen engines are not known to have reached production. Prototype racing car engines were built by Coventry Climax and Porsche in the 1960s and 1970s.

=== Boxer configuration ===
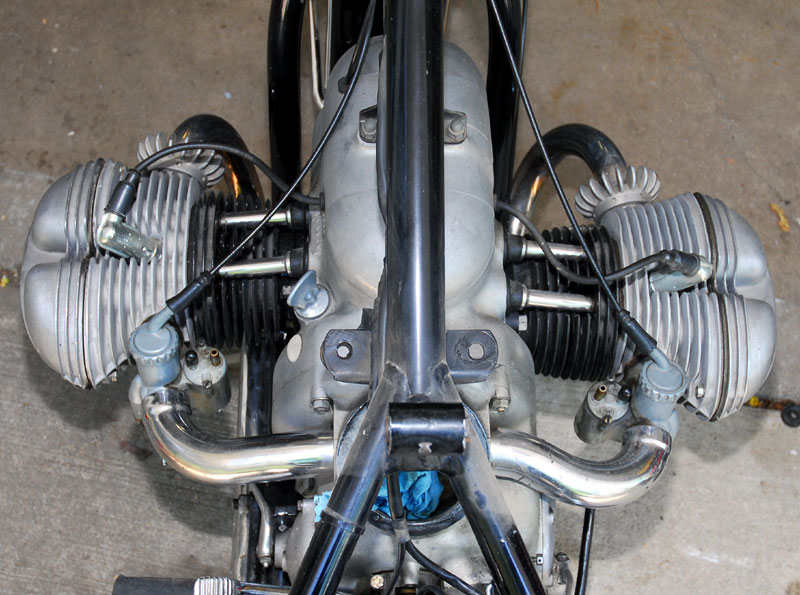
1954 BMW R68 flat-twin boxer engine

Most flat engines use a "boxer" configuration, where each pair of opposing pistons move inwards and outwards at the same time, somewhat like boxing competitors punching their gloves together before a fight. Boxer engines have low vibration, being the only common configuration that has no unbalanced forces, regardless of the number of pairs of cylinders. Boxer engines therefore do not require either a balance shaft or counterweights on the crankshaft to balance the weight of the reciprocating parts. However, a rocking couple is present, since each cylinder is slightly offset from the other member of its pair due to the distance between the crankpins along the crankshaft.

=== 180-degree V engine ===
An alternative configuration for flat engines is as a 180-degree V engine, which has been used on most twelve-cylinder flat engines. In this configuration, each pair of pistons shares a crankpin, this being simpler than the boxer configuration, where each piston has its own separate crankpin.

== Aviation use ==
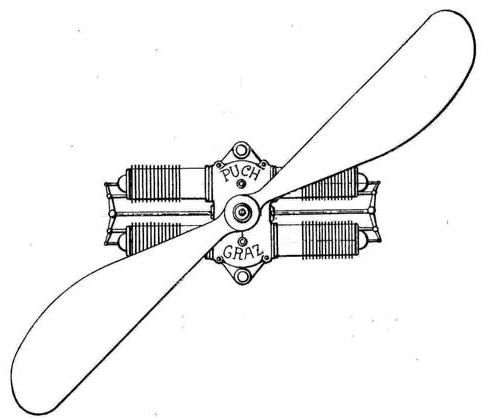
Twin-boxer of Johann Puch, Patent AT 48877 (1909)

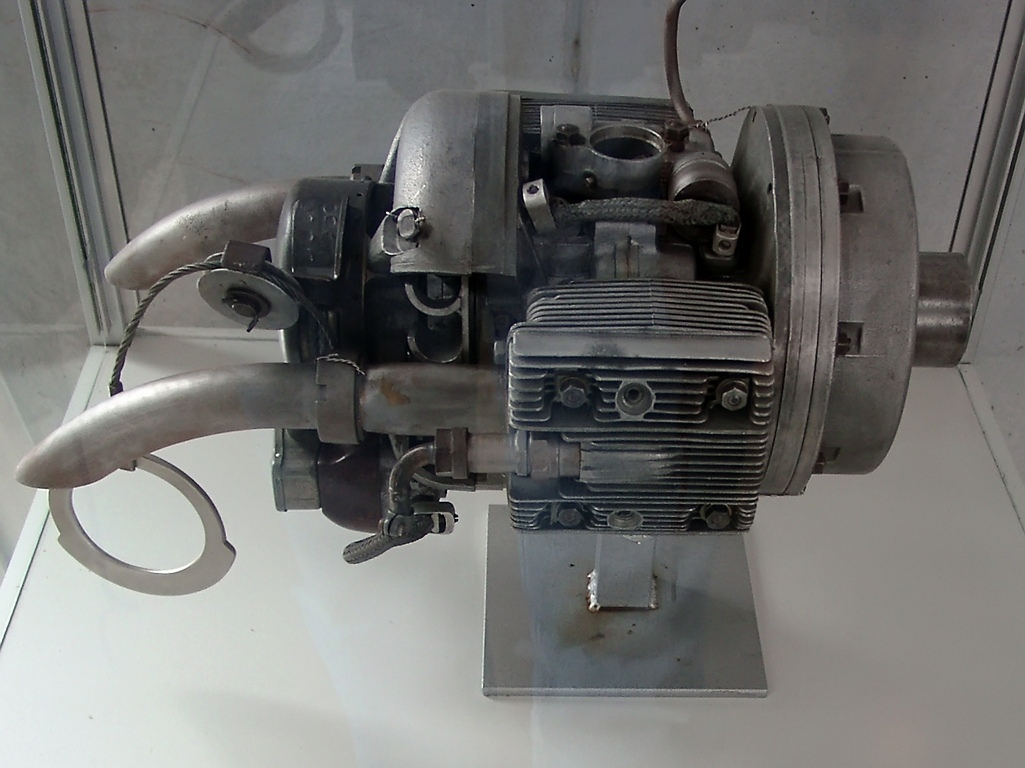
World War II-era Riedel starter motor

In 1902, the Pearse monoplane (which would later become one of the first aircraft to achieve flight) was powered by a flat-twin engine. Amongst the first commercially produced aircraft to use a flat engine was the 1909 Santos-Dumont Demoiselle range of aeroplanes, which was powered by boxer-twin engines.

Several boxer-four engines have been produced specifically for light aircraft. A number of manufacturers produced boxer-six aircraft engines during the 1930s and 1940s.

During World War II, a boxer-twin engine called the "Riedel starter" was used as a starter motor/mechanical APU for the early German jet engines, such as the Junkers Jumo 004 and BMW 003. Designed by Norbert Riedel, these engines have a very oversquare stroke ratio of 2:1 so that they could fit within the intake diverter, directly forward of the turbine compressor.

== Motorcycle use ==
Flat engines offer several advantages for motorcycles including a low centre of mass, low vibration, suitability for shaft drive, and equal cooling of the cylinders (for air-cooled engines). The most common design of flat engine for motorcycles is the boxer-twin, beginning with the 1905 Fée flat-twin engine, manufactured by the Light Motors Company, which was the first production motorcycle engine. BMW Motorrad have a long history of boxer-twin motorcycles, beginning in 1923 with the BMW R32

Several motorcycles have been produced with flat-four engines, such as the 1938–1939 Zündapp K800 and the 1974–1987 Honda Gold Wing. In 1987, the Honda Gold Wing engine was upsized to a flat-six design.

== Automotive use ==
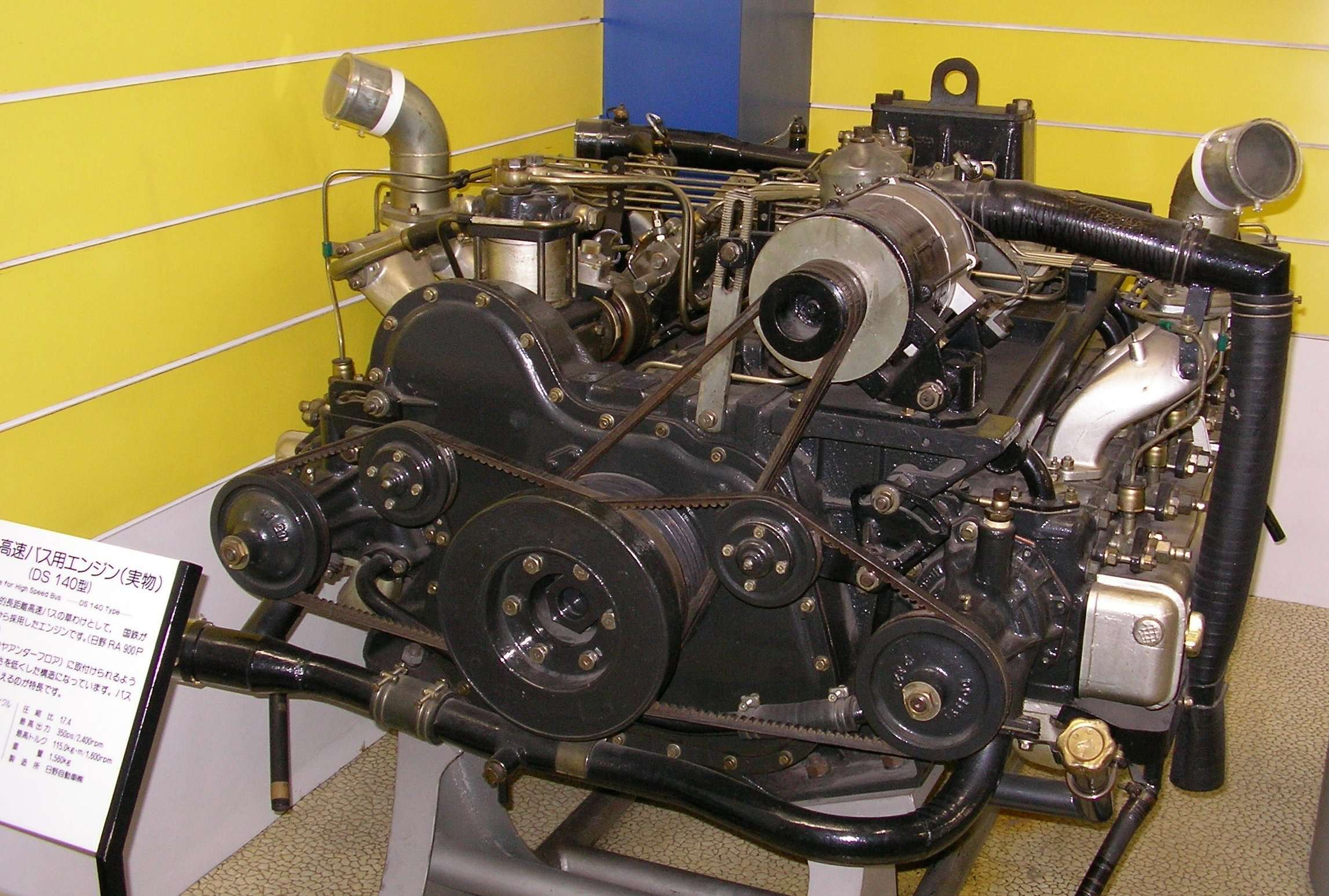
1969 Hino Motors DS140 boxer-twelve diesel engine

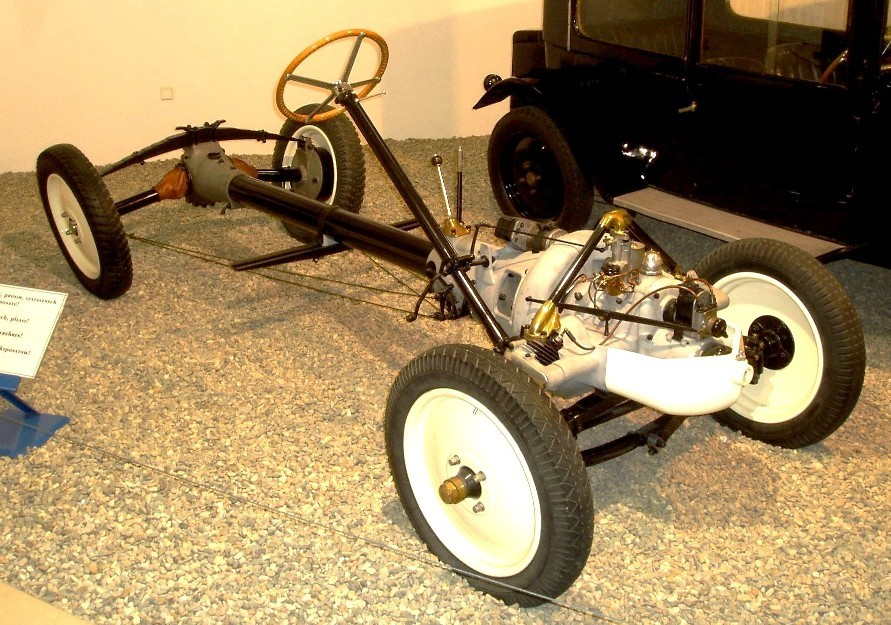
1923-1927 Tatra 11 chassis and engine— front-mounted flat-twin engine with rear-wheel drive

When used in cars, advantages of flat engines are a low centre of mass (which improves the handling of the car), short length, low vibration and suitability for air cooling (due to the well exposed, large surface area, cylinder heads and short length). However the larger width of flat engines (compared with the more common inline and V layouts) is a drawback, particularly when the engine is located between the steered wheels.

Flat engines were used by various automobile manufacturers – mostly with a boxer-four design – up until the late 1990s. Since then, only Porsche and Subaru have remained as significant manufacturers of flat engines.

=== Drivetrain layout ===
Due to the short length of flat engines, locating a flat engine outside of the car's wheelbase results in minimal overhang. Therefore, many cars with flat engines have used a rear-engine, rear-wheel-drive layout. Examples include the flat-twin BMW 600 (1957–1959) and BMW 700 (1959–1965); the flat-four Tatra 97 (1936–1939), Volkswagen Beetle (1938–2003) and Porsche 356 (1948–1965); and the flat-six Chevrolet Corvair (1959–1969), Porsche 911 (1963–present), and Tucker 48 (1947–1948).

The opposite layout, front-engine front-wheel drive, was also common for cars with flat engines. Examples include the Citroën 2CV (1948–1990), Panhard Dyna X (1948–1954), Lancia Flavia (1961–1970), Citroën GS (1970–1986), Alfa Romeo Alfasud (1971–1989) and Subaru Leone (1971–1994).

Subaru have been producing cars with a front-engine, four-wheel-drive layout powered by flat engines (mostly boxer-four engines) since 1971. Examples include the Subaru Leone (1971–1994), Subaru Legacy (1989-2025) and Subaru Impreza (1992–present). The front half-shafts come out of a front differential that is part of the gearbox. A rear driveshaft connects the gearbox to the rear half-shafts.

The traditional front-engine, rear-wheel-drive layout is relatively uncommon for cars with flat engines, however some examples include the Toyota 86 / Subaru BRZ (2012–present), Jowett Javelin (1947–1953), Glas Isar (1958–1965) and the Tatra 11 (1923–1927).

=== History ===
Boxer-four engines

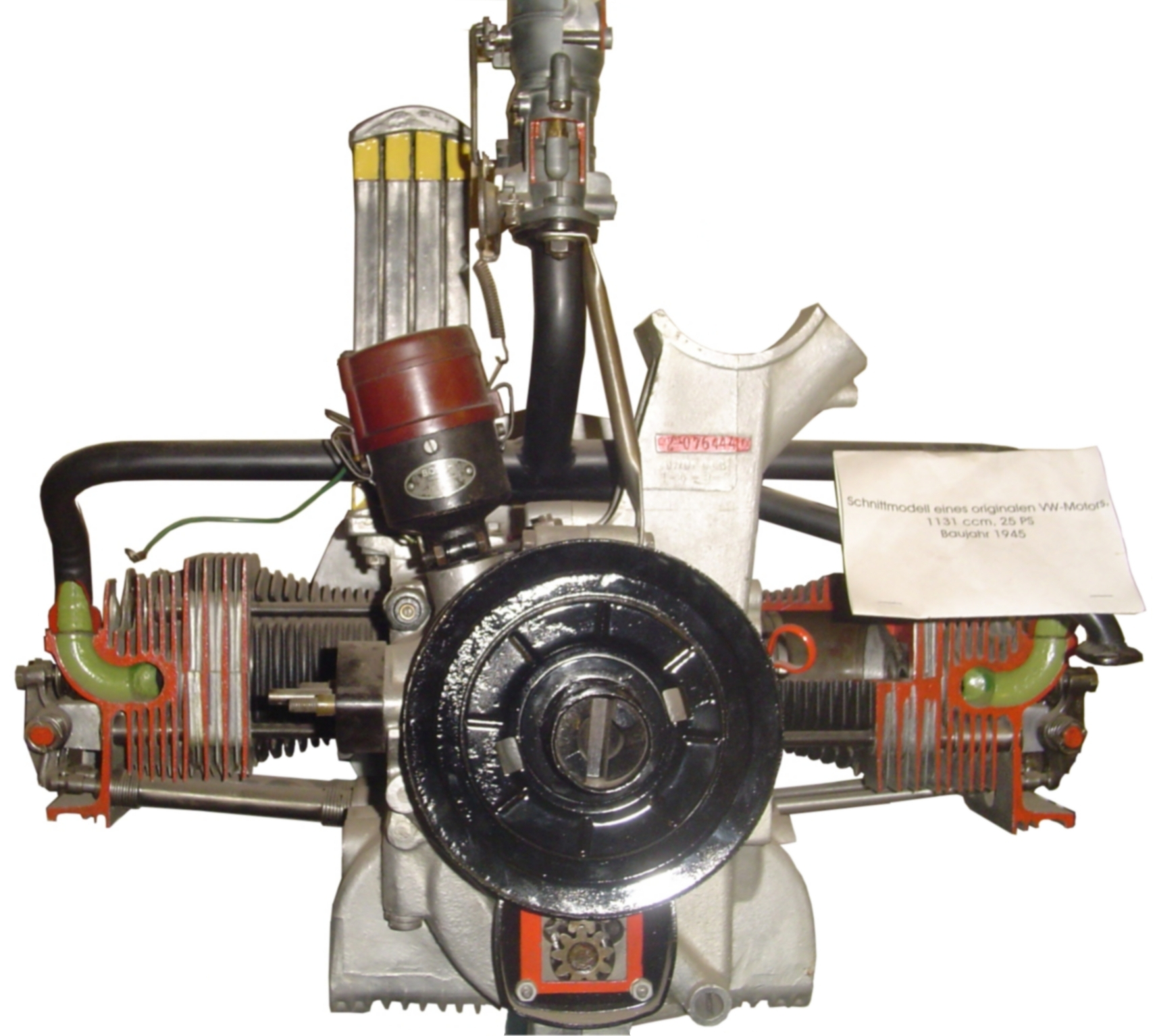
1936–2006 Volkswagen air-cooled

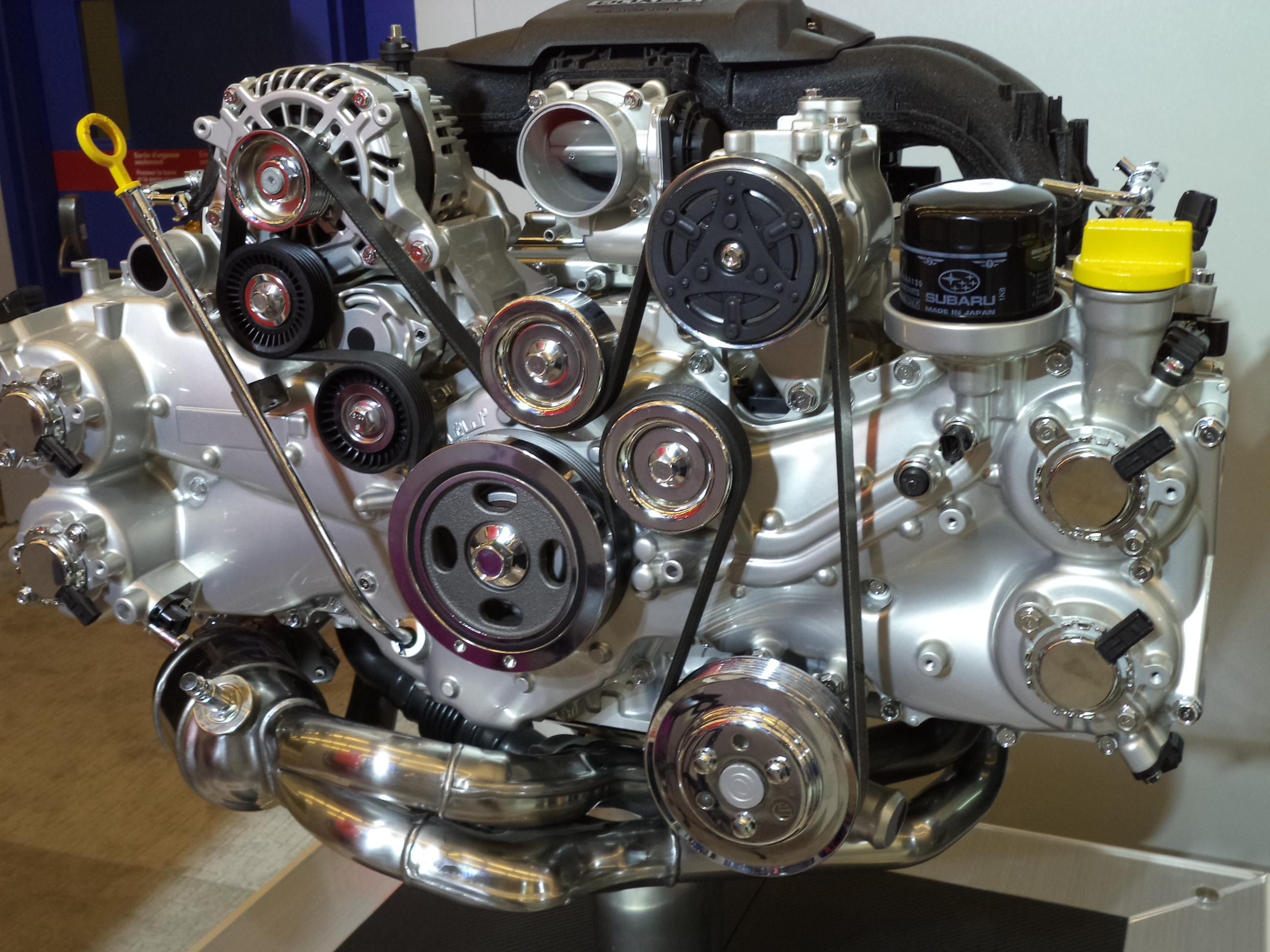
2012–present Subaru FA20

The first flat engine was produced in 1897 by German engineer Karl Benz. Called the kontra engine, it was a boxer-twin design. Early uses of flat engines in cars include the 1900 Lanchester 8 hp Phaeton boxer-twin, the 1901 Wilson-Pilcher boxer-four, the 1904 Wilson-Pilcher 18/24 HP boxer-six and the 1903 Ford Model A, the 1904 Ford Model C and the 1905 Ford Model F.

In 1938, the Volkswagen Beetle (then called the "KdF-Wagen") was released with a rear-mounted flat-four engine. This Volkswagen air-cooled engine was produced for many years and also used in the Volkswagen Type 2 (Transporter, Kombi or Microbus), the Volkswagen Karmann Ghia sports car and the Volkswagen Type 3 compact car. A water-cooled version, known as the Wasserboxer, was introduced in 1982 and eventually replaced the air-cooled versions.

Most Porsche sports cars have been powered by flat engines, starting with its first car: the 1948–1965 Porsche 356 used an air-cooled boxer-four engine. Also using boxer-fours were the 1969–1976 Porsche 914, the 1965–1969 Porsche 912, and the 2016–present Porsche Boxster/Cayman (982). The Porsche 911 has exclusively used boxer-six engines since its introduction, from 1964–present. In 1997, the Porsche 911 changed from being air-cooled to water-cooled.

Porsche flat-eight engines were used in various racing cars throughout the 1960s, such as the 1962 Porsche 804 Formula One car and the 1968–1971 Porsche 908 sports car. Porsche made a flat-twelve engine for the 1969–1973 Porsche 917 sports car.

Chevrolet used a horizontally opposed air-cooled 6 cylinder engine in its Corvair line during its entire production run from 1960–1969 in various applications and power ratings, including one of the first uses of a turbocharger in a mass-produced automobile.

The Subaru EA engine was introduced in 1966 and began Subaru's line of boxer-four engines that remain in production to this day. Most of Subaru's models are powered by a boxer-four engine in either naturally aspirated or turbocharged form. A print ad for the 1973 Subaru GL coupe referred to the engine as "quadrozontal". The company also produced boxer-six engines from 1988–1996 and 2001–2019. In 2008, the Subaru EE engine became the world's first passenger car diesel boxer engine. This engine is a turbocharged boxer-four with common rail fuel injection.

Ferrari used flat-12 engines for various Formula One cars in the 1970s. A road car flat-twelve engine (using a 180-degree V12 configuration) was used for the 1973–1984 Ferrari Berlinetta Boxer, 1984–1996 Ferrari Testarossa and their derivatives.

Toyota uses the designation Toyota 4U-GSE for the boxer-four engine in the Toyota-badged versions of the Toyota 86 – Subaru BRZ twins, although the engine is designed and built by Subaru as the Subaru FA20.

== See also ==
- H engine
- V engine
- W engine
- X engine
- Radial engine
- History of the internal combustion engine
