= József Galamb =

Hungarian-American mechanical engineer

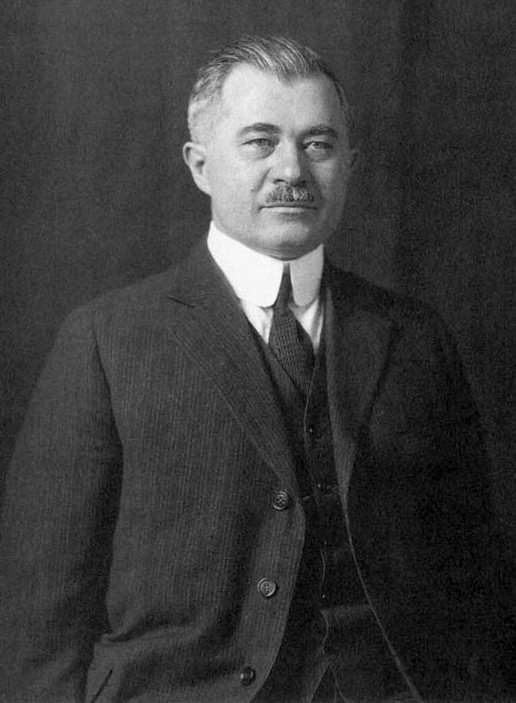
- Galamb c. 1927
- Born: 3 February 1881; Makó, Austria-Hungary
- Died: 4 December 1955 (aged 74); Detroit, Michigan, U.S.
- Known for: Model T
- Scientific career
- Fields: Mechanical engineer

József Galamb (English: Joseph A. Galamb; 3 February 1881 – 4 December 1955) was a Hungarian mechanical engineer, most known as main-engineer for designing the Ford Model T.

Born in the town of Makó in 1881, Galamb finished his education at the Budapest Industrial Technology Engineering Course (the predecessor of the present-day Óbuda University Bánki Donát Politechnical College) in 1899. After receiving his diploma in mechanical engineering he worked at the Steel Engineering Factory in Diósgyőr as a draftsman. He next served one year in military service. He worked at the Hungarian Automobile Co., where he won a postgraduate scholarship to Germany. After the navy he went to see the world – Vienna, Dresden, Berlin, Hamburg and Bremen. In 1903, he worked in many German cities as a skilled worker, he got the best education at Adler in Frankfurt. He was hired to assemble automotive engines in a process in which each engine was built completely by one man. When he learned of the 1904 St. Louis World's Fair, he used his savings to travel to America by ship in October 1903. After two months in New York, he found employment as a toolmaker at the Westinghouse Corporation in Pittsburgh. Although he planned to go back to Germany in 1904, instead he joined the Stearns Automobile Company in Cleveland as a carburetor maker.

Galamb applied for work at the Silent Northern plant, the reorganized Ford-Cadillac plant and the Ford Piquette Avenue Plant. All three offered him work within three hours. He joined the Ford Motor Company (twenty-four years old at that time) as a designer in December 1905. The Ford Motor Company had 300 employees at the time assembling the Ford Model A from purchased parts. Subsequent to redesigning the cooling system for the Model N, he became the chief designer of the company, and devised many of the parts of the famous Model T. From 1915, he worked on the Fordson tractor design. In 1921, he founded a scholarship for the poor students of his native town who wished to take up higher education at trade school. During World War I he was busy designing military hardware, e. g. anti-submarine detection systems. He visited Hungary many times, lecturing at the Association of Hungarian Engineers and Architects. During World War II on Ford's suggestion, he designed a small six-cylinder car, which was completed in 1942. On doctor's orders, he retired from active work in 1944.

His influence played a role in the Ford V8 and Eifel being assembled in Hungary from 1935. He died in 1955 in Detroit.
