= Ford Model N =

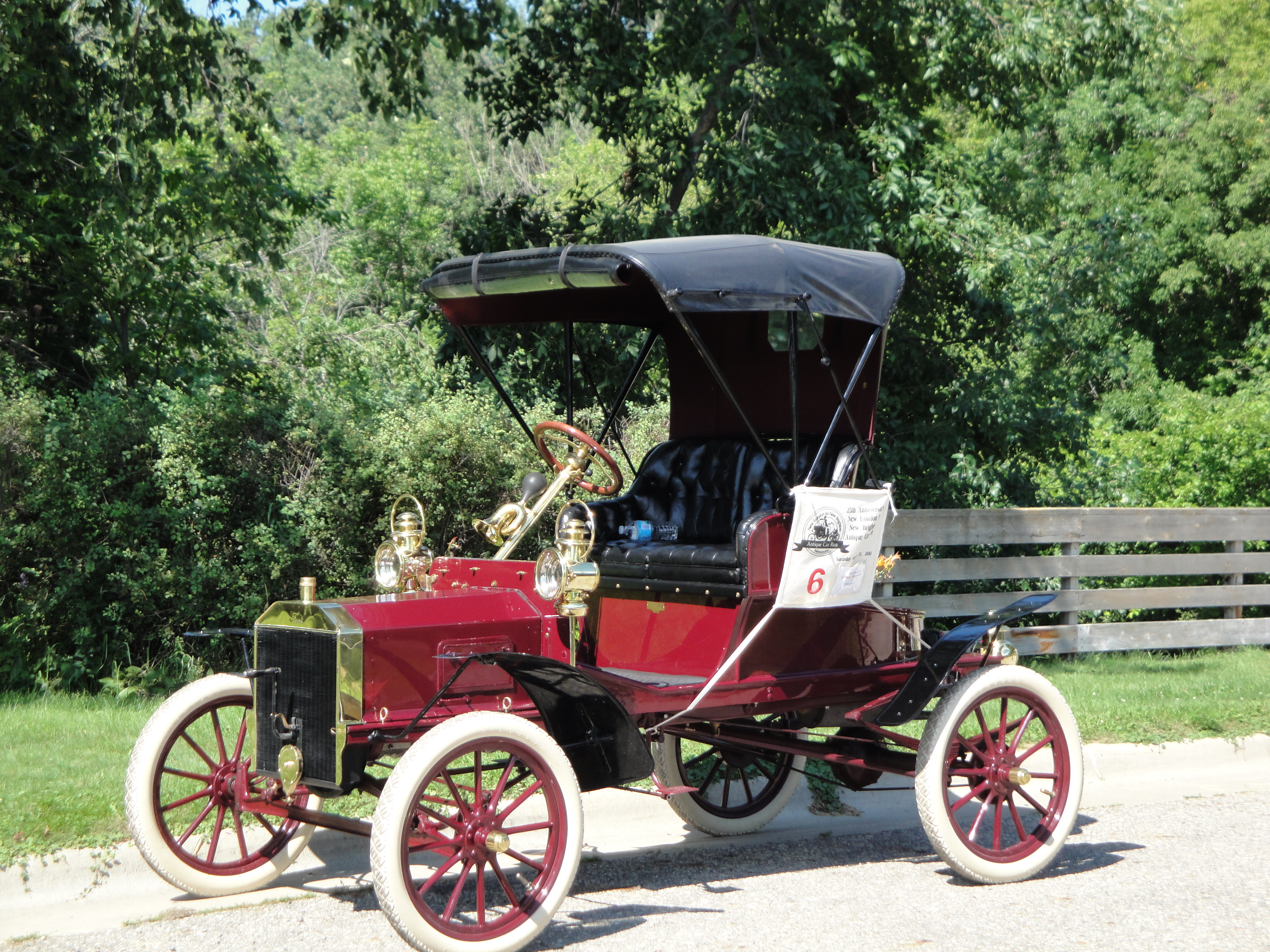

Overview
- Manufacturer: Ford Motor Company
- Also called: Model R Model S
- Production: 1906–1908
- Designer: Henry Ford

Body and chassis
- Class: Entry-level
- Body style: 2-row phaeton

Powertrain
- Engine: 149 cu in (2,440 cc) 15 hp (11 kW; 15 PS) Model N straight-4
- Transmission: 2-speed planetary

Dimensions
- Wheelbase: 84 in (213 cm)
- Curb weight: 800 lb (363 kg) (1906); 1,050 lb (476 kg) (1907 Model N); 1,400 lb (635 kg) (1907 Models R and S)

Chronology
- Predecessor: Ford Model F
- Successor: Ford Model T

The Ford Model N is an automobile produced by Ford Motor Company; it was introduced in 1906 as a successor to the Models A and C as the company's inexpensive, entry-level line. It was built at the Ford Piquette Avenue Plant.

The Model N diverged from its predecessors in that it was a front-engine car with a four-cylinder engine. The 15 hp straight-four drove the rear wheels via a long shaft. This was also the first American car to use vanadium steel. The car had a wheelbase of 84 in (2,100 mm).

A successful model, 7000 cars were made before production ended in 1908. At US$500, the car was viewed as highly affordable at the time; by contrast, the high-volume Oldsmobile Runabout went for $650, Western's Gale Model A was $500, the Brush Runabout $485, the Black $375, and the Success for $250. Maroon was the only factory color for the Model N.

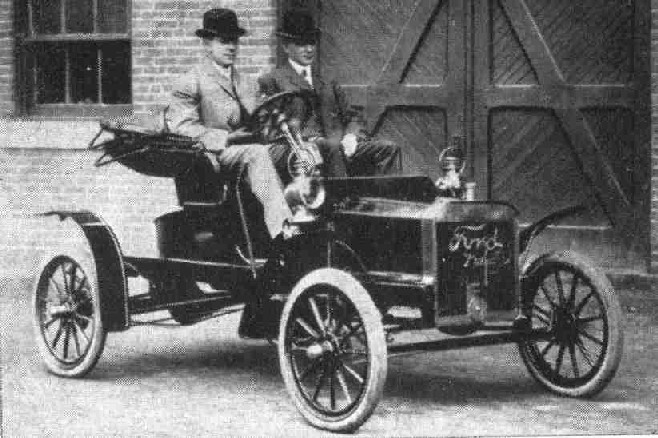
Henry Ford riding in a Model N in front of the Ford Piquette Avenue Plant in Detroit, c. 1906

== Model R ==
The Model R was a higher trim level of the Model N with a larger body, wheels covered by full fenders, running boards, and oil lamps. Model R was $650, $150 above the $500 base Model N. The Model R was a 1907 model year offering, and 2500 were sold. Color was primarily dark green, with leather seats, brass fixtures, and a fuel tank holding 8 US gal (6.7 imp gal; 30 L). Other differences from the Model N included 30-inch (760 mm) tires, a rounded trunk, and a McCord mechanical oiler, rather than the Model N-style exhaust pressure oiler.

== Model S ==
Two Model S styles were produced, a runabout and a roadster. The S runabout first appeared late in the 1907 model year, and was similar to the Model R, selling for $50 less than the R, at $700. Both models were sold for a short time before the R was discontinued for model/fiscal year 1908. The S roadster, like the R, had fenders attached to running boards, and a mechanical oiler. Differences from the R included Model N-style 28-inch tires and the pointed trunk.

The Model S Roadster was based on the same chassis as models N, R, and S runabout before it. Making its appearance during Ford fiscal/model year 1908, the S Roadster had an enclosed cowl, full fenders and fender aprons, and a third "rumble" seat. Like R and S runabouts, the SR used a McCord pressure oiler. Like Model R, the S Roadster was equipped with 30-inch tires. The S Roadster and Model K Roadster were the last models produced during the summer of 1908 as Ford retooled and prepared for the advent of the Model T. The S Roadster sold for $750. Extras such as a convertible top, gas lamps, and umbrella holders were available. 3,750 S Roadsters were sold between 1908 and 1909.
