= Tonneau (disambiguation) =

A tonneau is an area of a car or truck open at the top, when first instituted the tonneau was a pair of high-sided barrel-shaped seats, usually detachable additions to a roadster.

Tonneau may also refer to:

- Tonneau (wine barrel), oak barrels for winemaking
- Tonneau (unit), a former unit of mass in the US
