= Ford Model A =

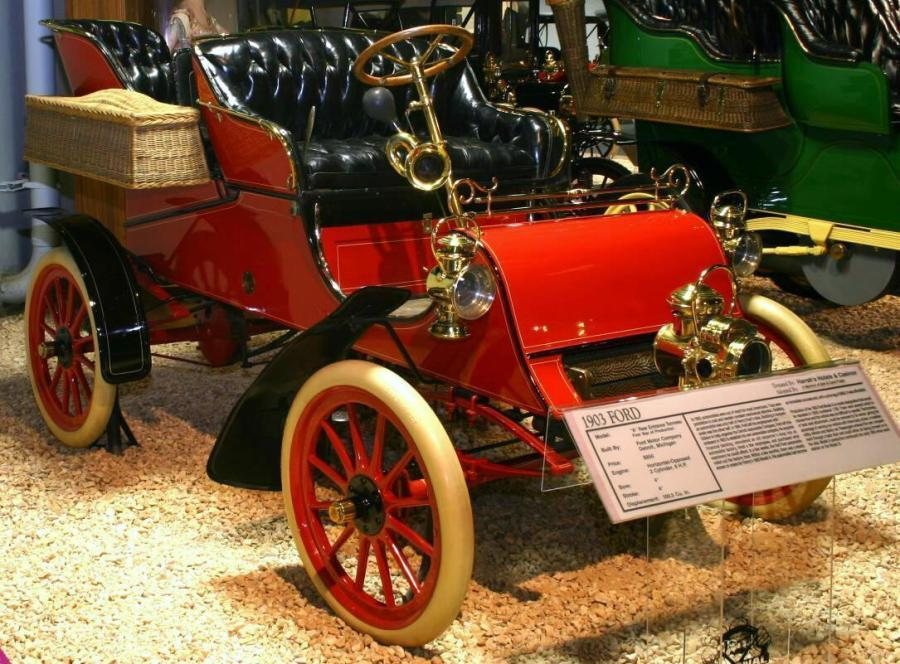
1903 Ford Model A

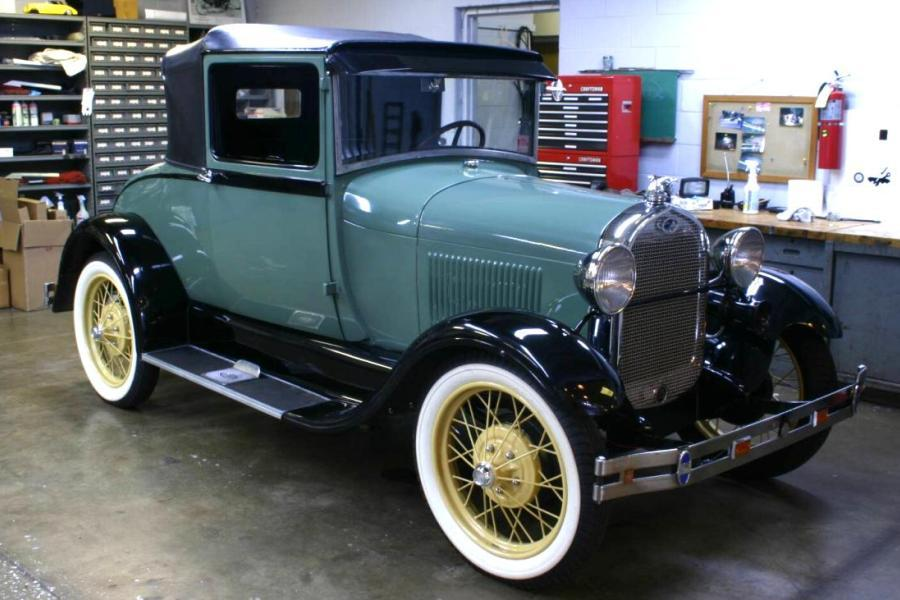
1928 Ford Model A Business Coupe

The Model A is the designation of two cars made by Ford Motor Company, one in 1903 and one beginning in 1927:

- Ford Model A (1903–1904)
- Ford Model A (1927–1931)
