= Ford Mack Avenue Plant =

Motor vehicle assembly plant

Coordinates: 42.3624°N 83.0183°W

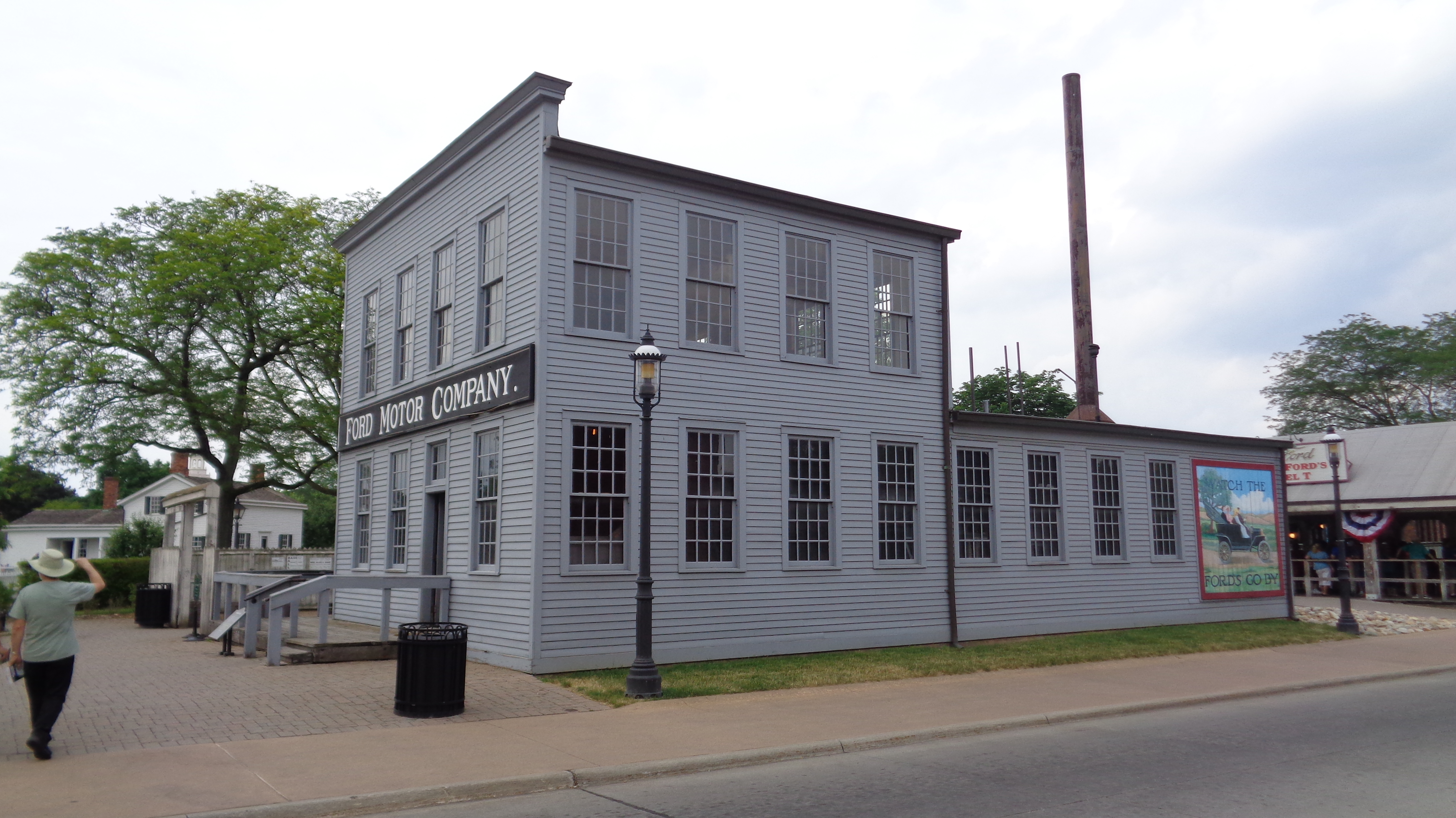
The Mack Avenue Plant replica at Greenfield Village

The Ford Mack Avenue Plant, a rented wagon manufacturing shop in Detroit, Michigan, was the first facility used by the Ford Motor Company to assemble automobiles. Henry Ford began to occupy the facility in April 1903 in preparation for the company's incorporation, which occurred on June 16, 1903. Production of the original Ford Model A began that same month after the incorporation. Soon after, the building was expanded and a second story was added to increase production. The Model A was followed by the Model AC, which was a Model A with the larger Ford Model C engine. Most of the major car components were manufactured by outside companies, including the "running gear" (the chassis, engine, transmission, drive shaft, and axles), which was supplied by the Dodge Brothers Company. A total of 1,708 cars (670 Model A's and 1,038 Model AC's) were assembled at the Mack Avenue Plant. The company occupied the building until October 1904, when its manufacturing operations were moved to the Ford Piquette Avenue Plant in Detroit, where the Ford Model T would later be built.

The Mack Avenue Plant's address was originally 588–592 Mack Avenue when Ford Motor Company occupied the building. Its address became 6520 Mack Avenue after the city of Detroit changed its street numbering system in January 1921. The building burned down in August 1941. A replica of the Mack Avenue Plant, one-fourth the size of the original, was built in 1945 at Greenfield Village, an open-air museum in Dearborn, Michigan.

Ford car models assembled at the Mack Avenue Plant
| Car model | Image | Engine | Transmission | Wheelbase | Lowest sale price | Production period | Notes |
|---|---|---|---|---|---|---|---|
| Model A | A red-colored, old-fashioned car with four seats and brass fittings | 8 brake horsepower (6.0 kW) opposed 2-cylinder | 2-speed planetary | 72 inches (182.9 cm) | $850 (equivalent to $30,458 in 2025) | June 1903 (on or after June 16) – December 1903 | Ford Motor Company's first car model. |
| Model AC | A red-colored, old-fashioned car with four seats and brass fittings | 10 brake horsepower (7.5 kW) opposed 2-cylinder | 2-speed planetary | 78 inches (198.1 cm) | $850 (equivalent to $30,458 in 2025) | January 1904 – September 1904 | The Model AC can be visually distinguished from the Model A by its larger six-by-three-bar radiator. |

== See also ==
- List of Ford factories
