= Ford Model F =

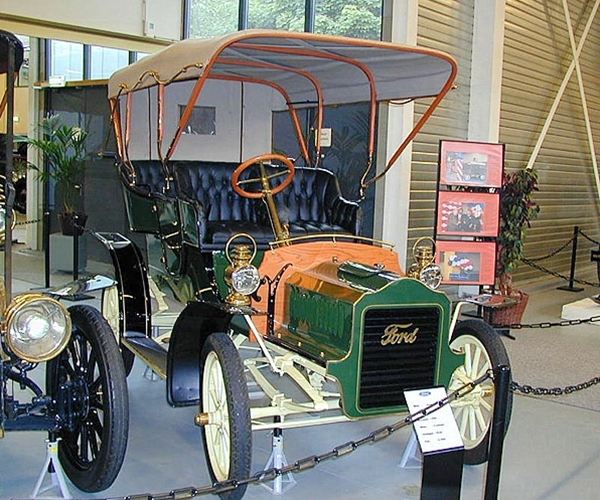

Overview
- Manufacturer: Ford
- Production: 1905–1906
- Designer: Henry Ford

Body and chassis
- Class: Entry-level
- Body style: Side-entrance tonneau

Powertrain
- Engine: 127CID 12 hp Flat-2
- Transmission: 2-speed planetary

Dimensions
- Wheelbase: 84 in (2,100 mm)
- Curb weight: 1,400 lb (640 kg)

Chronology
- Predecessor: Ford Model C
- Successor: Ford Model N

The Ford Model F is an automobile produced by Ford. It was a development of the Model A and Model C, but was larger, more modern, and more luxurious. Production started in 1905 and ended in 1906 after about 1,000 were made. It was built at the Ford Piquette Avenue Plant. It was a four-seater phaeton with running boards and a side-entrance tonneau standard. It was priced from US$1,000 (equivalent to $35,833 in 2025) to US$1,200 (equivalent to $43,000 in 2025).

== Bibliography ==
- Clymer, Floyd (1950). Treasury of Early American Automobiles, 1877-1925. New York: Bonanza Books.
- Lewis, David L. (2005). 100 Years of Ford. Publications International. pp. 18–19. ISBN 0-7853-7988-6.
- "Early Ford - models from the years 1903 - 1908".
