= Ford Piquette Avenue Plant =

Former car factory in Detroit, Michigan

- U.S. National Register of Historic Places
- U.S. Historic district – Contributing property
- U.S. National Historic Landmark
- Michigan State Historic Site
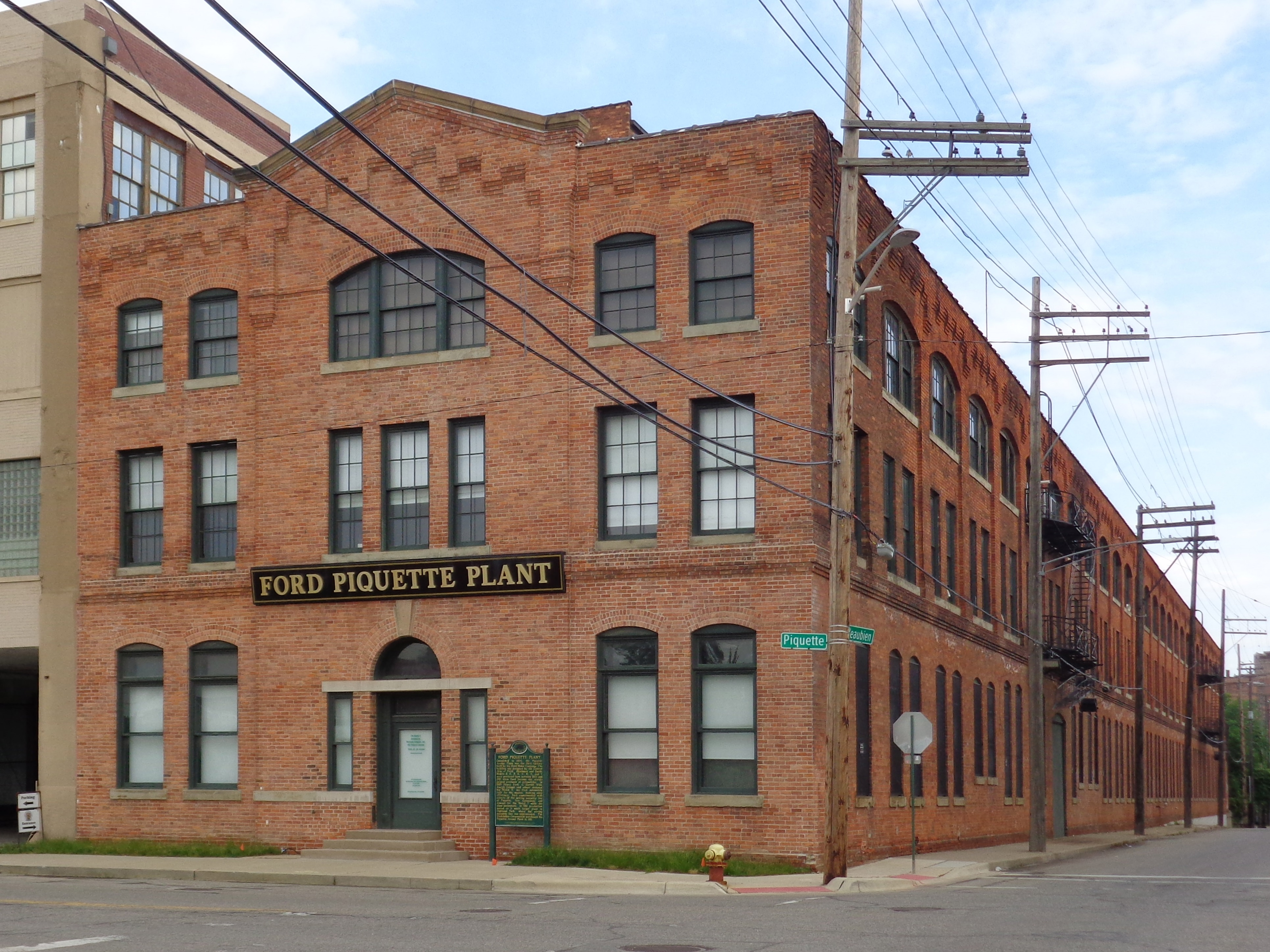
- Exterior of the Piquette Avenue Plant

- Location within Michigan Location within the United States
- Interactive map
- Location: 461 Piquette Avenue; Detroit, Michigan
- Coordinates: 42°22′09″N 83°03′56″W
- Built: 1904; 122 years ago
- Architect: Field, Hinchman & Smith
- Architectural style: Late Victorian
- Visitation: 31,018 (2018)
- Part of: Piquette Avenue Industrial Historic District (ID04000601)
- NRHP reference No.: 02000041

Significant dates
- Added to NRHP: 2002
- Designated CP: 2004
- Designated NHL: 2006
- Designated MSHS: 2003

The Ford Piquette Avenue Plant is a former automobile factory located within the Milwaukee Junction area of Detroit, Michigan, United States. Built in 1904, it was the second center of automobile production for the Ford Motor Company, after the Ford Mack Avenue Plant. At the Piquette Avenue Plant, the company created and first produced the Ford Model T, the car credited with initiating the mass use of automobiles in the United States. Prior to the Model T, several other car models were assembled at the factory. Early experiments using a moving assembly line to make cars were also conducted there. It was also the first factory where more than 100 cars were assembled in one day. While headquartered at the Piquette Avenue Plant, Ford Motor Company became the biggest U.S.-based automaker, and it remained so until the mid-1920s. The factory was used by the company until 1910, when its car production activity was relocated to the new, larger Highland Park Ford Plant.

Studebaker bought the factory in 1911, using it to assemble cars until 1933. The building was sold in 1936, going through a series of owners for the rest of the 20th century before becoming a museum in 2001. The Piquette Avenue Plant is the oldest purpose-built automotive factory building open to the public. The museum, which was visited by over 31,000 people in 2018, has exhibits that primarily focus on the beginning of the United States automotive industry. The building was added to the National Register of Historic Places in 2002, became a Michigan State Historic Site in 2003, and was designated a National Historic Landmark in 2006.

== History ==
=== Ford period ===
Henry Ford, Detroit coal merchant Alexander Y. Malcomson, and a group of investors formed the Ford Motor Company on June 16, 1903, to assemble automobiles. The company's first car model, the original Ford Model A, began to be assembled that same month at the Ford Mack Avenue Plant, a rented wagon manufacturing shop in Detroit, Michigan. The company quickly outgrew this facility and, on April 10, 1904, bought a parcel of land off of Piquette Avenue in Detroit to accommodate a larger factory. The land was located in the Milwaukee Junction area, whose name is derived from a railroad junction within it. The Ford Piquette Avenue Plant's construction started on May 10, 1904. The company moved into its new factory the following October.

The Detroit-based architectural firm Field, Hinchman & Smith designed the Piquette Avenue Plant. It is an example of late Victorian-style architecture and was modeled after New England textile mills. Designing factories based on this type of mill was common practice in the United States at the time. The building is three stories high, 56 feet (17.1 m) wide, and 402 feet (122.5 m) long. Its load-bearing exterior brick walls contain 355 windows, and its maple floors, supported by square oak beams and posts, cover 67,000 square feet (6,224.5 m^{2}). The Piquette Avenue Plant contains two elevator-stairwell combinations, one located on its northwest corner and the other located on its southwest side. Recalling a fire in March 1901 that destroyed the Olds Motor Works factory in Detroit, Henry Ford and the architects included a fire sprinkler system in the building's design, a rare feature for industrial buildings of the period. This and several other original safety features in the factory, such as its firewalls, fire doors, and fire escapes, are still present. Water for the sprinkler system was supplied by a wooden water tank located on the building's roof. A brick powerhouse, measuring 36 feet (11.0 m) wide by 57 feet (17.4 m) long, was the original electricity provider for the factory, and was located near its northwest corner. The water tank and powerhouse no longer exist.

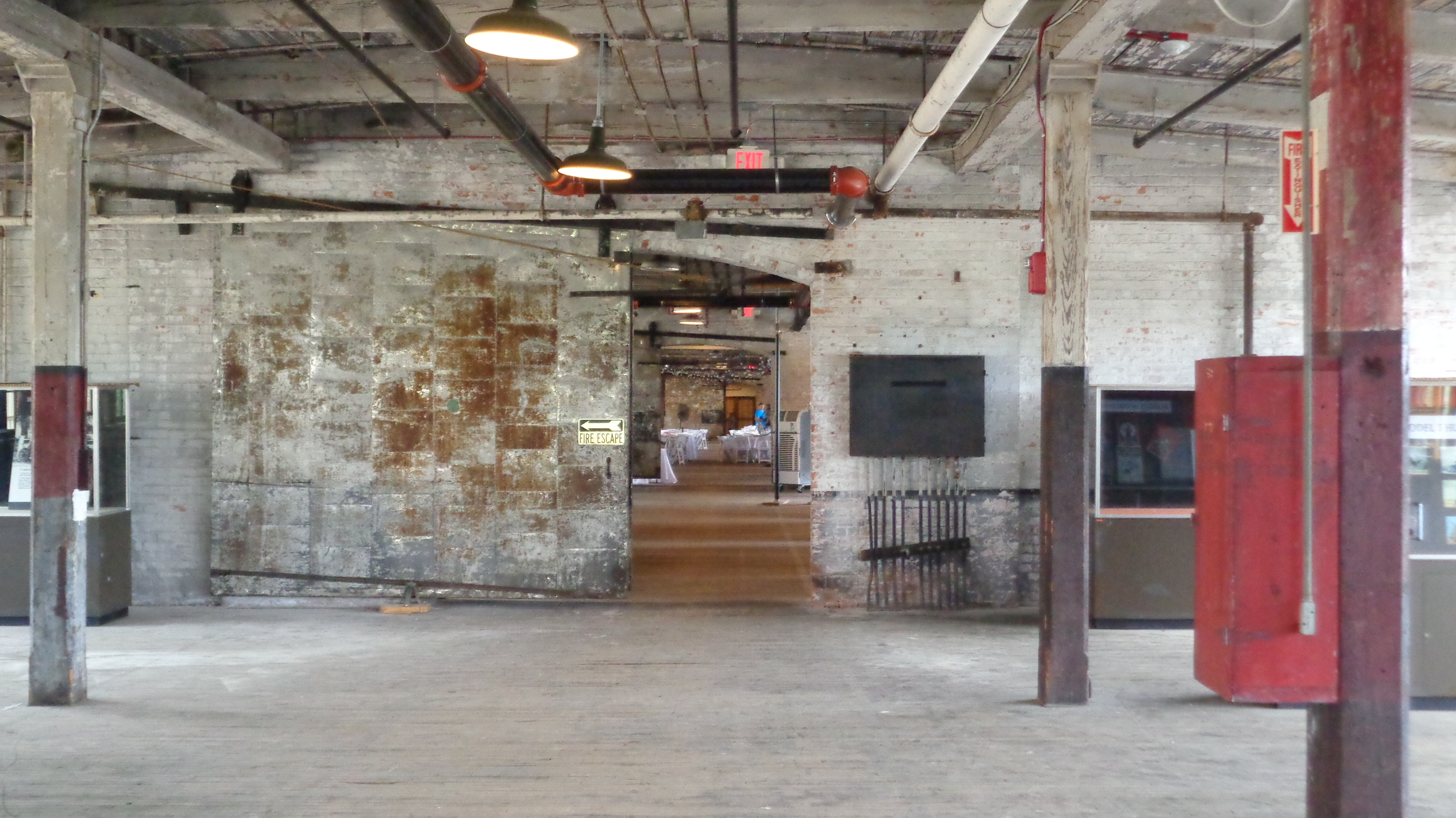
The Piquette Avenue Plant's interior. Note the sliding fire doors at each firewall.

From October 1904 to the end of 1909, Ford Motor Company assembled car models B, C, F, K, N, R, S, and T at the Piquette Avenue Plant. Ford models B and C were the first car models produced at the factory starting in late 1904, and production of the Ford Model F began the following February. Most of the factory tasks were done by men, except for magneto assembly, which was done by women. Hand tools were used for the assembly work at fixed stations, and the completed components would be brought by hand to the chassis for final assembly. Completed cars were shipped to the company's distributors and dealers by rail using a spur line behind the building, which connected to a Michigan Central Railroad main line. Due to variations in demand and car model changeover, the number of employees varied constantly, ranging from as low as 300 to as high as 700. The company did not recognize labor unions at the factory. Ford Motor Company was a member of the Employers’ Association of Detroit, an organization that prevented most of the city's factories from unionizing until the 1930s.

In 1905, Ford Motor Company was the fourth-largest car producer in the United States, behind Cadillac, Rambler, and Oldsmobile. In the company's early years, most major components in its cars were manufactured by outside companies, including the "running gear" (the chassis, engine, transmission, drive shaft, and axles), which was supplied by the Dodge Brothers Company. That began to change in early 1906, when the Ford Manufacturing Company, a new, separate company created by Henry Ford and some Ford Motor Company stockholders, started to make engines and transmissions for the upcoming Ford Model N. The Ford Manufacturing Company was located at the Bellevue Avenue Plant, a leased factory off of Bellevue Avenue in Detroit. The Bellevue Avenue Plant was used until 1908, by which time almost all manufacturing of major components for Ford Motor Company cars was taking place at the Piquette Avenue Plant. Model N production began at the Piquette Avenue Plant in July 1906. That same month, Henry Ford bought the Ford Motor Company shares owned by fellow company co-founder Alexander Malcomson. While Malcomson was with the company, he and Henry Ford disagreed over the type of car that the company should produce. Malcomson preferred expensive cars, like the Ford Model K; Henry Ford favored inexpensive cars, like the Model N. Once Malcomson was no longer part of the company, Henry Ford, now with uncontested control, focused the company's efforts towards making cheap cars exclusively. The success of the Model N made Ford Motor Company the largest automaker in the United States by the end of 1906, a distinction that it would hold for twenty years.

In January 1907, in a room located on the Piquette Avenue Plant's third floor in the northeast corner, the design process began for the Ford Model T, the car credited with starting the mass use of cars in the United States. Much of the design and experimental work for the new car was done by Henry Ford, draftsman Joseph Galamb, engineer Childe Harold Wills, and machinist C.J. Smith. Vanadium steel, an alloy lighter and stronger than standard steel, which was first used sparingly with the Ford Model N, R, and S, was used extensively with the Model T. The company revealed the plans for the Model T to its dealers on March 19, 1908.

During July 1908, a few months before the Model T's introduction, a group of Piquette Avenue Plant employees experimented with the concept of using a moving assembly line to make cars, where the chassis would be moved to the workers for components to be installed. This effort was led by Charles E. Sorensen, the assistant to Peter E. Martin, who was the factory's superintendent. Sorensen believed that a moving assembly line would make car assembly faster, simpler, and easier. The experiments consisted of tying a rope to a Model N chassis and pulling it across the factory's third floor on skids until its axles and wheels were added. The chassis would then be rolled across the floor in notches, where specific components would be attached. At least one Model N was completed at the Piquette Avenue Plant using this process. Although Henry Ford encouraged these experiments, he did not implement a formal moving assembly line at the Piquette Avenue Plant, as all of his attention was focused on getting Model T production started on time. Despite not having a moving assembly line, the Piquette Avenue Plant, aided by the usage of interchangeable parts and other production improvements, produced 101 completed cars in a single day on June 4, 1908, an auto industry record at the time.

The first production Model T was completed at the Piquette Avenue Plant on September 27, 1908. On May 1, 1909, due to overwhelming demand, Ford Motor Company stopped taking Model T orders for two months. To satisfy the unprecedented demand for the Model T, the company moved most of its car production activity to the new, larger Highland Park Ford Plant in Highland Park, Michigan, by January 1910. The company completely vacated the Piquette Avenue Plant by October 1910. The concept of using a moving assembly line to manufacture cars would be fully implemented at the Highland Park Ford Plant, starting on October 7, 1913. Over 15 million Model T's would eventually be built, and the first 14,000 made in the United States were assembled at the Piquette Avenue Plant.

Ford car models assembled at the Piquette Avenue Plant
Car model	Image	Engine	Transmission	Wheelbase	Lowest sale price	Production period	Notes
Model B	A green-colored, old-fashioned car with four seats and brass fittings	24 brake horsepower (17.9 kW) inline 4-cylinder	2-speed planetary	92 inches (233.7 cm)	$2,000 (equivalent to $71,667 in 2025)	Late 1904 – April 1906	First Ford Motor Company car model with the engine mounted in the front, which was intended to match European-style car designs. Rarest of the company's pre-Model-T car models, with only seven known complete units that survive today.
Model C	A red-colored, old-fashioned car with two seats and brass fittings	10 brake horsepower (7.5 kW) opposed 2-cylinder	2-speed planetary	78 inches (198.1 cm)	$800 (equivalent to $28,667 in 2025)	Late 1904 – December 1905	Like the Model A, this car model had its engine mounted under the seat (its European-style hood was a false hood).
Model F	A green-colored, old-fashioned car with four seats and brass fittings	16 brake horsepower (11.9 kW) opposed 2-cylinder	2-speed planetary	84 inches (213.4 cm)	$1,000 (equivalent to $35,833 in 2025)	February 1905 – April 1906	Like the Model A, this car model had its engine mounted under the seat (its European-style hood was a false hood).
Model K	A white-colored, old-fashioned car with four seats and brass fittings	40 brake horsepower (29.8 kW) inline 6-cylinder	2-speed planetary	114–120 inches (289.6–304.8 cm)	$2,500 (equivalent to $89,583 in 2025)	Late 1905 – 1908 (before October)	Wheelbase increased from 114 inches (289.6 cm) to 120 inches (304.8 cm) by 1907. Evidence suggests that this car model's assembly and component production was moved to the Bellevue Avenue Plant by 1908.
Model N	A red-colored, old-fashioned car with two seats and brass fittings	18 brake horsepower (13.4 kW) inline 4-cylinder	2-speed planetary	84 inches (213.4 cm)	$600 (equivalent to $21,500 in 2025)	July 1906 – 1908 (before October)	Best-selling car model in the United States at the time, with over 7,000 units produced. Considered the predecessor of the Model T.
Model R	A green-colored, old-fashioned car with two seats and brass fittings	18 brake horsepower (13.4 kW) inline 4-cylinder	2-speed planetary	84 inches (213.4 cm)	$750 (equivalent to $25,915 in 2025)	February 1907 – 1908 (before October)	An upscale version of the Model N.
Model S	A red-colored, old-fashioned car with three seats and brass fittings	18 brake horsepower (13.4 kW) inline 4-cylinder	2-speed planetary	84 inches (213.4 cm)	$700 (equivalent to $24,187 in 2025)	July 1907 – 1908 (before October)	An upscale version of the Model N.
Model T	A red-colored, old-fashioned car with four seats and brass fittings	22 brake horsepower (16.4 kW); L-head 4-cylinder	2-speed planetary	100 inches (254.0 cm)	$825 (equivalent to $29,562 in 2025)	September 27, 1908 – December 1909	Declared the Car of the Century by an international jury of auto experts in December 1999.

=== After Ford in the 20th century ===
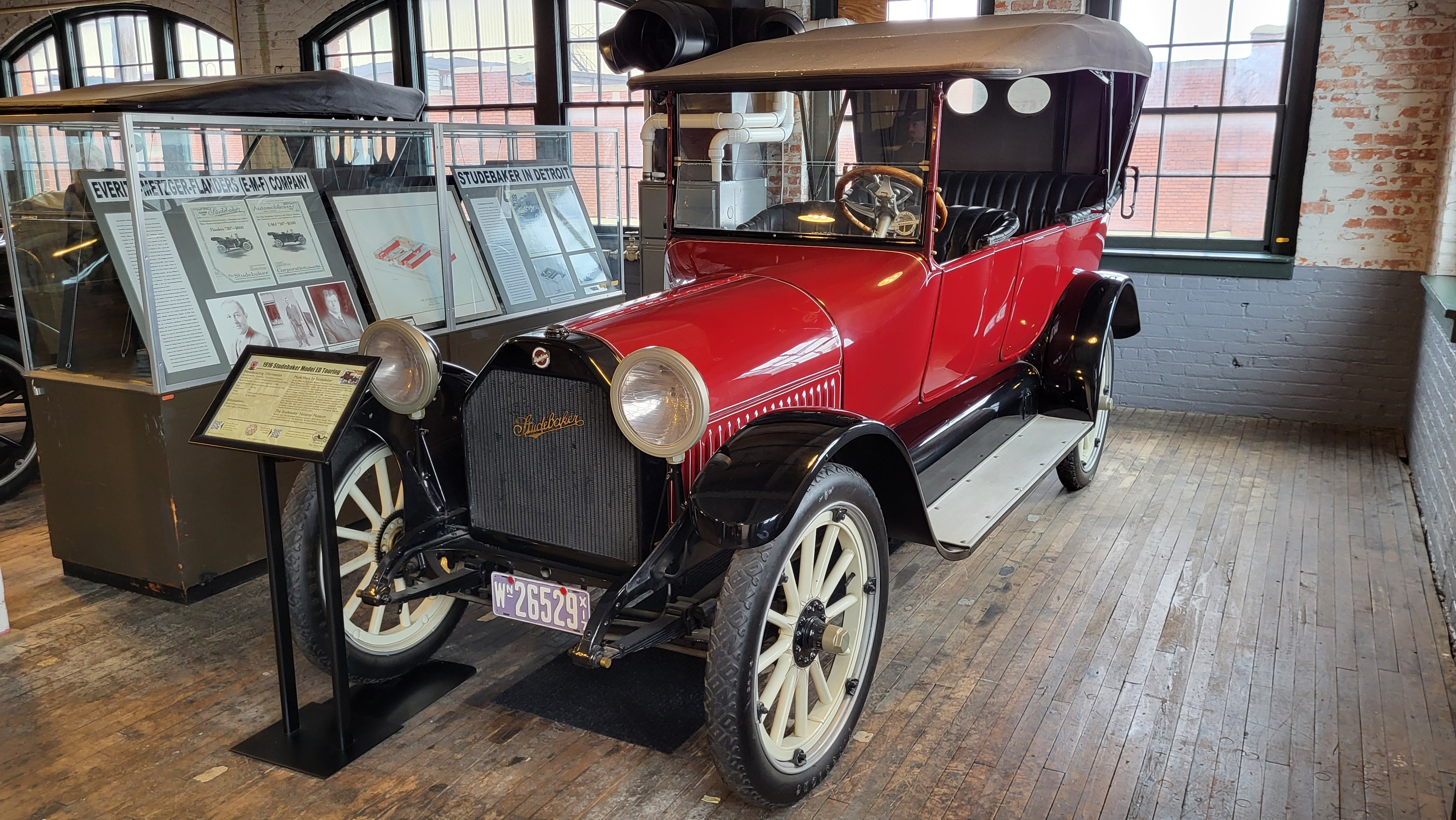
Studebaker assembled cars, like this one, in the Piquette Avenue Plant when it owned the building.

The Ford Piquette Avenue Plant was sold in January 1911 to Studebaker, a major maker of various horse-drawn road vehicles since the 1850s. That same year, when the railroad spur line serving the factory was raised above street level, the loading dock behind the building was replaced with an elevated platform, level with the second floor. Also in 1911, Studebaker acquired the E-M-F Company, which owned a different car manufacturing complex on Piquette Avenue. Studebaker began to put its name on the cars formerly produced by the E-M-F Company in 1912. In 1913, the plant was one of the sites affected by the 1913 Studebaker strike, the automotive industry's first major labor strike. In 1920, Studebaker built a four-story, reinforced concrete building, known as the Studebaker Detroit Service Building, immediately west of the Piquette Avenue Plant. In 1926, the elevator-stairwell combination on the Piquette Avenue Plant's southwest side was moved slightly northwards. This enabled the Detroit Service Building to be connected to the Piquette Avenue Plant's southwest corner on the second and third floors, which created a ground-level, drive-through access point to the court between the two buildings. Also in 1926, the machinery for both of the Piquette Avenue Plant's elevators was replaced. Studebaker used the Piquette Avenue Plant for car production until 1933.

In 1936, Studebaker sold the Piquette Avenue Plant to the Minnesota Mining and Manufacturing Company (3M), a producer of rubber auto parts and non-adhesive paper tape. Around 1937, the powerhouse and several other small buildings previously built by Ford Motor Company west of the factory were demolished. The Cadillac Overall Company, a work clothes supplier, purchased the building in 1968. The Heritage Investment Company bought the building in 1989 and owned it until 2000. Since the early 1990s, a company named General Linen & Uniform Service has occupied part of the Piquette Avenue Plant's first floor. The Detroit Service Building next door was later used by Henry Ford Health System to store medical records, and in late 2024, after an eight-year vacancy period, it was converted into loft apartments. The openings that previously allowed direct access between the two buildings on the second and third floors are now sealed. The Piquette Avenue Plant still stands in spite of the decline of Detroit, which began in the mid-20th century.

== Model T Automotive Heritage Complex ==
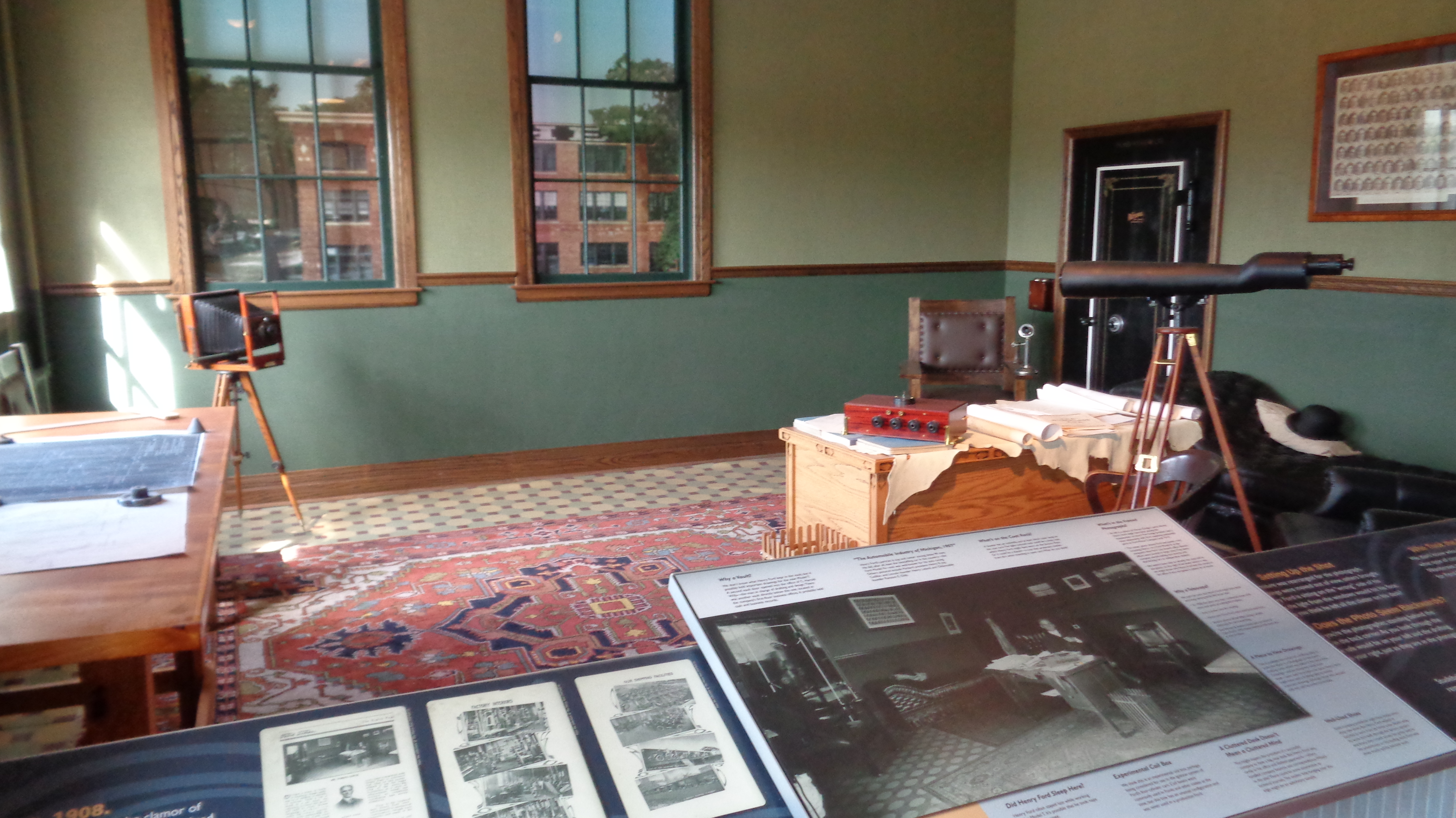
The restored office of Henry Ford in the Piquette Avenue Plant. Note the birdwatching telescope on the right.

The Ford Piquette Avenue Plant was sold to the Model T Automotive Heritage Complex in April 2000. Model T Automotive Heritage Complex is a 501(c)(3) nonprofit organization that has run the building as a museum since July 27, 2001. The Piquette Avenue Plant is the oldest purpose-built automotive factory building open to the public. The museum, located north of Midtown Detroit at 461 Piquette Avenue, attracted 31,018 visitors in 2018. It contains over 40 early automobiles built by Ford Motor Company and other Detroit-area car makers, as well as recreations of Henry Ford's office and the room where the Ford Model T was designed. One of the cars on display is Model T Serial No. 220, which was built at the factory in December 1908, and is one of the oldest surviving examples of that car model. The museum's regular operating days are Wednesdays through Sundays.

The Piquette Avenue Plant was added to the National Register of Historic Places in 2002, designated as a Michigan State Historic Site in 2003, and became a National Historic Landmark in 2006. The building has also been a contributing property for the surrounding Piquette Avenue Industrial Historic District since 2004. The factory's front façade was fully restored to its 1904 appearance and revealed to the public on September 27, 2008, the 100th anniversary of the completion of the first production Model T. On August 11, 2011, Model T Automotive Heritage Complex membership chairman Tom Genova was honored with a ROSE Award from the Detroit Metro Convention & Visitors Bureau in the Volunteers category. On May 18, 2012, the Model T Automotive Heritage Complex won a NAAMY Award from the National Association of Automobile Museums in the Films and Videos category for Division I (museums with budgets less than $300,000). On November 10, 2015, the Window Restoration Team at the Piquette Avenue Plant received a MotorCities National Heritage Area Award of Excellence in the Preservation category. Around 2016, the National Park Service considered adding the Piquette Avenue Plant to a list of places in the United States eligible for UNESCO World Heritage Site status. It was ultimately not added, because it did not have enough of its original factory equipment, and because of recommendations that its nomination be expanded to include other Detroit-area Ford Motor Company sites, such as the Highland Park Ford Plant and the Ford River Rouge Complex.

== See also ==
- Durant-Dort Carriage Company Office
- The Henry Ford
- Michigan Central Station
- List of Ford factories
- List of National Historic Landmarks in Michigan
- National Register of Historic Places listings in Detroit
