= Western Tool Works (automobile company) =

Defunct American motor vehicle manufacturer

Gale
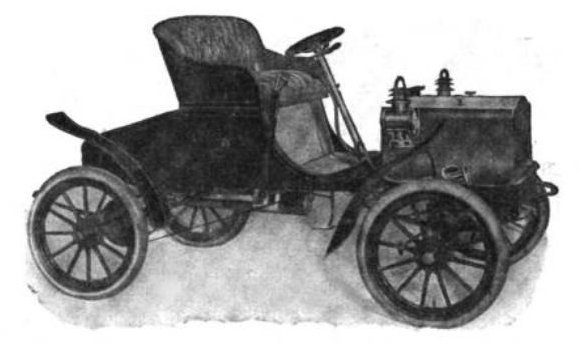
- 1906 Gale Model C

Overview
- Manufacturer: Western Tool Works
- Production: 1905–1907

Body and chassis
- Class: Entry-level car
- Body style: Roadster

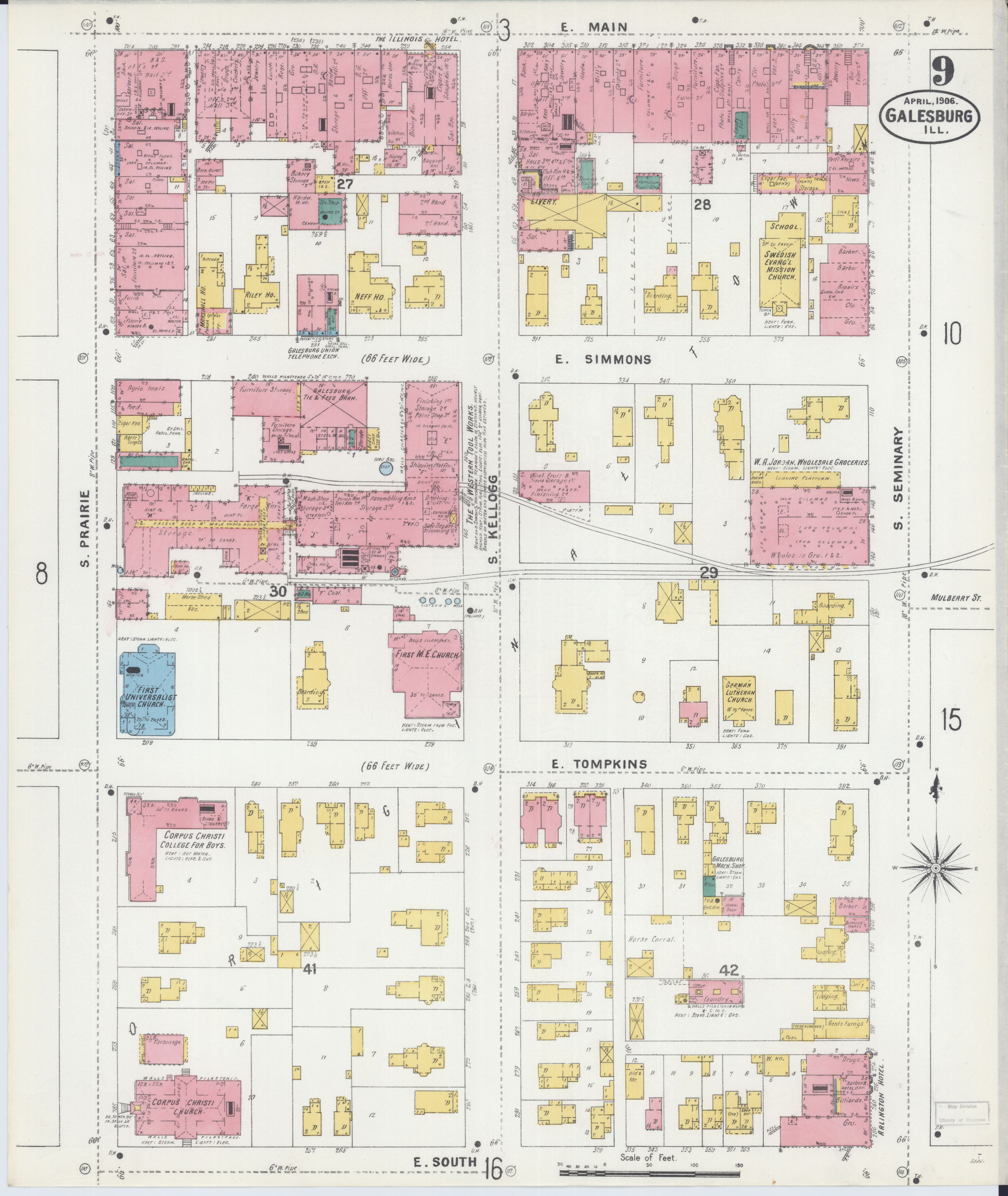
Western Tool Works Plant (1906)

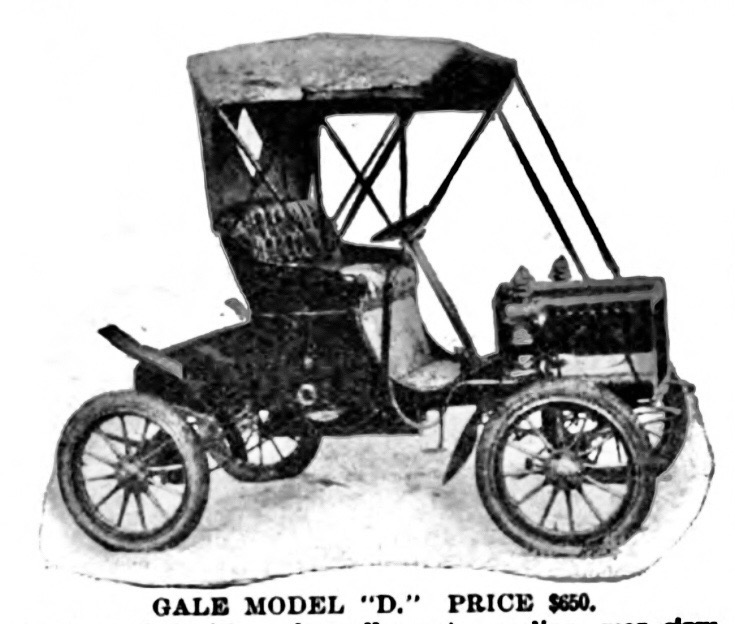
Gale Model D (1906)

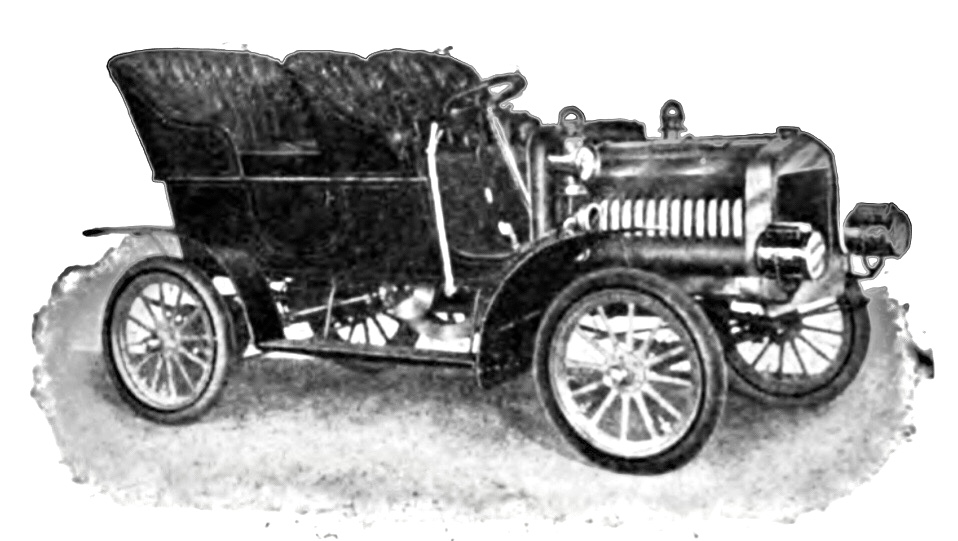
Gale Model E (1906)

Western Tool Works was an American brass era automobile manufacturer in Galesburg, Illinois. The company made Gale automobiles from 1904 to 1910. Early Gale runabouts were notable for having bodywork hinged at the rear of the car that could be lifted to ease access to the engine, essentially making the entire body the hood.

In 1905 Western produced the Gale Model A runabout for sale at US$500. This was less expensive than the high-volume Oldsmobile Runabout at $650, the 2-seat Ford Model C "Doctor's Car" at $850, or the Holsman high wheeler, but more expensive than the Black at $375, and the Success at $250.

The Model A came standard with a 5 in × 6 in (130 mm × 150 mm) water-cooled engine mounted beneath the tilting body, chain drive, 34 in (860 mm) elliptic springs, 28 in × 3 in (71.1 cm × 7.6 cm) spoke wheels with tube tires, and repair kit.

The same year, Western offered the $650 Gale Model B. Its water-cooled engine, springs, wheels, and tires had the same dimensions as those of the Model A, and it also had chain drive and a repair kit. It offered available leather buggy top, clincher tires, horn, and brass headlights.

In 1907, Western offered the 26 hp (19 kW) Gale Model K-7 phaeton at $1,250. The K-7 was a five-seat touring car with a two-cylinder 5.5 in × 5.5 in (140 mm × 140 mm) engine, a wheelbase of 95 in (2,400 mm), and 32 in × 3.5 in (81.3 cm × 8.9 cm) wheels.
