= Ford Model C =

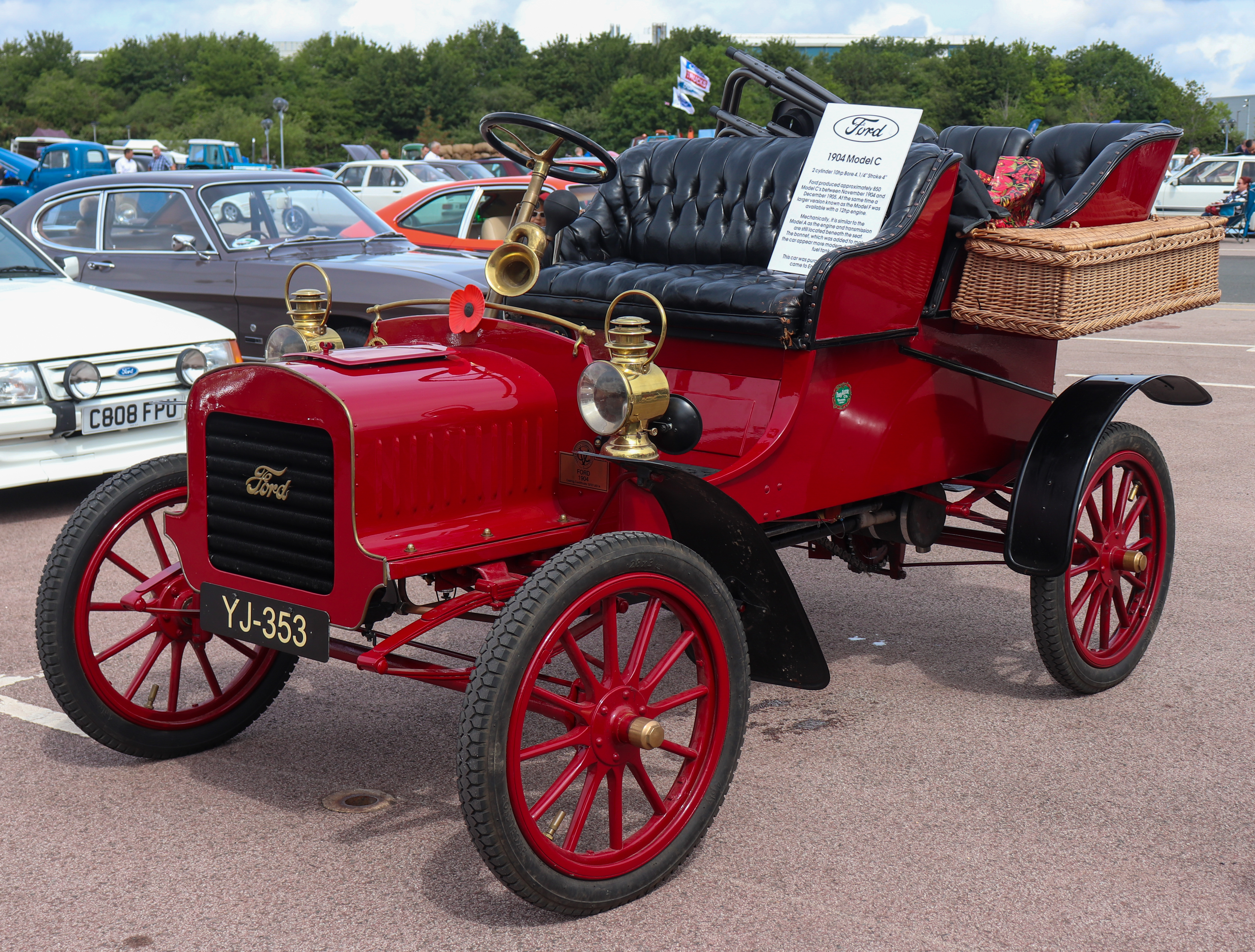

Overview
- Manufacturer: Ford
- Production: 1904–1905
- Designer: Henry Ford

Body and chassis
- Class: Entry-level
- Body style: 2-seat runabout rear-entry 4-seat tonneau

Powertrain
- Engine: Dodge 120.5 cu in (1.975 L) Flat-2
- Transmission: 2-speed planetary

Dimensions
- Wheelbase: 78 in (1,981 mm)
- Curb weight: 1,250 lb (567 kg)

Chronology
- Predecessor: Ford Model A
- Successor: Ford Model F

The Ford Model C is an automobile that was produced by Ford Motor Company. Introduced in late 1904, the Model C was Ford's lower priced 1905 model. The first sales were in October 1904, with most sold during the 1905 calendar year. Horace Dodge made major changes to the design of the engine, rear axle and other parts of the car. The Model C used the same 10 hp motor the 1904 Model A was equipped with. Model C had a longer wheelbase than the earlier Model A. Built at the Ford Piquette Avenue Plant, it was the entry-level car in the Ford model lineup, slotting below the upscale Model B. Production ended in 1905 with approximately 1,000 cars produced (Canada production included). About 160-170 Model C were assembled in Canada at Ford's new Ford Canada location in Walkerville. Due to the Dodge Brothers owning a ten percent share of the company, as well as supplying many parts and assemblies, the Model C took to the road with Dodge-built engines and other key assemblies.

The Model C engine was an opposed twin, 10 hp car, with a claimed top speed of 30 mph (48 km/h). The Model C two-seater, sometimes marketed as a "doctor's car," sold for $850 ($30,458 in 2025 dollars), compared to the high-volume Oldsmobile Runabout at US$650, Western's Gale Model A at US$500, and the Success at a low US$250. It offered a four-seater option for an additional $100. The top also cost extra: rubber $30, leather $50.

Although the Model C had a protruding front "hood," like a modern car, instead of the flat-front Model A, this was largely ornamental — the engine remained under the seat (the gas tank was under the hood).

The Model C was the first vehicle to be built at Ford Motor Company of Canada.

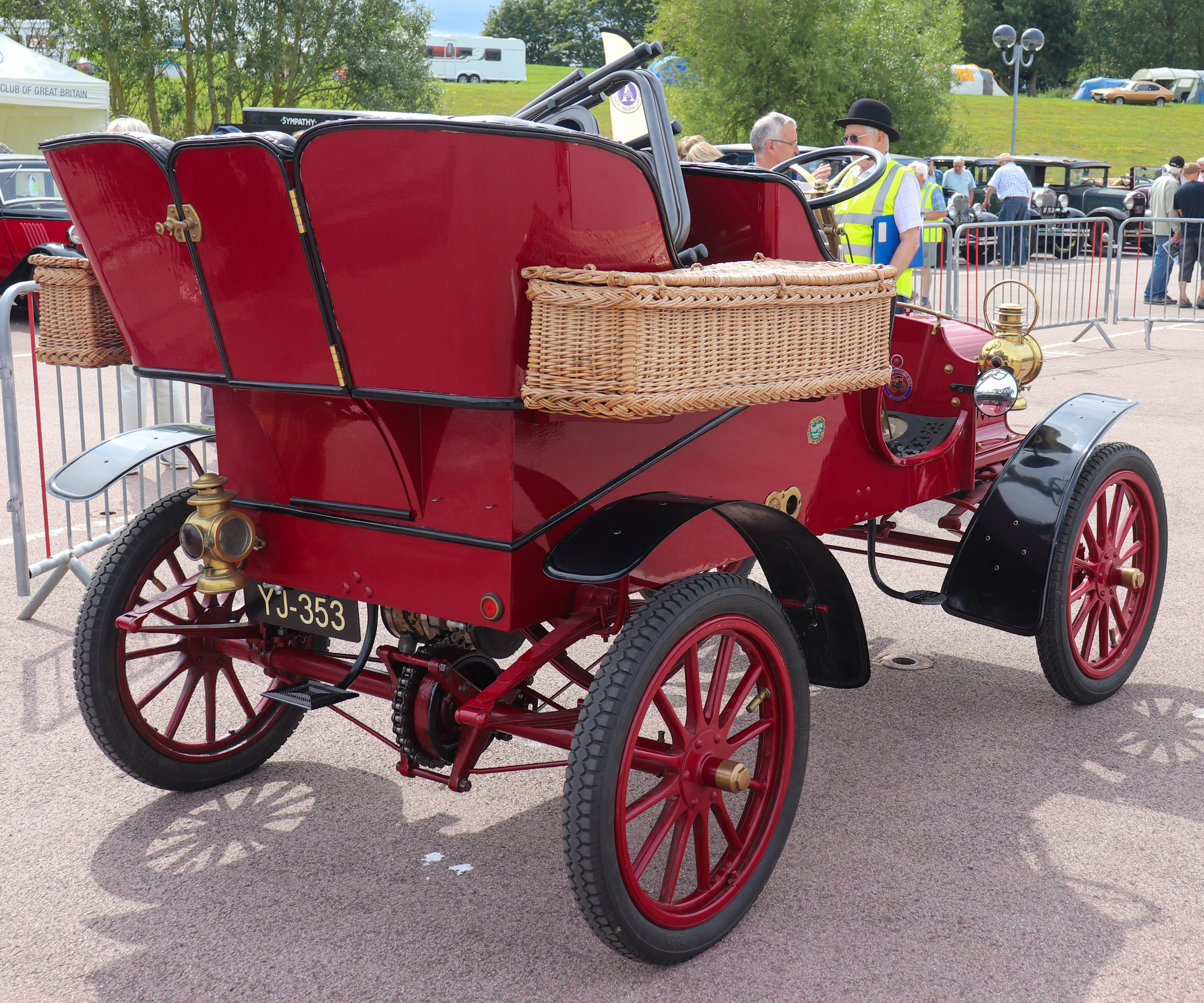
Rear

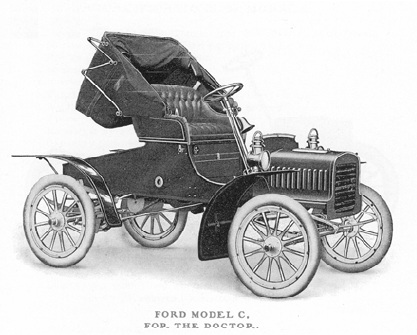
1905 Ford Model C Doctors Car

== Sources ==
- Grist, Peter (2017). Dodge Dynamite! 50 Years of Dodge Muscle Cars. Dorchester, UK: Veloce Publishing. ISBN 978-1-787110-93-9.
