= Success Automobile Manufacturing Company =

Defunct American motor vehicle manufacturer

- Company type: Private
- Industry: automobiles and commercial vehicles
- Founded: 1906
- Defunct: 1909
- Headquarters: St. Louis, Missouri, United States
- Products: highwheeler automobiles and light delivery vehicles

The Success Automobile Manufacturing Company was a brass era United States automobile manufacturer, located at 532 De Ballviere Avenue, St. Louis, Missouri, in 1906.

Business concentrated on building high wheeler automobiles, mainly buggies.

== The company ==
The Success Automobile Manufacturing Company was founded in 1906 by John C. Higdon, who had built his first car in 1896; back then for experimental purposes only. Production started with a price of US$250 which was exceedingly low, even for high wheelers. It is the lowest nominal that a new car has ever been sold for, even lower than $260 Ford T in 1925. Later models became slightly more complex, and expensive. While Success always stayed with highwheelers, they got a twin cylinder engine in 1908 (singles being dropped at the end of that year), built a commercial car in 1908 only, and offered several new models in 1909, among them their only four-cylinder car. Two- and four cylinder engines were available with water or air cooling.

While Higdon was open to let people copy his construction back in 1896, and even publicly invited to do so, he became much more aware of patents and royalties when building cars on a commercial schedule. So, he took several competitors to court on this matter; among them the Economy Motor Buggy Company (1907–1912) in Fort Wayne, Indiana, and the W. H. Kiblinger Company in Auburn, Indiana (a predecessor of the Auburn Automobile Company). Although, the Success Automobile Manufacturing Company folded before the end of this litigations.

It is estimated that Success built ca. 600 vehicles.

== Success Models A and B ==
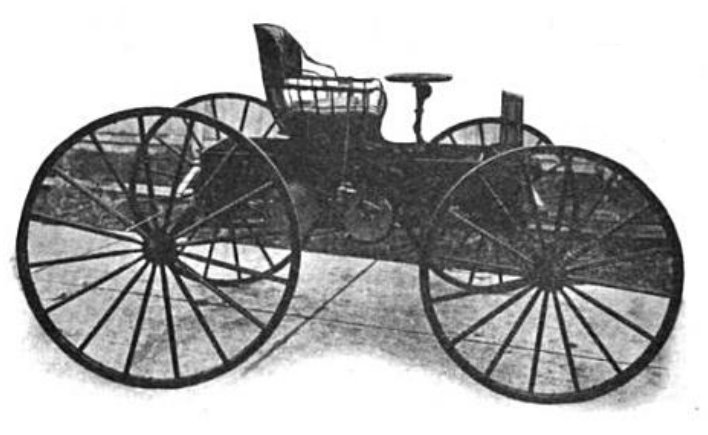
Success Model A "Auto Buggy" High Wheeler (1906)

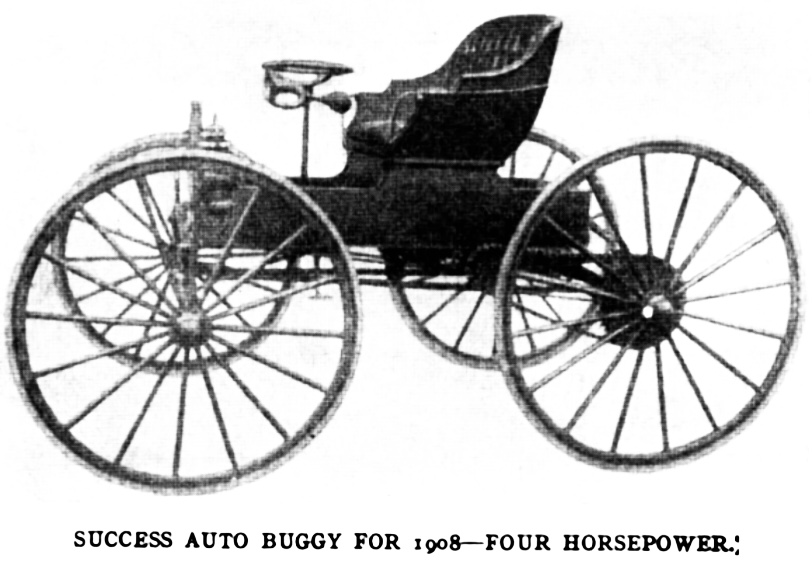
Success Model B (1907–1908)

Success only offered high-wheeler models. The initial Model A featured an air-cooled single cylinder gasoline engine of 3 in × 3 in (76 mm × 76 mm) bore and stroke, giving a capacity of 21.21 cu in (347.6 cm^{3}), and delivered 2 to 3 hp (1.5 to 2.2 kW), steel tires (rubber was available, for US$25 extra), and a 2-speed planetary transmission brought power via a single chain to a sprocket on the right rear wheel only. The engine was placed under the car, on the right side below the driver's seat. Front wheels had a diameter of 37 in (940 mm), rear wheels of 41 in (1,000 mm).

It claimed speeds of 4–18 mph (6.4–29.0 km/h) and mileage of 100 mpg_{‑US} (2.4 L/100 km).

A slightly improved Model B followed in 1907 with a 4 hp (3 kW) single cylinder engine.

== Models C, D, E, and F ==
Also in 1908, a slightly more sophisticated high wheeler came with the 2-cylinder Model C. Its engine delivered 10 HP, and the vehicle got a longer wheelbase. 1908 brought two more horsepower to the Model C, and a choice of bodywork, including the first Success commercial car. In 1909, the final year of the company's existence, the single cylinder model and the additional body styles for the Model C were dropped. Instead, new models were introduced: Model D, a Surrey that offered more power and a longer wheelbase for less money than the previous C variant, Model E, which was a more comfortable runabout than the C, offering more power and the longest wheelbase of all Success cars (96 in. / 2438 mm), and finally a different type of car, a 24 hp four-cylinder sports car.

== Success model range ==
Year	Model	Engine	Power	Wheelbase in. / mm	Bodywork	Price	Remark
1906	A	1 cyl.	2–3 HP	62 / 1575	2-pass. Runabout	$250	
1907	B	1 cyl.	4 HP	62 /	2-pass. Runabout	$275	
1907	C	2 cyl.	10 HP	72 / 1829	2-pass. Runabout	$ 400	
1907	C	2 cyl.	10 HP	72 / 1829	2-pass. Runabout	$ 400	
1908	B	1 cyl.	4 HP	62 /	2-pass. Runabout	$275	
1908	C	2 cyl.	12 HP	72 / 1829	2-pass. Runabout	$ 400	
1908	C	2 cyl.	12 HP	72 / 1829	4-pass. Surrey	$ 500	
1908	C	2 cyl.	12 HP	72 / 1829	Delivery wagon	$ 500	
1909	C	2 cyl.	12 HP	72 / 1829	2-pass. Runabout	$ 400	
1909	D	2 cyl.	18 HP	80 / 2032	4-pass. Surrey	$ 450	
1909	E	2 cyl.	16 HP	96 / 2438	Convertible Runabout	$ 425	
1909	F	4 cyl.	24 HP	84 / 2134	Convertible Runabout	$ 800	

Models A and B: air cooled; all others: choice of air or water cooling.

== Market ==
High wheelers had a unique market. They were bought mainly in the countryside where consumers were skeptical of the automobile.

So, these cars had to be simple, easy to maintain and repair, and inexpensive. Sophistication was no criterion. Normally, they were offered for $350–450, like the $375 Black. With a price tag of $250, the Success Model A was one of the cheapest and simplest automobiles available in the U.S.

Later Success vehicles competed with slightly more sophisticated high wheelers, as offered by the Auto-Bug Company ($850), or the George White Buggy.

Few automobile manufacturers yet had a nationwide representative network, or even sold their products in the whole country. Car-building was often a local business, making comparisons difficult. Comparing them with "real" or conventional automobiles is still another challenge, as their building methods, and their construction differed because of their different tasks.

The best-selling American car of the early 1900s was the Oldsmobile Curved Dash that cost $650 through its whole production run, but was nearly as outdated in 1906 as the Success was when introduced: neither had a front-mounted engine or shaft drive, the latter becoming standard at least for smaller cars very soon, and both had single-cylinder engines while even most high-wheelers used twin, and Ford introduced its Model N, a four-cylinder, for only $500 in 1907.

== See also ==
- List of defunct United States automobile manufacturers
