= Tonneau =

Open automotive bed

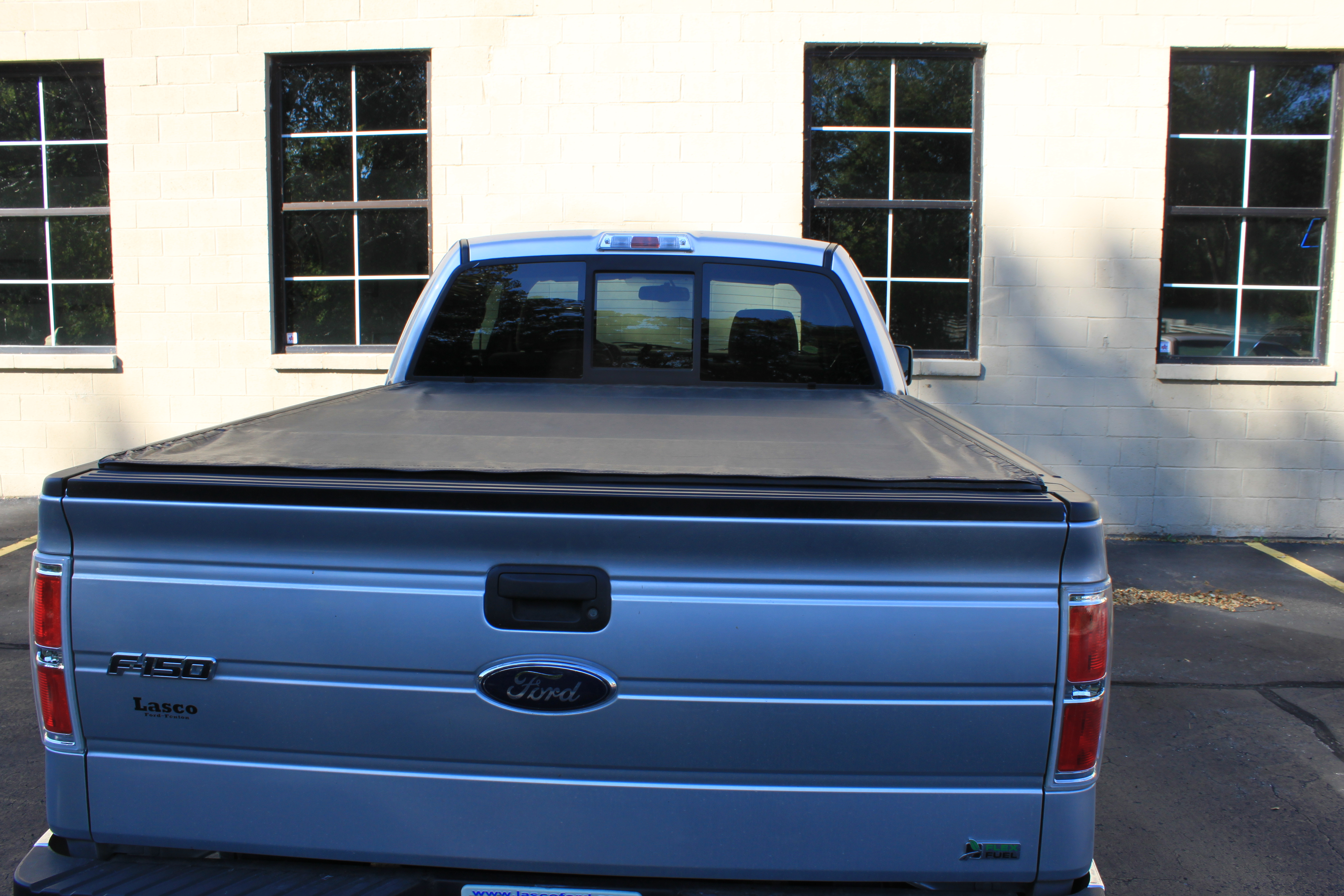
Tonneau cover on a Ford F-150

A tonneau (US: /təˈnoʊ/ or UK: /ˈtɒnoʊ/) is the open-top area of a car or pickup truck, used for passengers or cargo. In trucks, it refers to the bed (American English) or tray (British English).

== Origin of term ==
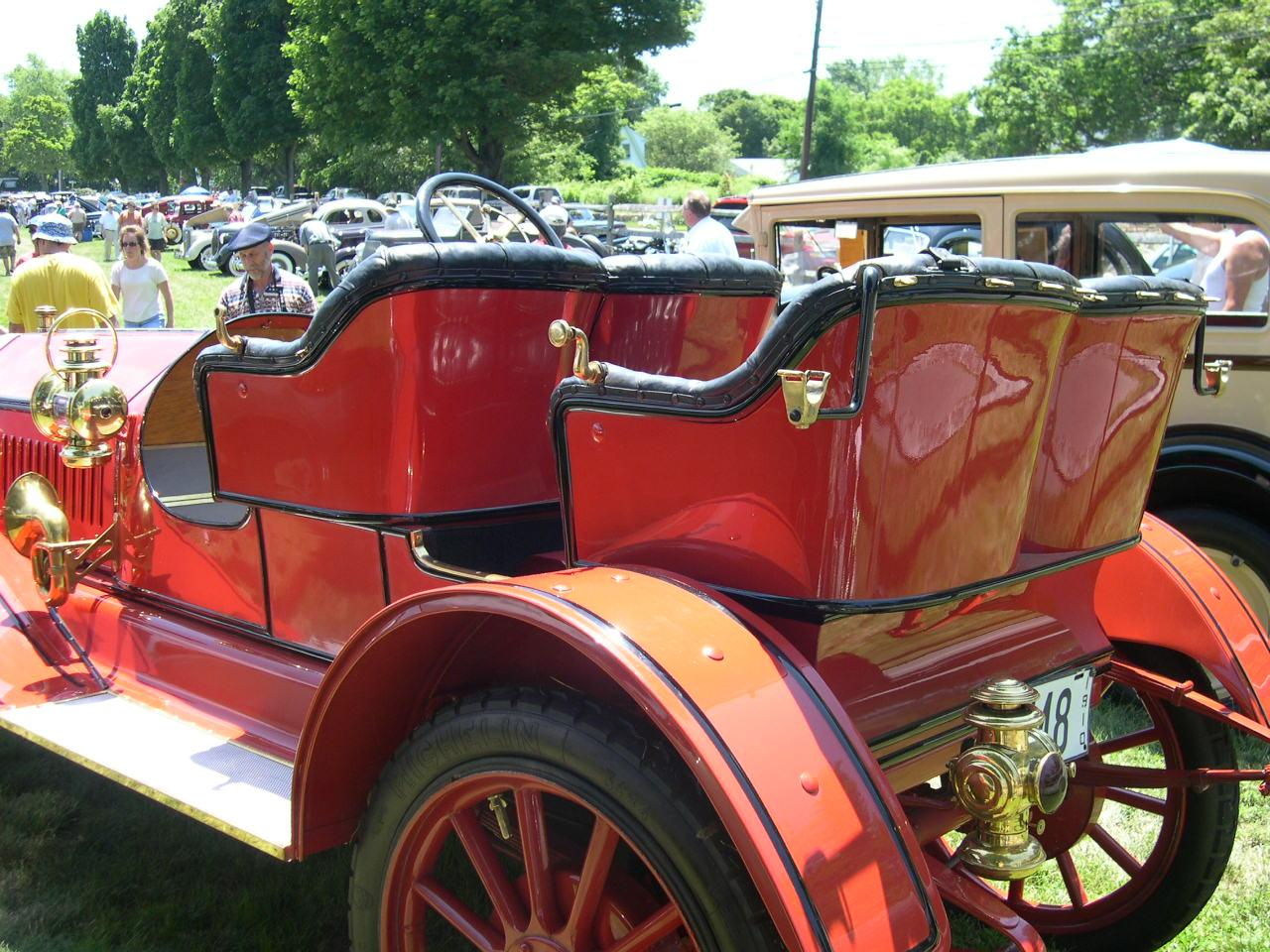
1910 Buick side-entrance tonneau without tonneau cover

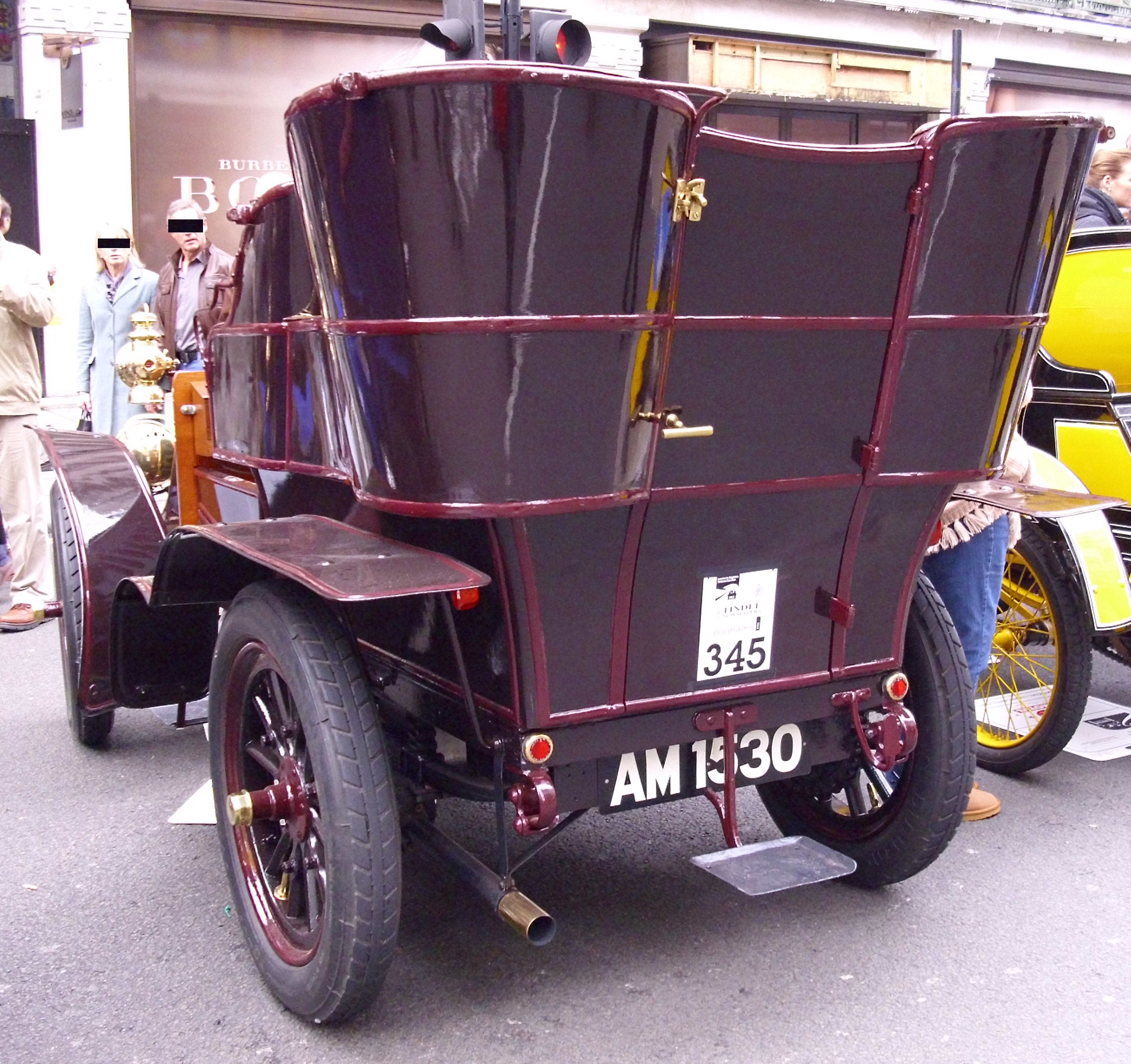
1903 Sunbeam rear-entrance tonneau

A tonneau was originally an open rear passenger compartment, rounded like a barrel, on an automobile and, by extension, a body style incorporating such a compartment. The word is French, meaning 'cask' or barrel, cf. “tun”.

=== Rear entrance tonneau ===
Early tonneaus normally had a rear-facing hinged door, but single and dual side doors were soon introduced.

When the street was muddy or dirty, the car could be backed up to the curb so tonneau passengers could exit directly onto the sidewalk.

== Tonneau cover ==
Historically, tonneau cover referred to a flexible temporary cover (typically made out of leather or canvas) for an open area of a vehicle.

In current automotive terminology it typically refers to a hard or soft cover that spans the back of a pickup truck to protect the load from weather elements or thieves, or to improve aerodynamics. Tonneau covers come in many styles that fold, retract, or tilt open, and can be locked shut. Common materials used include steel, aluminium, canvas, PVC, fibreglass, and carbon fibre.

Tonneau covers are also used to cover and protect open areas of boats. Many of these covers are made of waterproofed canvas and are held in place by snaps.

The older, original tonneau covers were used to protect unoccupied passenger seats in convertibles and roadsters, and the cargo bed of a pickup truck or coupé utility.

Modern hard tonneau covers open by a hinging or folding mechanism, while segmented or soft covers open by rolling up or folding.

Truck and car tonneau covers keep items out of the weather and out of sight of potential thieves.

The year and model of a truck determine the size of its tonneau. Many dealers will recommend using a tape measure to measure the truck bed.

=== Touring cars ===
Early open-bodied touring-type automobiles used tonneau covers to protect unoccupied rear seats. As early as the 1930s, lakes racers, searching for an extra competitive edge, imitated early automobile construction and skinned the cockpits of their roadsters and streamliners with removable canvas. The skins covered gaping cockpits that would otherwise disturb airflow and create undue drag; as a result, tonneau-equipped cars ultimately went faster with a given amount of power.

=== Sports cars ===
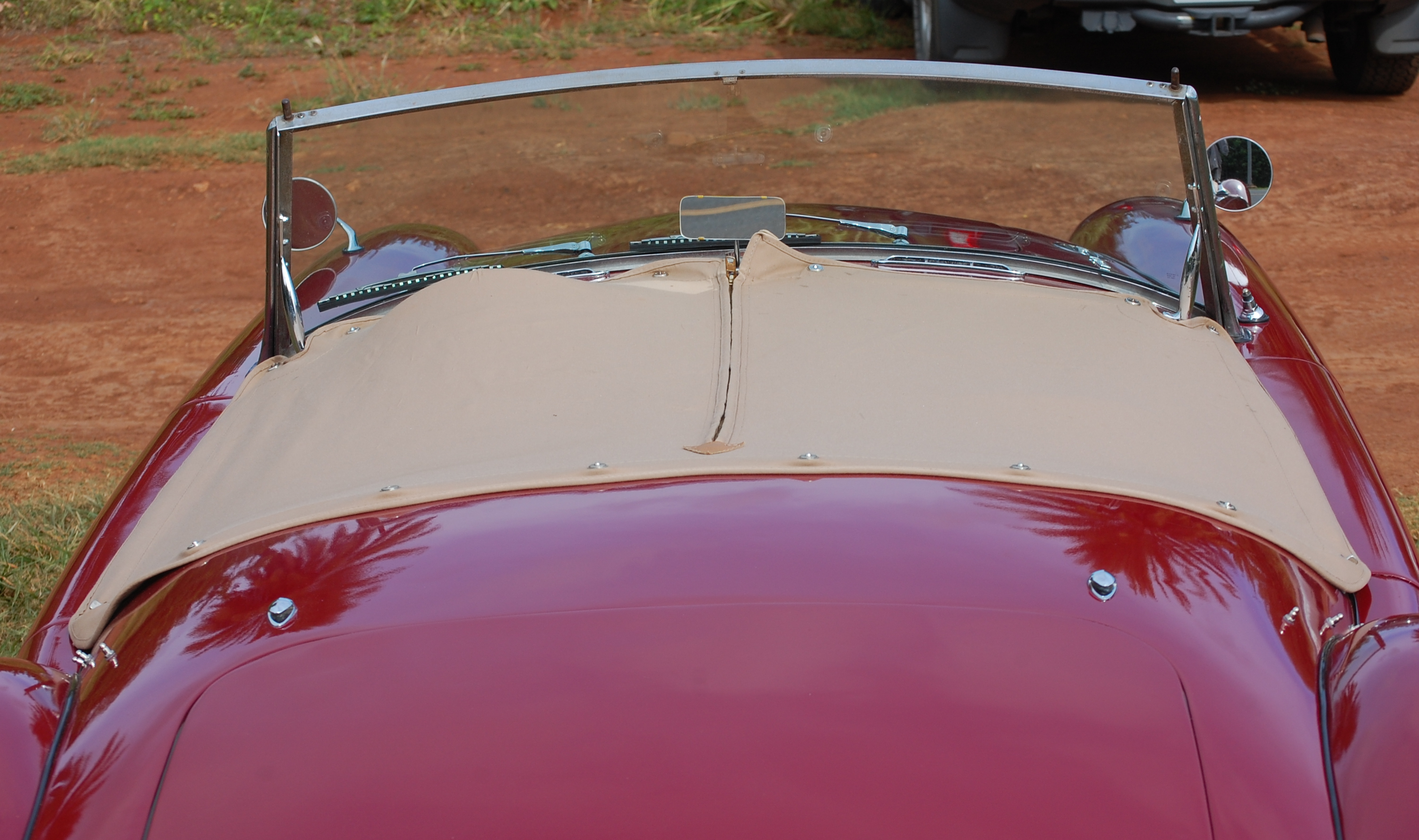
Tonneau cover on an MGA

Tonneau covers are used in lieu of hard or soft convertible tops on open sports cars such as the MG, Triumph, Austin-Healey, and Porsche Boxster. These covers, often made of natural or artificial leather, cover the entire passenger compartment, and are zippered so the driver's seat can be uncovered while the rest of the interior remains covered.

=== Pickup trucks ===
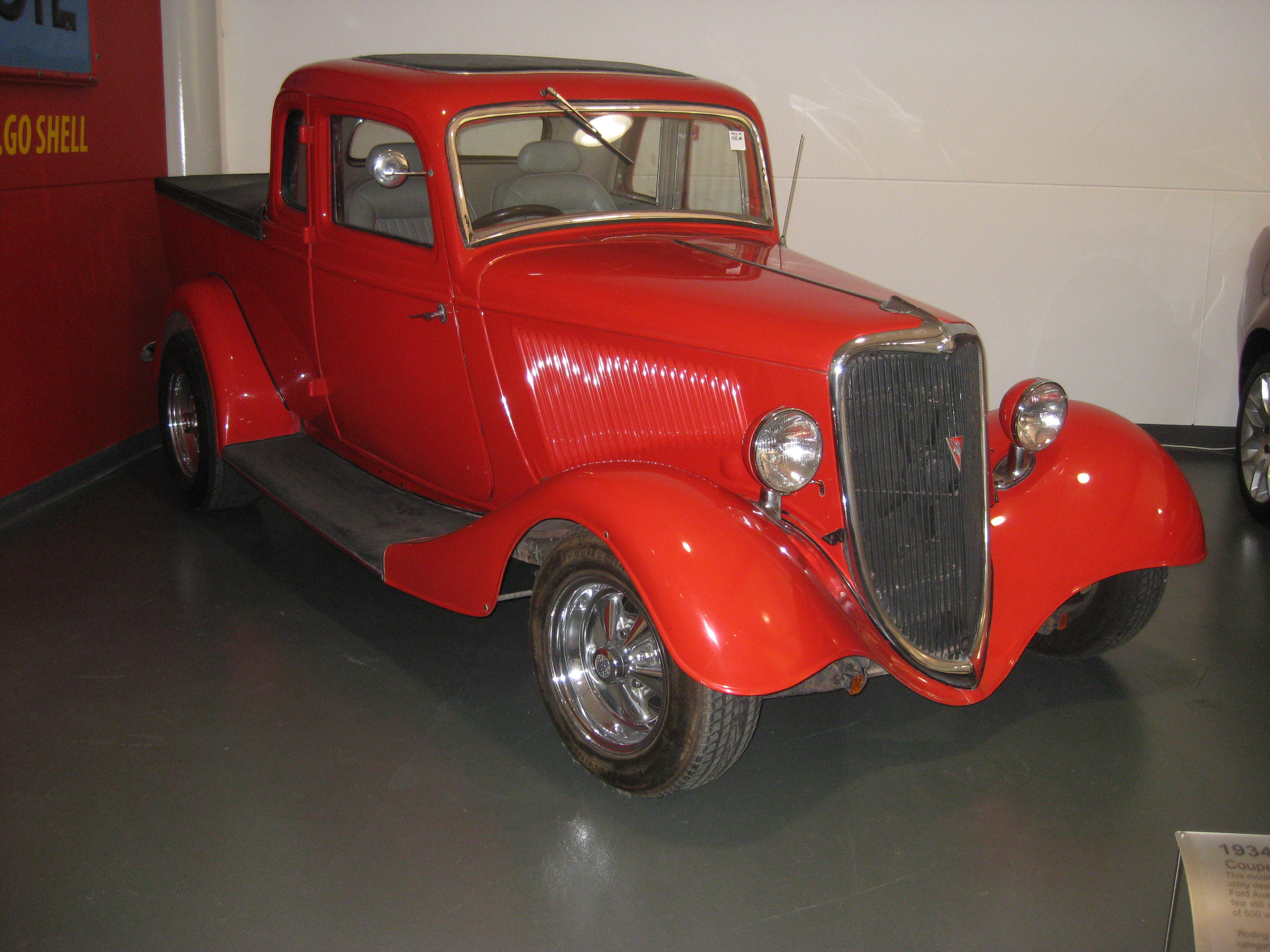
The first Australian ute (vehicle) was a 1934 Ford Coupe Utility. It included a tonneau.

Tonneau covers are used in coupé utility cars and pickup trucks to cover and secure the cargo bed and come in a variety of styles. Mainly they are categorized by material Soft or Hard covers. Soft covers can be rollup or folding and Hard covers are rollup, folding or one piece.

The most common style is the roll-up tonneau made from cloth or vinyl, which uses a rib-like structure to support the fabric and keep it taut and roll up toward the cab of the truck. A snap-based system is also used, but has become less common due to truck owners not wanting to install the snaps on their vehicle as they typically require drilling or permanent adhesive. Hard roll-up tonneau covers are more firm than regular roll-up tonneau covers. They are made of a wall of individual aluminum slats, covered with soft vinyl. In the unrolled position, these aluminium slats form a hard aluminium shell, which not only covers the cargo inside the bed, but also may support loads up 400 pounds on top of it.

Another style of truck bed tonneau cover is a retractable unit, which is mounted at the front and sides of the bed and rolls up or retracts from the tailgate towards the cab. The retractable tonneau is typically made of vinyl, plastic or aluminium. Retractable tonneaus are more secure than soft tonneau covers, since they usually lock and are made from a harder composition, but they take more time to install and are designed for semi-permanent installation. Fiberglass, hard plastic, or aluminium tonneau covers are also common. Some may be painted to match the truck, are solid in construction, and can be locked. These covers are usually heavy and require gas struts to assist in opening and closing. They operate much like a vehicle's hood, typically opening from the tailgate end of the bed (back to front). Some have multiple compartments that open front to back, back to front, side to side, or even rise vertically. Fiberglass, hard plastic, or aluminium tonneau covers are sometimes installed as a factory option on new vehicles. More than 700kg of cargo can be carried on top of metal tonneau covers.

Many sellers claim that tonneau covers improve gas mileage because they make the truck more streamlined. However, air currents create a wake inside the pickup bed, which helps the aerodynamics. A tonneau cover interferes with this wake, and scientific tests have shown little to no improvement in mileage by using a tonneau cover traveling at less than 70 mph (110 km/h). A similar effect is seen when the tailgate is down and the mileage goes down.
