= Ford Model A (1903–04) =

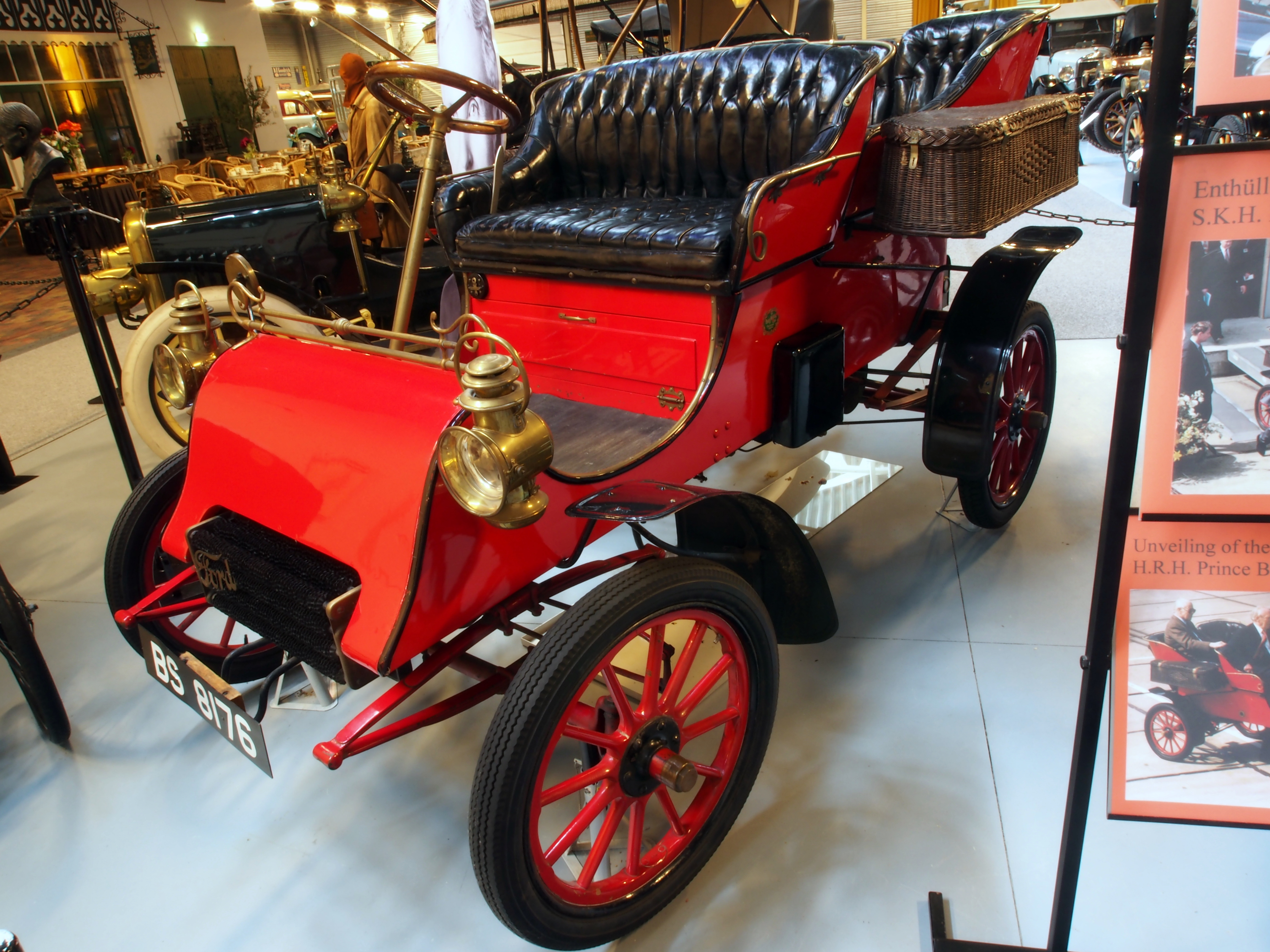

Overview
- Manufacturer: Ford
- Also called: Fordmobile; Ford Model AC
- Production: 1903–1904
- Designer: Henry Ford

Body and chassis
- Body style: 2-seat runabout rear-entry 4-seat tonneau

Powertrain
- Engine: Flat-2 1,668 cc (101.8 cu in) 8 hp (6 kW)
- Transmission: 2-speed planetary

Dimensions
- Wheelbase: 72 in (1.8 m)
- Curb weight: 1,240 lb (560 kg)

Chronology
- Predecessor: Ford Quadricycle
- Successor: Ford Model B; Ford Model C

The original Ford Model A is the first car produced by the Ford Motor Company, beginning production in 1903. Ernest Pfennig, a Chicago dentist, became the first owner of a Model A on July 23, 1903; 1,750 cars were made in 1903 and 1904 at the Ford Mack Avenue Plant, a modest rented wood-frame building on Detroit's East Side, and Ford's first facility. The Model A was replaced by the Ford Model C during 1904 with some sales overlap.

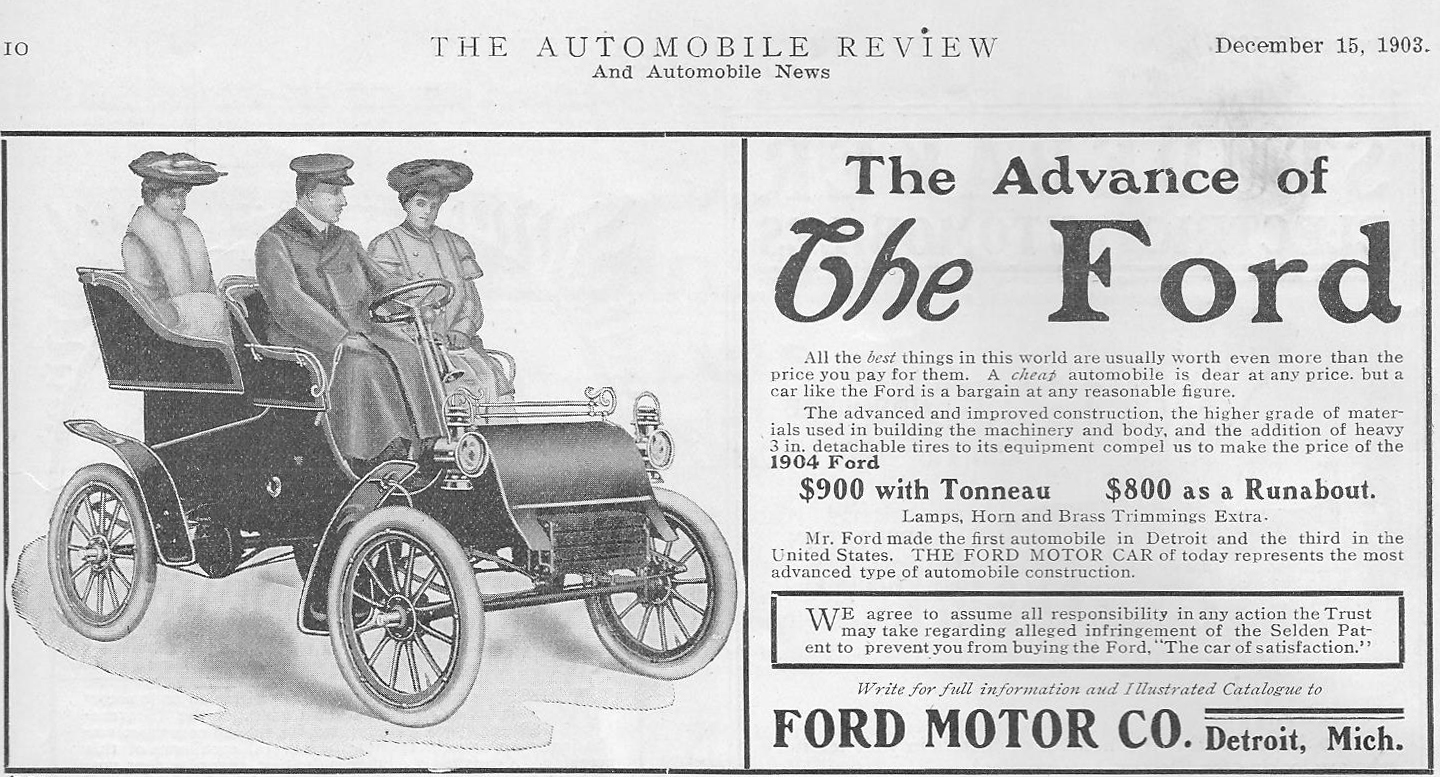
Ad for the 1904 Model A from the December 15, 1903 issue of Automobile Review magazine

The horizontal-mounted flat-2, situated amidships of the car, produced 8 horsepower (6 kilowatts). A planetary transmission was fitted with two forward speeds and reverse, a Ford signature later seen on the Ford Model T. The car weighed 1,240 pounds (562 kg) and could reach a top speed of 28 mph (45 km/h). It had a 72-inch (183 cm) wheelbase and sold for a base price of $750. Options included a rear tonneau with two seats and a rear door for $100, a rubber roof for $30 or a leather roof for $50. Band brakes were used on the rear wheels. However, it was $150 more than its most direct competitor, the Oldsmobile Curved Dash, so did not sell as well. The 1904 model came as a two-seater runabout for $800 (Note: equivalent to $29,000 in 2025 (CPI deflator).) or the $900 four-seater tonneau model with an option to add a top.

The company had spent almost its entire $28,000 initial investment funds (Note: equivalent to $783,000 in 2025 (GDP deflator).) with only $223.65 left in its bank account when the first Model A was sold. The success of this car model generated a profit for the Ford Motor Company, Henry Ford's first successful business.

Although Ford advertised the Model A as the "most reliable machine in the world", it suffered from many problems common to vehicles of the era, including overheating and slipping transmission bands. The Model A was sold only in red by the factory, though some were later repainted in other colors.

== Ford Model AC ==
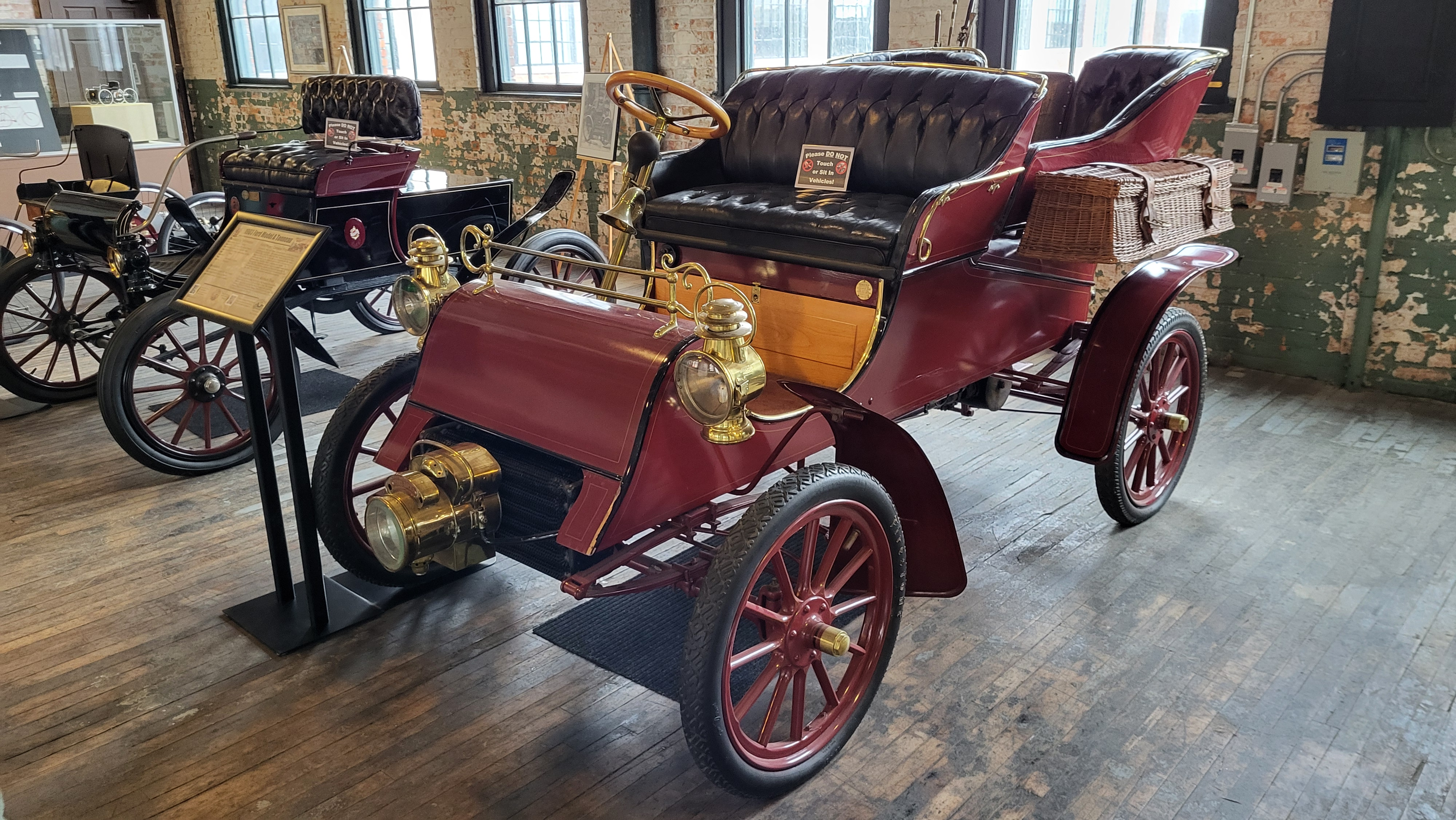
Ford Model AC in the Ford Piquette Avenue Plant in Detroit, Michigan. Note the larger radiator.

1904 Model A cars were equipped with the larger, 10 horsepower (7.5 kW) engine of the Model C and were sold as the Model AC. The Model AC can be visually distinguished from the Model A by its larger six-by-three-bar radiator, as well as its open rear axle chain drive.

== Bibliography ==
- Kimes, Beverly Rae; Clark, Henry Austin Jr. (1989). "Ford – Model A – Two". Standard Catalog of America Cars: 1805–1942 (2nd ed.). Krause Publications. pp. 547–548. ISBN 0-87341-111-0.
- Lacey, Robert (1986). Ford: The Men and the Machine. Little, Brown and Company. ISBN 0-316-51166-8.
