= Automotive industry in Flint, Michigan =

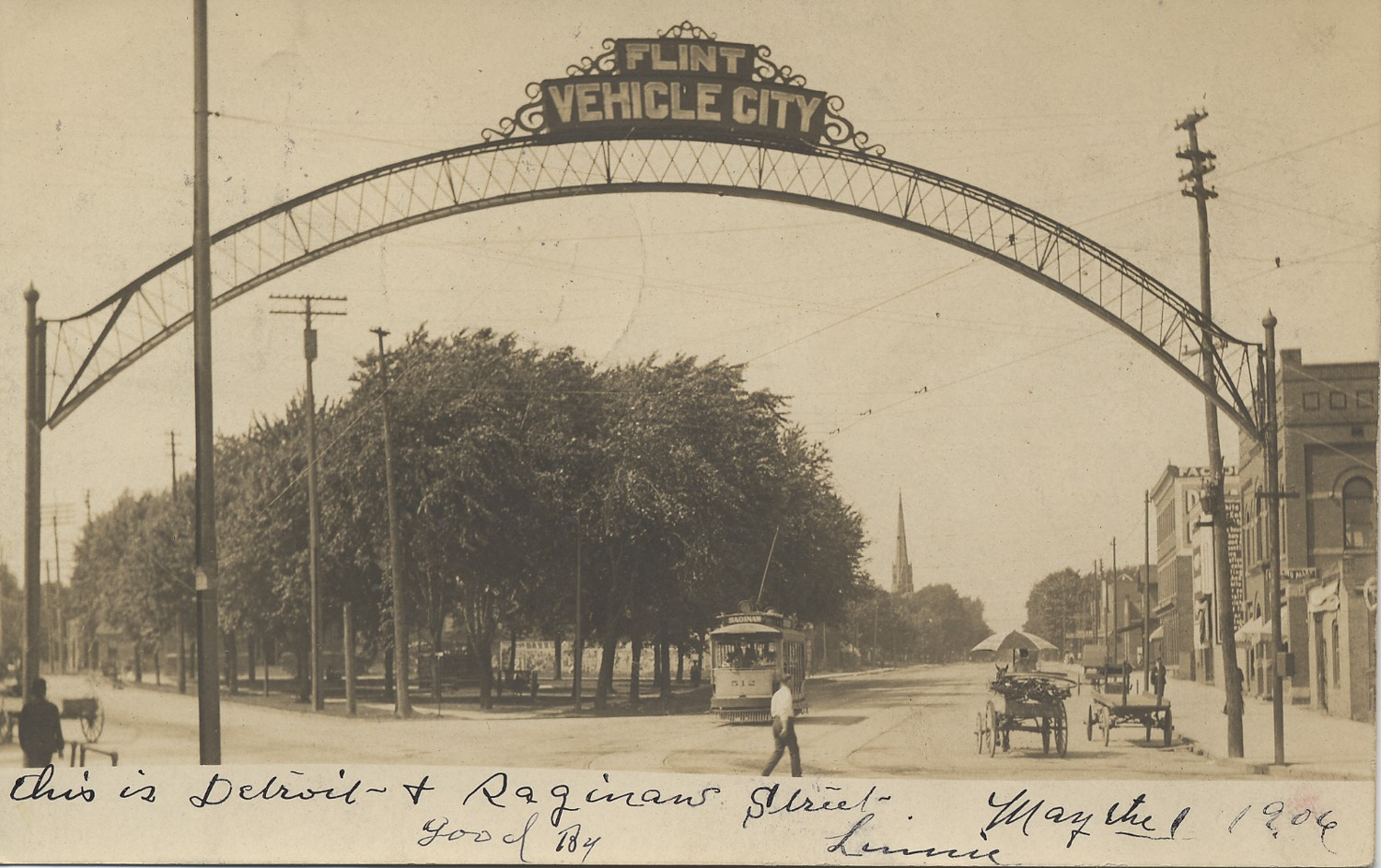
A postcard showing the corner of Detroit and Saginaw streets in Flint, seen through wrought iron arch with sign "Flint Vehicle City". The signs were actually erected in the late 1800s because Flint was the leading center of carriage production (also called "vehicles") in the country.

Flint, Michigan is a city which previously relied on its automotive industry, and still does to an extent. Over the past several decades, General Motors plants in Genesee County have experienced re-namings, management shifts, openings, closures, reopenings, and spinoffs.

== Plant history ==
=== Durant-Dort Factory One ===
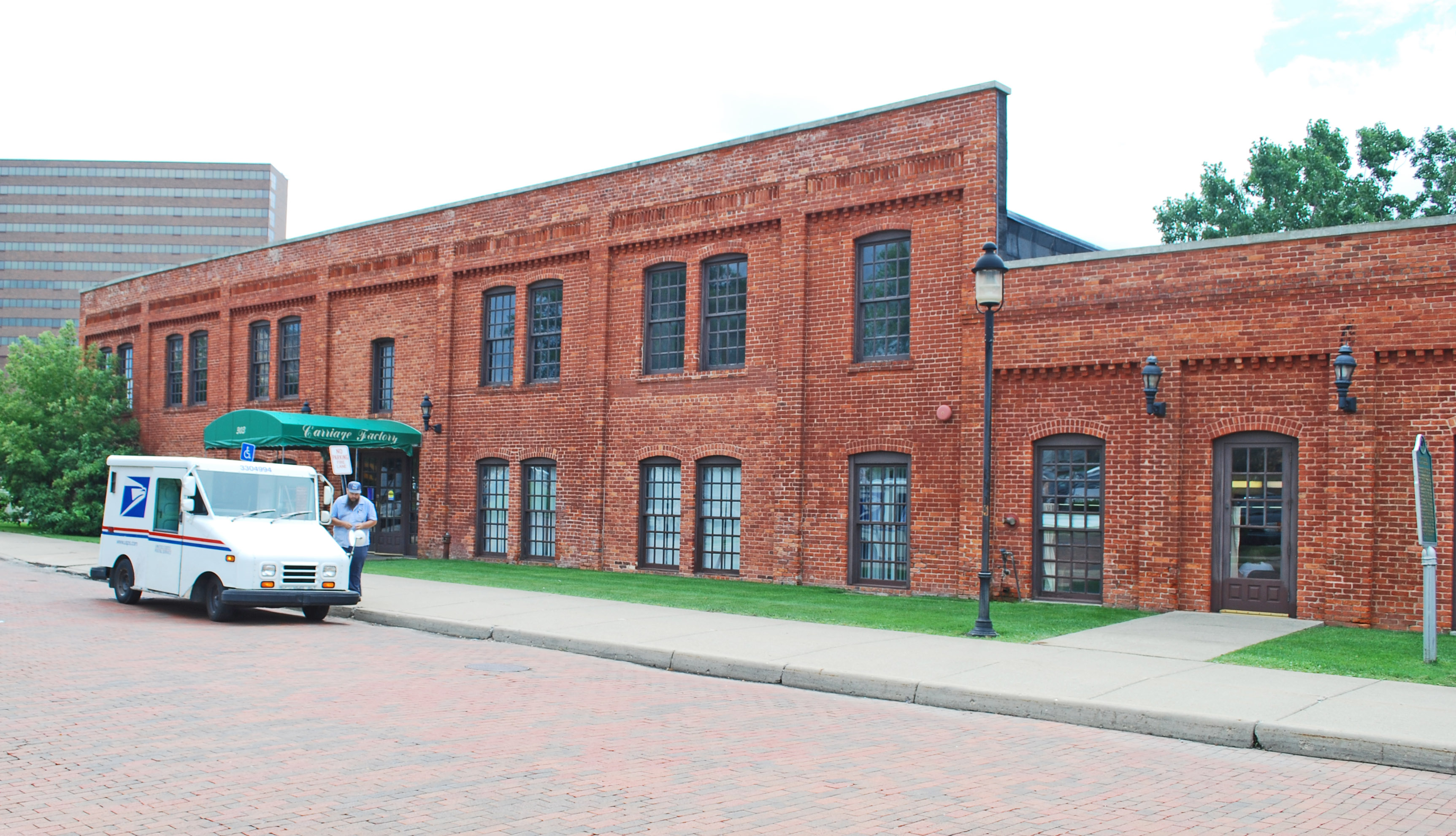
Durant-Dort Factory One

General Motors traces its roots to the Durant-Dort Carriage Company of Flint named after William C. Durant and Josiah Dallas Dort. GM purchased the original Durant-Dort factory building and the Durant-Dort office building on Water Street in May 2013. The company will take over responsibility for maintenance from the Flint Historical Foundation.

=== Buick Motor Division ===
==== Division HQ and Assembly, Engine, Parts Plants/Buick City/Powertrain Flint North ====
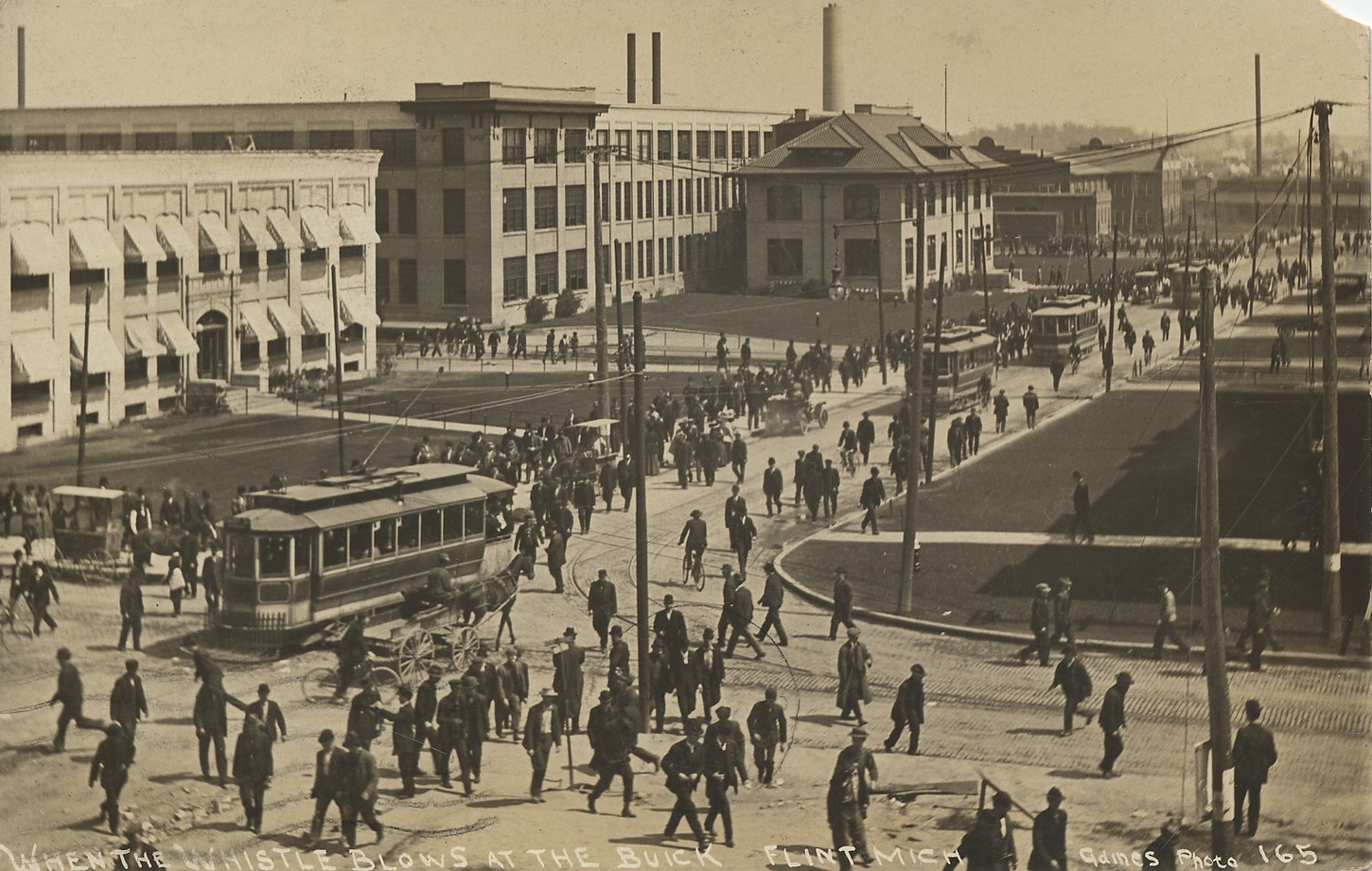
3.5x5.5 black and white, sepia-toned postcard showing workers outside the Buick factory complex in Flint, with message on back from worker

On Hamilton Avenue, the oldest buildings opened in 1908. This was the largest GM complex in the world. Buick originally opened in Flint on West Kearsley Street; this plant was repurposed as the first Chevrolet factory after the Hamilton Avenue site opened.

In 1983 Buick announced plans for Buick City (inspired by Toyota's "Toyota City" plant), which would combine Buick's assembly and Fisher #1's bodybuilding operations. The production of rear-wheel drive cars at Buick's Hamilton Avenue plant ended. After gutting the interior, installing robots (and other retooling), and the construction of a new body shop and just-in-time delivery docks, Buick City began building front-wheel drive vehicles in 1985.

Buick Motor Division became a marketing and public-relations entity in 1984, when the Buick-Oldsmobile-Cadillac Group (BOC) was created and took over engineering and assembly control from Buick, Oldsmobile, Cadillac and the GM Assembly Division. GM created the Flint Automotive Division to manage BOC's activities in Genesee County, which included the former Buick factories and engineering. BOC dissolved in 1992, and eventually its functions were transferred to the Cadillac/Luxury Car Division (not to be confused with the Cadillac Motor Car Division, the traditional Cadillac operation).

Buick City closed in June 1999. It (and other former Buick buildings not technically part of Buick City) was demolished from 2001 to 2003. The Buick Motor Division administration moved to Detroit in 1998. The 1960s-era former Buick world headquarters, after briefly housing EDS workers until 2003, was demolished in 2006. The adjacent former Buick transmission, transmission-parts, engine-assembly and engine-parts plants (GM Powertrain and Flint North) closed by December 2010.

=== AC Spark Plug Division/Delphi Corporation ===
==== Industrial Avenue plant ====
Built before 1912, it replaced the original 1908 operation inside a Buick building. It closed about 1976, and was demolished shortly thereafter.

==== Dort Highway plant and division HQ/Delphi Flint East ====
This plant manufactured spark plugs, air, oil and fuel filters, instrument clusters and other parts. It opened around the mid-1920s in the former Dort (automobile) plant. The Dort Highway plant became known as Flint East when AC took over the old Chevrolet manufacturing operations on Chevrolet Avenue in 1987. In 1988 AC Spark Plug merged with GM's Rochester Products Division, and was renamed AC Rochester. World headquarters remained in Flint, soon moving to the Great Lakes Technology Center. In the late 1980s, parts of Flint East were turned over to GM's Delco Electronics. In 1994, AC Rochester merged with Delco Remy and became the short-lived AC Delco Systems.

1995 saw the creation of Delphi Automotive Systems (which took over Flint East), and in 1999 GM spun off Delphi. Spark-plug production ended at Flint East in early 2006. Under an agreement reached by Delphi, General Motors, and the United Auto Workers in June 2007 Flint East and two other plants would remain open, operated by GM or a third party designated by GM. Hourly employment at the plant at that time had diminished to approximately 1,100 people. A GM Service Parts Operations packaging and processing center has opened in the easternmost plant in the complex, on Davison Road in Burton.

A spokesman for GM confirmed in February 2013 that Delphi Flint East will close in November 2013; the factory building is owned by DPH Holdings, while the equipment is owned by Delphi.

=== Chevrolet Motor Division ===
==== Flint Manufacturing Div./Delphi Flint West/Flint Tool and Die ====
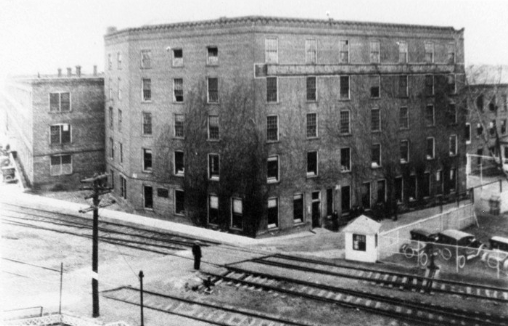
The Flint Wagon Works, which became a Chevrolet factory

The plant opened on Wilcox Street, later renamed Chevrolet Avenue, about 1913, comprising the Motor Division (engine-assembly and engine-parts plants) and the Pressed Metal Division (parts plants) and the pre-World War II Chevrolet Assembly (Plant Two) and Fisher Body #2 plants (later Chevrolet Plant 2A). It was located at the corner of Kearsley Street and Wilcox Street. This was also originally known as the Flint Wagon Works before it was relocated to its current location, known as Buick City.

In 1984, due to smaller sales of four-cylinder engines, the Chevrolet Flint Motor Plant (Plant Four) closed after millions of dollars in improvements several years earlier. The same year, the newly created Chevrolet-Pontiac-Canada Group briefly took over Chevrolet Manufacturing from Chevrolet Motor Division; soon, the newly formed Fisher Guide Division acquired the complex. Around 1987, the Chevrolet plant was taken over by AC Spark Plug and became AC Spark Plug Flint West. In 1988 it became AC Rochester Flint West, and in 1994 AC Delco Systems Flint West. In early 1995, it was renamed Delphi Flint West.

Around this time, the plant complex (known as "Chevy in the Hole") began to disappear. Among the first plants to go were the truck garage, Plant 5 (formerly Engine Parts) and the administration building. This continued until 2004, when Plant Four (which had reopened some years after it initially closed in 1984) shut down and was demolished. Plant Four's last products were generators and fuel filters.

The only remaining buildings are Building 35 and Plant 38. Building 35 (originally housing new-car delivery and, later, heat treatment) was donated to Kettering University (originally General Motors Institute) in 1996. After the addition of another floor and a new facade, it houses the university's Mechanical Engineering and Chemistry Center. Workers in Building 35 built the first Corvette prototype, around 1953. Plant 38 (the Die and Engineering Center) opened in 1967, is still operated by GM and is known as Flint Tool and Die. According to GM's website, at Flint Tool and Die there are 228 hourly and 25 salaried workers. The rest of the land is being redeveloped to be turned into a public park for the City of Flint. The park will be called "Chevy Commons".

==== Flint Assembly Division/Flint Truck Assembly ====
Opened on Van Slyke Road in 1947 for car and truck assembly, in 1970 Chevrolet Assembly converted to truck-only production and GM created the Truck and Bus Group in 1981. The GM Assembly Division then transferred the Chevrolet Flint Assembly plant to Truck and Bus, which was later renamed North American Truck Platforms and then the GM Truck Group.

Now known as Flint Assembly, it remains an important operation for GM; it builds Chevrolet Kodiak and GMC TopKick commercial trucks, and Chevrolet Silverado and GMC Sierra full-size pickup trucks. In December 2004, GM announced it would invest $150 million into retooling at this plant. After a maximum of at least 8,000 workers at Fisher 2 and Chevrolet Assembly, 1,862 hourly and 185 salaried employees work there. Events at this plant during the late 1970s are chronicled in Ben Hamper's 1991 book Rivethead: Tales from the Assembly Line.

==== Flint Frame and Stamping Plant/Flint Metal Center/Flint Metal Fabrication Div. ====
On Bristol Road, it opened in 1954. Operated by the Chevrolet-Pontiac-Canada Group from 1984 to 1992 and eventually by the Metal Fabricating Division, the plant is now known as the GM Flint Metal Center. GM has spent over $60 million upgrading the plant in recent years. 2,000 hourly and 180 salaried workers are there today. The plant population has shrunk to under 400 hourly workers.

==== Flint V8 Engine Plant/Flint Engine South ====
On Van Slyke Road, it opened around 1953, closed around 1999 and was soon demolished. Immediately south of it, GM built the $500 million Flint Engine South (now known as Flint Engine Operations) to build the Atlas L6 Engine plant which opened in 2000. A $300 million addition, recently opened, builds the High Feature V6 engine engines. The land where the V8 Plant once stood is now home to the GM Paint plant section of Flint Assembly.

==== National Parts Distribution/Service Parts Operations ====
On Bristol Road in Swartz Creek, it opened in 1957. It merged with other car divisions' parts operations in 1969 and was renamed the GM Parts Division (later Warehousing and Distribution). General Motors Parts Division, as it was known in the 1970s and 1980s, had operations both at its headquarters in Swartz Creek and its engineering and technical cataloging operation in downtown Flint, housed in the Genessee Bank Building on Saginaw Street. Susbsequently, in the late 1980s, the downtown operation was folded into the new GMPD building in Swartz Creek. During the late 1990s, GM's worldwide parts purchasing and distribution office headquarters moved from here to a new building in Grand Blanc Township. Known as Service Parts Operations-Flint, the Swartz Creek facility remains open with a large amount of vacant office space. Currently, 595 hourly and 70 salaried workers are employed at SPO Flint. In May 2014, GM invested $10 million in upgrading the appearance and quality of the plant.

Recently, a new processing/packaging center has opened on Davison Road in Burton, in a former AC Spark Plug (later Delphi) plant.

=== Fisher Body Division ===
==== Flint Plant #1 ====
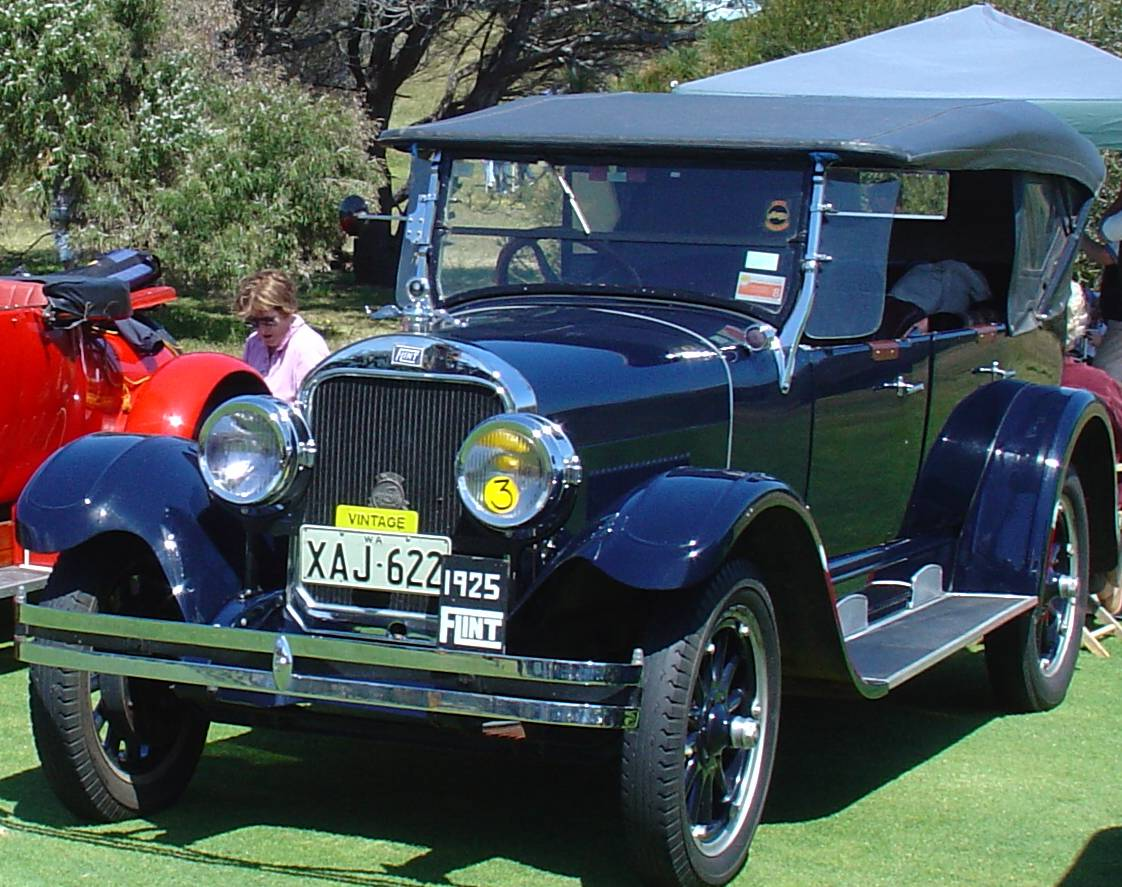
A 1925 Flint car at a 2008 rally in Perth, Western Australia

This plant was located on South Saginaw Street, and manufactured Buick bodies and pressed-metal parts. GM bought the plant from Durant Motors before 1935; it had opened in the early 1920s as Durant Motors headquarters, producing the "Flint" car.

In 1984, Fisher #1 became BOC Flint Body Assembly. After Buick ceased building rear-wheel-drive cars and Buick City got underway, BOC Flint Body Assembly earned a reprieve by building bodies which were shipped to GM assembly operations in Pontiac, Michigan until the plant closed in December 1987. Most of it was demolished in 1988, except for portions which were gutted and transformed into the Great Lakes Technology Center; the original administration building remains intact. GM initially had substantial office and engineering operations at the GLTC (including AC Rochester world headquarters), but eventually transferred those staffs elsewhere.

==== Flint Plant #2 ====
This plant opened on Van Slyke Road in 1947 (on the same site as the Chevrolet Assembly plant), and made Chevrolet bodies; it was dissolved in 1970.

==== Grand Blanc Plant/Grand Blanc Weld Tool Center ====
On South Saginaw Street, it manufactured pressed-metal parts. Opened in 1942, it originally built tanks for World War II and is still sometimes called the "Tank Plant". It was transferred to BOC in 1984, and later to the newly formed Cadillac/Luxury Car Division (not to be confused with the Cadillac Motor Car Division). Most recently operated by the Metal Fabricating Division, this plant has recently all but eliminated its metal stamping operations and now serves as a corporation-wide weld-tooling center. According to GM's website, 411 hourly and 29 salaried workers are at Grand Blanc today.

GM announced in January 2013 that Grand Blanc Weld Tool would close to an extent in six months. Currently, it has been speculated that GM will redevelop the plant for larger operations and future use.

=== Ternstedt Division ===
==== Coldwater Road Plant ====
In Genesee Township, it opened to manufacture body hardware around 1953. The plant was originally intended to build aircraft engines for Buick during the Korean War, but never did.

In 1969, Ternstedt Division merged with Fisher Body Division (its original parent), which was dissolved in 1984 when its Coldwater Road plant was turned over to the newly formed Fisher Guide Division. Fisher Guide became Inland Fisher Guide Division in 1989. The Coldwater Road plant was renamed again in 1995, when the newly formed Delphi Automotive Systems took over. Finally, in 1996 Delphi sold the Coldwater Road factory to Peregrine Inc, which attempted to make the plant profitable before closing it around 1998. It was soon demolished.

== Roger & Me ==
Roger & Me is a 1989 American documentary film directed by Flint area native Michael Moore. Moore portrays the regional economic impact of General Motors CEO Roger Smith's action of closing several auto plants in his hometown of Flint, Michigan—reducing GM's employees in that area from 80,000 in 1978 to about 50,000 in 1992.

== GM operations in Genesee County ==
- Flint Assembly (Formerly called Truck & Bus Group)
- Flint Engine Operations
- Flint Metal Center (Formerly called Metal Fabricating Division)
- Flint Paint Operations
- Flint East Plants (and adjacent Service Parts Operations processing center in Burton)
- Flint Tool and Die
- Flint Body Shop
- General Motors Archive & Research Center (Housed in historical Durant-Dort Factory One Building in Downtown Flint)
- General Motors Foundations Automotive Research Area (Partnered with Kettering University consisting of Powertrain Research Lab and Proving Grounds)
- Grand Blanc Weld Tool Center
- Great Lakes Technology Center & Fisher Body Headquarters Building [Joint owned by IINN (Insight Institute of Neurosurgery & Neuroscience) & Diplomat Specialty Pharmacy of Flint, MI.]
- Service Parts Operations Warehouse and Processing Center (Swartz Creek)
- Service Parts Operations World Headquarters (Grand Blanc Township)

== See also ==
- Flint Sit-Down Strike
- History of General Motors
- List of GM factories
- The Paterson Building: built by auto pioneer William A. Paterson, of the Paterson Automotive Company. The Art Deco building still stands at the corner of S. Saginaw and Third streets, in downtown Flint.
