= Durant-Dort Factory One =

Historic building in Flint, Michigan

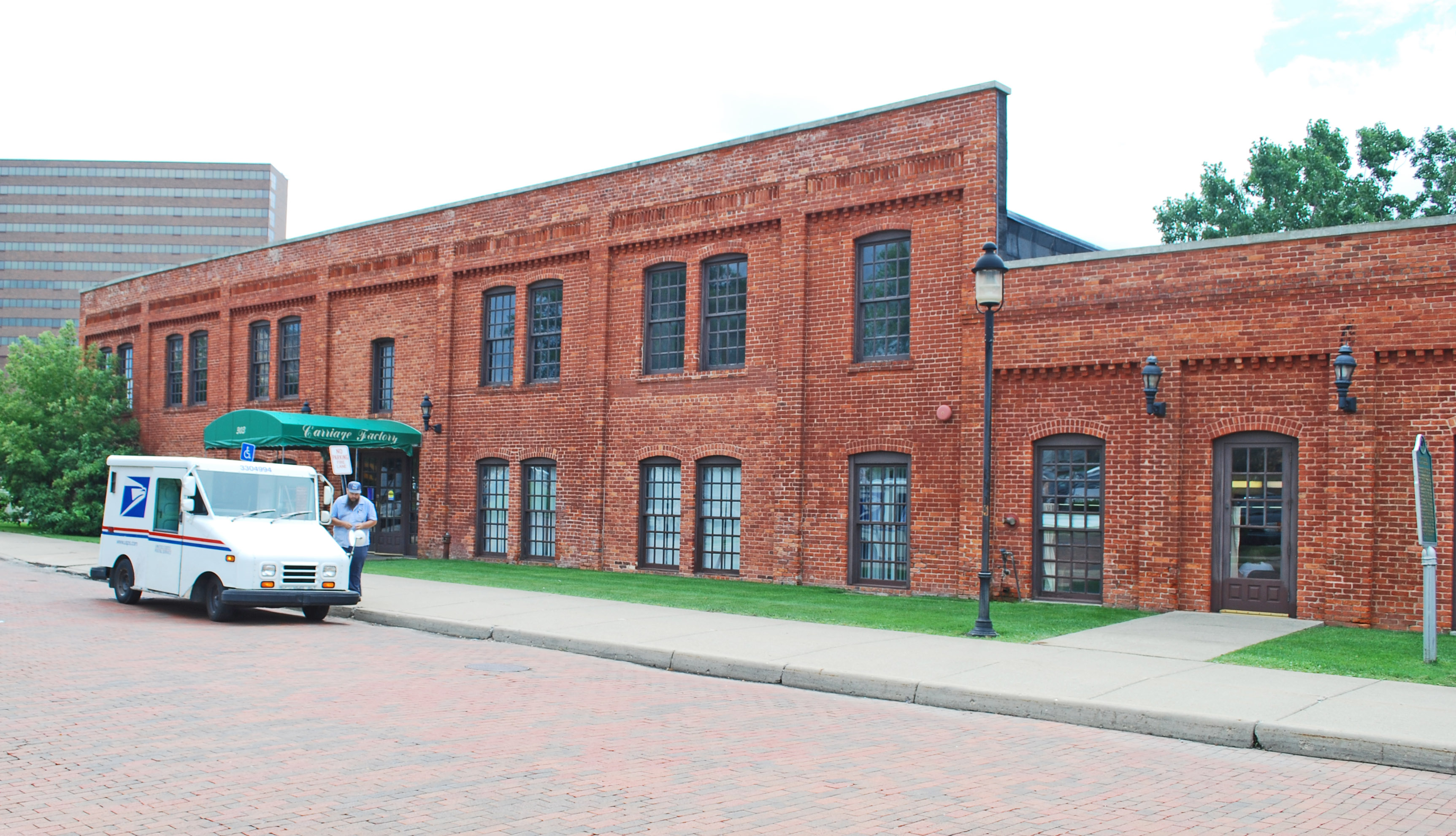
- Durant-Dort Factory One in 2010

- Location within Michigan
- Former names: Flint Road Cart Factory
- Alternative names: Durant-Dort Carriage Factory No. 1, Factory One

General information
- Location: Flint, Michigan, United States
- Coordinates: 43°01′02″N 83°41′43″W
- Current tenants: General Motors; Kettering University
- Completed: 1880
- Owner: General Motors

Website
- www.gmfactoryone.com

Durant-Dort Factory One (formally Durant-Dort Carriage Factory No. 1, formerly the Flint Road Cart Factory, and commonly known as Factory One) is a former cotton textile, carriage, and automobile factory in Flint, Michigan, that is now an archive and a center for research, meetings, and the community. The building was constructed in 1880 as a cotton textile factory. It produced carriages for the Durant-Dort Carriage Company from 1886 to 1917 and then produced cars for the Dort Motor Car Company from 1917 to 1924. It is often considered the birthplace of General Motors (GM).

Factory One housed numerous businesses between 1928 and 2013, when GM purchased it. Architectural firm SmithGroupJJR restored the interior and exterior of the building, which was reopened on May 1, 2017 as a conference and event space and as Kettering University's automotive archive.

== History ==
The Flint Woolen Mills company built Factory One as a cotton textile factory in 1880. It is located at 303 West Water Street in Flint, Michigan, in the Carriage Town neighborhood north of downtown, across the street from the Durant-Dort Carriage Company Office. William C. Durant and Josiah Dallas Dort leased the factory for $25 a month in 1886 and renamed it the Durant-Dort Carriage Factory after they founded the Flint Road Cart Company. The Flint Road Cart Company incorporated as the Durant-Dort Carriage Company in 1896 and produced carriages at Factory One until 1917, when the building was converted to automobile manufacturing for the Dort Motor Car Company. Automobile manufacturing continued at Factory One until the Dort Motor Car Company went defunct in 1924. Factory One is often considered the birthplace of General Motors (GM), even though it never built a car there, because Durant founded GM in 1908.

Factory One housed numerous businesses after 1928, and it was renovated in the 1980s before eventually falling into disrepair. Tenants of the building included furniture warehouses, paper and stationery companies, and wholesale grocers. In the 1980s, it housed an antiques mall, gift stores, medical and social services agencies, offices, and retail establishments. In the 1990s, it housed the Blarney Stone Restaurant, the Center for Gerontology, and Dale Kildee's congressional office, while it was once again home to medical and social services agencies early in the 21st century.

=== Restoration ===
GM executive vice president Mark Reuss became interested in restoring Factory One in 2012, leading GM to purchase the building in 2013 and begin exterior renovations; Ann Arbor-based architectural firm SmithGroupJJR did the restoration work. Exterior work included restoring the roof, repairing cracks in brick masonry load-bearing walls, installing 17,000 new bricks to replace damaged ones, replacing 20% of the building's mortar, and installing new windows and doors.

GM announced its intention to redevelop Factory One as an archive and a center for research, meetings, and the community in 2015, and began interior restoration work in 2016. The interior restoration included the removal of partitions, exposing Factory One's wooden ceiling and wooden columns, and the installation of electronics designed to blend into the historic interior of the building. GM spent more than $3 million preserving and restoring Factory One and reopened the fully renovated building on May 1, 2017.

== Current uses ==
Factory One is a conference and event space with a capacity of 300 people that generally caters to community and education groups, historical organizations, and vintage automobile clubs. GM has announced its intention to showcase historic vehicles and host new car reveals at the facility. At its reopening in 2017, the building displayed a historic carriage, a 1905 Buick Model C, and a 1913 Chevrolet Classic Six.

Factory One is also home to Kettering University's automotive archive, which was established by Kettering professor Richard P. Scharchburg in 1974. The archives are housed in a climate-controlled space spanning nearly 10,000 square feet (930 m^{2}) on the building's first floor. Located at the center of the building, this climate-controlled space is both glass-encased and vapor-sealed and it maintains a temperature of 72 °F (22 °C), plus or minus 2 °F, and 50% relative humidity, plus or minus 5%. The archives are open to the public without charge, and are also available for tours and outreach programs. In total, the archives contain roughly 100,000 documents, photographs, and other artifacts that document Flint's early automotive and manufacturing industry, including the papers of Harlow Curtice, William C. Durant, Elliott "Pete" Estes, Charles F. Kettering, and F. James McDonald. The archives at Factory One complement other archives in the city held at Kettering, the Sloan Museum, and the University of Michigan–Flint.
