= Durant-Dort Carriage Company Office =

- U.S. National Register of Historic Places
- U.S. National Historic Landmark
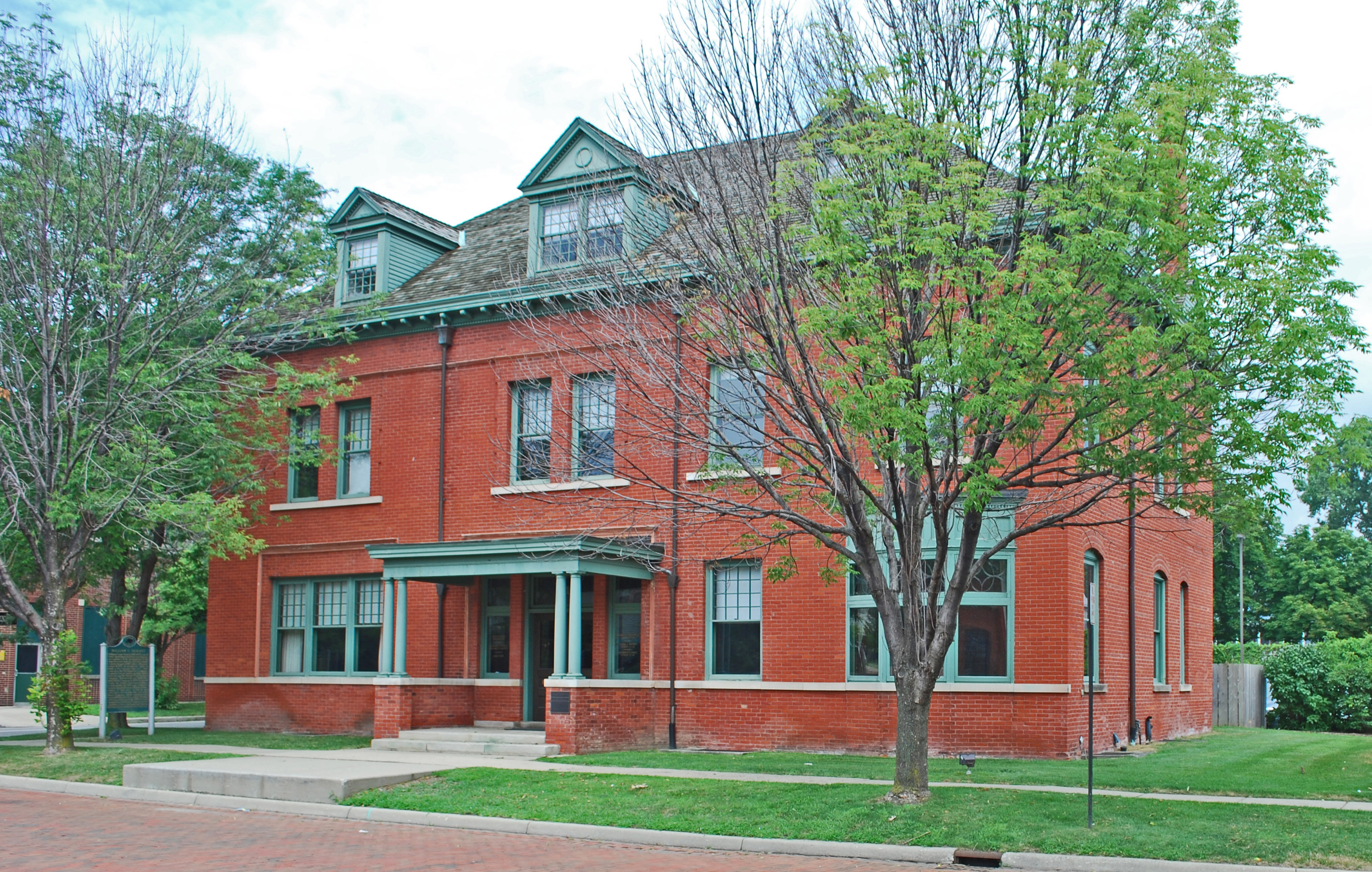
- (remodelled) 316 West Water Street, Flint 2010

- Location within Michigan Location within the United States
- Interactive map
- Location: 316 W. Water St., Flint, Michigan
- Coordinates: 43°1′2″N 83°41′46″W
- Built: 1895
- NRHP reference No.: 75000943

Significant dates
- Added to NRHP: September 2, 1975
- Designated NHL: June 2, 1978

The Durant-Dort Carriage Company Office is a National Historic Landmark owned by General Motors. A late 19th-century office building located at 316 West Water Street in Flint, Michigan, it was built and occupied by GM's parent, Durant-Dort, followed by Dort Motor Car Company, until 1924.

This building was the focal point of William C. Durant's efforts in building first carriages and then automobiles, and is the only extant building closely associated with Durant. Here pivotal decisions were made in the development and financing of the Buick Motor Company, the beginning of Chevrolet, and Durant's founding of General Motors.

The building was declared a National Historic Landmark in 1978.

== Description ==
The office building is a three-story red-brick rectangular structure, measuring 40 feet by 60 feet, on a brick foundation with a full basement. The windows are sixteen-over-one wood-sash windows in a flat-arched surround.

When built it was considered one of the finest office buildings in the country primarily because of the ornate interior. A number of the original interior original features remain, including first-floor wainscoting, much of the woodwork and some marble flooring.

== History ==
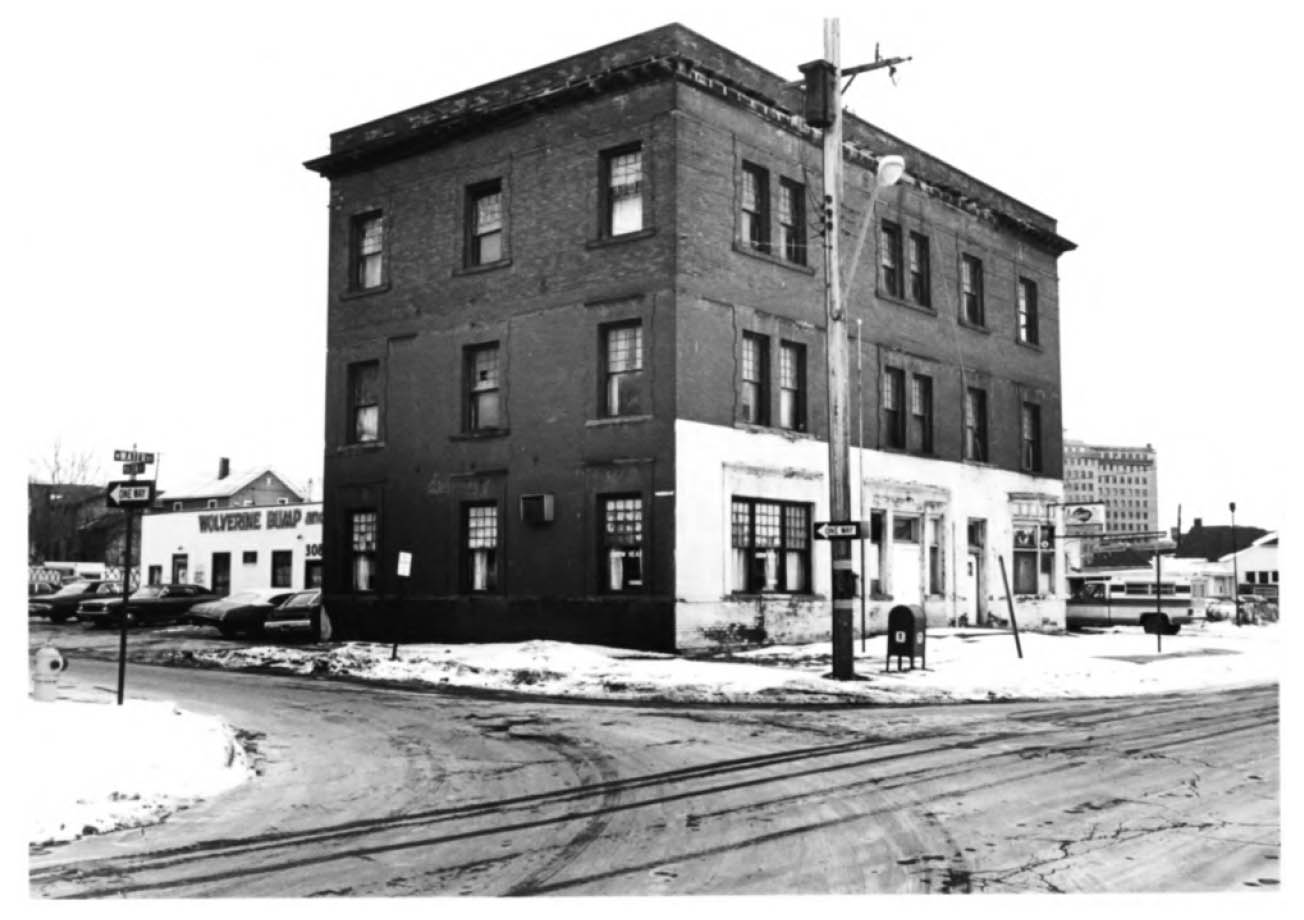
The 1895 offices and showroom at 316 West Water Street in Flint that was a showroom in 1977 before restoration of the building

The office building was constructed in 1895–96 to house Durant-Dort's offices and, on the second floor, their carriage showroom. A contemporaneous account describes it as "an elegant office in connection with [the] main factory, where clerks, stenographers, and typewriters are engaged in the clerical part of the company's business. Originally built as a two-story Italianate structure with a flat roof, its flat roof was replaced around 1900 with a hipped roof. An entrance portico was added, giving the structure a Georgian appearance. In 1906 a fire damaged the roof and, rather than repairing it, the company added an extra story and again capped the building with a flat roof. The portico was also removed at that time. This configuration remained until the 1980s.

After Dort Motor Car Company — which had taken over all the building in steps between 1915 and 1917 as carriage building came to a close — moved out in 1924 it provided office space for various service organizations such as the Red Cross and the local Chamber of Commerce. In 1947 the Arrowhead Veteran's Club bought it for its headquarters. Recognising its historic associations the city of Flint purchased it in 1977 with the help of an anonymous $55,000 donation.

== National Historic Landmark ==
It was designated a National Historic Landmark in 1978. Using the designation and the deteriorating condition of the building as an impetus the Genesee County Historical Society undertook the task of restoring the building. Funds were raised, and it was restored to its early 1900s condition with the hipped roof and portico of that time. This restoration was completed by 1986.

== Bought by General Motors ==
GM announced that it would purchase the Durant-Dort office building and nearby Factory One in May 2013. GM will take over responsibility for maintenance from the Flint Historical Foundation. Early reports indicated that the office building is to be restored and used as a showcase for company events.

As of 2017, the office building is occupied by the Genesee County Historical Society. General Motors provides funds for the operation and maintenance of the building, and is plans are in the works to conduct tours of the office and the nearby "Factory One," the original factory building associated with the Durant-Dort Carriage Company.

== See also ==
- Ford Piquette Avenue Plant
- List of National Historic Landmarks in Michigan
- National Register of Historic Places listings in Genesee County, Michigan
