= Flint Automobile Company =

Defunct American motor vehicle manufacturer

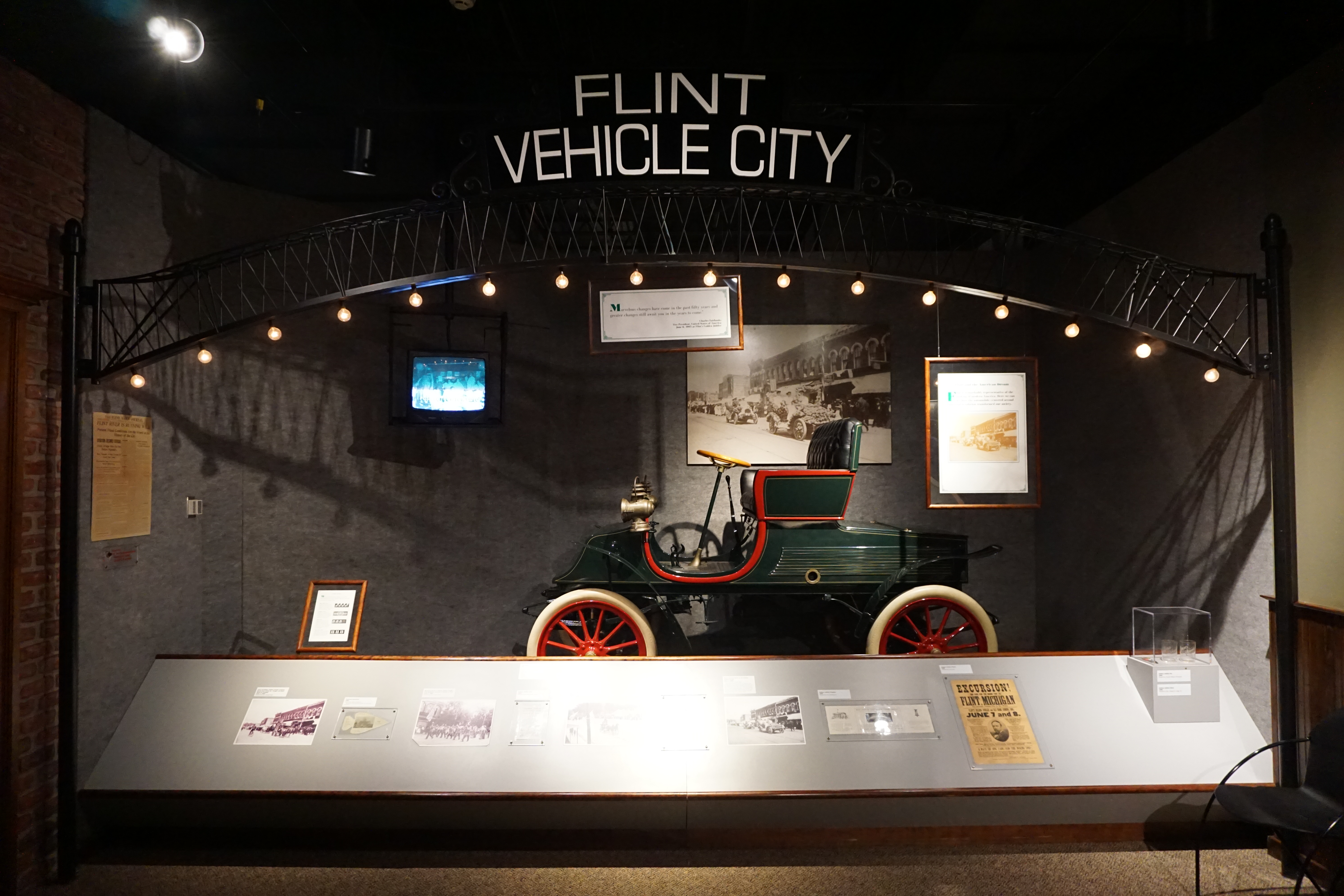
- Industry: Automotive
- Founded: 1901
- Founder: A. B. C. Hardy
- Defunct: 1903
- Fate: closed 1903
- Headquarters: Flint, Michigan
- Products: Automobiles

Flint Automobile Company was founded by A. B. C. Hardy in 1901 and went out of business in 1903 after manufacturing only 52 automobiles in the $750–$850 price range.

== History ==
Alexander Brownell Cullen Hardy (1869–1948) began working at Durant-Dort in 1889. By 1895, he was supervising production of the Diamond, a low-cost buggy. In 1898, J. Dallas Dort took a two-year leave of absence from his position as president of Durant-Dort, and Hardy stepped into his place.

After Dort's return in 1900, Hardy took his own leave of absence, and while touring Europe discovered the automobile. On his return, he supposedly told Durant to "get out of the carriage business before the automobile ruins you." Although Durant didn't act at the time, Hardy struck out on his own and established Flint's first automotive manufacturer, in 1901.

However, the company's Roadster failed to distinguish itself from the popular, lower-priced Oldsmobile, and in 1903 the Flint Automobile Company folded. Hardy returned to Durant-Dort and wound up as vice-president of General Motors until his retirement in 1925.

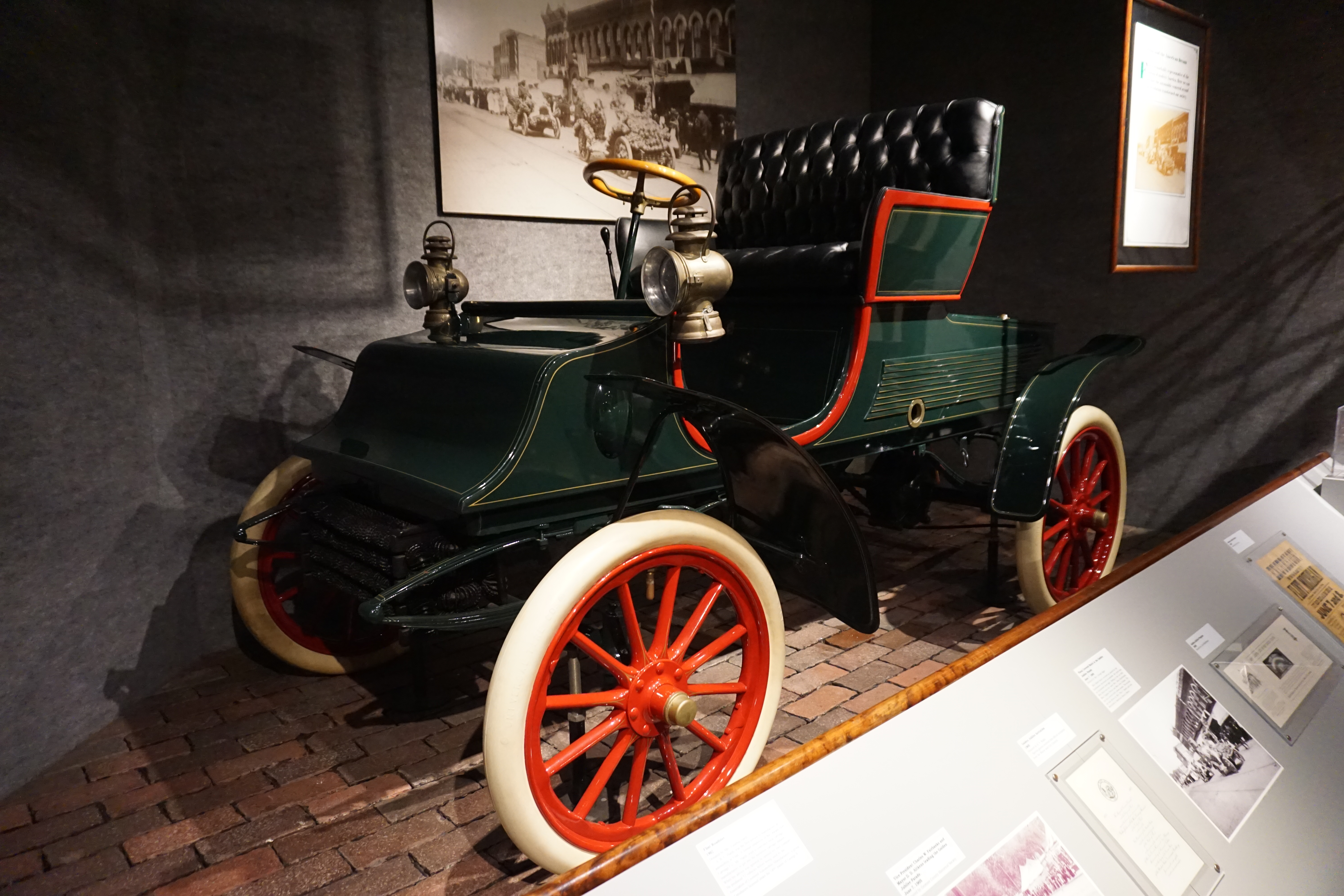
1902

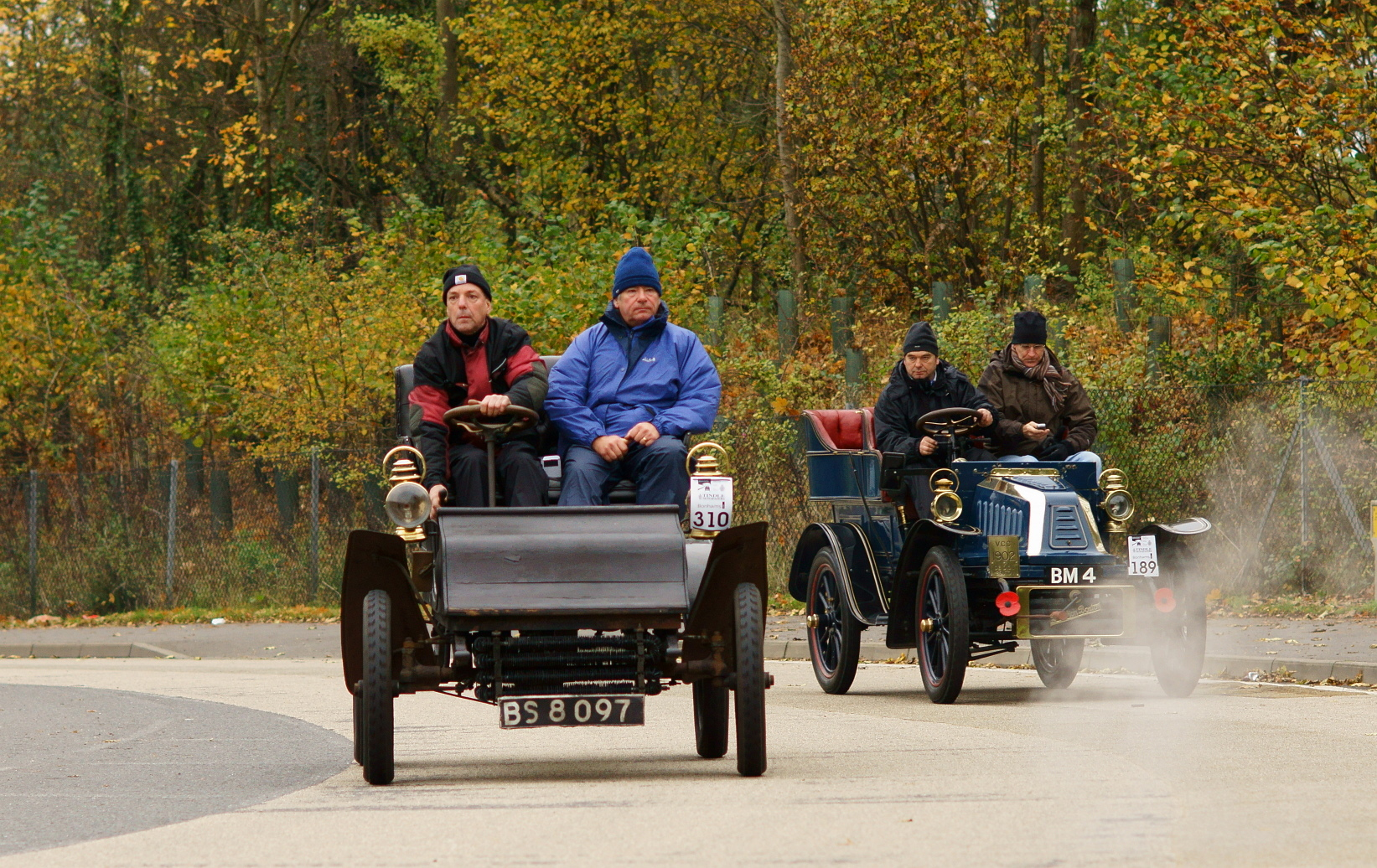
1903

1903
