= Flint East =

Production plant

Coordinates: 43°1′47.21″N 83°39′2.89″W

Flint East was an automobile component production complex owned by Delphi Corporation in Flint, Michigan. The complex, parts of which were over 100 years old, was located on Dort Highway, stretching along Robert T. Longway Boulevard past Center Road. The plant produced numerous automotive components, including instrument panels, instrument clusters, spark plugs, filters, air meters, fuel pumps and other parts. Flint East once employed nearly 14,000 people, but by 2007, the number was down to nearly 1,100 hourly workers. The plant closed entirely in November 2013 and the remaining buildings were razed. In 2017, Phoenix Investors, a Wisconsin-based commercial real estate firm, purchased the land.

Delphi's Flint Technical Center was also located on the site. In March 2007, it was announced that the company's technical centers, including Flint, would be consolidated to a single facility in Auburn Hills, Michigan.

Hourly workers at the plant were represented by UAW Local 651.

== History ==
After losing control of Champion Ignition Company, Albert Champion founded the AC Spark Plug Company in 1908 in a Buick building in Flint, Michigan. It was purchased by General Motors Corporation in 1909 to supply the growing automobile company, and AC Spark Plug moved a few years later to a factory at Harriet Street and Industrial Avenue.

The Dort Motor Car Company began building automobiles on the east side of the city in 1915, in a factory that would later be part of Flint East. In 1924, an economic downturn weakened the company and J. Dallas Dort's health began to fail, and the company folded and the complex was sold to AC Spark Plug in 1925.

AC Spark Plug continued operations in both the Harriet Street and Dort Highway facilities until 1975, when the Harriet Street plant was closed and razed. In 1987, AC took over the former Chevrolet facilities on Chevrolet Avenue in Flint, naming that complex Flint West, and the Dort Highway facility became Flint East. The following year, AC Spark Plug and Rochester Products Division merged, becoming AC Rochester. For a time, the division's headquarters remained at Flint East, but soon moved to the Great Lakes Tech Center on the old Fisher #1 site.

Further consolidation among GM's divisions led to the division being renamed AC Delco Systems in 1994, and in 1995, the entire Automotive Components Group became Delphi Automotive Systems.

In 1998, fearing a strike over a $200 million investment that had not materialized, GM began to pull critical dies from the Flint Metal Fab plant on the other side of town, to be shipped to another plant. The UAW workers at the plant immediately went on strike to protest the move. Mostly in response to this, but also because of fears that their own work would be moved elsewhere, workers at Flint East went on strike a week later on June 11. Since Flint East was the sole source of some parts for almost the entire company, within two weeks, virtually all of General Motors was shut down. On July 28, GM agreed to the investment to Flint Metal Fab and to keep Flint East open until at least 2000. The union agreed to cooperate on efforts to increase productivity at both plants. The strike cost GM an estimated US$2.8 billion.

Shortly after the strike, it was announced that Delphi would be spun off in 1999 into what is now Delphi Corporation, and Flint East was for a time part of Delphi's Energy and Engine Management Systems division. In 2002, ongoing financial problems caused the plant to be placed in the Automotive Holdings Group, a collection of under performing plants that Delphi felt needed to be fixed, sold, or closed. Delphi declared bankruptcy in October 2005, and announced plans to close or sell 21 of its 29 US plants by Jan 1, 2008, including Flint East. Spark plug production, already greatly reduced, ended in early 2006. The plant has since been razed since early 2010 according to Flint-based newspaper The Flint Journal and WJRT-12, an ABC affiliate.

Under an agreement reached by Delphi, General Motors, and the UAW in June 2007, Flint East and two other plants would remain open, but operated by GM or a third party designated by GM. Four other UAW-represented plants would be kept by Delphi, four sold, and at least ten others closed under the agreement.

=== Flint Faience Tile ===
In 1921, Champion founded the Flint Faience Tile Company in a building adjacent to the Harriet Street factory, firing decorative tiles in the same kilns as spark plugs. This was done so they could avoid shutting down the kilns when they were finished with spark plug production, because repeated cycles of cooling and reheating would damage the kilns. When AC expanded its operations to the former Dort Motor complex, Flint Faience moved to a new building there. The northwest portion of the plant still has these tiles along the outside, visible from Dort Highway and Davison Road. In 1933, General Motors closed the tile operation because of increased demand on the kilns for spark plugs.
