= Durant-Dort Carriage Company =

Manufacturer of horse-drawn vehicles

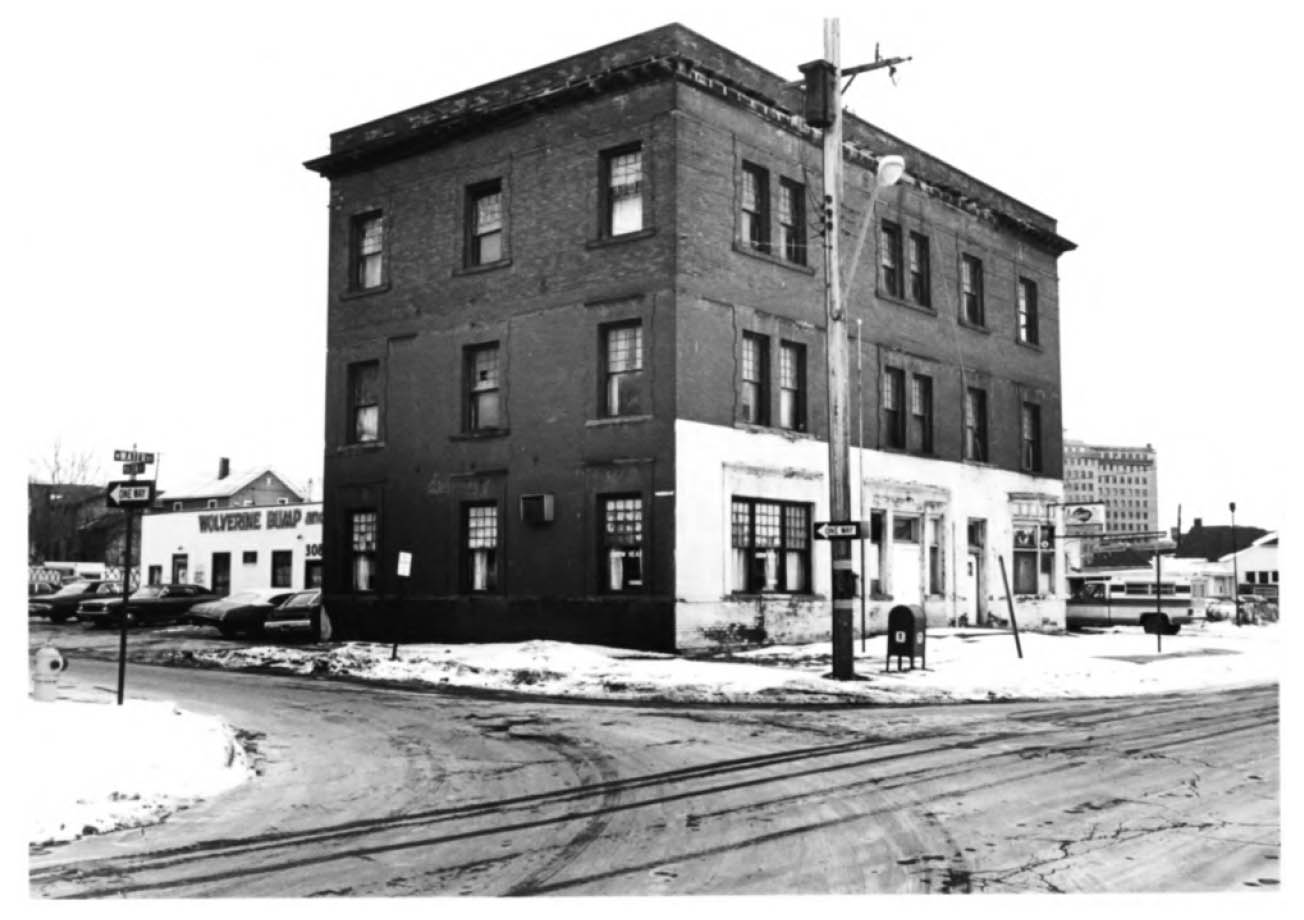
Water Street offices and showroom in 1977 before restoration

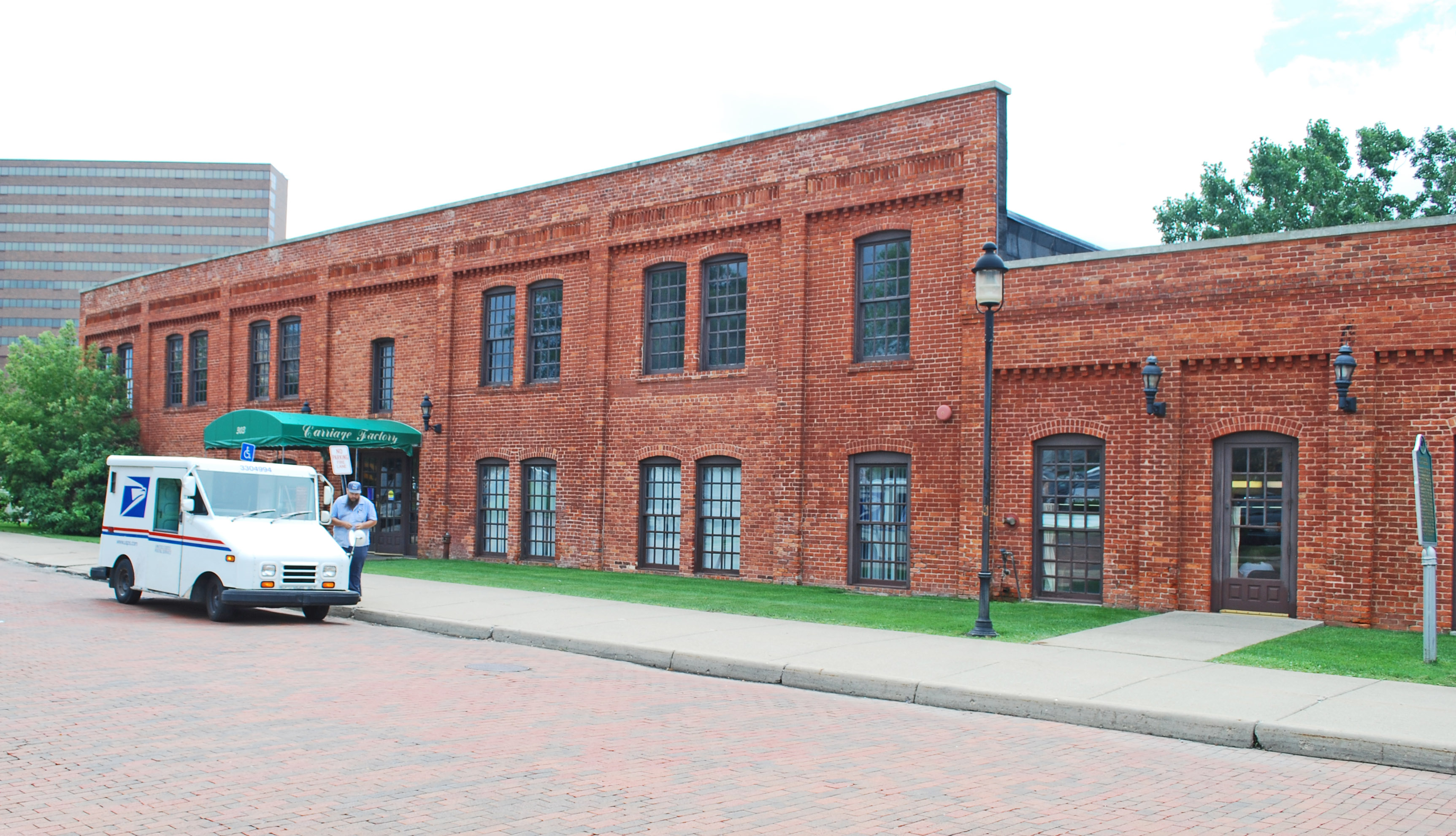
The Water Street factory leased by Durant and Dort in 1893

Durant-Dort Carriage Company was a manufacturer of horse-drawn vehicles in Flint, Michigan. Founded in 1886, by 1900 it was the largest carriage manufacturer in the country.

This very successful business made the partners rich men and it became the core on which William C. Durant and J. Dallas Dort began to build General Motors.

Durant sold out of this business in 1914 and it stopped manufacturing carriages in 1917. Durant-Dort Carriage Company was dissolved in 1924.

The premises were taken over by J Dallas Dort's Dort Motor Car Company, which he closed in 1924.

== Flint Road-Cart Company ==
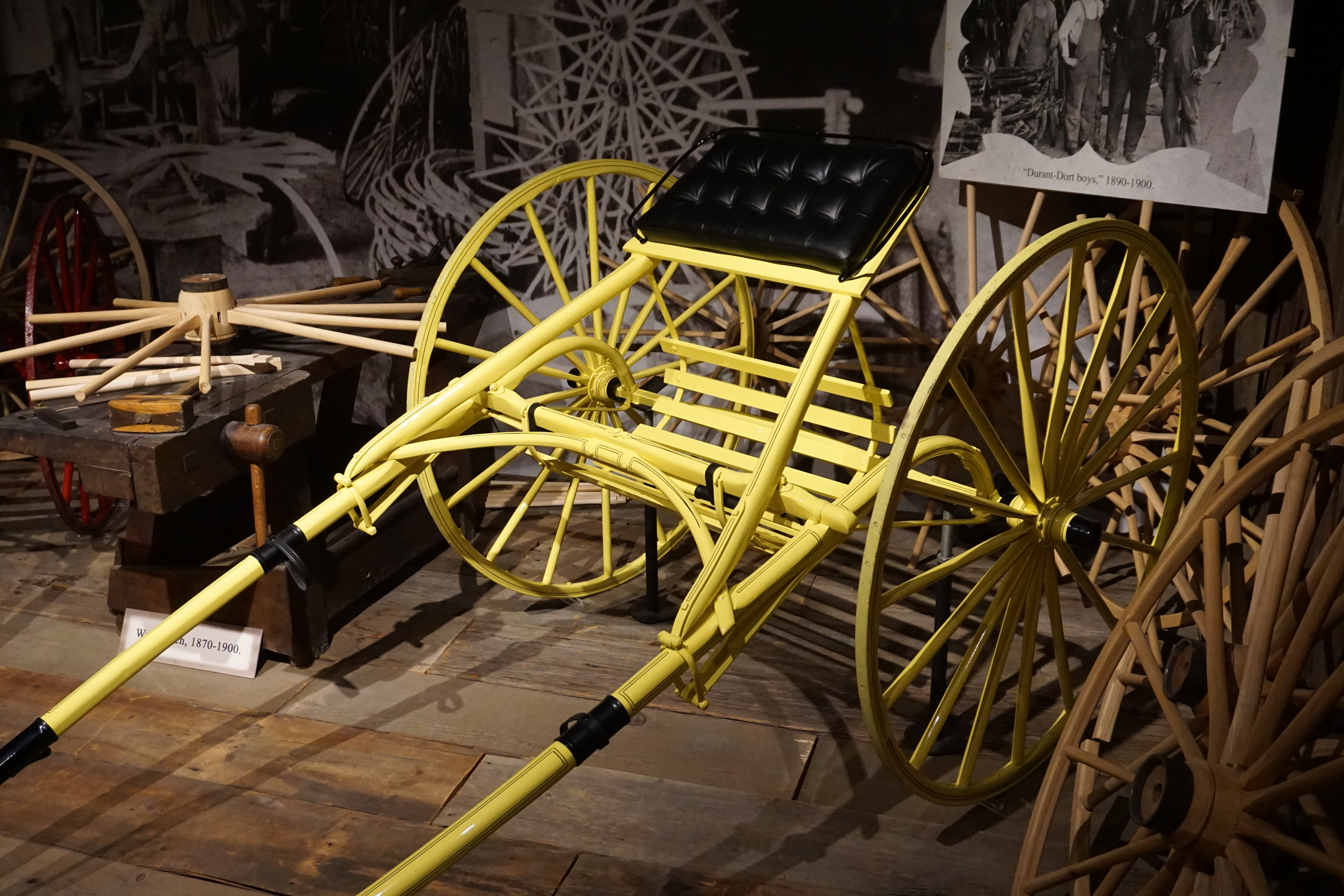
Flint Road-Cart Company road-cart at the Sloan Museum

In 1886 William C. Durant rode in a friend's spring-suspension (Note: The seat with attached footrest was supported above the axle by long cantilevers. The cantilevers which freely pivoted on their fulcrum were supported by leaf springs fixed to the shafts.) road-cart built by the Coldwater Road-Cart Company of Coldwater, Michigan. Impressed with the smoothness of the ride, Durant went to Coldwater and bought the road-cart's patent and manufacturing rights from Schmedlin and O'Brien for $1500. With Josiah Dallas Dort as an equal partner he founded Flint Road-Cart Company. Dort as president, handled administrative details for the firm and manufacturing arrangements — to begin with the carts were made for them by William A. Paterson — while Durant handled sales and promotion. Their first office was in Durant's fire insurance agency in downtown Flint.

Durant had bought the rights to the road-cart with borrowed money so newly married Durant immediately left Flint and set up a chain of jobbers to sell the carts as far away as Madison, Milwaukee and Chicago. With just one finished cart at home he returned from his first trip with orders for 600 road-carts. Flint Road-Cart sold 4000 carts its first year, and grew quickly from there.

In 1893 they incorporated Flint Road-Cart Company with a substantial capital, much of it raised from local investors, and leased a factory on Water Street originally used by the Flint Woolen Mills. There they assembled their road-carts from bought-in components. After that, Flint Road-Cart expanded by starting or buying other businesses that produced not only vehicles, but the components for vehicles as well. They marketed them as "Blue Ribbon Vehicles".

== Durant-Dort Carriage Company ==
Flint Road-Cart Company changed its name to Durant-Dort Carriage Company in November 1895. By 1900 they were building 50,000 vehicles each year, from around 14 locations and they were a major rival of Flint Wagon Works. In 1906 they were making 480 vehicles each day with 1,000 workers. Durant-Dort owned not just the Flint manufacturing works, but also other vehicle assembly plants in Michigan, Georgia, and Ontario, together with timberland, lumber mills, a wheel manufacturer, the Flint Axle Works, and the Flint Varnish Works.

=== Diamond Buggy Company ===
A separate business named Diamond Buggy Company was established in 1896 to build low-priced carts sold for cash only. The first plant manager was A. B. C. Hardy.

=== Manufacture of own components ===
- 1897: established Flint Gear and Top Company
- 1898: bought Imperial Wheel Company, Jackson. Imperial Wheel was later moved to Flint and Buick took over the Jackson plant
- 1900: established Flint Axle Works on a farm just north of Flint where the unavoidable noise would give less offence
- 1901: Flint Varnish Works

Durant decided making their own components instead of buying them in would give Durant-Dort better control over costs and the ability to improve efficiency. All component factories were relocated to Flint to further speed production. These extra activities placed a lot of pressure on Durant's friends. Dallas Dort left the business in 1898 and didn't return until 1900.

Hardy was sent on a tour of Europe in 1901. On that holiday he became fascinated by automobiles. In 1902 he established his Flint Automobile Company and built over fifty cars with Weston-Mott axles and W F Stewart bodies. The Association of Licensed Automobile Manufacturers demanded a licence fee of $50 for each engine Hardy had built so he ended production and "moved to Iowa".

== Dort Motor Car Company ==
Durant-Dort continued making horse-drawn vehicles until 1917 but from 1915 the factory and office buildings refocused on the manufacture of Dort Motor Car Company automobiles. J. Dallas Dort began his own independent automotive business, Dort Motor Car Company, in 1915. Dort used the old Durant-Dort buildings but added more to them. Dort shipped 9000 cars in its first year. J Dallas Dort decided to retire and liquidated Dort Motor Car Company in 1924 and died the following year.

== Associates ==
=== A.B.C. Hardy's Flint Automobile Company ===
Alexander Brownell Cullen Hardy (1869–1948) began working at Durant-Dort in 1889. By 1895, he was supervising production of the Diamond, a low-cost buggy. In 1898, J. Dallas Dort took a two-year leave of absence from his position as president of Durant-Dort, and Hardy stepped into his place. After Dort's return in 1900, Hardy took his own leave of absence, and while touring Europe discovered the automobile. On his return, he supposedly told Durant to "get out of the carriage business before the automobile ruins you." Although Durant didn't act at the time, Hardy struck out on his own and established the Flint Automobile Company, Flint's first automotive manufacturer, in 1901. However, the company's Roadster failed to distinguish itself from the popular, lower-priced Oldsmobile, and in 1903 the Flint Automobile Company folded. Hardy returned to Durant-Dort and wound up as vice-president of General Motors until his retirement in 1925.

=== Flint Wagon Works and Buick ===
Durant began to lose interest in Flint activities and set up an office in New York. A.B.C. Hardy tried to interest him in automobiles. Eventually James Whiting of Flint Wagon Works persuaded Durant to take what became a consuming interest in Flint Wagon Works' Buick automobile venture. Durant used his own capital and that of Durant-Dort to buy control of Buick. David Buick, already a minority partner in his own business, was left with a single share of his enterprise. However, Durant agreed to keep Buick on as an employee, and Buick remained with the firm until 1906, when Durant bought out his single share for $100,000.

=== McLaughlin Carriage Company ===
Other automobile pioneers were associated with the Durant-Dort Carriage Company. R. S. McLaughlin headed the McLaughlin Motor Car Company in Oshawa, Ontario. Its carriage builder parent was started in 1867 and by 1900 built more carriages than any other Canadian business. W. C. Durant and his Canadian-born son-in-law and business confidant, Dr. Edwin Campbell, were friends with the McLaughlins and they made cross stock-holdings in each other's automobile businesses. Campbell was a school friend of R. S. McLaughlin.

=== Nash Motors ===
Charles W. Nash began working at Durant-Dort in 1891 working in the cushion department, but soon worked his way up to foreman, and, by 1898, factory superintendent. Nash was named a director and vice-president of the firm in 1900, a position he held until 1913. In 1910, Nash was hired as general manager of General Motors, and in 1917 founded Nash Motors.

== See also ==
- Ford Piquette Avenue Plant
- List of National Historic Landmarks in Michigan
- National Register of Historic Places listings in Genesee County, Michigan
