= Hourly worker =

Employee paid per hour of work

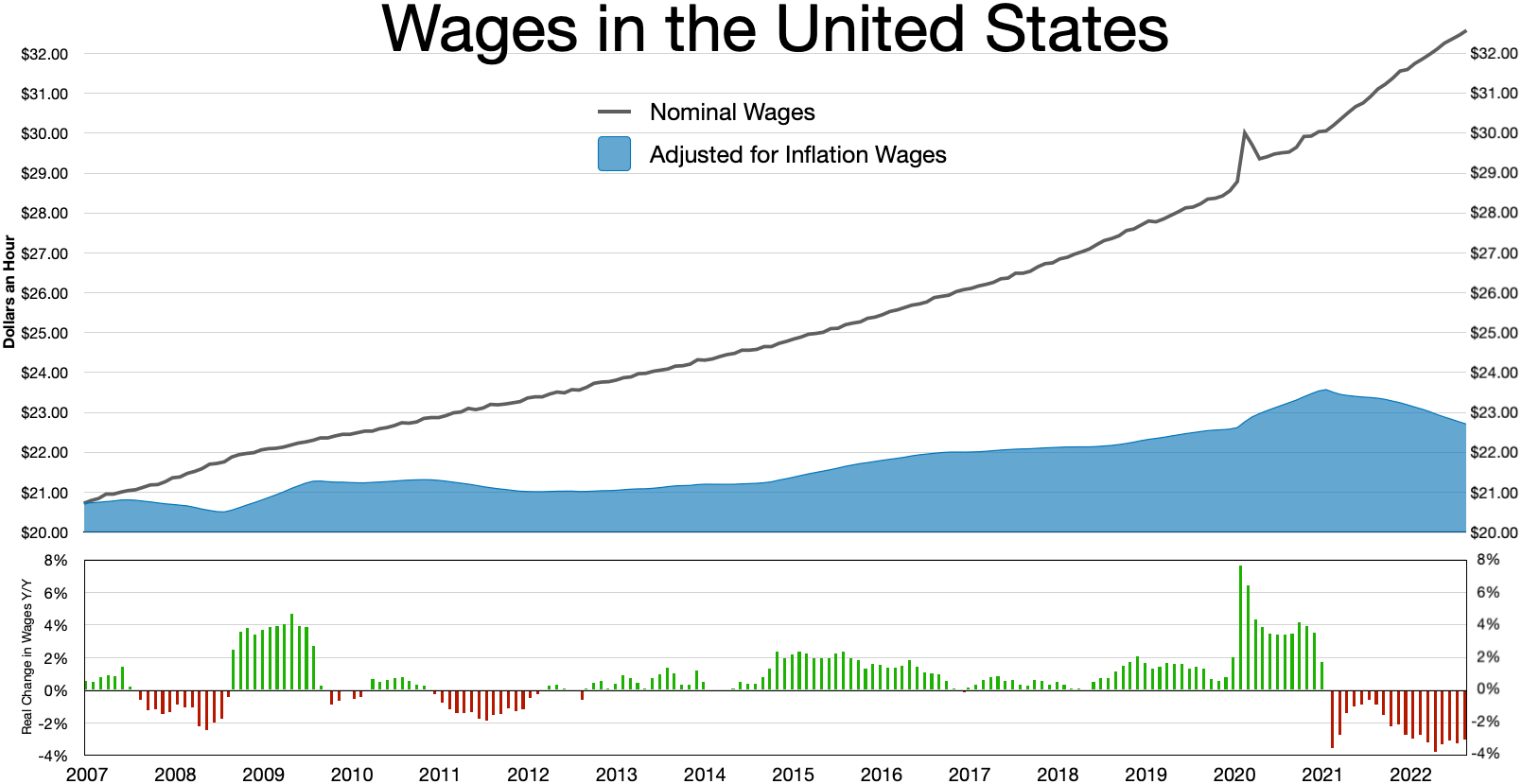
Wages in the United States Nominal wages Adjusted for inflation wages

An hourly worker or hourly employee is an employee paid an hourly wage for their services, as opposed to a fixed salary. Hourly workers may often be found in service and manufacturing occupations, but are common across a variety of fields. Hourly employment is often associated but not synonymous with at-will employment.

Most countries operate minimum wage systems, which set a minimum rate of pay for hourly employees. As of October 2023, France has the highest hourly minimum wage at $13.80 per hour. The United States has a comparatively low minimum wage for hourly workers at $7.25 per hour. Unusually, this rate does not apply to tipped employees, who are only entitled to an hourly wage of $2.13, which contributes to a strong tipping culture in the country. As a tipped employee, wages plus tips must equal the standard minimum wage or the employer is required to provide the difference.

== Earned wage access ==
Earned wage access is a financial service offered to hourly employees who are given access to a portion of their accrued paycheck until the end of their payroll cycle.

The technology to access the earned income can be implemented in a variety of ways: automatically credited to a prepaid card, deposited via ACH to the user's existing direct deposit or, in a bifocal approach, the accrued income is transferred to a bank account opened by the EWA provider.

In August 2016, Uber pioneered EWA in partnership with Green Dot, allowing drivers to request their earnings after each ride in exchange for a small payment.

In July 2018, ADP, America's largest payroll provider, began offering the EWA solution in its marketplace.

In May 2019, Lyft introduced a similar feature for its drivers in partnership with Mastercard.

On April 19, 2024, Governor Laura Kelly (D-KS) signed the fourth Earned Workforce Access Act (EWA) into law in the United States. The bill received broad bipartisan support in the Kansas House and Senate.

Earned income access providers are positioned as an ethical solution for payday lenders because they typically charge a small flat fee rather than interest, and there is no recourse, credit implications or underwriting for earned income access transactions.
