= Josiah Dallas Dort =

American automobile pioneer (1861–1925)

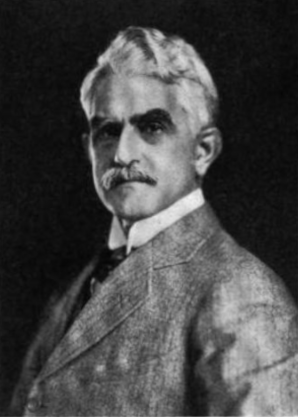
- Born: February 27, 1861; Inkster, Michigan
- Died: May 17, 1925 (aged 64); Flint, Michigan
- Resting place: Glenwood Cemetery
- Occupation: Businessman
- Spouses: Nellie M. Bates (m. 1887; died 1900) Marcia Webb (m. 1907)
- Children: 5

Josiah Dallas Dort (February 27, 1861 – May 17, 1925) was an American engineer and automobile pioneer of the United States automobile industry. He was born in Inkster, Michigan on February 27, 1861. His father was a well-to-do county squire and merchant, well connected politically, who died in 1871 when Josiah was 10. Dort left school at age 15 to help his mother in business and to work at a crockery firm. He moved to Flint, Michigan in 1879. In 1881, he began working at a Flint hardware store, and within a few years opened his own hardware store.

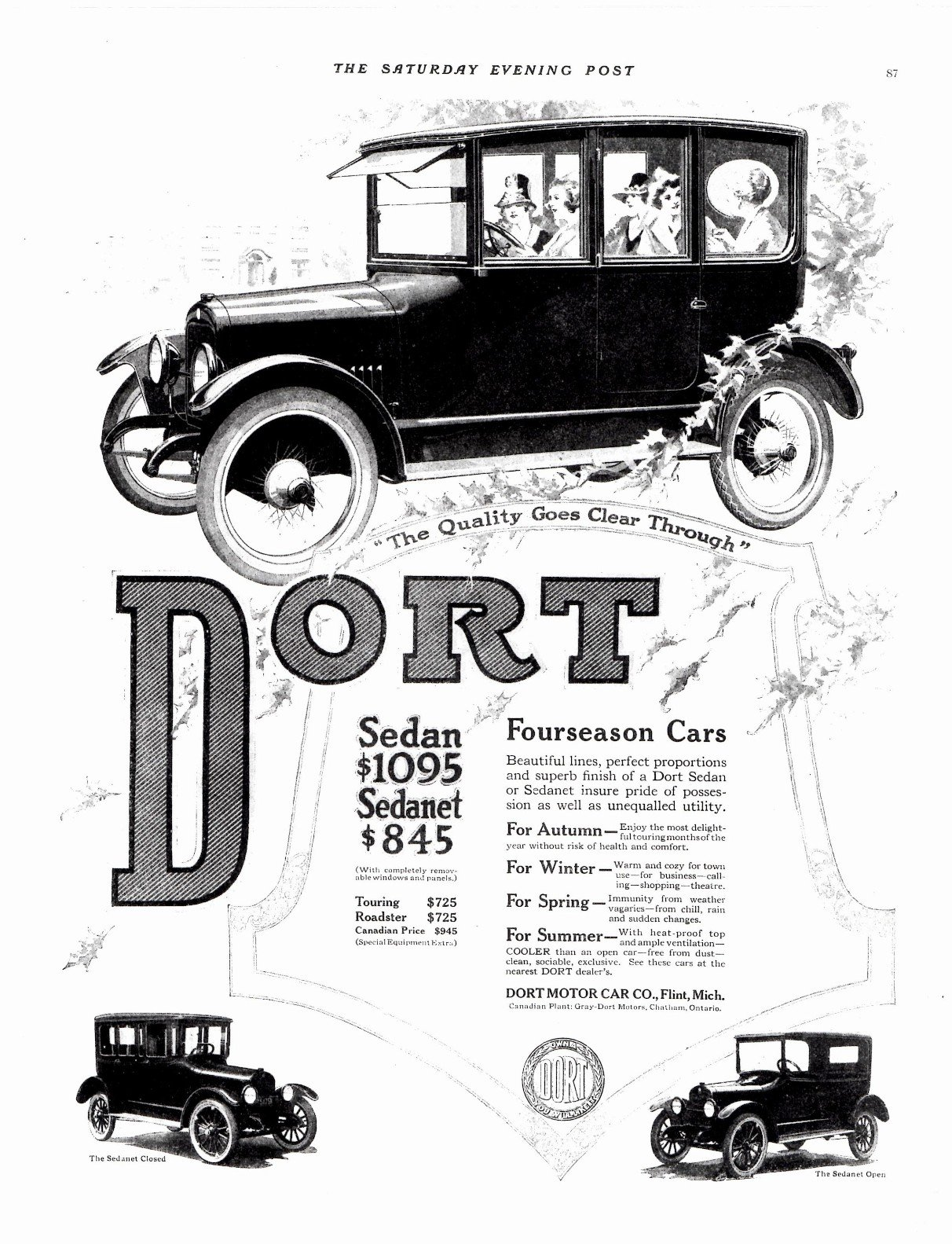

Location of Flint Institute of Music

He made a $1,000 investment in 1886 (equivalent to $31,000 in 2024) to become a partner with William C. Durant in a new carriage business called the Flint Road-Cart Company. Durant was the salesman and Dort the partnership's administrator, running the factories. Together they made Durant-Dort one of the world's largest carriage producers. Dort and Durant invested in a controlling interest in Buick in 1904 when the new owner ran short of capital. Durant's marketing ability was an overwhelming success, and they formed General Motors in 1908. Durant lost control of GM to bankers in 1911 and they re-established themselves by creating a new brand of automobile, Chevrolet. Dort was president of Chevrolet but the following year, in 1915, he left and founded Dort Motor Car Company. By 1920 Dort was the country's 13th largest automobile producer but in 1924 Dort decided to retire and liquidated Dort Motor Car Company. He sold the factory building to AC Spark Plug.

Dort had many involvements outside his business interests. Music institutions (Flint Institute of Music is built on the site of his home and its main offices are in the Dort Music Centre), a mutual benefit association for his employees which paid their medical bills, the local Shakespeare club, Knights Templar of the Masonic Order, Flint YMCA, Flint's first hospital—now Hurley Medical Center.

Flint area trunkline Dort Highway (M-54) is named in his honor.

== Personal life ==
Dort married Nellie M. Bates on January 12, 1887, and they had two children. She died in 1900, and he remarried to Marcia Webb on May 8, 1907. They had three children.

He died due to heart disease while playing a round of golf on May 17, 1925, aged 64. Dort was interred at Glenwood Cemetery.

== See also ==
- Flint, Michigan auto industry
- History of General Motors
