= Dort Motor Car Company =

U.S. automotive manufacturer 1915–24

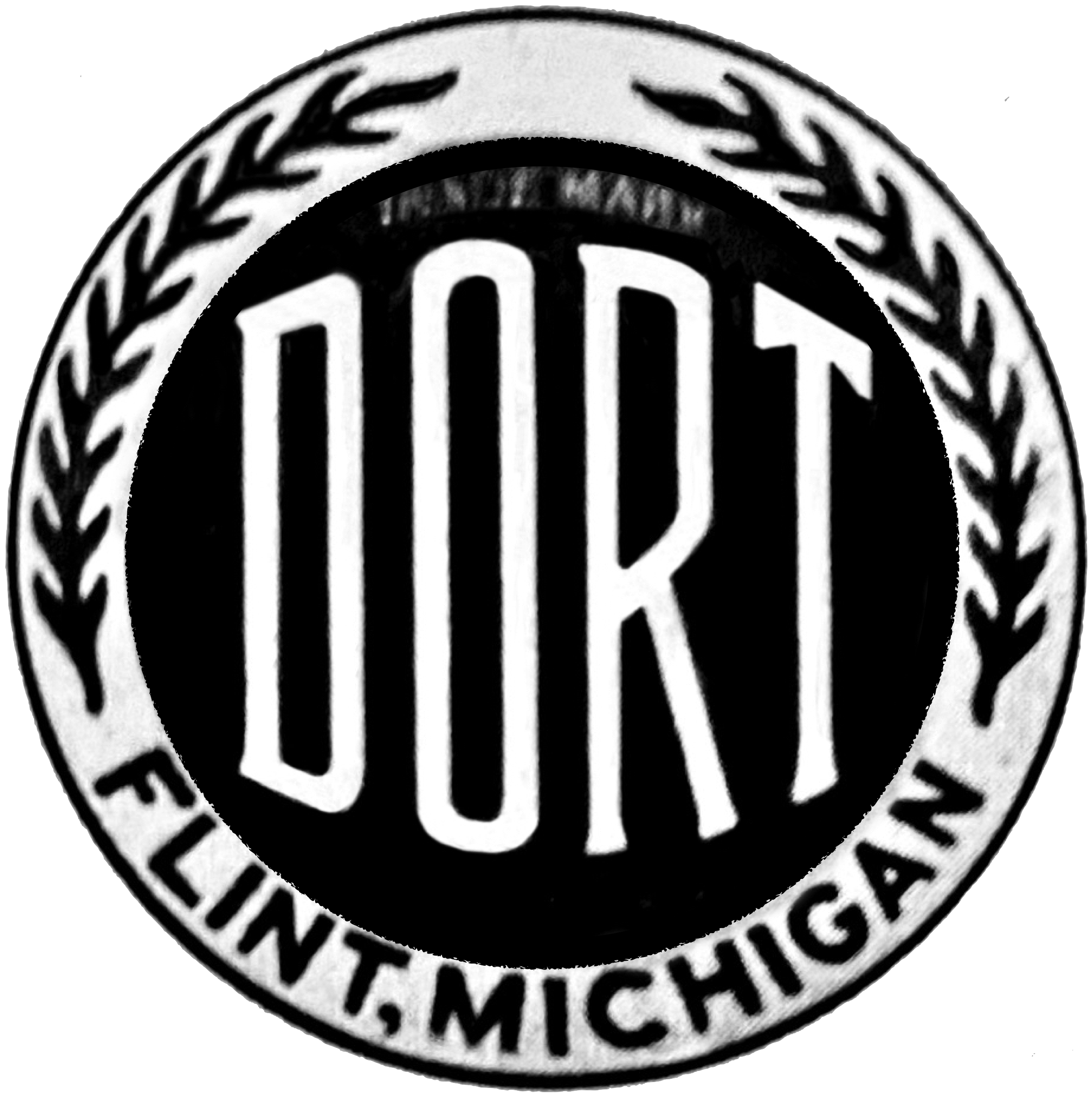
- Dort Motor Car Company logo
- Industry: Automotive manufacturing
- Founded: 1915; 111 years ago
- Founder: Josiah Dallas Dort
- Defunct: 1924
- Headquarters: Flint, Michigan

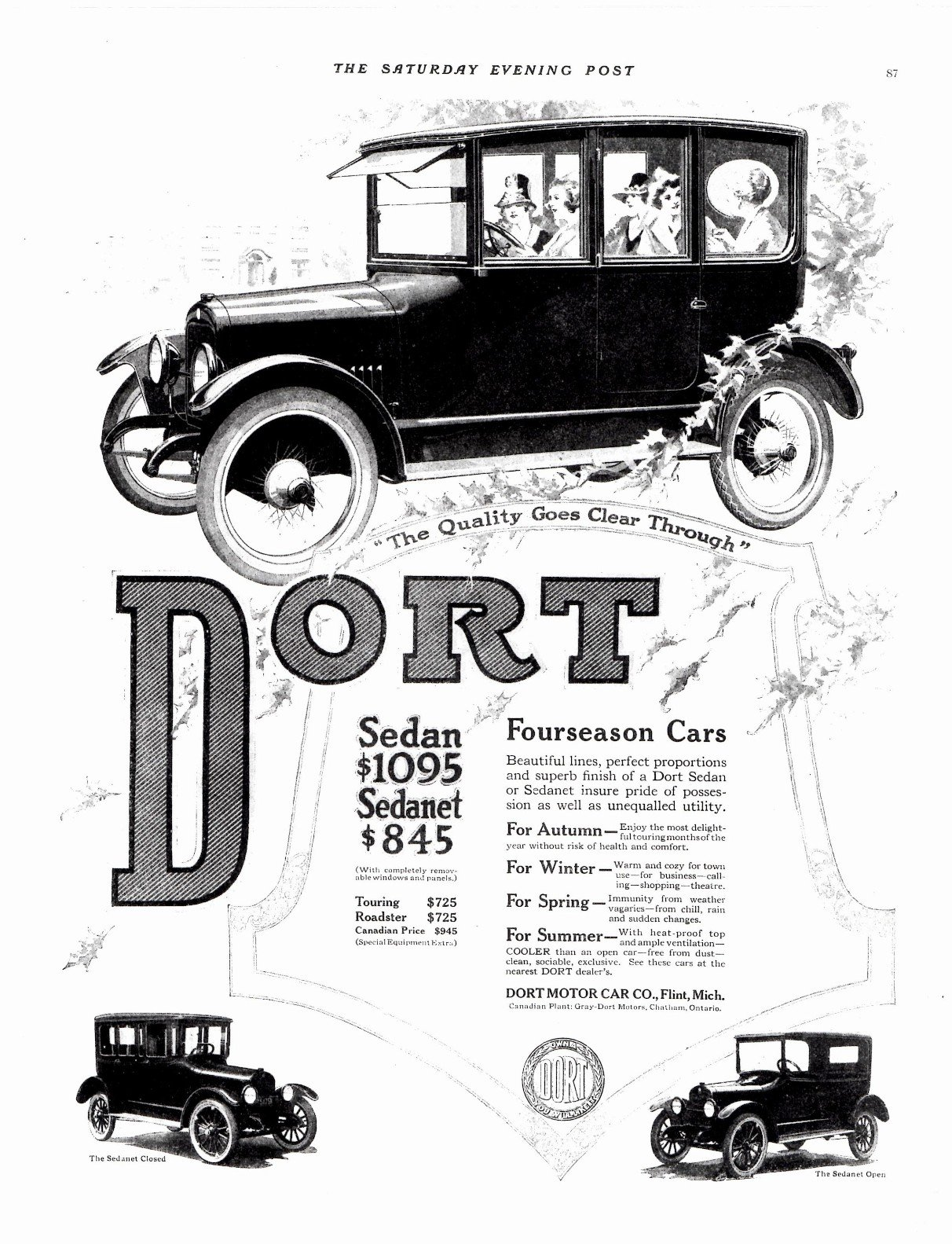
1918 Dort sedan and sedanet

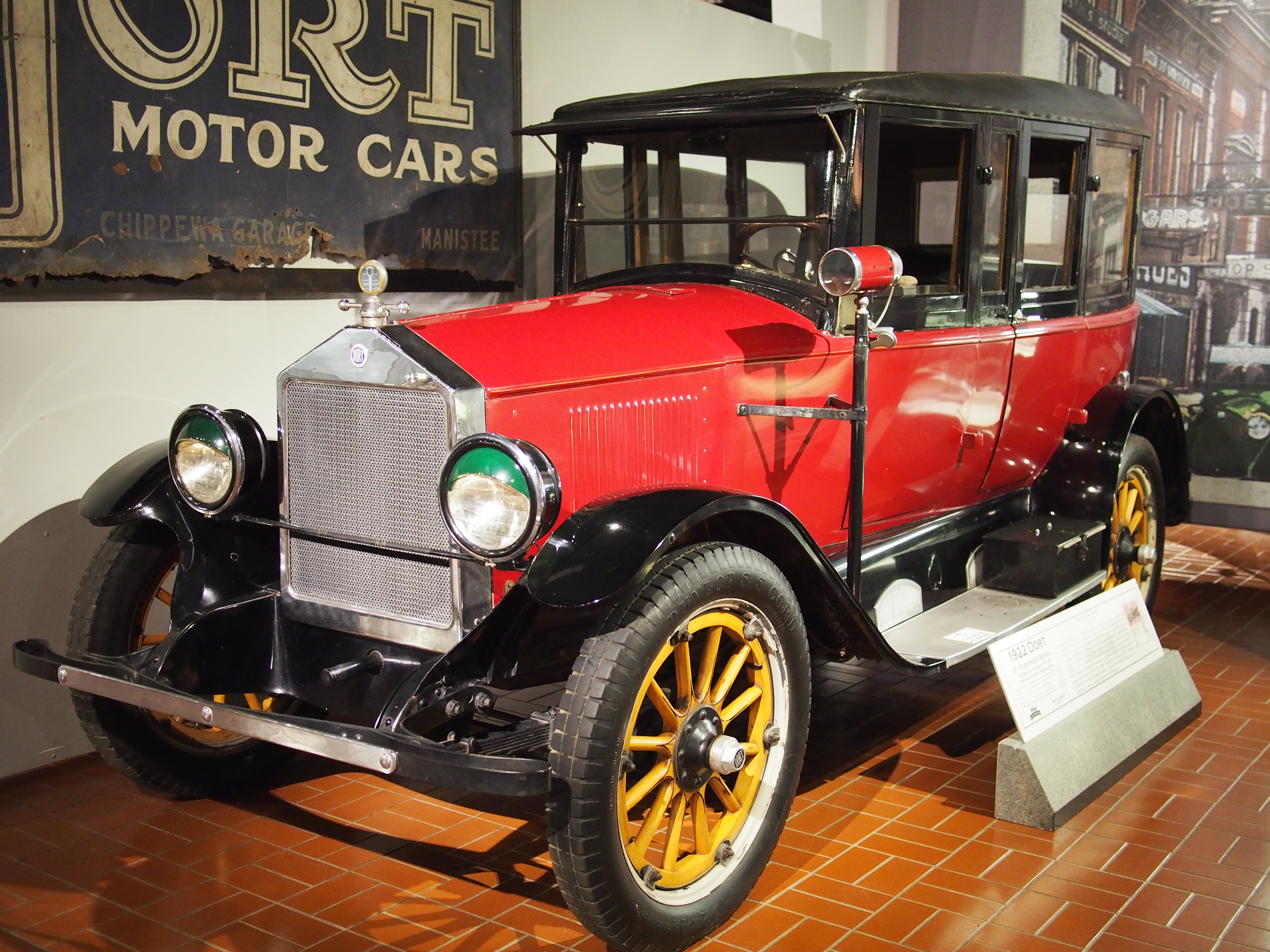
1922 Dort sedan, showing design features derived from a Rolls-Royce model, in the Gilmore Car Museum in Hickory Corners, Michigan

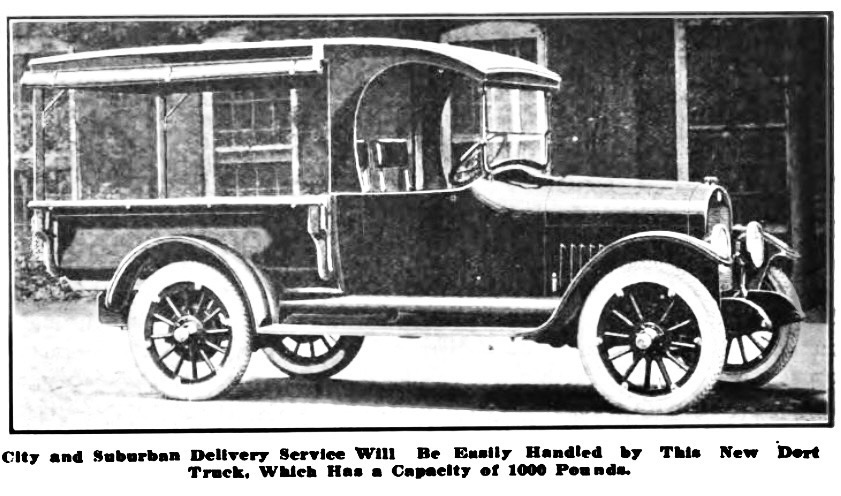
Dort Model 103,105,107 (1921-1924) 0,5 to

The Dort Motor Car Company of Flint, Michigan, built automobiles from 1915 to 1924. The company was founded by Josiah Dallas Dort as a spinoff from the Durant-Dort Carriage Company, and produced vehicles at Durant-Dort Factory One until its dissolution.

== History ==
In 1886, William Crapo "Billy" Durant and Josiah Dallas ("Dallas") Dort, as equal partners, established the Flint Road-Cart Company, later named the Durant-Dort Carriage Company. By 1900 it was the largest manufacturer of horse-drawn vehicles in the United States. In 1914, Durant sold out of the business and departed, amicably, to pursue his existing interests in General Motors. Dallas Dort and the remaining stockholders took over the carriage business, incorporated the Dort Motor Car Company, and used some of the same plant to manufacture Dort cars. (Note: The Durant-Dort Carriage Company stopped manufacturing carriages in 1917 and was dissolved in 1924.)

Dort's chief engineer, the Swiss mechanic Louis Chevrolet, together with noted French designer Étienne Planche, designed the company's product. Two models were launched in 1915 and 1916: both touring cars (i.e., open cars without a fixed roof) with a 4-cylinder, 17-horsepower (12.7-kilowatt) Lycombe engine. They quickly acquired a reputation for being reliable. Demand became so strong – 9,000 cars in its first year – that the company opened an extra factory 60 miles (100 kilometres) to the south of Flint, adjacent to Detroit at Windsor, in the Canadian province of Ontario. Robert Gray, the president of a Chatham, Ontario carriage builder obtained the Canadian rights to build Dort cars in 1915 and formed Gray-Dort Motors there.

In 1917, three more models were introduced: the Cloverleaf roadster (Note: At the time, the United States Society of Automobile Engineers defined a roadster as "an open car seating two or three. It may have additional seats on running boards or in rear deck.") and two sedan (closed-in) models.

Dort's cars came at a premium: whereas Ford Model T cars were selling for $440 in 1915, the Dort sedan sold in 1917 at $1,065; the convertible sedan at $815; the five-place open tourer at $695, and the roadster at $695.

A coupé followed in 1918. In the company's peak year, 1920, production was 30,000 cars. Subsequently, more luxurious models, including the Harvard and Yale, were introduced with design features derived from a Rolls-Royce model, and a six-cylinder car was produced in 1923.

Dort had become the country's 13th largest automobile producer by 1920. The company built a new large factory on the east end of Flint; however, the post-World War I recession took hold at the same time. The company started bleeding cash and attempted to seek capital or a merger partner, neither of which eventuated; staff numbers were cut and expenses were curtailed. By 1924, J. Dallas Dort was ready to retire, and liquidated the company. The new factory building was sold to AC Spark Plug to manufacture carburetor air filters and fuel pumps.

== Gallery ==
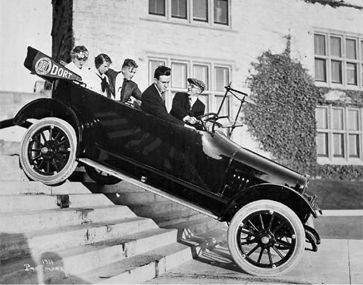
A 1918 Dort demonstrates its durability

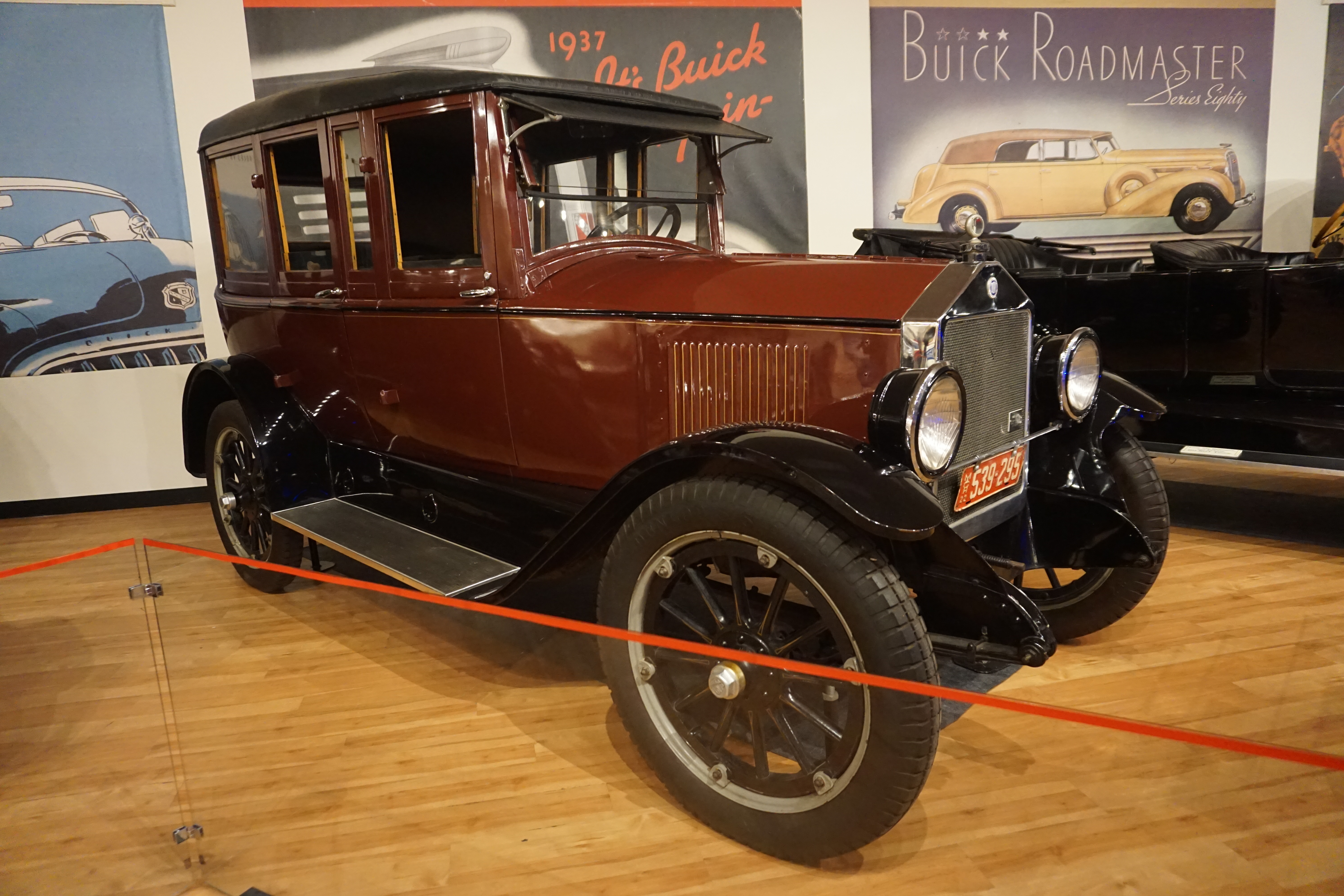
1922 Dort Model 19-T at the Sloan Museum in Flint, Michigan

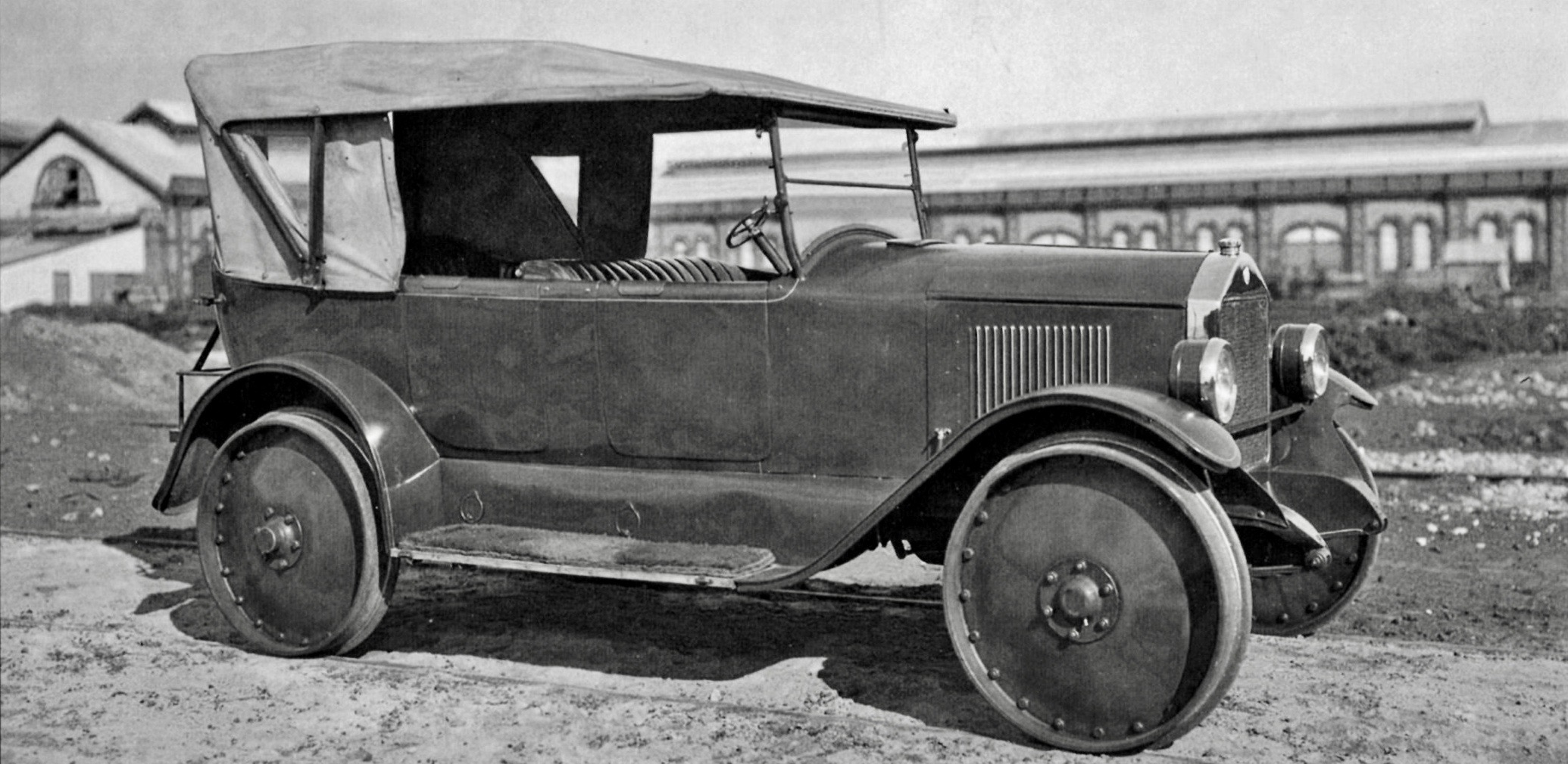
Eleven Dort tourers were exported to be motor inspection cars on the South Australian Railways

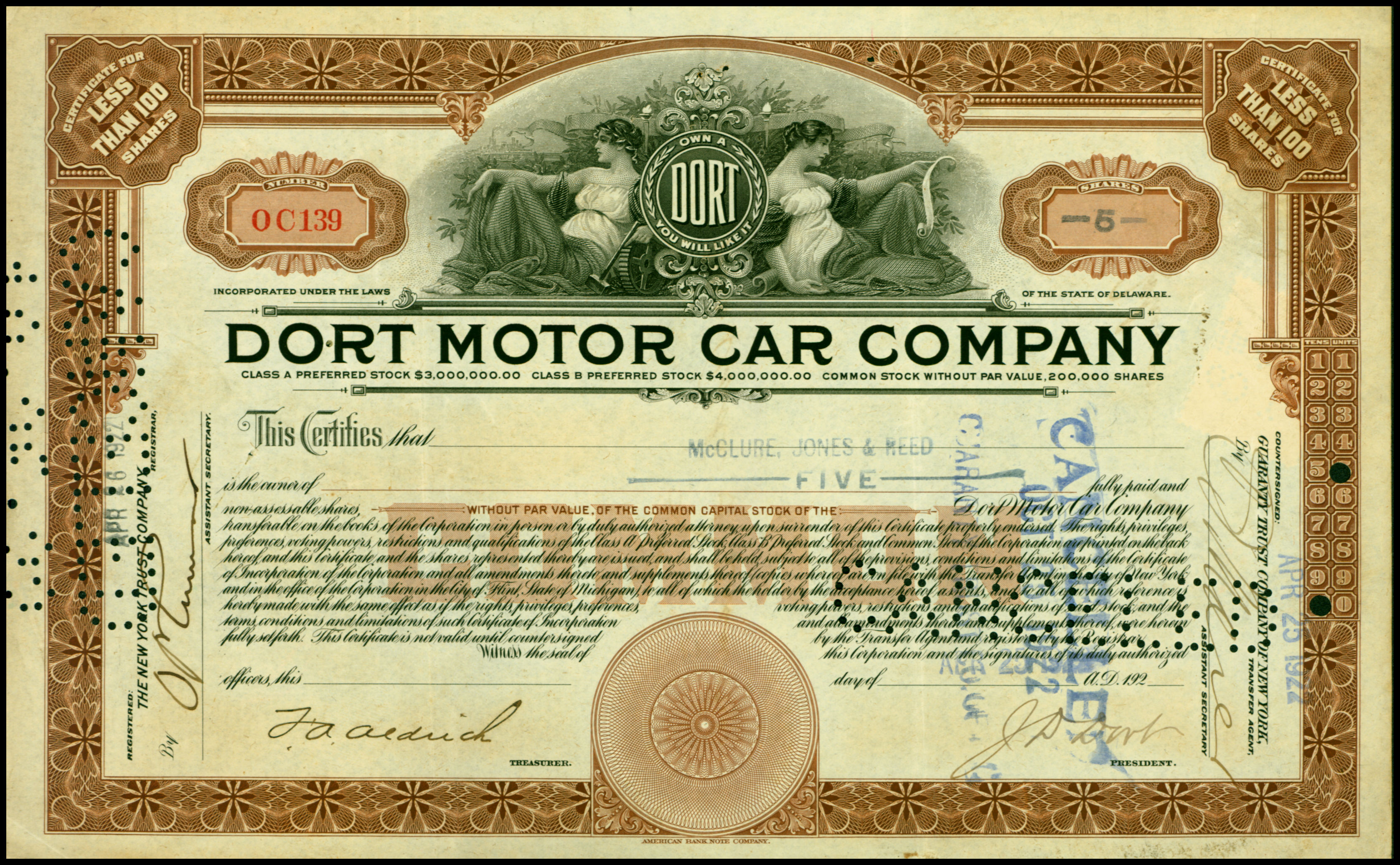
Certificate for shares in the Dort Motor Car Company

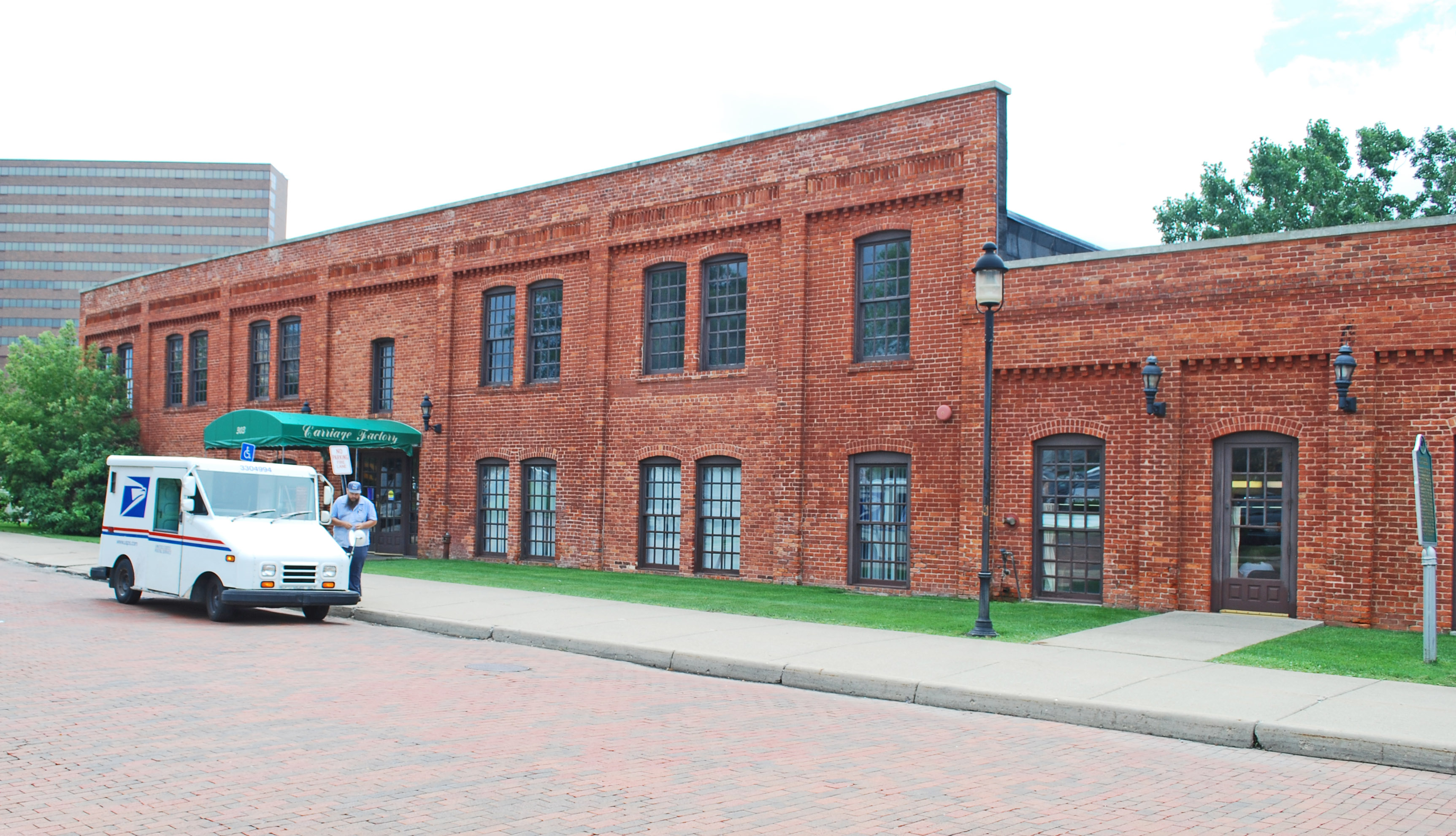
The Water Street factory inherited from Durant-Dort

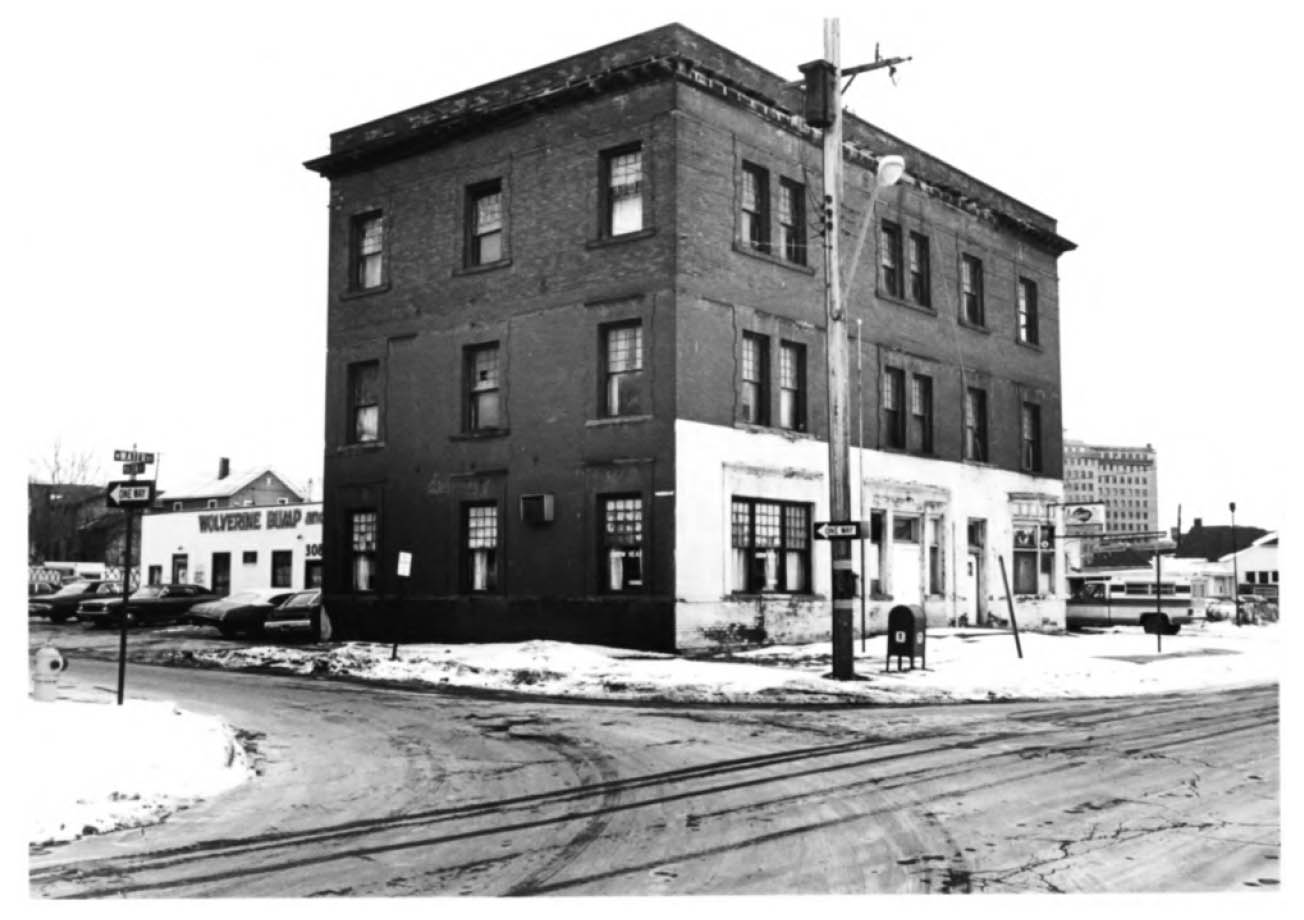
Water Street offices and showroom in 1977 before restoration

== See also ==
- Gray-Dort Motors Ltd.
