= William C. Durant =

American automotive businessman (1861–1947)

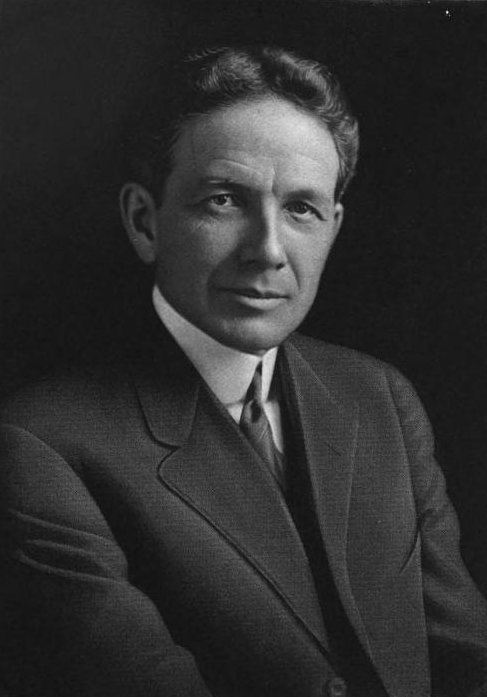
- Portrait of Durant (c. 1916)
- Born: William Crapo Durant; December 8, 1861; Boston, Massachusetts, U.S.
- Died: March 18, 1947 (aged 85); New York City, U.S.
- Occupation: Businessman
- Known for: Founder of General Motors and co-founder of Chevrolet
- Spouses: Clara Miller Pitt (divorced): Catherine Lederer (1886–1974)
- Children: Margery Pitt Durant (1887–1969); Russell Clifford Durant (1890–1937)

William Crapo Durant (December 8, 1861 – March 18, 1947) was an American businessman. A leading pioneer of the United States automobile industry, he was the founder of General Motors and a co-founder of Chevrolet. He created a system in which a company held multiple brands – each seemingly independent, with different automobile lines – bound under a unified corporate holding company. He also founded Frigidaire.

== Biography ==
Durant was born in Boston, Massachusetts, on December 8, 1861. He was the second child of William Clark Durant and Rebecca Folger Durant (née Crapo), who was born to a wealthy Massachusetts family of French descent. His mother, Rebecca, was the daughter of Michigan governor Henry H. Crapo, who was also of French descent. Durant's family moved to Flint, Michigan after his father abandoned the family in 1869. They lived with Rebecca's sister, Rhoda, and her husband James Wilson. William dropped out of high school to work in his grandfather's lumberyard. He started out as a cigar salesman in and eventually founded his own carriage company.

In 1886, Durant partnered with Josiah Dallas Dort and founded Flint Road Cart Company, eventually transforming $2,000 ($72,000 in 2025 dollars) in start-up capital into a $2-million company with worldwide sales ($72,000,000 in 2025 dollars). By 1890, the Durant-Dort Carriage Company, based in Flint, had become a leading manufacturer of horse-drawn vehicles and by the start of the 20th century, was the largest in the US.

Durant was highly skeptical of automobiles, feeling that the bad smell of burnt fuel, along with the engines' loud sounds, made them inherently dangerous to the point where he would not let his daughter ride in one. By 1900, public outcry over weak government regulation of gasoline-powered horseless carriages was significant. Durant noticed the general public's anger at this situation, and rather than relying on government regulations to improve their safety, he saw it as an opportunity to create a company which could improve the safety of this new class of transportation.

To begin this massive endeavor, Durant first set out to purchase Buick, then a local car company with few sales and large debts.

Durant conceived the modern system of automobile dealer franchises.

== Buick ==
From his holdings in Durant-Dort Carriage Company, Durant was a millionaire. On November 1, 1904, he assumed control of the troubled Buick Motor Company and used the financial and manufacturing resources of Durant-Dort to correct Buick's course. With Durant pushing and marketing the Buick name, the company was able to become the best-selling automobile in America, outperforming earlier leaders Ford Motor Company, Cadillac, and Oldsmobile, and despite having no manufacturing line and only a few extant cars, orders tallied over 1100—all of this by the time of the 1905 New York Automobile Show. Durant and Samuel McLaughlin (McLaughlin's being the largest carriage manufacturer in Canada) signed a 15-year contract to build Buick power trains at cost-plus pricing.

== General Motors ==
With Buick as a base, Durant envisioned creating a large automobile company that would manufacture several makes and control subsidiary component-making companies, much as Durant-Dort had done in the carriage-making world. Durant founded General Motors Holding Company on September 16, 1908, and exchanged a large parcel of Buick stock for a matching parcel of McLaughlin stock, making McLaughlin one of General Motors' biggest shareholders. On November 12, 1908, Durant purchased Olds Motor Works (Oldsmobile).

Durant consolidated 13 car companies and 10 parts-and-accessories manufacturers under the new holding company's control in 1908. In 1909, Durant's GM bought Cadillac, and Oakland Motor Car (eventually replaced by Pontiac), along with many parts-manufacturing companies, paint and varnish companies, and other accessory manufacturers owned by General Motors. By 1910, the rapid-fire acquisitions Durant made caught up with the business, which caused Durant and the corporation to become grossly overextended with so many imprudent acquisitions. The corporation faced a cash shortage, and in the aftermath, Durant was forced out of the company.

But Durant would not be bowed, and he backed Louis Chevrolet's eponymous company in 1911, with J. Dallas Dort as the vice-president and director of the company. In 1913, Dort stepped down as vice-president of Chevrolet, and in 1914 Durant disposed of his share of the Durant-Dort Carriage Company. By 1916, Durant had leveraged Chevrolet's sales to regain control of General Motors, and he went on to lead GM until 1920.

=== Other acquisitions ===
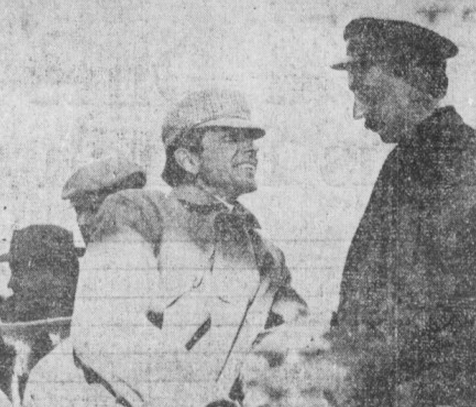
Durant, center, chatting with President Hinz of the Lowell, Massachusetts, Automobile Club in 1909

On October 26, 1909, General Motors Holding acquired the Cartercar Company, founded four years earlier in Jackson, Michigan, by Byron J. Carter. In explaining the reason he purchased Cartercar, Durant said:

"They say I shouldn't have bought Cartercar. Well, how was anyone to know that Carter wasn't to be the thing? It had the friction drive and no other car had it. How could I tell what these engineers would say next?" By the time Durant had regained control of General Motors in 1916, the GM board had already decided to discontinue the Cartercar, largely because sales never approached the 1000-2000 annually that Durant had predicted. The GM board decided to use the factory instead to produce the Oakland.

Durant had arranged an $8 million deal to buy Ford in 1909, but the bankers turned him down and the board of directors of General Motors dismissed him.

Both Durant and rival Henry Ford foresaw the automobile becoming a mass-market item. Ford followed the course of the basic Model T, and had said "Any customer can have a car painted any color that he wants so long as it is black." Durant, however, drawing on his experience in the carriage business, sought to create automobiles targeted to various incomes and tastes. This brought about his plans to merge Buick with various other companies for this purpose.

=== Chevrolet ===
When Durant became financially overextended and banking interests assumed control, forcing him out of GM Holding, in 1910, he immediately set out to create "another GM", starting with the Little car, named after its founder, William H. Little. His initial intention was to compete with the Ford Model T, which was beginning the start of its impending popularity. Unsatisfied with this approach, he dropped it. In Canada, on 30 September 1910, after obtaining a loan of $52,935.25 ($1,830,000 in 2025 dollars) (cosigned by R S McLaughlin), Durant went into partnership with Louis Chevrolet in 1911, starting the Chevrolet company. In 1914, a disagreement with Louis Chevrolet resulted in Durant buying out his partner. Durant went to McLaughlin in 1915 to put Chevrolet in Canada and with the shares being bought up at 5-to-1 and 7-to-1, McLaughlin and Durant with other shareholders had enough stock to reclaim Durant's old job. McLaughlin had no problem with his friend back at the helm; he went on building Chevrolet and built his Buicks in Canada without conflict with his Buick contract. General Motors Corporation was started at this time with Durant putting Pierre du Pont in charge, with McLaughlin Director and Vice President of the newly incorporated General Motors Corporation in 1918.

The venture proved highly successful for Durant, and he was able to buy enough shares in GM to regain control, becoming its president in 1916. During his presidency (1916–1920), Durant brought the Chevrolet product line into the corporation (1919), as well as Fisher Body and Frigidaire. In 1920, he finally lost control of GM to the DuPont and McLaughlin shareholders, paying out $21,000,000 ($338,000,000 in 2025 dollars) back to his friends.

Following the US entry into World War I in 1917, Durant, who detested war, declared that GM would not participate in defense work. He ran afoul of Cadillac founder Henry Leland, who was an ardent patriot and eager to assist in the US war effort. Leland left GM and founded the Lincoln Motor Company, which received contracts to build Liberty aircraft engines.

While in charge of Chevrolet, Durant created other companies, including Republic Motors, mainly to produce Chevrolet.

He was inducted into the Automotive Hall of Fame in 1968.

=== Vertical integration ===
Drawing on experience gleaned in the carriage-making business 20 years earlier, Durant assembled a collection of parts and components manufacturers (Hyatt Roller Bearing, New Departure Manufacturing, Dayton Engineering Laboratories (later Delco Electronics Corporation), Harrison Radiator Corporation, Remy Electric, Jaxon Steel Products, and Perlman Rim) into a new company; United Motors Company, making Alfred P. Sloan of Hyatt Roller Bearing Company the president. In 1918, United Motors was sold to General Motors for $44,065,000 ($9.4 billion in 2025 dollars). Sloan rose to president of GM in the 1920s, going on to build the company into the world's largest automaker.

=== Durant Motors ===
In 1921, Durant established a new company, Durant Motors, initially with one brand. Within two years, it had several marques (including the Durant, Star (also called Rugby), Flint, and Eagle), rivalling the range offered by General Motors. Part of the new empire included a factory in Leaside, Ontario, for Canadian production.

As he had with General Motors, Durant acquired a range of companies whose cars were aimed at different markets, and therefore, levels of affordability and luxury. The lowest ('entry' tier) was the Star, aimed at the person who would otherwise buy the Ford Model T. Durant cars were mid-market, and the company's entire structure was purposefully very similar to GM; the Princeton line (designed, prototyped, and marketed but never produced) competed with Packard and Cadillac, the ultra-luxurious Locomobile being top of the line. Durant was unable to duplicate his former success, and the financial woes of the Wall Street Crash of 1929 and the ensuing Great Depression ultimately proved to be insurmountable, and the company failed in 1933.

== Wall Street and later years ==
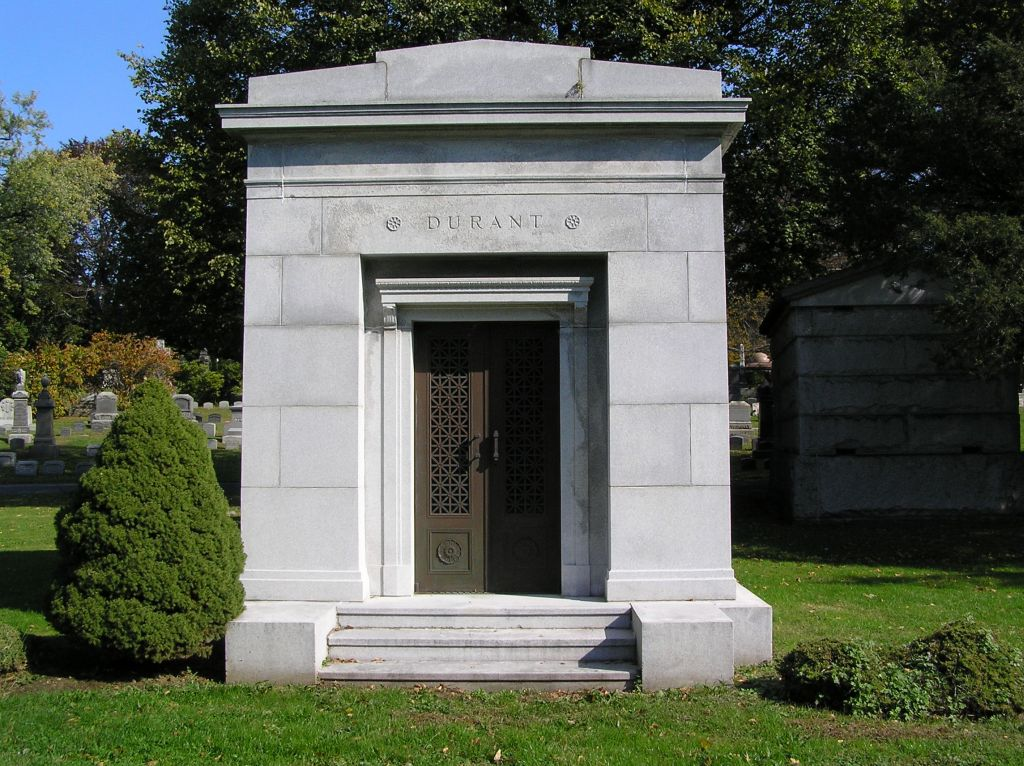
The mausoleum of William C. Durant

In the 1920s, Durant became a major "player" on Wall Street and on Black Tuesday joined with members of the Rockefeller family and other financial giants to buy large quantities of stocks, against the advice of friends, to demonstrate to the public their confidence in the stock market. His effort proved costly and failed to stop the market slide. By 1936, Durant was bankrupt.

After the fall of Durant Motors, Durant and his second wife, Catherine Lederer Durant, lived on a pension provided by R. S. McLaughlin, and Messrs. Marr and Dupont as arranged by Alfred P. Sloan at $10,000.00 ($230,000 in 2025 dollars) a year on behalf of General Motors. He then opened a bowling alley/fast food restaurant in Flint, Michigan, working the kitchen in person. Durant predicted that family-friendly entertainment venues would be big business in the coming years and he hoped to expand to a chain of 30 bowling alleys. In 1942, Durant traveled to Goldfield, Nevada, to open up a cinnabar mine, hoping the US government would subsidize it through defense contracts, although this ultimately proved a pipe dream. The 80 year old Durant made an exhausting climb on foot to the mine entrance to inspect it and after returning to Flint a few days later, he suffered a stroke that left him partially paralyzed. He was forced to move with his wife to an apartment in New York City, where he spent his remaining days. At the end of WWII, Durant predicted an economic boom and that the possibilities for consumer goods were almost limitless. The final moneymaking scheme he backed before his death was a hair tonic venture. Although Durant's mental faculties were unimpaired to the end and he attempted to work on his memoirs, complications from the stroke gradually robbed him of his ability to speak coherently. He attempted to travel back to Flint in 1946, but his health had deteriorated to the point where this was impossible. He became comatose on March 13, 1947, and died a few days later. By the time of his death, the Durants were bankrupt and had to sell off most of their collection of paintings and other valuables to pay for his medical expenses. He was interred in a private mausoleum in Woodlawn Cemetery in The Bronx, New York City. He was inducted into the Junior Achievement U.S. Business Hall of Fame in 1996.

Durant Park in Lansing, Michigan, is named after him, as is Waterford Durant High School in Waterford, Michigan. Likewise, Durant Square in Deal, New Jersey, where he maintained a summer home, is named after him.

== Durant's Castle ==
During the late 1920s, Durant's son, Russell Clifford (Cliff) Durant and his third wife, Lea Gapsky Durant, started construction on a personal castle and private airstrip in Roscommon, Michigan, along the south branch of the Au Sable River. The 54-room mansion burned to the ground under mysterious circumstances on February 6, 1931. The Durants never inhabited it. Arson was suspected, allegedly at the hands of trade unionists, whom Durant had refused to recognize.

After Lea's mysterious disappearance in 1934, and Cliff's death in 1937, Cliff's fourth wife, Charlotte Phillips Durant, sold the land to George W. Mason (of Nash Motors), an automotive executive. Upon his death, it was bequeathed to the State of Michigan as a nature preserve, the Mason Tract, which covers a portion of the Au Sable State Forest. All that remains of the castle and private airstrip are the old foundation works. Today, a canoe landing and a short history of the castle are on the site.

Business positions
Preceded by Charles W. Nash	President of General Motors; 1916–1920	Succeeded by Pierre S. du Pont
