= Automotive industry in Canada =

The automotive industry in Canada consists primarily of assembly plants of foreign automakers, most with headquarters in the United States or Japan, along with hundreds of manufacturers of automotive parts and systems.

Canada is currently the thirteenth-largest auto-producing nation in the world, and seventh largest auto exporter by value, producing 1.4 million vehicles and exporting $32 billion worth of vehicles in 2020. Canada's highest rankings ever were the second-largest producer in the world between 1918 and 1923 and third-largest after World War II.

Automotive manufacturing is one of Canada's largest industrial sectors, accounting for 10% of manufacturing GDP and 23% of manufacturing trade. Canada produces passenger vehicles, trucks and buses, auto parts and systems, truck bodies and trailers, as well as tires and machine, tools, dies and molds (MTDM). The auto industry directly employs more than 125,000 people in vehicle assembly and auto parts manufacturing, and another 380,000 in distribution and aftermarket sales and service.

== History ==
The oldest surviving vehicle manufactured in Canada was the Redpath Messenger built in 1903. It had a wooden carriage body using a one-cylinder engine with shaft drive and two speed transmission. It was the first vehicle in automotive history with a tilt steering wheel. It weighed approximately 650 pounds and sold for between $600 and $700 with a top speed of 10 miles per hour. There is only one model known to exist, currently on display at the Canadian Automotive Museum.

The first large-scale production of automobiles in Canada took place in Walkerville, Ontario, near Windsor, in 1904. In the first year of operations, Gordon McGregor and Wallace Campbell, along with a handful of workmen, produced 117 Ford Model Cs at the Walkerville Wagon Works factory.

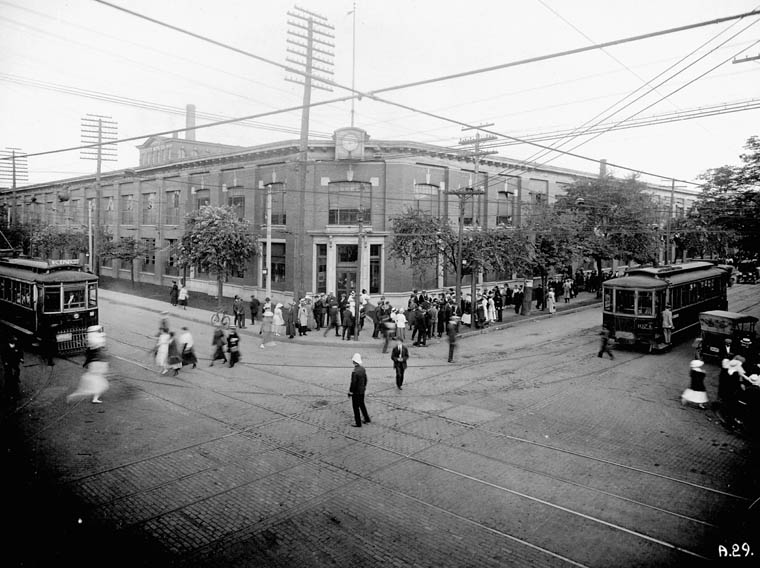
Russell Motor Car Company plant in Toronto in 1917

Through marques such as Brooks, Redpath, Tudhope, McKay (Nova Scotia Carriage and Motor Car Company), Gray-Dort, Chatham, Anhunt, Russell (CCM), Hyslop and Ronald, and McLaughlin, Canada had many domestic auto brands. In 1918, McLaughlin was bought by an American firm, General Motors, and was rebranded General Motors of Canada. In the 1930s, Studebaker built its Rockne in Canada.

Driven by the demands of World War I, Canada's automotive industry had grown, by 1923, into the second-largest in the world, although it was still made up of relatively inefficient plants producing many models behind a high tariff wall. High consumer prices and production inefficiencies characterized the Canadian auto industry prior to the signing of the Canada–United States Automotive Products Agreement.

The 1965 Automotive Products Trade Agreement or "Auto Pact" represents the single most important factor in making the Canadian automotive industry what it is today. Key features of the Auto Pact were the 1:1 production-to-sales ratio and Canadian Value Added requirements. As of 2015, major car companies that operate are Fiat-Chrysler, Ford, General Motors, Honda, and Toyota.

Among the 17 vehicles assembled in Canada, excluding assembly costs, the amount of Canadian parts content in the average vehicle assembled in Canada was $4,105 in 2016 or 17.2% of the overall parts content, according to a study by DesRosiers. The number has fluctuated between 25.6% and as low as 13% in recent years. Another estimated that the overall Canadian content figure is between 20% and 24%. Canadian content at plants run by Honda and Toyota, would likely be higher because they do more in-house manufacturing of parts, such as plastic-injection-molded components, than the Canadian plants operated by the Detroit Three.

== Electric vehicles ==
As the world moves towards electric vehicles, the Canadian automotive industry follows. Letenda, a Quebec electric bus manufacturer, has announced the Electrip bus, their 30-foot, zero emission bus.

== Canadian automotive companies ==
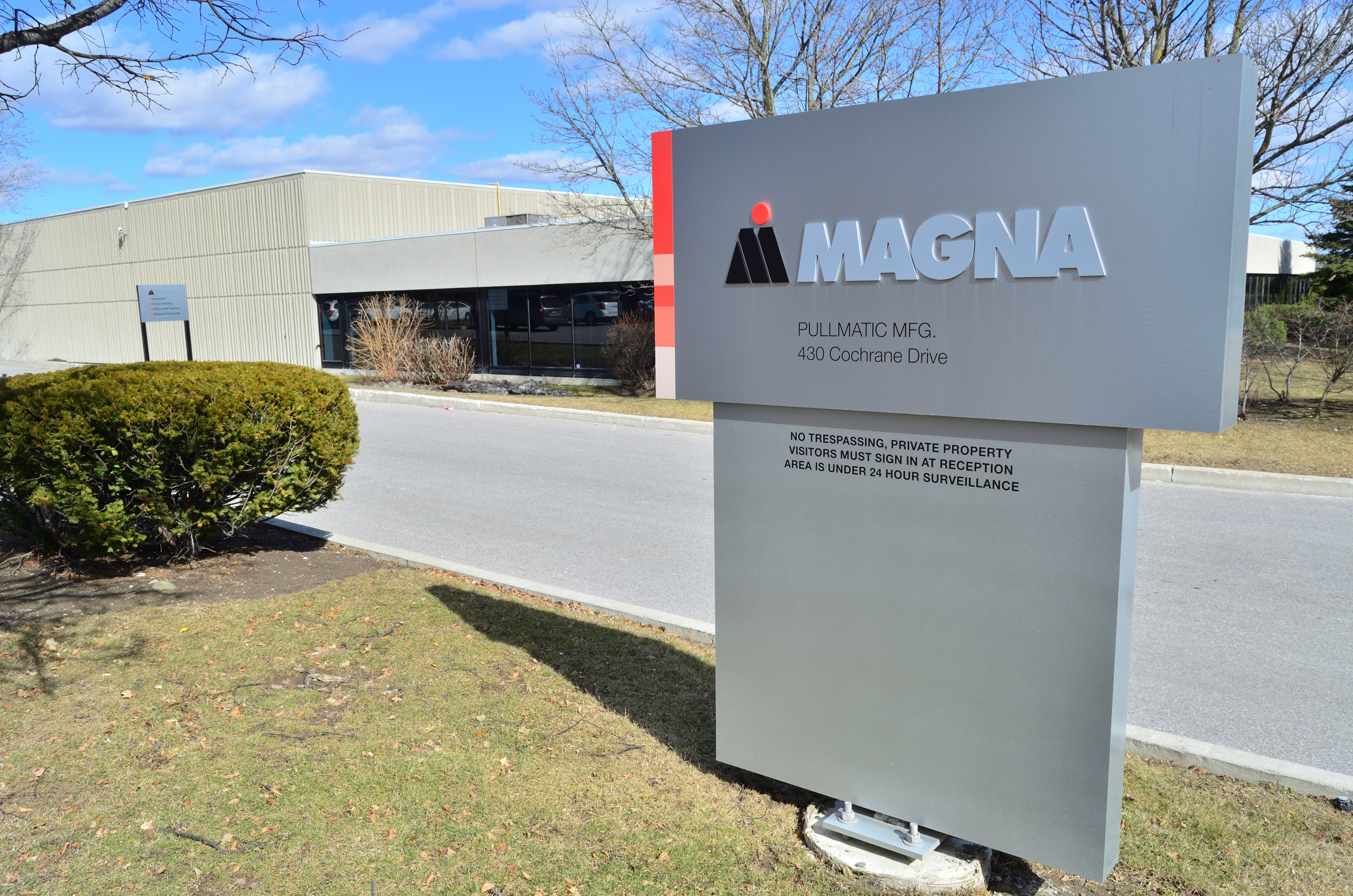
Entrance to the headquarters of Magna International, the largest automobile parts manufacturer in North America

The following list includes Canadian-based manufacturers of automobiles, as well as automotive parts and components.

- Canadian Electric Vehicles
- Felino Corporation
- Intermeccanica
- INKAS
- Linamar
- Lion Electric Company
- Magna International
- Magnum Cars
- Martinrea International
- Multimatic
- New Flyer
- Nova Bus
- Prevost Car
- Raeda Dynamics
- Terradyne Armored Vehicles

=== Defunct automakers and brands ===
- Acadian (General Motors)
- Allard Motor Works
- American Motors Canada
- Automobiles Manic
- Bricklin
- Brooks Steam Motors
- Derby (Canadian automobile)
- Dupont Industries
- Dynasty Electric Car Corporation
- Gray-Dort Motors
- HTT Automobile
- Laurentian (Pontiac)
- Nova Scotia Carriage and Motor Car Company
- McLaughlin Automobile
- Meteor (Ford)
- Orion International
- Redpath Motor Vehicle Company
- Russell Motor Car Company
- Studebaker Canada
- Suzuki Canada Inc.
- Tudhope Carriage Company
- ZENN Motor Company

== Foreign automakers in Canada ==
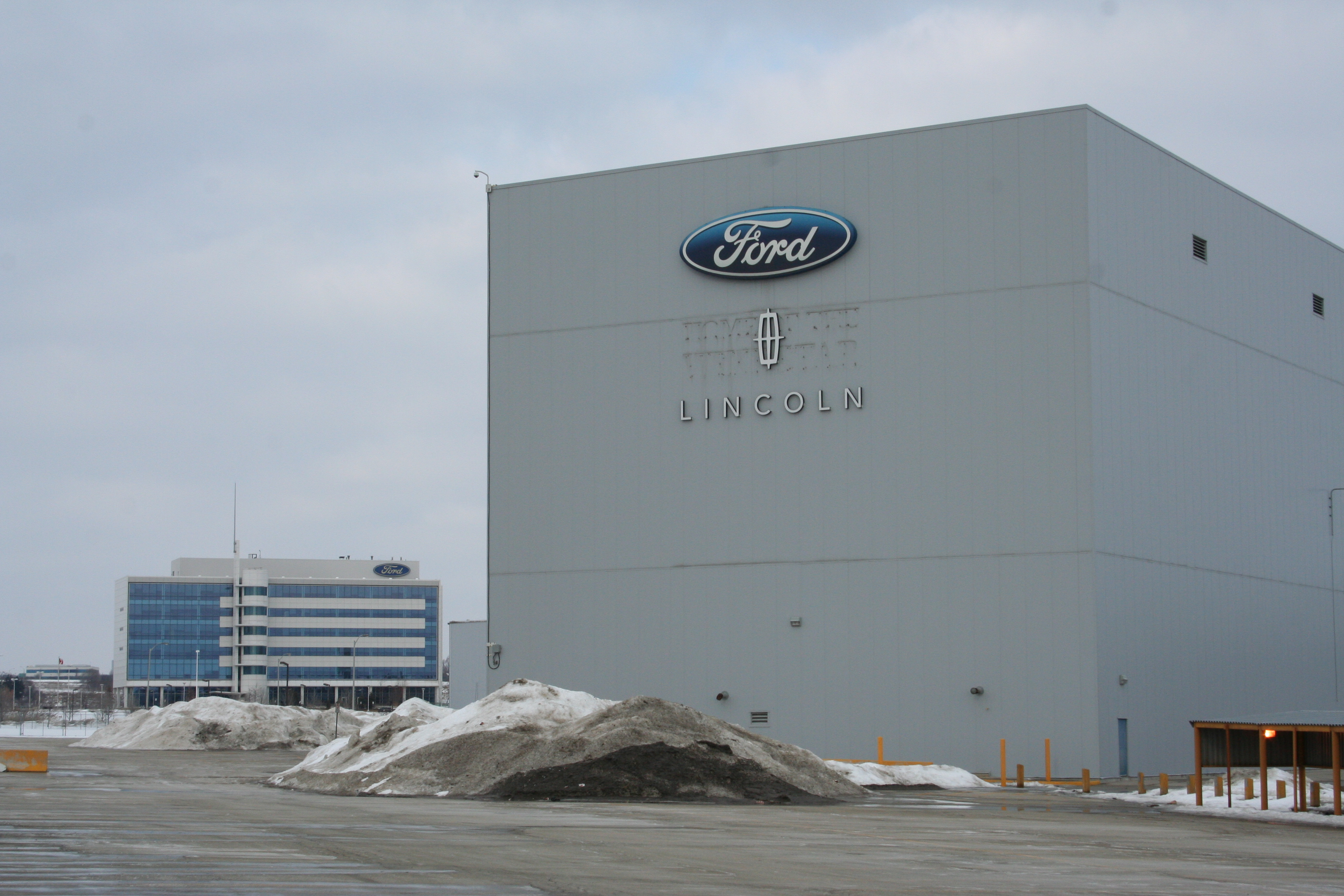
Ford Motor Company of Canada's Oakville Assembly complex in Oakville, Ontario

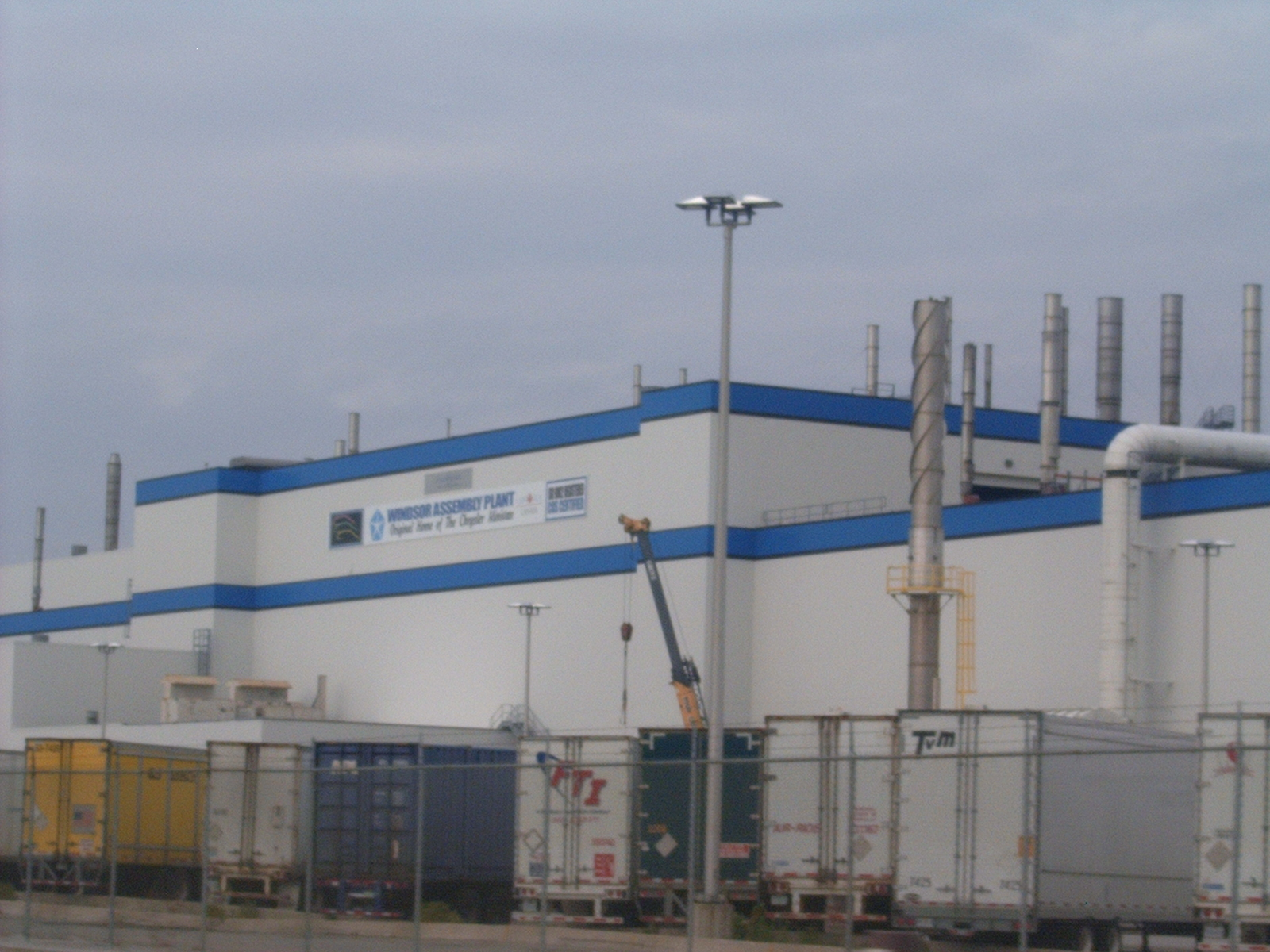
Stellantis Canada's Windsor Assembly complex in Windsor, Ontario

As of 2017, there are 5 foreign automakers that operate manufacturing facilities in Canada and a Canadian subsidiary. The headquarters of these Canadian subsidiaries are all based in Ontario, as well as their manufacturing facilities.

The following foreign automakers with manufacturing facilities in Canada include:

Parent company	Canadian subsidiary	Active manufacturing facilities in Canada
Ford Motor Company	Ford Motor Company of Canada	Essex Engine Plant (1981–2007; 2009–present); Oakville Assembly (1953–present); Windsor Engine Plant (1978–present)
General Motors	General Motors Canada	CAMI Assembly (1989–present); Oshawa Car Assembly (1907–present); St. Catharines Engine Plant (1954–present)
Honda	Honda Canada Inc.	Honda of Canada Manufacturing (1986–present)
Stellantis	Stellantis Canada	Brampton Assembly (1985–present); Windsor Assembly (1928–present); Etobicoke Casting Plant (1942–present; acquired in 1964)
Toyota	Toyota Canada Inc.	Toyota Motor Manufacturing Canada Cambridge plant (1988–present) and Woodstock plant (2008–present)

In addition to the aforementioned foreign automakers, Hyundai, Suzuki and Volvo were 3 foreign automakers that formerly operated manufacturing facilities in Canada. In 1989, Hyundai Auto Canada Inc. opened a stamping and assembly plant in Bromont with body, paint and trim shops, as well as a pumping station for the plant, a paint residue treatment plant, and administrative offices. The Bromont plant was operational for 5 years before it closed in 1994. Suzuki initially operated CAMI Automotive assembly plant as a joint venture with General Motors of Canada, although Suzuki withdrew from the venture and ended production at the assembly in 2009. Volvo formerly operated the Volvo Halifax Assembly from 1963 to 1998.

== APMA ==
Canada's automotive parts manufacturing network is represented by APMA (Automotive Parts Manufacturer's Association). In November 2020, Prime Minister Justin Trudeau announced a goal of net-zero emissions by 2050. Toward that end, APMA launched a project to design and build a complete zero-emission concept car with all-Canadian parts and technology, dubbed Project Arrow, intended to highlight the industry's breadth of robust experience, technology and supply chain. The project received $5 million in federal funding from the federal government and $1.4M from the province of Quebec. The Arrow project name is an homage to the Avro Arrow fighter jet, discontinued in 1959.

== See also ==
- 2008–2010 automotive industry crisis
- Big Three (automobile manufacturers)
- Canada–United States Automotive Products Agreement
- Decentralization
- Effects of the 2008–2010 automotive industry crisis on Canada
- List of automobiles manufactured in Ontario
