= Manitoba Antique Automobile Museum =

Coordinates: 49.9725°N 101.2267°W

- Location: Trans Canada Highway 1 in Rural Municipality of Wallace, just outside Elkhorn, Manitoba, Canada
- Type: Automobile Museum

The Manitoba Antique Automobile Museum is a museum that is located on Trans Canada Highway 1 in Elkhorn, Manitoba. It has a collection of over 100 automobiles that date back. Ike Clarkson started collecting all of the autos.

== Collection ==
The museum also has a collection of pioneer farm equipment, steam tractors, and unique household artifacts. Included in the museum's collection are a 1904 Holsman, a 1909 Metz, a 1914 Briscoe and a 1918 Gray-Dort. The collection also includes lesser-known automobiles such as the Maxwell and the Russel-Knight.

== See also ==
- Canadian Automotive Museum

== Affiliations ==
The Museum is affiliated with: Association of Manitoba Museums (www.museumsmanitoba.com) CMA, CHIN, and Virtual Museum of Canada.
