= Penn (automobile) =

Defunct American motor vehicle manufacturer

Penn Motor Car Company
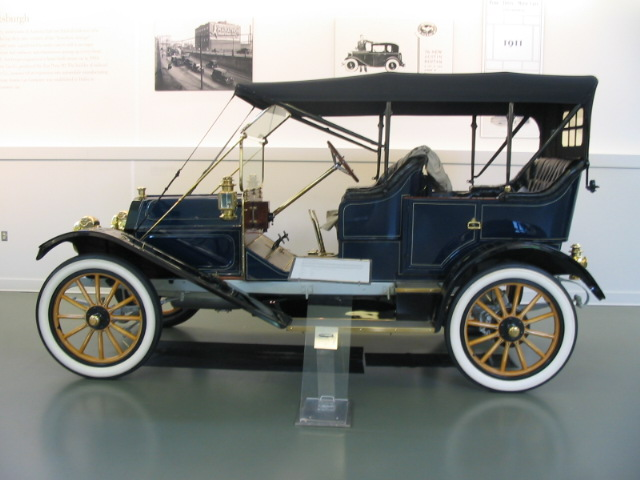
- 1911 Penn Model Thirty T-5 at the Frick Collection
- Type: Automobile manufacturer
- Industry: Automotive
- Founded: 1911; 115 years ago
- Defunct: 1912; 114 years ago
- Fate: Bankruptcy
- Headquarters: Pittsburgh, Pennsylvania, United States
- Key people: Elmore Gregg
- Products: Automobiles

Penn Motor Cars advertisement (1911)

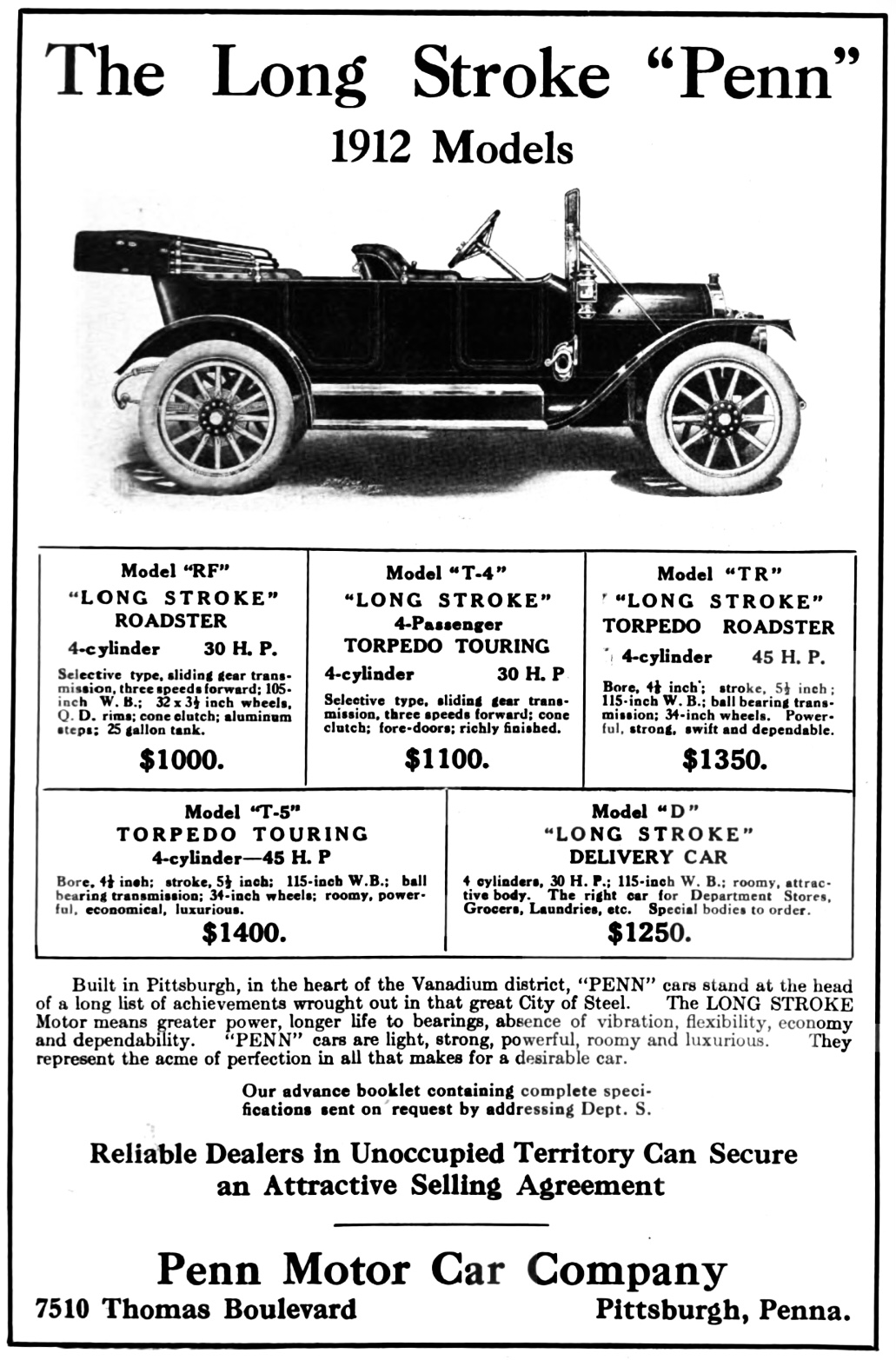
Penn Model RF, T-4, TR, T-5, D (1912)

Penn was the name of three American automobiles of the veteran era, but Penn Motor Car Company, located at 7510 Thomas Boulevard in Pittsburgh was the only one to enter production. The Penn brass era automobile was produced from 1911 to 1912.

== History ==
Penn Motor Car Company was established in November, 1910, with a capital stock of $150,000, and immediately started production. For 1911, one model was available, the Thirty. This was a 4-cylinder, 30-hp car with a wheelbase of 105 inches. Customers could choose from two body styles, the Model R 2-passenger Roadster, and the Model T 5-passenger Touring. Priced at $975, or $1075 (equivalent to $37,145 in 2025) respectively, they were remarkably competitive.

Following the industry's trend, 1912 Penn cars saw body improvements that incorporated doors for all body styles, including front doors for the touring. At $1,200, a new roadster called the Comet was the most expensive Thirty. The Model R-F Fore-Door Runabout for 2 passengers cost $1,000. The Model T-4 5-passenger Touring was listed at $1,100.

Completely new for 1912 was a 45-hp car, appropriately called the Forty-Five. Another 4-cylinder, this car had a wheelbase of 115 inches. Three body styles were available: The Model T-R Fore-Door Runabout for 2 passengers ($1,350), Model T-4 5-passenger Touring at $1,400), and another Comet roadster at $1,600 (equivalent to $53,379 in 2025). In a time when many 40 or 50-hp cars sold for prices in exceed of $3,000, these automobiles were bargains.

The McKay automobile of Nova Scotia was based on the Penn. The end of the marque came when Penn built a $90,000 factory in New Castle, Pennsylvania which was locally financed. As the backers withdrew immediately after completion, Penn went into bankruptcy. On January, 21st, 1913, the plant was sold at auction for $54,000. Not a single car was built in the new location.

== See also ==
- ConceptCarz - two 1911 Penn Thirtys
- Nova Scotia Carriage and Motor Car Company
