= George Foote Foss =

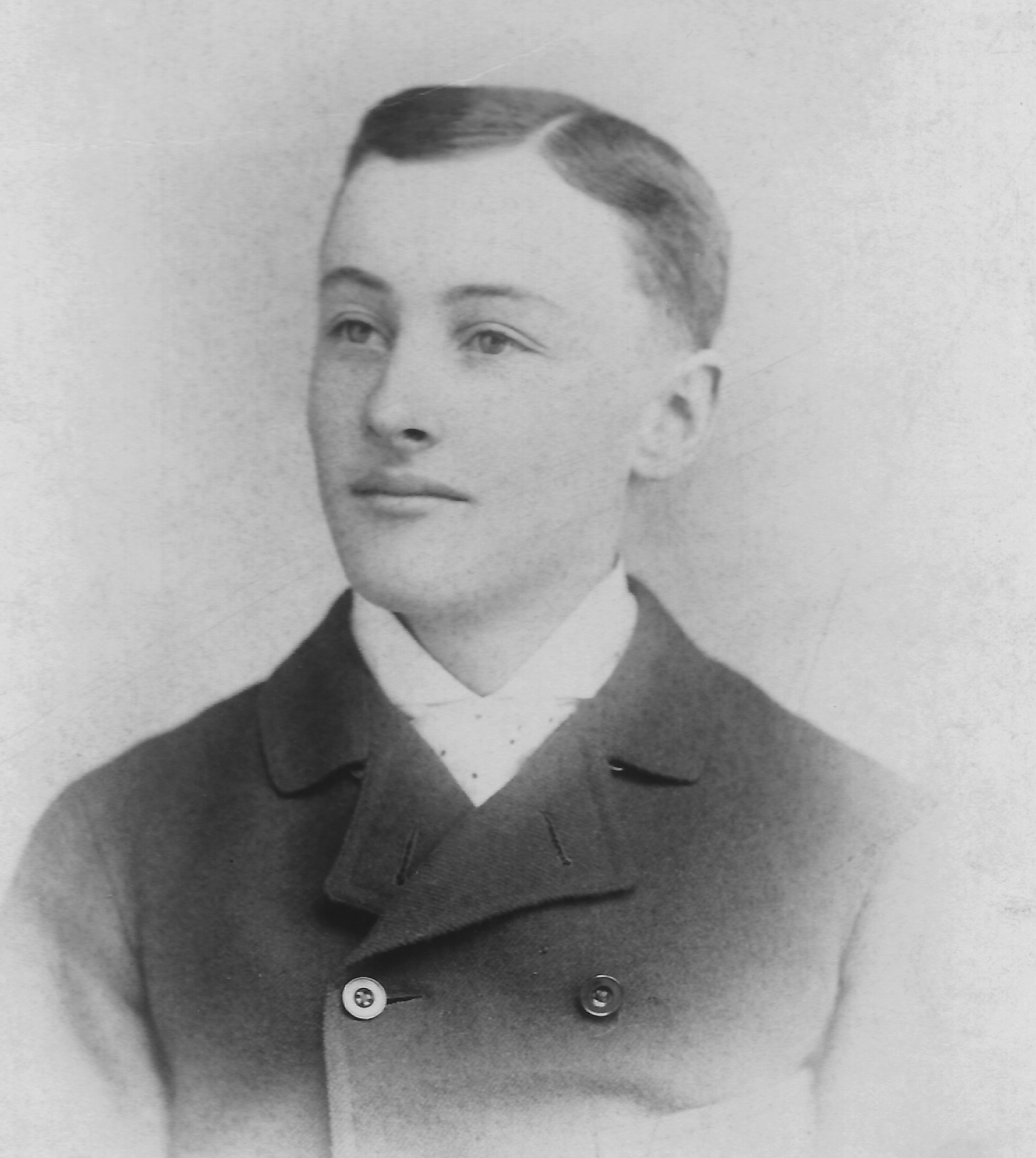
- Image of George Foote Foss from 1897.
- Born: September 30, 1876; Sherbrooke, Quebec, Canada
- Died: November 23, 1968 (aged 92); Châteauguay, Quebec, Canada
- Occupation: Machinist
- Known for: Fossmobile

George Foote Foss (September 30, 1876 – November 23, 1968) was a machinist, blacksmith, bicycle repairman and inventor from Sherbrooke, Quebec. He was the inventor of the Fossmobile, Canada's first successful gasoline-powered automobile which he manufactured in 1896.

== Early life ==
Foss was born in Sherbrooke, Quebec, in 1876 to Edwin Sherrill Foss and Ellen Sophia. His parents had emigrated from New England and initially farmed in Stanstead before moving to Sherbrooke, where his father became the city’s auction clerk. Foss was an entrepreneur at an early age. His first job was assisting his father on auction days by running up and down the streets of Sherbrooke, ringing a bell. At the age of twelve he was sweeping out the local Canadian post office, and by the age of fourteen, he was transferring bags of mail from the local post office to the Grand Trunk and Quebec Central Railways, often with the help of a draft horse harnessed to a sleigh or buggy.

== Career ==
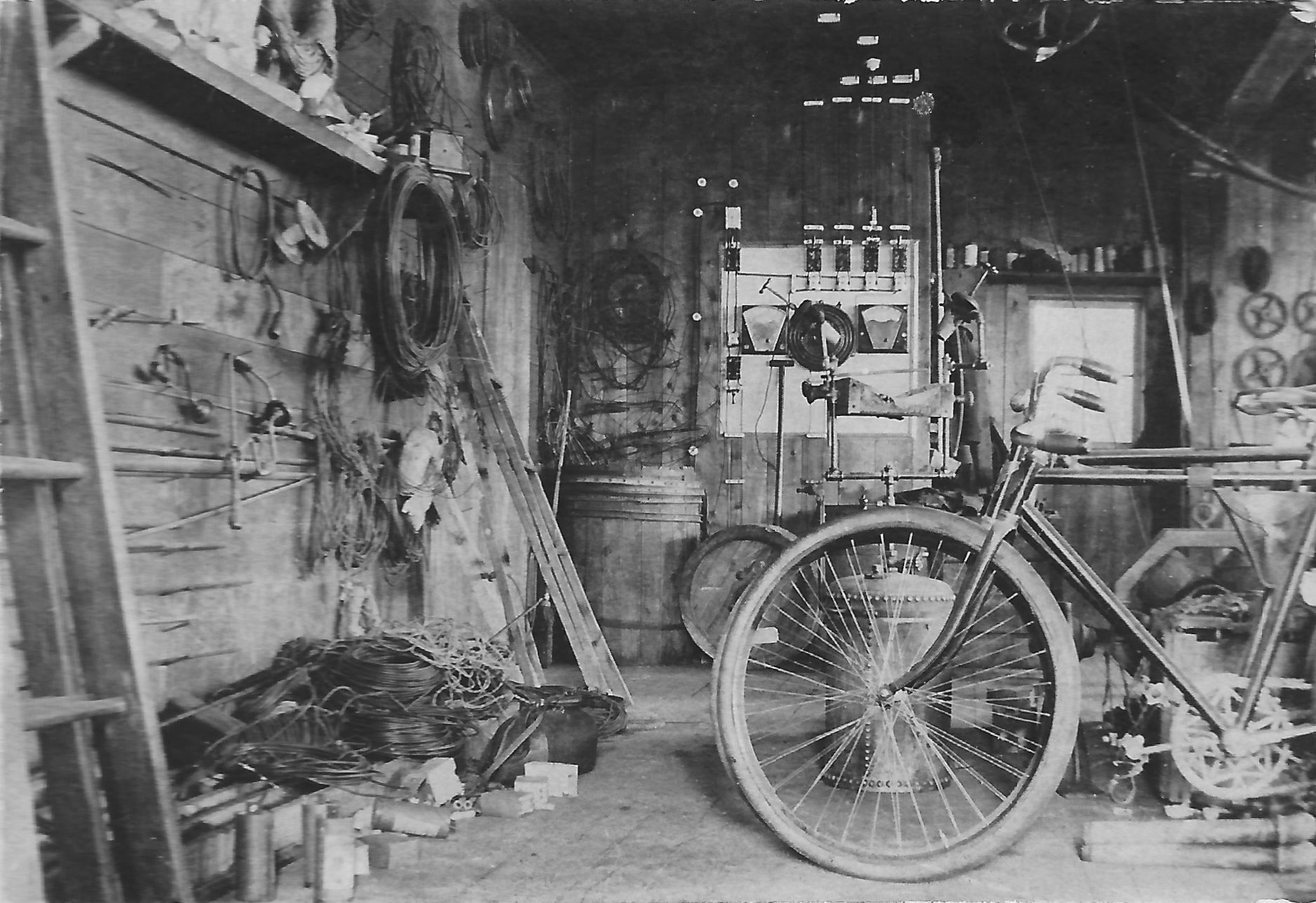
The inside of the bicycle and machine shop owned by George Foote Foss.

Foss obtained electrical expertise, while apprenticing with Whitney Electrical Instrument Company, where he learned to assemble electrical instruments and wind electrical motors. About two years later, he joined the Stanley Electric Company in Pittsfield, Massachusetts, where he furthered his electrical experience.

At 18, Foss returned to Sherbrooke and opened up his own shop, offering services in machining, blacksmithing, and bicycle repair. His first major project was to engineer a 52-volt boat motor which he mounted on top of the rudder with a bicycle chain running to the propeller. He designed and built thirty small storage batteries, which were stored under the seat. The motor was notably quiet and performed well for him, as he traversed the Magog and St Francis rivers.

In 1896, Foss traveled to Boston to purchase a turret lathe for his machine shop. He saw and rode in his first automobile there. It was an electrically driven brougham. However, after 30 minutes, the batteries in the car died. Upon returning to Sherbrooke, he began to design and build an automobile that would address the problem. He started with a chassis made of old bicycle frames. The Fossmobile's front mounted engine made maintenance easier and produced considerably less upward vibration felt through the seat. Additionally, the gear shifter for the Fossmobile was mounted directly on the tiller-style steering column. An innovation that wouldn't be adopted by other manufacturers for another 40 years.

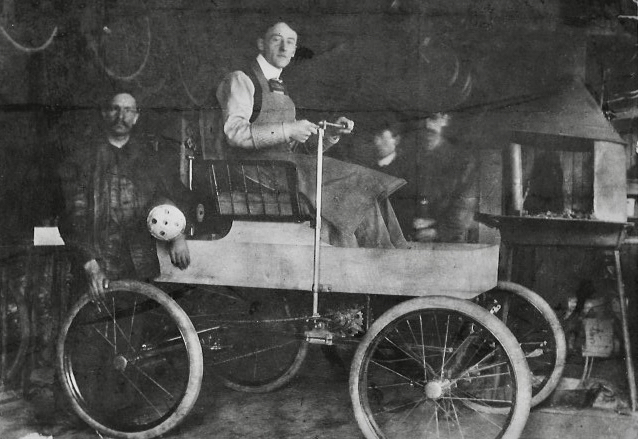
George Foote Foss in his Fossmobile without the motor.

Foss never tried to market or mass-produce his automobile. Despite this, he turned down an offer from a private investor who was willing to finance the production of his automobile. In 1900, Foss met with Henry Ford, who offered him a chance to help build a new company that Ford was trying to establish. However, Foss declined Ford's offer, believing that Ford's automobile was inferior to the Fossmobile. Shortly after their encounter, Ford went on to establish the Ford Motor Company.

In 1902, Foss moved to Montreal and became an automobile salesman, securing distribution rights for the Crestmobile, which was manufactured in Cambridge, Massachusetts. In this role, he was also able to test-drive various makes and models as they entered the market. He eventually had the opportunity to drive a Ford automobile, and remarked that it was indeed a well-made vehicle.

In 1912, at the age of 37, Foss went back to working as a machinist. He opened a machine shop in Montreal called George F. Foss Machines and became a key contributor in the manufacturing of parts for World War I. Foss retired in 1932 after a lengthy illness. However, in December 1946 he started Chester Lines Ltd, which operated excursion boat tours (Island Queen / M.V. Ville-Maire) on Lake Saint-Louis.

== Recognition ==
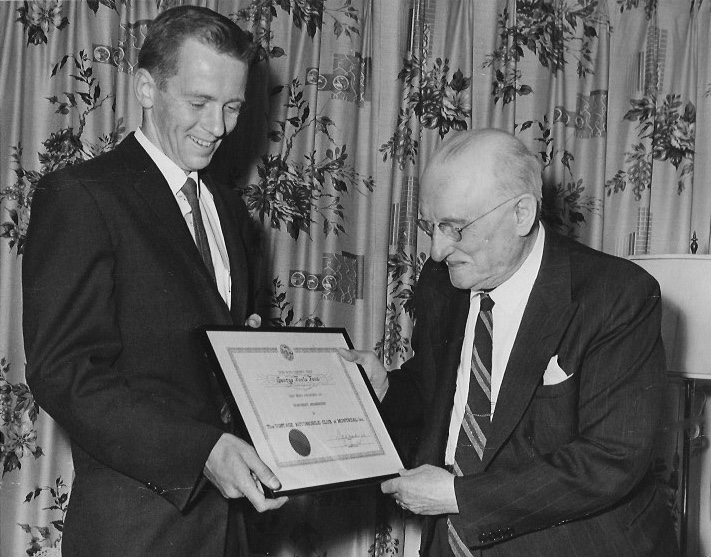
George Foote Foss receiving his Honorary Membership - Vintage Automobile Club of Montreal.

In 1960, Foss became an honorary member of the Vintage Automobile Club of Montreal. That same year, he was also awarded an honorary membership to the Antique Automobile Club of America. He and Colonel Robert Samuel McLaughlin are the only two Canadians to have received this honor. On August 23, 1997, the City of Sherbrooke, Quebec, unveiled a stone monument near the original site of his bicycle repair shop.

== Personal life ==
Foss married Gertrude Louise Maclagan in 1902 in Sherbrooke, Quebec. He died in Chateauguay, Quebec, on November 23, 1968, at the age of 92.
