= John Nicholson Anhut =

American lawyer

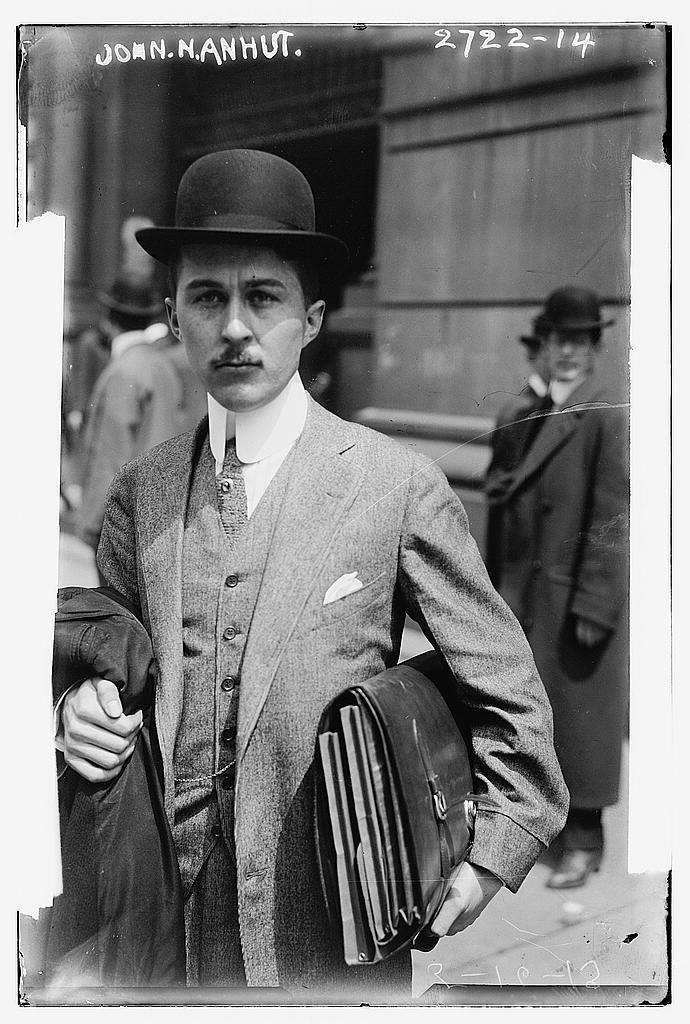

John Nicholson Anhut (January 8, 1884 – May 1977) was the founder of the Anhut Motor Car Company of Detroit, Michigan.

== Biography ==
Anhut married Elizabeth Bouvier Walsh.

He was elected to the Michigan Senate in 1908. He represented the 4th district from 1909 to 1910 as a Republican. After the failure of the Anhut company, he eventually moved to New York, where he gained admittance to the 26.

In 1912 he was accused of attempting to bribe physicians of Harry K. Thaw while Thaw was institutionalized at the Matteawan State Hospital for the Criminally Insane. Anhut was found guilty of bribery, and was sentenced to not less than four years in the State Prison.

In the 1930s Anhut was active in the hotel industry, buying the Imperial and Clifford hotels in downtown Detroit, as well as being the attorney for the Detroit Hotel Association.
