= List of automobiles manufactured in Ontario =

This is a list of automobile assembly plants in Ontario, Canada. Ontario produces more vehicles than any other jurisdiction in North America, with six of the world's top manufacturers operating assembly plants in Windsor, Brampton, Oakville, Alliston, Woodstock, Cambridge, Ingersoll, and Oshawa.

== Ford Motor Company ==
Plant Name	Address	Products
Oakville Assembly	1400 The Canadian Rd, Oakville, ON L6H 1A7	Ford Super Duty

== General Motors ==
Plant Name	Address	Products
CAMI Assembly	300 Ingersoll St S, Ingersoll, ON N5C 4A6	
Oshawa Car Assembly	900 Park Rd S, Oshawa, ON L1J 1N6	Chevrolet Silverado

== Honda ==
Plant Name	Address	Products
Honda of Canada Manufacturing Alliston Plant	4700 Industrial Pkwy, Alliston, ON L9R 1A2	Plant 1 Honda Civic Plant 2 Honda CR-V

== Stellantis ==
Plant Name	Address	Products
Windsor Assembly	2199 Chrysler Centre, Windsor, ON N8W 3Y3	Chrysler Pacifica Chrysler Voyager/Grand Caravan, Dodge Charger

== Toyota ==
Plant Name	Address	Products
Toyota Motor Manufacturing Canada Cambridge Facility	1055 Fountain St N, Cambridge, ON N3H 4R7	North Plant Toyota RAV4, Lexus NX South Plant Lexus RX
Toyota Motor Manufacturing Canada Woodstock Facility	1717 Dundas St, Woodstock, ON N4S 7V9	West Plant Toyota RAV4

== See also ==
- Automotive industry in Canada
