= Canadian Automotive Museum =

- Entrance on Simcoe Street
- Established: 1962; 64 years ago
- Location: 99 Simcoe Street South; Oshawa, Ontario; L1H 4G7
- Coordinates: 43°53′41.5″N 78°51′43.8″W
- Type: Automobile museum
- Collection size: 85+ cars
- Website: Canadian Automotive Museum

The Canadian Automotive Museum is an automobile museum located in Oshawa, Ontario, Canada. The museum notably features many Canadian-made cars. The automobile industry, specifically the Canadian division of the General Motors, known as General Motors Canada, has been based in Oshawa since the early 20th century.

== History ==
The museum was founded in 1962 by a group of Oshawa businessmen through the Oshawa Chamber of Commerce. The venture was initiated mainly to preserve the automotive history of Canada and to present this history in an educational and entertaining manner. Canadian Automotive Museum, Inc. is a charitable corporation and has been in operation since 1963.

The museum is housed in a 25,000 sq ft (2,300 m^{2}) building in downtown Oshawa that was originally the location of Ontario Motor Sales, a local car dealership, in the 1920s. The building maintains its original period architecture right down to the original elevator used to move cars to the second floor.

== Vehicles on display ==
The museum has two floors: the ground floors features foreign cars, while the upstairs features a "Made in Canada" exhibit.

Decade	Year	Make and model	Notes
Before 1910	1897	Fossmobile	Replica of original.
Before 1910	1898	Woods Electric	The oldest surviving electric vehicle in Canada.
Before 1910	1903	Orient Buckboard	
Before 1910	1903	Redpath Messenger	
Before 1910	1904	Ford Model C Replica	
Before 1910	1905	McLaughlin Carriage	
Before 1910	1908	Tudhope-McIntyre Model HH Phaeton	
Before 1910	1908	McLaughlin Model F	
Before 1910	1909	Kennedy	
Before 1910	1909	Model T	Canadian-built
1910s	1910	McKay Torpedo Coupe	Features semi-historical modifications.
1910s	1910	Hupmobile Model 20 Runabout	
1910s	1911	De Dion-Bouton Roadster	
1910s	1911	International Harvester Auto Wagon	
1910s	1911	Cartercar Touring	
1910s	1912	Rolls-Royce Silver Ghost	Originally owned by Lady Eaton
1910s	1912	McLaughlin 5 Passenger Touring	
1910s	1913	Wolseley 16/20 Model C6 Touring	
1910s	1914	Rolls-Royce Silver Ghost	distinguished by its use by the Prince of Wales on his 1919 Royal Tour
1910s	1914	McLaughlin Model 14 Truck	
1910s	1914	Galt Gas-Electric	
1910s	1914	Brockville-Atlas	
1910s	1916	Ford T Touring	
1910s	1917	Chevrolet 490 Touring	
1910s	1918	Chevrolet 490 Snowmobile	
1910s	1918	Packard Twin Six 3-25 Touring	
1910s	1919	Rauch & Lang Electric Brougham	
1920s	1922	Kissel Gold Bug 6-45 Speedster	
1920s	1922	McLaughlin-Buick 22-49 Special	
1920s	1923	Gray-Dort 23B Special Touring	
1920s	1923	Vauxhall 30-98 Velox	Not on display as of July, 2026.
1920s	1924	Chevrolet Superior Series F Touring Coupe.	
1920s	1925	Brooks Steamer Model 2/3 Sedan	
1920s	1926	Ford TT Tanker Truck	
1920s	1926	Isotta Fraschini Tipo 8A S Sala Torpedo Phaeton Tourer	
1920s	1926	Willys Whippet Four Coupe	
1920s	1926	Bentley 3 Litre 4-Seater Speed Model	
1920s	1926	Chevrolet Superior Series V Sedan	
1920s	1927	Dodge Brothers Series 126 Sedan	
1920s	1928	Durant D-55 Special Sedan	
1920s	1928	Hispano Suiza H6B 4-Seater Touring	
1920s	1928	Hudson Sedan	
1920s	1928	Bugatti Type 37	
1920s	1929	Ford Model A Convertible Cabriolet	
1920s	1929	Chevrolet Series AC International Roadster	With wire wheels.
1920s	1929	Oakland Olympic Six	Not on display as of July, 2026.
1920s	1929	Henderson Streamline KJ	
1920s	1929	Sunbeam Model 9	
1920s	1930s	1930	Marquette 30-30 Two Door Sedan
1931	1930s	Ford Model A Deluxe Coupe	
1931	1930s	Alfa Romeo 6C 1750 Gran Sport	Body coachbuilt by Zagato.
1931	1930s	McLaughlin-Buick Model 67	
1931	1930s	Francis-Barnett Black Hawk Model 17	
1932	1930s	Frontenac 6-85	
1933	1930s	Francis-Barnett Black Hawk	
1934	1930s	McLaughlin-Buick 66S Sport Coupe	
1934	1930s	Rolls Royce 20/25 Convertible Sedan	
1937	1930s	Buick Series 80C Roadmaster	
1937	1930s	Rolls-Royce Phantom III	
1937	1930s	REO Speed Delivery Pickup	
1939	1930s	Rolls-Royce Wraith	
1940s	1930s	1949	Meteor
1950s	1950	Oldsmobile 76	
1950s	1952	Vauxhall Wyvern Station Wagon	Custom-built for Samuel McLaughlin.
1950s	1952	Velocette 2 Cyl Water Cooled motorcycle	
1950s	1955	Pontiac Laurentian	
1950s	1955	Buick Special	
1950s	1957	Dodge Regent	
1960s	1960	Frontenac	
1960s	1960	Rolls-Royce Phantom V Limousine	
1960s	1962	Lotus Formula Junior	
1960s	1963	Buick Custom Limousine	Originally owned by Canadian Prime Minister Lester B. Pearson
1960s	1963	Phelon & Moore Panther with Garrard Sidecar	Not on display as of July, 2026.
1960s	1965	Suzuki Sportsman	
1960s	1966	Buick Special	
1960s	1966	Corvair	
1960s	1966	Honda 50	
1960s	1966	Raleigh RM 9 Ultramatic	
1960s	1969	Daimler Limousine	Originally used in royal visits to the Isle of Man.
1970s	1971	Manic GT	Not on display as of July, 2026.
1970s	1972	Buick Electra	
1970s	1972	Yamaha U7E	
1970s	1974	Rupp Dart Go-Kart “Herbie”	
1970s	1975	Bricklin SV-1	
1970s	1975	Can-Am T’NT	
1980s	1981	Plymouth Reliant	
1980s	1983	DMC DeLorean	Canadian specification.
1980s	1987	Magna Torrero Concept Car	
1990s	1999	Chevrolet Lumina	Final Chevrolet Lumina produced at GM Oshawa factory.
2000s	2001	1964 Renault Dauphine Electric	Made by Feel Good Motors.
2000s	2008	ZENN	

== Special events ==
Every September, the museum participates in a classic car rally known as the "Cobble Beach Concours d'Elegance & Motoring Festival". It is held at the Cobble Beach Golf Links course overlooking Georgian Bay in Kemble, Ontario. Kemble is located on the Bruce Peninsula in Grey County, north of Owen Sound.

== Museum affiliations ==
The museum collaborates regularly with the Oshawa Museum and the city's Parkwood Estate, the home of Samuel McLaughlin.

The CAM maintains ties with another Oshawa museum having a similar emphasis on vehicles, the tank museum of the Ontario Regiment of the Royal Canadian Armoured Corps (RCAC).

The museum is affiliated with the Canadian Museums Association (CMA), Digital Museums Canada, and the Virtual Museum of Canada.

== See also ==
- Manitoba Antique Automobile Museum
- McLaughlin Carriage Company
