= Manic GT =

Canadian sports car

Manic GT PAI
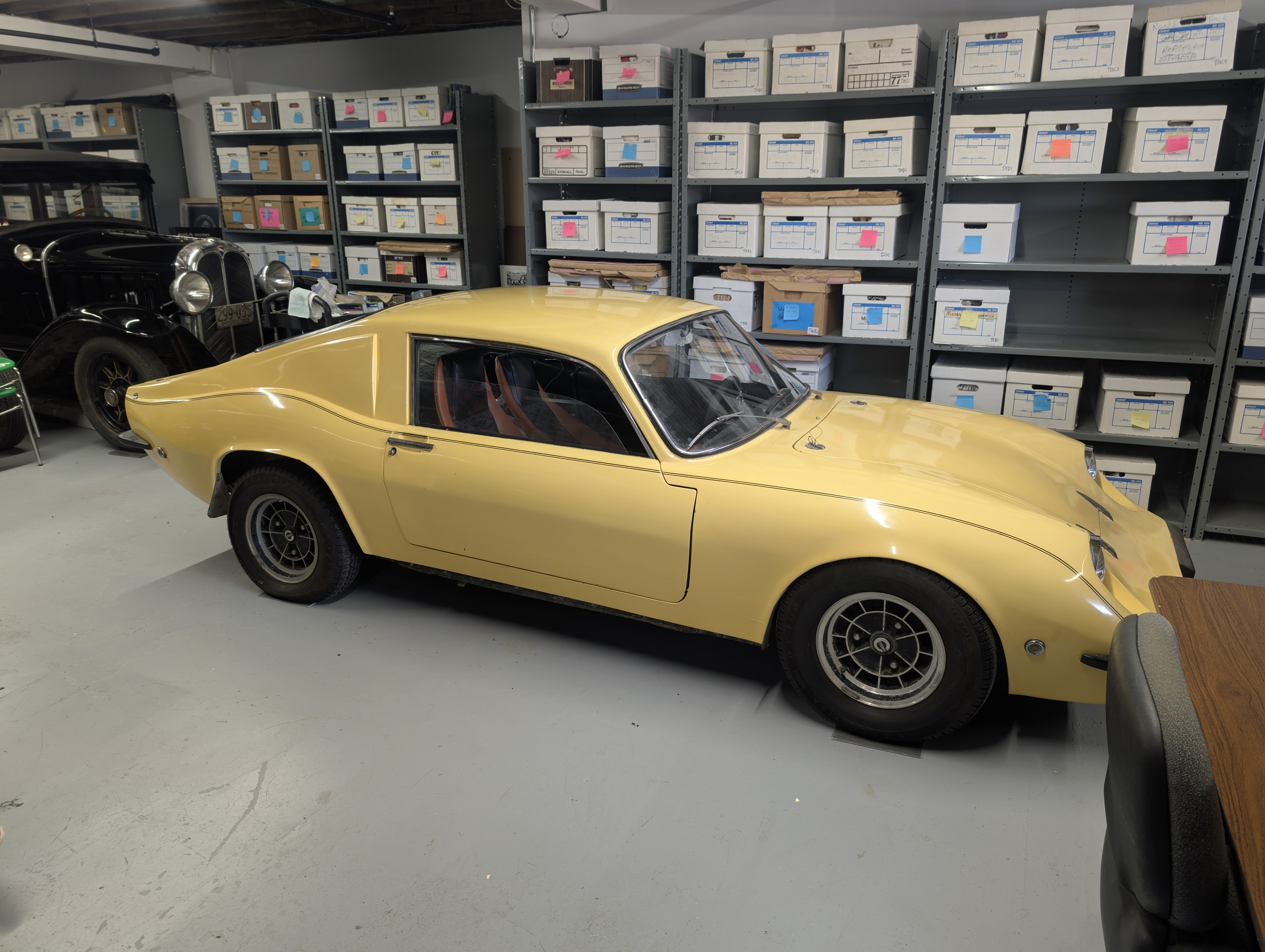
- Manic GT

Overview
- Manufacturer: Automobiles Manic
- Model years: 1969 - 1971
- Assembly: Canada: Terrebonne, PQ (1969-1970); Granby, PQ (1970-1971)

Body and chassis
- Class: Sports car
- Body style: 2-door berlinette
- Layout: Rear-engine, rear-wheel-drive

Powertrain
- Engine: 1,289 cc (78.7 cu in) I4
- Transmission: 4-speed manual (base); 5-speed manual (optional)

Dimensions
- Wheelbase: 2,280 mm (89.8 in)
- Length: 4,127 mm (162.5 in)
- Width: 1,500 mm (59.1 in)
- Height: 1,143 mm (45.0 in)
- Kerb weight: 658 kg (1,451 lb)

Chronology
- Predecessor: None
- Successor: None

The Manic GT is a sports car that was built in the province of Québec in Canada from 1969 to 1971. Production of the car was first based in Terrebonne and was later moved to Granby.

== Jacques About — early biography ==
Jacques About was born in France on 14 February 1938. He was the son of Pierre About, a French automotive journalist and editor of l'Équipe. About's early childhood was spent in Indo-China, including Vietnam. He and his family spent one year in a concentration camp in the region. About returned to France for his secondary education. In 1955 he emigrated to Québec to study at the Collège Stanislas. He also began to study judo, eventually teaching it at the college and opening nine judo schools in Montreal. Among his students was a young Montreal lawyer named Pierre Elliott Trudeau. In 1961 About returned to France, where he pursued a variety of occupations, including testing cars for l'Equipe, interior decorating, and working as a movie stuntman. He moved again, this time to Japan, where he attended Tenri University on a judo scholarship, and studied judo, Zen, floral design, and Japanese, becoming fluent in the language. After completing his studies in Japan, About returned to France, where he met the visiting head of Renault Canada, who hired him to work in public relations for the company in Canada.

In late 1968 About left Renault and established Les Automobiles Manic Inc. The company's name, pronounced "/mæˈnɪk/", was a shortened version of the Montagnais word for Québec's Manicouagan River and its Manic-5 hydroelectric dam, since renamed the Daniel-Johnson Dam, whose curves inspired About.

== Inception of the GT ==
Prior to leaving France for his new job in Canada, About was asked by the head of Automobiles Alpine to assess the feasibility of selling the Alpine A110 berlinette in the North American market. At that time Alpine was an independent company (Renault took a controlling interest in Alpine in 1974) that used Renault engines in their cars, which were then sold through Renault dealers in Europe. About completed his assessment and reported back that there was a market, but for a simpler, more comfortable, and less expensive car than the A110 — one that would preferably be assembled in Canada. About received no news for a year, and when he heard that an Alpine supplied from Mexico might be marketed in Canada, he traveled to France to force the issue, but was rebuffed. He decided then to build his own sports car.

About discussed his plans with Maurice Gris, a young mechanic who had also immigrated from France. Gris was working for Renault Canada in Saint-Bruno when About met him and convinced the young man to prepare the Renault that About was then racing. Committing to the project, Gris moved in with About and the woman who would become About's wife in 1968, Pauline Vincent — an entertainment reporter in Montreal. An early attempt to have a contractor create a prototype for the car resulted in an unfinished body that About felt was too ugly to use.

== Manic-GRAC ==
In January 1968 About saw an opportunity to get into open-wheeled Formula racing when he heard about the French "Groupe de Recherches Automobiles de Course" (GRAC — "Racing Cars Research Group") and the cars they had developed for the Formula France series. About and Vincent took out a $4000 loan and acquired the Canadian rights to the GRAC car. They set up in a small workshop on the south shore of Montreal. Gris was sent to France to see how the cars were built, and later some GRAC personnel went to Montreal to provide more instruction. Even so the final product was heavily adapted by About and company.

The car was called the Manic-GRAC. With sponsorship from Gitanes cigarettes, it was campaigned by the company's own team, l'Écurie Manic, in Formula C. Serge Soumille had traveled from his home in France to Québec to accompany his wife, singer and Eurovision winner Rachel Ros, on a tour of the province. In France Soumille worked in electronics for a French automaker while also being involved in racing, and was interested in finding a ride while in Canada. He met Jacques Duval, founder and editor-in-chief of Guide de l'auto, who gave him About's address. After paying About a visit, Soumille was hired to drive the Manic-GRAC. What was supposed to have been a three month sojourn in Québec turned into a three year stay for Soumille.

The Manic-GRAC enjoyed a measure of success, setting track records at Saint-Jovite and Mosport. It also garnered publicity which raised the profile of the young company.

The company later developed an endurance racer called the Manic PA-II. This car was built to run in the Group 6 class for prototypes, and had full barquette-style bodywork, an inline four cylinder engine built by Brian Hart, a Hewland transaxle and a Lotus Formula 2 style chassis. The car made an appearance at the 6 Hours of ACAM at the Mont-Tremblant circuit in October 1970, where it retired with suspension damage. The team had plans for up to three cars, driven by Jacques Couture and John Cannon, but this three car team never materialized. The PA-II went into storage at the Manic factory and is believed to have been sold when the factory assets were liquidated.

== Manic GT ==
Work on the sports car project resumed in earnest in June 1968, with Soumille serving as designer and Gris responsible for assembly and production. To create a uniquely Canadian visual identity, the styling of the car was to be a hybrid, with the front end reflecting contemporary European style and the rear displaying an American influence. The result was a compact two passenger road-going berlinette that About dubbed the Manic GT PAI, but is commonly called the Manic GT.

The first Manic GT prototype was built with a $25,000 investment from a small group of lawyers in Montreal that included Jean de Brabant, a distant relative of About's. In early 1970 the company relocated to Terrebonne.

The prototype was first shown to the public at the Montreal Auto Show in April 1969. That same year it was also displayed at the Québec Pavilion at the Worlds Fair in Osaka Japan. As many as 35 prototypes were built before the first real production Manic GT came off the assembly line.

After the car's debut About was able to secure financial backing from Placement Bombardier, International Capital Inc., the Steinberg family, Caisse de Dépôt, l'Office du Crédit Industriel du Québec and the Canadian federal government, with the federal grant contingent on the company moving to the economically depressed region of Granby, Québec. Initial capitalization reached more than $1,500,000.

About contracted with Renault to use the chassis and power-train from the Renault 8 and 10 sedans as the basis for the Manic GT.

Production of the GT began in October 1969 at the Terrebonne factory. The car was advertised at a price of $3384.00 Canadian fully equipped. In its final form the GT made another appearance at the Montreal Auto Show in 1970, where it was displayed alongside the Manic-GRAC and the PA-II.

About restructured the company and renamed it Les Automobiles Manic (1970) Ltée. A new 5,574 m^{2} (60,000 sq ft) factory was built in Granby. The factory opened on 1 January 1971 with 40 employees. Production was anticipated to be 2000 cars per year. Staff would later grow to 150 persons. The Manic GT was to be sold by the 600 North American Renault dealerships that existed at the time, and serviced by Renault garage franchisees.

The factory soon ran into problems obtaining parts from Renault. While major components for unfinished cars sat on the factory floor many smaller but still critical parts were not available. The factory attempted to fill their requirements by buying parts from Renault dealers in Mexico and Spain. With no financial penalty for late delivery written into their supplier agreement with Renault, Automobiles Manic had little recourse other than to threaten to withhold payment, which only worsened the relationship with Renault.

Investors in Manic demanded that Renault assume the losses caused by these delays. Renault refused and the investors subsequently cut off funding for the company.

In April 1971, the Manic GT made two important appearances in the United States. In Detroit, a GT was successfully homologated for sale in the US. In New York a GT was put on display at that city's 1971 Auto Show. An order for 1000 cars was received from an American distributor, but this came too late to change the company's fortunes.

The Granby factory was closed in May 1971, and on 8 June 1971, Les Automobiles Manic officially ceased operations.

While estimates vary, the number of Manic GTs produced is typically said to have been 160. As of early 2019, fewer than forty examples were registered.

== Features ==
The design used many parts from the Renault 8. The car was built on a Renault 8 platform chassis with a steel roll-over structure added to improve safety and add stiffness to the frame.

The body of molded fiberglass was bonded, rather than bolted, to the chassis. While this further stiffened the structure, it made repairs difficult.

The suspension was independent at all four wheels via coil springs and telescopic dampers. An anti-roll bar was mounted at the front.

Disc brakes were used at all four wheels. Steering was by rack-and-pinion.

Mounted behind the prototype's rear axle centre-line was a 1,108 cc (67.6 cu in) Renault Cléon-Fonte (aka "Sierra") engine. This Cam-in-block inline four-cylinder motor had a wet-linered cast-iron block with five main bearings and an alloy cylinder head with overhead valves. The production car's engine was still a Cléon-Fonte but was the 1,289 cc (78.7 cu in) "810" version available in the Renault 10. The car was offered in three stages of tune: 65, 80, and 105 hp (48.5, 59.7, and 78.3 kW), permitting top speeds of 169, 193, and 217 km/h (105, 120, and 135 mph) respectively.

Power reached the rear wheels through a standard four-speed manual transmission, while a five-speed was available as an option.

Standard equipment included an AM-FM radio, a cigarette lighter and an electric clock.

== Technical details ==
Manic GT	Details
Engine:	Renault Cléon-Fonte Inline four cylinder engine
Displacement:	1,289 cc (78.66 cu in) (prototype: 1,108 cc (67.61 cu in))
Bore × Stroke:	73 mm × 77 mm (2.87 in × 3.03 in) (prototype: 70 mm × 72 mm (2.76 in × 2.83 in))
Compression ratio:	8.0:1, 9.6:1, 10.5:1, depending on level of tune.
Maximum power:	48.5, 59.7, or 78.3 kW (65, 80, or 105 hp), depending on level of tune.
Valvetrain:	Single cam-in-block, two overhead valves per cylinder
Induction:	Naturally aspirated
Cooling:	Water-cooled
Transmission:	4-speed manual, optional 5-speed
Brakes f/r:	Disc/disc
Steering:	Rack and pinion
Suspension front:	Upper and lower wishbones, coil springs, telescopic dampers, anti-roll bar
Suspension rear:	Trailing arms, coil springs, dual telescopic dampers
Body/Chassis:	Fiberglass body bonded to steel platform chassis with internal steel roll cage
Wheelbase:	2,267 mm (89.25 in)
Tires f/r:	135 × 15 / 135 × 15 (optional: 155 × 13 / 165 × 13)
Length; Width; Height:	4,128 mm (162.5 in); 1,500 mm (59.1 in); 1,143 mm (45 in)
Weight:	658 kg (1,450 lb)
Maximum speed:	169, 193, or 217 km/h (105, 120, or 135 mph), depending on level of tune.
Fuel capacity:	8 imp gal (36.4 L; 9.6 US gal)
Fuel economy:	35–42 mpg_{‑imp} (29.1–35.0 mpg_{‑US}; 8.1–6.7 l/100 km)

== Legacy ==
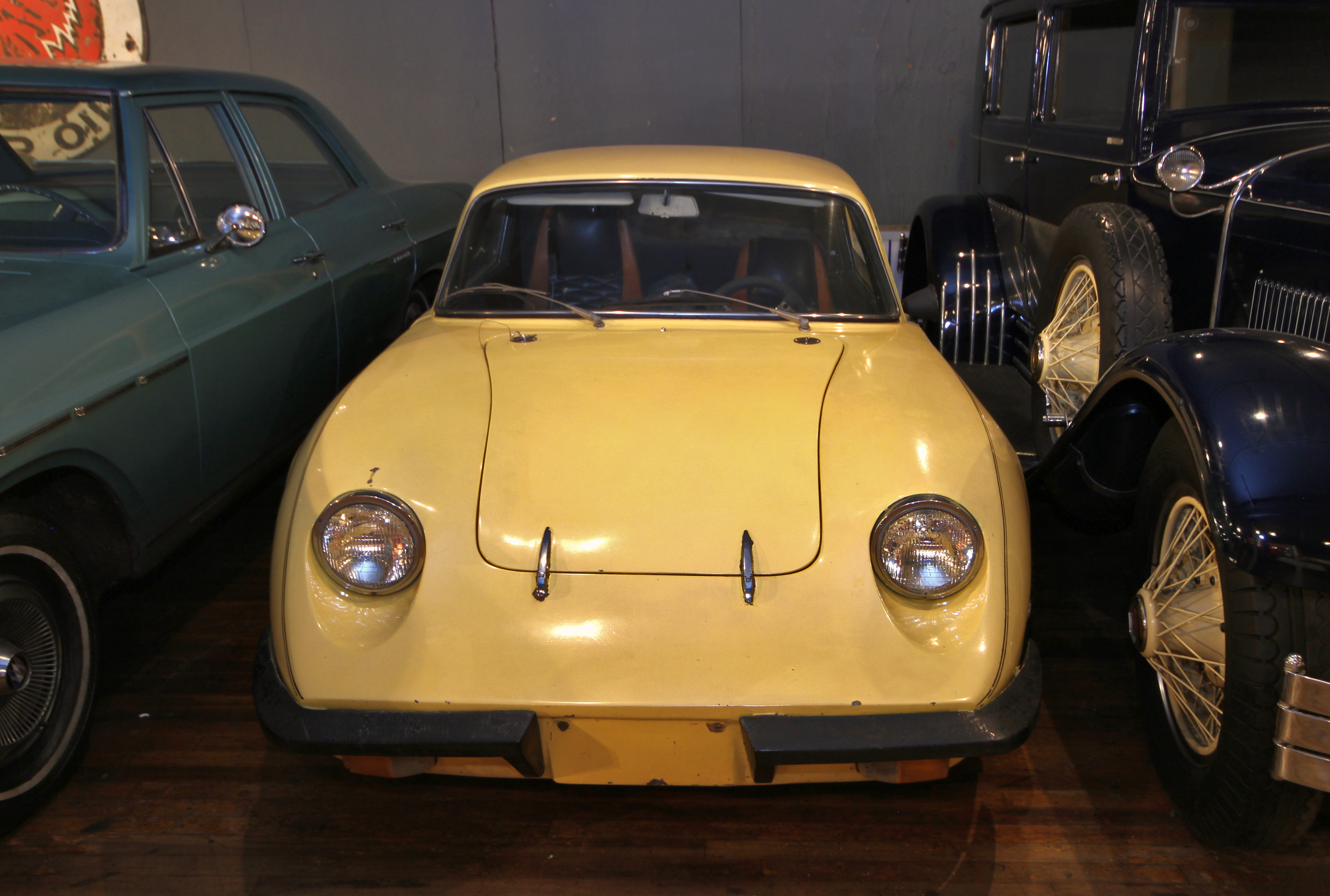
A Manic GT stored at the Canadian Automotive Museum.

A Manic GT is part of the collection at the Canadian Automotive Museum in Oshawa Ontario.

A Manic GT is part of the virtual online exhibition "In Search of the Canadian Car" at the Canada Science and Technology Museum.

A Manic GT was displayed at the 2009 Canadian Concours d'Élégance at Terrebonne.

A Manic GT was featured at the 2010 Montreal Auto Show.

A Manic GT was displayed at the Avignon Motor Festival in March 2011.

An unfinished car found during the liquidation of the factory was bought by journalist Glen Woodcock and restored. It won first place at the Antique and Classic Car Club of Canada's 49th annual Concours d'Élégance in August 2012. The car was destroyed in a fire later that same year.

Designer Soumille drove a Manic GT in a historic racing event in France. This may have been a Manic GT sent to Renault's head offices in France for evaluation, and was the only GT in Europe.

It is reported that a prototype for a planned successor to the GT has survived. The car has a custom steel-tubing chassis and the engine and transaxle from a Renault 12 turned 180° to mount in a mid-engined configuration.

About continued to repay debts incurred by Automobiles Manic until 1984. He also returned to his career in education, founding the Académie Sainte-Thérèse in 1982. The Campus Jacques About there is named in his honour.

Jacques About died on 18 April 2013 at age 75 due to complications of multiple sclerosis. He was survived by spouse Lorraine Caron and son Pierre.

About's son Pierre owns Manic GT chassis number 74.

== See also ==
- List of automobile manufacturers
