= Project Arrow =

Overview
- Production: January 2023 (concept car)

Body and chassis
- Body style: 5-door crossover

Project Arrow is an electric vehicle developed and produced by the Canadian Automotive Parts Manufacturer's Association. It was partially presented at their annual conference on October 19, 2022.

The name Project Arrow is a reference to the Avro Canada CF-105 Arrow, a military aircraft created in Canada in the late 1950s.

It made its appearance at 2023 CES in Las Vegas.

== Overview ==
The vehicle will be fully electric and equipped with an advanced self-driving system provided by Canada's automotive suppliers, more than 400 of which have expressed interest in the project. It was revealed fully to the public at CES in January 2023.
