= O'Keefe and Drew =

O'Keefe and Drew was a meat packer and pork retailer based in Chatham, Ontario.

== History ==
The company was founded by Joseph T. O'Keefe and Thomas A. Drew.

The packing plant was east of the city, where Grand Trunk and Pere Marquette railways met. The retail operation was at #53 King Street West, between John Hales' butcher shop and Bright's Opera House; it would later house Percy Parliament's clothing store.

The packing plant was later taken over by the Darling Company, which used it to render tallow; Darling closed in the 1970s.

The partners would later help found the Chatham Motor Car Company.
