= Fossmobile =

Internal combustion

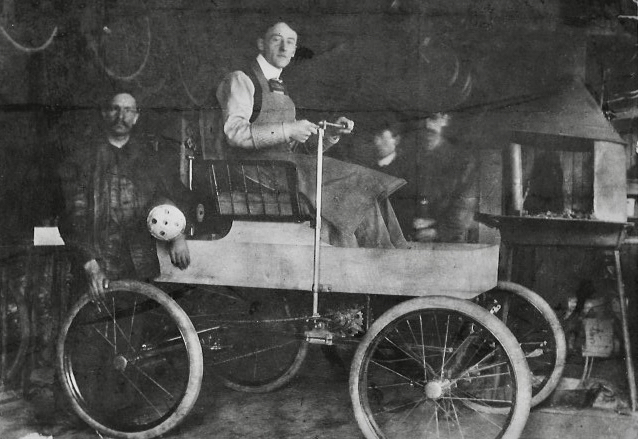
- Image of the original Fossmobile, without a motor.

Overview
- Manufacturer: George Foote Foss
- Production: 1896–1897; Sold (1902) for $75

Body and chassis
- Body style: 2 seat roadster

Powertrain
- Engine: 1 cylinder, 4HP, Gasoline
- Transmission: 2 speed, chain driven (No reverse)

Dimensions
- Wheelbase: Unknown
- Curb weight: Unknown

The Fossmobile was Canada’s first successful internal combustion, gasoline engine automobile. Manufactured by George Foote Foss in 1897, only one Fossmobile is known to have existed.

== History ==
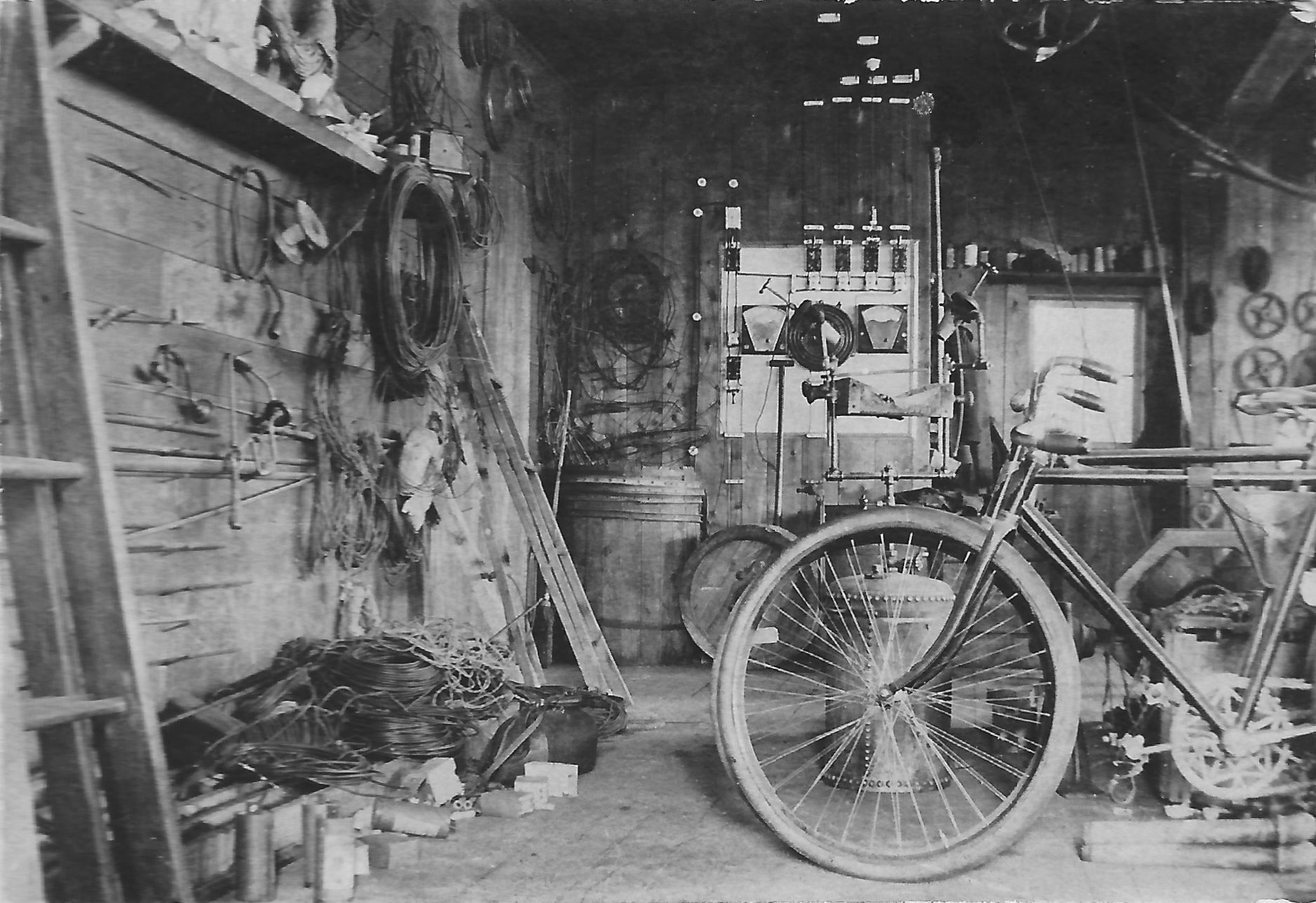
The inside of George Foote Foss' machine shop where the Fossmobile was built.

The Fossmobile was designed and manufactured by George Foote Foss. He owned his own shop in Sherbrooke, Quebec, offering machining, blacksmithing, and bicycle repair. He became interested in automobiles after riding in an electric brougham while visiting Boston, Massachusetts. During the winter of 1896, Foss worked on a four-horsepower, single-cylinder automobile that he completed in the spring of 1897. The vehicle was the first of its kind to be built in Canada.

Foss drove his car in and around Sherbrooke, Quebec for four years. He later moved to Montreal, Quebec, where the car sat idle for a year before he sold it for $75 in 1902. Foss had previously turned down an offer to partner with Henry Ford from the Ford Motor Company. He turned down the offer as he believed Ford's vehicle to be inferior to the Fossmobile. He also turned down financial backing to mass produce the Fossmobile, citing his inexperience to do so.

== Vehicle specifications ==
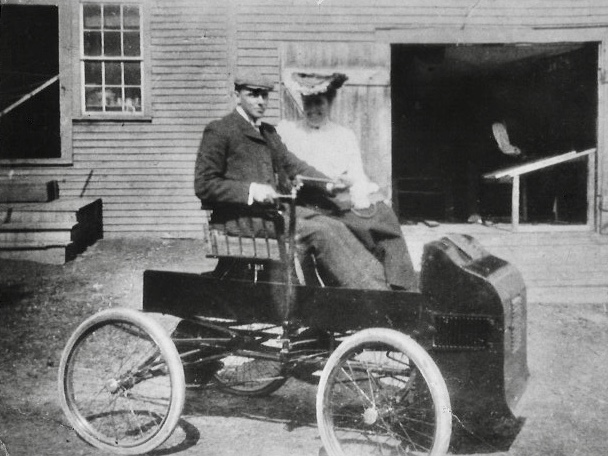
George Foote Foss' brother Harry, on a trial run of the finished Fossmobile.

The "Fossmobile," as it was later dubbed, was different from other automobiles that were being built, as it had a front mounted engine. Other automobile designers had placed their engines centered and beneath the seat. The Fossmobile's front mounted engine made maintenance easier and produced considerably less upward vibration through the seat. The gear shifter for the Fossmobile was mounted directly on the tiller style steering column, something that was not done by other manufacturers for another 40 years. The vehicle could travel up to 15 MPH (24 km per hour) and climb any of Sherbrooke's steep hills.

== (Tribute) Replica ==
A (tribute) replica Fossmobile was built in time for the 125th anniversary, by a team in Burlington, Ontario, spearheaded by Foss's grandson Ronald M. Foss. It was shown in Sherbrooke, Quebec, and again at the Cobble Beach Concours l'Elegance in Kemble, Ontario, before being donated by the family to the Canadian Automotive Museum in Oshawa, Ontario in December 2022.
