= Canada–United States Automotive Products Agreement =

1965 trade agreement between Canada and the United States

- Type: Trade agreement
- Signed: 1965
- Expiry: February 19, 2001
- Parties: Canada; United States

The Canada–United States Automotive Products Agreement, commonly known as the Auto Pact, was a trade agreement between Canada and the United States. It was signed by Prime Minister Lester B. Pearson and President Lyndon B. Johnson in January 1965.

== History ==
During the years before the Canada—United States Automotive Products Agreement was in place, a series of tariffs were imposed on cars, trucks, buses, tires, and automotive parts which moved between Canada and the United States. The automotive industry in Canada was highly segregated from the automotive industry in the United States: only three percent of vehicles sold in Canada were made in the United States, but most of the parts were manufactured in the U.S. and overall Canada was in a large trade deficit with the United States in the automobile sector.

The imposition of the tariffs led American automobile companies to produce models of cars specifically for sale in Canada, assembled at branch plants there. Although these models were sold under different names, they were similar to the American models, but with cosmetic changes in design.

The signing of the agreement in 1965 removed the tariffs between the two countries. In exchange, the Big Three car makers (General Motors, Ford, and Chrysler) and later Volvo agreed that automobile production in Canada would not fall below 1964 levels and that they would ensure the same production-sales ratio in Canada. The two stated goals of the Auto Pact were to reduce production costs in Canada through more efficient production of a smaller range of vehicles and components, and to lower vehicle prices for consumers.

After the signing of the Pact, far fewer models of cars were produced in Canada; instead, larger branch plants producing only one model for all of North America were constructed. In 1964, only seven percent of vehicles made in Canada were sent south of the border, but by 1968, the figure was sixty percent. By the same date, forty percent of cars purchased in Canada were made in the United States. Automobile and parts production soon surpassed pulp and paper to become Canada's largest industry. From 1965 to 1982, Canada's total automotive trade deficit with the U.S. was $12.1 billion; this combined a surplus of around $28 billion worth of assembled vehicles and a deficit of around $40.5 billion in auto parts.

The agreement resulted in lowered prices and increased production in Canada, creating thousands of jobs and increasing wages. These newly created jobs were highly localised to southern Ontario, with little employment benefit to the rest of Canada. However, approximately one-third of Canada's population resides in southern Ontario as of 2017.

The jobs created by the new market conditions under the pact were almost exclusively blue collar; administration, research and development remained in the United States. This transfer of control of Canadian automaking operations to their US parent corporations substantially reduced the autonomy of the Canadian operations with respect to vehicle and component specification, design, and sourcing; manufacturing and production, branding and marketing, and corporate policy.

The agreement also prevented Canada pursuing free trade in automobiles elsewhere internationally, and this North American exclusivity led Transport Canada to adopt the Federal Motor Vehicle Safety Standards (FMVSS) of the U.S. National Highway Traffic Safety Administration rather than participating in the European-based development of international consensus on auto safety and emissions regulations.

By January of 1994, the new NAFTA agreement had gone into effect, which now included free trade on various other goods and products not just limited to automobiles, and had Mexico as a member as well. In January of 1995, these three countries and many others across the world had joined the newly formed World Trade Organization, which was to be the successor to the GATT group.

Other automobile manufacturers around the world complained to the World Trade Organization that the agreement to eliminate tariffs only for the Big Three companies gave these companies an unfair sales advantage in Canada. By joining the new WTO a few years earlier, Canada and the USA would be subject to its rulings and face a potential expulsion from the group if it did not comply by shutting down the Auto Pact. The Auto Pact was abolished in 2001 after a WTO ruling declared it illegal, though by that time the North American Free Trade Agreement had effectively superseded it. Furthermore, the 1998 Chrysler-Daimler merger was a sign that showed that the North American automobile bloc was already less isolated than before and open to the global market. The transition from Auto Pact to NAFTA went by smoothly with the Auto Pact having already fulfilled its purpose by improving and integrating the North American automobile industry. To this day, the industry in the region continues to make around 13 million cars each year.

== See also ==
- Automotive industry in Canada
