= Redpath Motor Vehicle Company =

Small automobile manufacturer in Canada in the early 20th century

The Redpath Motor Vehicle Company was a small automobile manufacturer in Ontario, Canada in the early 20th century. It was located in Kitchener from 1893 – 1902 by Walter Redpath of Keene ON in a partnership with Andrew Reid of Toronto ON.

The Redpath Messenger had a wooden carriage body using a one-cylinder engine with shaft drive and two speed manual transmission. It was the first vehicle in automotive history with a tilt steering wheel. It weighed approx 650 pounds (290 kg) and sold for between $600 and $700. Top speed of 10 miles per hour (16 km/h).

There is one 1903 model known to exist on display at Canadian Automotive Museum.
