= Chatham Motor Car Company =

Canadian automobile manufacturer

- Company type: Automobile manufacturing
- Industry: Automotive
- Genre: Touring cars
- Founded: 1906
- Defunct: 1909
- Headquarters: Chatham, Ontario, Canada
- Area served: Canada
- Products: Vehicles
- Number of employees: 40

The Chatham Motor Car Company was a Canadian brass era automobile manufacturer, based in Chatham, Ontario, from 1906 to 1909.

== History ==
The company was created in 1906. Investors included Joseph T. O'Keefe and Thomas A. Drew (partners in the O'Keefe and Drew pork retailers), T.K. Holmes (who became company president). W.J. Taylor (vice president), D. N. McMullen, Thomas Dillon (secretary-treasurer), J.F. Dillon (general manager).

They established a factory in a two-story building on Adelaide Street, about halfway between McGregor Creek and King Street, previously used by Hyslop and Ronald to build fire engines. The plant had 40 employees.

The company built only one model, the Chatham, right-hand drive five-passenger tourer with a 20 horsepower (15 kW; 20 PS) (later 25 horsepower (19 kW; 25 PS)) watercooled four cylinder engine.

The Chatham was priced at C$2500, when the Colt Runabout was priced at US$1500, the FAL US$1750, the Enger 40 and (in 1905) the Ford Model F were US$2000, while the high-volume Oldsmobile Runabout was US$650 and (in 1907) the $700 for the Ford Model S was US$700.

Chatham did not build its own bodies, instead, they were subcontracted to William Gray & Sons, a local carriage builder.

The car earned the loyalty of its buyers, but the company suffered financial difficulties, and in 1907, it was sued by a Detroit creditor and ultimately liquidated. Chatham dentist G. W. Cornell bought the company's assets and resumed production.

In 1908, a new Chatham appeared, the Chatham 30, with a new 30 hp (22 kW; 30 PS) engine and "tulip-style" body.

The new car was entered in endurance trials and scored some successes. One example was driven 3,000 mi (4,800 km) from Arcola, Saskatchewan to Chatham by J.B. Stauffer.

The company sold only 35 cars, mainly to Chatham's wealthiest residents, before shutting down in 1909.

The factory was purchased by Detroit's Anhut Motor Car Company in 1910, which continued to manufacture badge engineered Chathams under its own brand.

The factory building still stood in the 1960s.

== See also ==
- List of defunct automobile manufacturers
