= Derby (Canadian automobile) =

The Derby Motor Cars Ltd. was a Canadian automobile built in Saskatchewan between 1924 and 1927. Company principal Louis Arsenault believed that with a booming wheat trade in the Prairies, customers and investors would support a car company. Arsenault opened an office for Derby Motors in Winnipeg, Manitoba, in early 1924, following the dissolution of Winnipeg Motor Cars Ltd. in fall 1923.

The car was in fact an early example of badge engineering. Rather than build cars, Arsenault imported American built Davis cars, changed the nameplates to "Derby" and added "Derby" tire covers. Conversion of the cars took place in the former Marshall tractor factory in Saskatoon. The Derby used a Continental six-cylinder engine, and came in four different models:

- Series 92 tourer, selling for CDN$1995;
- Series 92 Man-o-War roadster, selling for CDN$1750;
- Series 92 Legionaire sedan, selling for CDN$1750;
- Series 93 sedan, selling for CDN$1750
- Series 93 coupe, selling for CDN$1750
- Series 93 tourer, selling for CDN$1750

According to surviving company records, 31 cars were sold before the venture folded in 1927, with original plan of building 50.
