= Russell Motor Car Company =

Defunct motor vehicle manufacturer based in Canada

Russell Motor Car Company, Ltd.
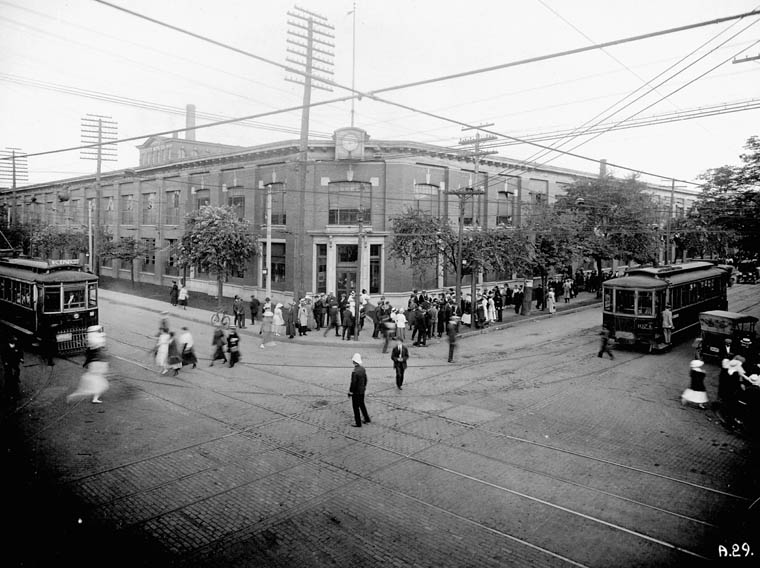
- Russell Motor Car Plant No. 2
- Industry: Automotive
- Predecessor: Canada Cycle & Motor Company
- Founded: Founded in 1899, automobiles,1904; 122 years ago
- Founder: T. A. "Tommy" Russell, General Manager
- Defunct: for automobiles,1915; 111 years ago
- Fate: discontinued car production
- Successor: Russell Industries, Ltd.
- Headquarters: Toronto, Ontario, Canada
- Area served: Agencies in the Commonwealth
- Key people: Tommy Russell
- Products: Automobiles
- Production output: unknown (1904-1915)

The Russell Motor Car Company was an automobile manufacturer in Toronto, Canada, that produced cars from 1904 to 1916. The company is considered to have produced Canada's first successful automobile.

== History ==
In 1903, weakness in the bicycle market prompted Canada Cycle and Motor Co. (C.C.M.), a bicycle manufacturer, to acquire the assets of Canadian Motors Ltd., a failed automobile producer. Tommy Russell (1877–1940), C.C.M.'s new general manager, saw an opportunity to diversify his company's product line.

From 1903 to 1905, C.C.M.'s new automobile division, named Russell Motor Car Company with Russell serving as president, began production of electric-powered two-passenger runabouts branded Ivanhoe. In 1905, the company produced its first "Model A" car with a two-cylinder gasoline engine. A larger "Model B", and a four-cylinder "Model C", arrived in 1906. A 40 horsepower touring car was introduced in 1907, with a more prestigious 50 horsepower model coming in 1908.

The Russell vehicles developed a reputation as well-built and engineered cars, and success allowed Russell to focus on the high-end market. Sales offices were opened in England, Australia and New Zealand. In Canada, Russell promoted its vehicles as "The Thoroughly Canadian Car," built with Canadian material, labour and capital. Marketing included publicity stunts such as races on frozen Lake Ontario between Russell cars and ice-yachts. The Russell Motor Car Company Limited was incorporated separately from C.C.M. in 1911.

The company began to experience difficulties with its sleeve valve engines in 1913, sold as Russell-Knights. A downturn in the high-end market, coupled with the commencement of the First World War in 1914, resulted in Russell selling its automobile production business to the American manufacturer Willys-Overland Motors in 1916. Russell produced munitions during the war, and manufactured automobile parts after the war ended. In 1938, the company changed its name to Russell Industries Limited, as it continued its shift away from the automobile industry, expanding into the manufacture of machine parts. The company continued to exist into the 1950s.

== Gallery ==
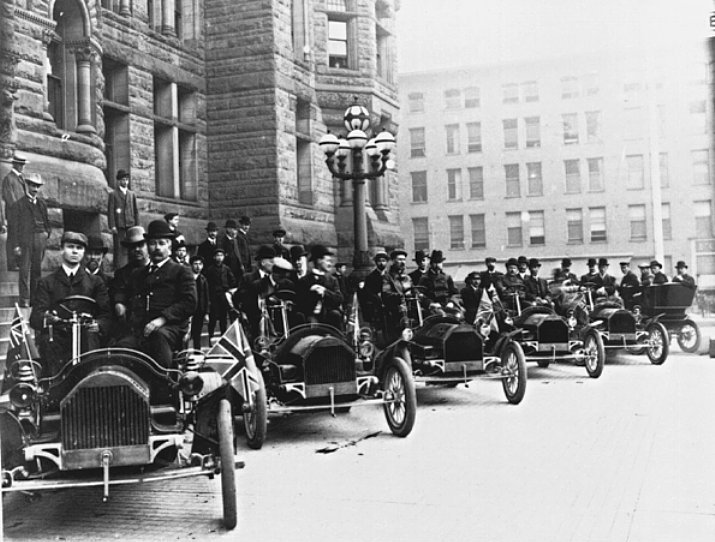
A row of Russell motor cars in front of Toronto city hall in 1909. Tommy Russell is seated in the driver's seat of the first car.

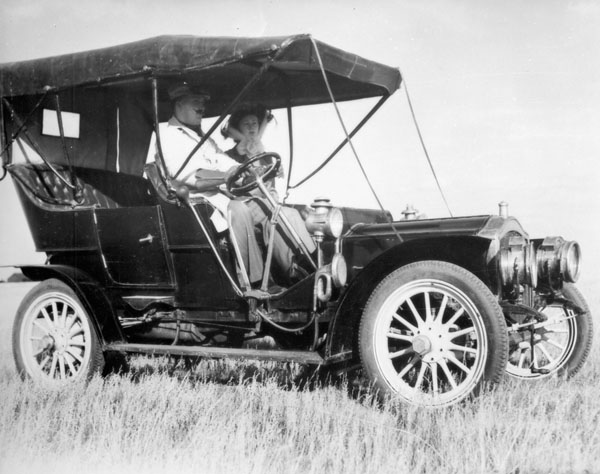
1908 Russell Motor Car

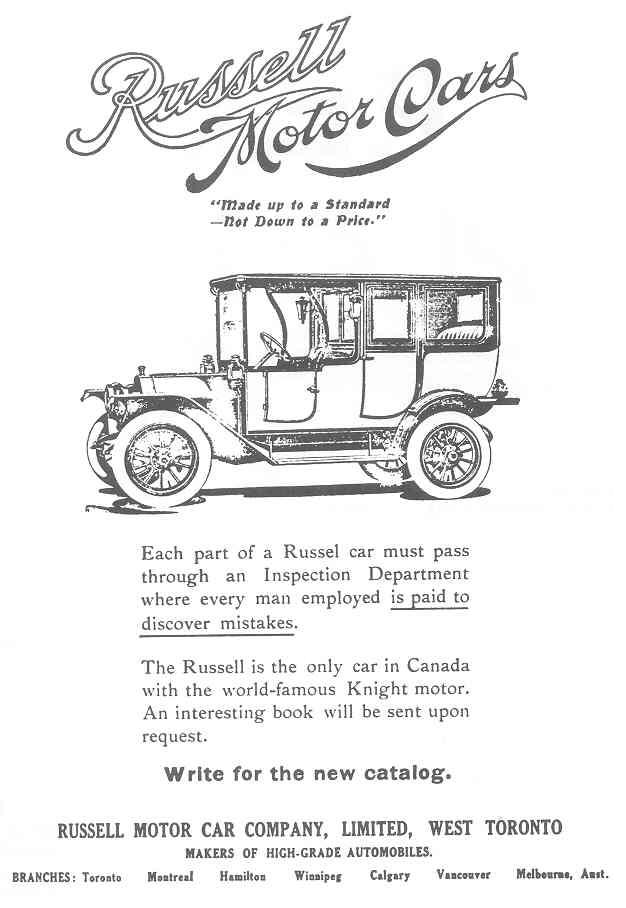
1910 Russell advertisement for Knight engine

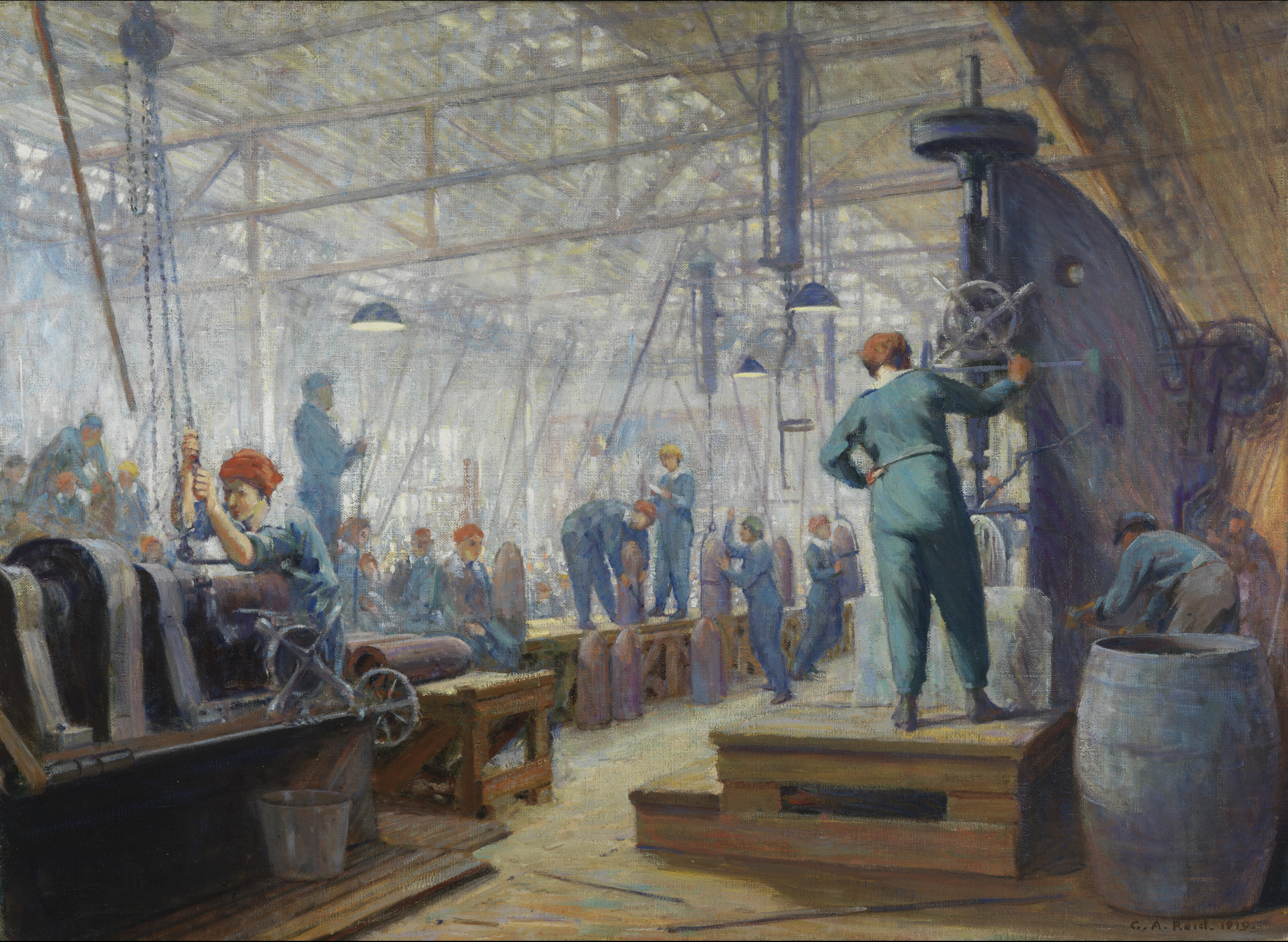
Women Operators, WWI at Russell factory by George Agnew Reid
