= Nova Scotia Carriage and Motor Car Company =

Nova Scotia Carriage and Motor Car Co., Ltd are established by McKay Brothers in 1912

The Nova Scotia Carriage and Motor Car Co., Ltd. was established in 1912 by brothers John W. and Daniel C. McKay. The company evolved from the brothers’ previous company, the Nova Scotia Carriage Co., which they had purchased in 1908 after moving to Kentville from Prince Edward Island. The Nova Scotia Carriage and Motor Car Co., Ltd. was created to manufacture and sell automobiles and horse-drawn carriages. The McKay car was the first production car in Nova Scotia.

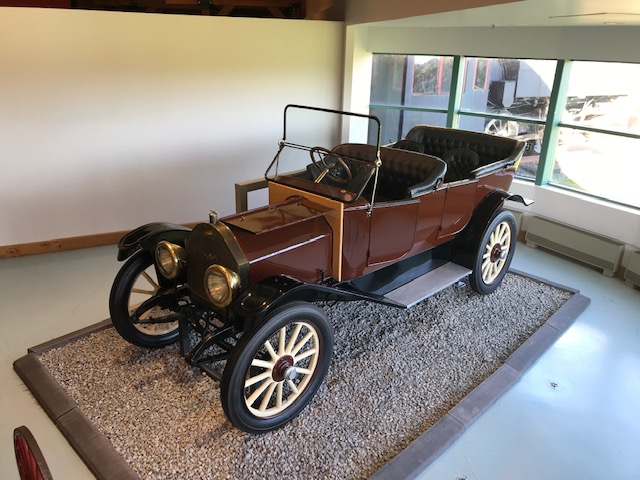
McKay 7-seater Touring

After establishing the Nova Scotia Carriage and Motor Car Co., Ltd., the brothers began constructing a second factory in Amherst. Daniel C. moved to Amherst to oversee the new factory after its completion in January 1913, while John W. stayed in Kentville to keep its factory functioning. In September 1914, the company ceased production of all automobiles. This was due to their lack of employees and low funds caused by the start of the first World War. The company continued manufacturing and selling horse-drawn carriages until 1915, when it was deeded to Nova Scotia Carriages Ltd. This company did not prosper during the war, and the mortgage was foreclosed in 1918.

== The Nova Scotia Carriage Co. ==
The Nova Scotia Carriage Co., Ltd. of Kentville, N.S. was liquidated by its shareholders in 1907 due to poor management. John and Daniel McKay rented the facilities the following year. The McKay brothers had previous experience working in their family carriage business in Prince Edward Island and had learned the trade from their father and had also been agents for agricultural implements.

In the first two years, the Nova Scotia Carriage Co. only manufactured and sold horse-drawn carriages. Consumer demand increased due to their carriages’ high quality and the promotions of their product at various events. John was the company’s general manager, and Daniel was the sales manager. In 1910, the brothers decided to manufacture and sell automobiles, and so they established the motor car department in their company. The company already had employees with most of the skills required to manufacture these motor cars, and the brothers engaged the then-president of the American Association of Automobile Engineers, E. T. Birdsall, to design the first McKay car, the McKay Penn “30”. This Automobile was designed after the Penn car, manufactured in Pennsylvania, from 1911 to 1913 with local modifications. The company built the car bodies for the Mckay Penn "30" in their factory and ordered the rest of the parts from a different manufacturer to assemble in-shop.

The Mckay Penn was introduced in March 1911, and by September 1911, twelve of these motor cars had been registered by their owners in various places around Nova Scotia. The Nova Scotia Carriage Co. furthered their promotional efforts by entering their motor car in hill climbs, races, and long-distance runs. During the summer of 1911, Daniel and A. L. Pelton, the company’s mechanical superintendent and car dealer, drove from Kentville to Regina, Saskatchewan in a Mckay Torpedo Roadster in a long-distance promotional run. The trip was successful and Daniel, as the sales manager, secured a large number of orders for the company’s motor cars and carriages. Later that year, at the Wolfville Exhibition of 1911, A. L. Pelton won first prize in the Automobile Show with his McKay Penn "30", and the second prize in the same show also went to another McKay Penn "30" owner.

By 1912 the factory had employed more than one hundred persons and was turning out twelve different models of automobiles, one hundred fifteen styles of carriages and twenty-two distinct types of sleighs. 25 cars had been made.

== Moving to Amherst ==
Although the Nova Scotia Carriage Co. was popular, they did not make enough money to meet their needs. The company had spent a lot of money to establish their motor car department by adding more rooms in their factory and hiring more employees to keep up with their automobile production. The town of Kentville decided in 1910 by an Act of Legislature to exempt the Nova Scotia Carriage Co. from paying municipal taxes, excluding water and sewer, for the next 10 years as long as the factory in Kentville stayed in active production. Four months later the Town Council also voted to give the Nova Scotia Carriage Co. a bonus of $5000. The money was not enough for the company to be able to expand and produce more automobiles.

The McKay brothers decided to expand their company by negotiating with other towns in Nova Scotia, seeking aid in building a second factory. A real estate agent from Amherst, N. D. Ackles, approached them, emphasizing the importance of Amherst as a manufacturing and distribution center. The brothers sent a proposition to the Amherst Board of Trade, and they held some preliminary meetings. It was at this time that the Nova Scotia Carriage Co. and all its assets were sold to the Nova Scotia Carriage and Motor Car Co. in April 1912. In March 1912 the Nova Scotia Carriage and Motor Car Co., Ltd. was incorporated under the Nova Scotia Companies’ Act. A Board of Directors was established for the new company consisting of the two McKay brothers, four Amherst business and industry owners, four Halifax men, and two others from out-of-province. The Nova Scotia Carriage and Motor Car Co., Ltd. was moving to Amherst.

Construction of the Amherst factory began in the summer of 1912, while the Kentville factory continued to produce carriages and automobiles. The factory was 340' by 60' and four stories high. It was designed by the firm of Lockwood, Greene & Co., of Boston. A problem arose during the construction when the factory, and especially one corner of it, began to sink into the soil. The building’s foundations were reinforced. The corner where it had been sinking the most required concrete pins that went down about 30 feet into the ground. This problem delayed the construction and cost the company more money. As this was happening in Amherst, the Kentville factory had begun manufacturing trucks. When the Amherst factory was ready for occupation in January 1913, Daniel moved to Amherst to oversee it. John stayed at the Kentville factory. The brothers had shifted the automobile department over to the new factory, and by February 1913, there were only sleighs and horse-drawn carriages being manufactured in the Kentville factory. The Amherst factory was only manufacturing automobiles at this time as the factory’s construction had not yet been completed.

During a meeting with the Directors in February 1913, John formally requested to retire from his active connection to the company due to his ill health. The Directors accepted, and Daniel was made the general manager of the Nova Scotia Carriage and Motor Car Co., Ltd., along with still functioning as its sales manager. However, Daniel did not have the skills required to be a general manager, and it was difficult for him to manage the Kentville factory from his place in Amherst. In August 1913, new members were added to the Board of Directors, and Daniel was replaced as general manager but kept his place on the Board of Directors. The new manager, W. L. Baker, had previously been a banker and was adept at handling business plans. He moved to Amherst in November 1913 just as the Amherst factory’s construction was finally completed and equipment from the Kentville factory was shipped to the new factory. By the end of the year, machinery from the Kentville factory and the newly ordered machinery were installed and production of horse-drawn carriages and sleighs commenced.

== The End of the Company ==
News of the dawning war in the winter of 1913-1914 had many Nova Scotian businesses in poor economic conditions. The town of Amherst had many living in poverty due to the lack of trade and industrial activity. The Nova Scotia Carriage and Motor Car Co., Ltd. had declining amounts of sales, so in February 1914 the company advertised their carriages as being on sale for anywhere between 20% and 35% less than factory cost. By March 1914, their production of carriages and motor cars was steady and fast-paced, requiring workers to do double shifts.

During this push in production, the Nova Scotia Carriage and Motor Car Co., Ltd. was losing money. The company needed money to buy the parts for the automobiles, but they were not selling enough automobiles to make the money needed. Despite the efforts made to increase the production of carriages and automobiles, the company’s sales were dangerously low. During the summer of 1914, after World War One was announced, the Nova Scotia Carriage and Motor Car Co., Ltd. stopped manufacturing automobiles and the Kentville premises were deeded back to the McKay brothers. In 1915, the company reverted to carriage and sleigh production building 1,800 carriages and 420 sleighs, then the company was deeded to Nova Scotia Carriages Ltd. Horse-drawn carriages were not popular at this time, and Nova Scotia Carriages Ltd. did not prosper. Finally, in 1918, the Prudential Trust Company foreclosed the mortgage.

After the mortgage foreclosed on the property of the Nova Scotia Carriage and Motor Car Co., Ltd., John bought the Kentville property and sold portions of the land and buildings to multiple different people, and eventually the entire property was bought back and resold to Kentville Woodworkers Ltd. In 1925 the Kentville factory was destroyed in a fire, and the same happened to the Amherst factory in 1964. There is little known about what else the McKay brothers did after the end of their company.

There are very few McKay Automobiles left, but one reproduction of a 7- Seater Touring automobile is part of a display at The Nova Scotia Museum of Industry in Stellarton, Nova Scotia, and a restored McKay Roadster is on display at the Canadian Automotive Museum in Oshawa, Ontario.
