= HTT Pléthore =

Automobile company

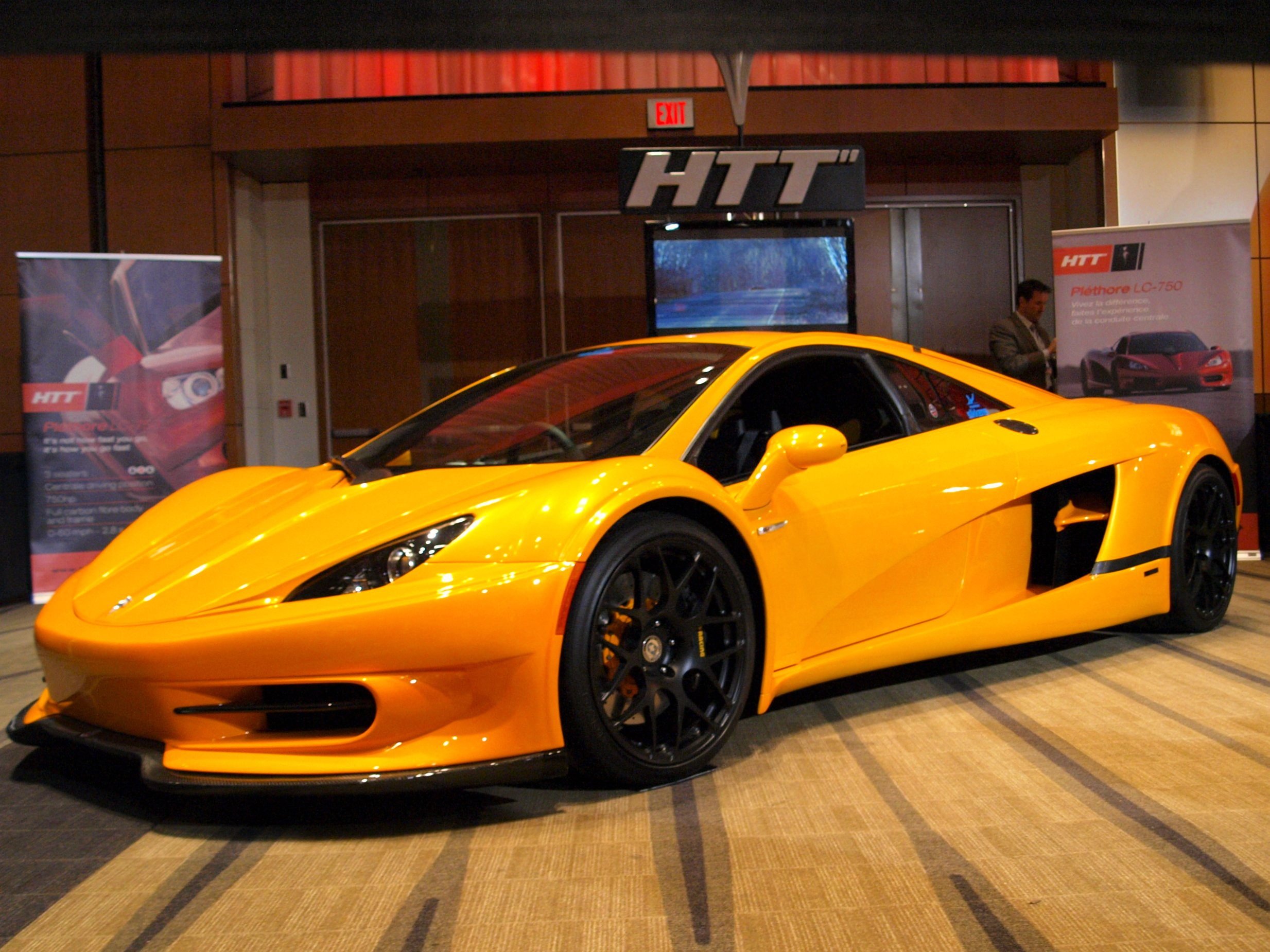

Overview
- Manufacturer: HTT Automobile
- Production: 2010 - present
- Assembly: Saint-Eustache, Quebec, Canada
- Designer: Luc Chartrand

Body and chassis
- Class: Sports car (S)
- Body style: 2-door 3-seater, central driving position coupe
- Layout: Mid engine, rear-wheel drive
- Doors: Scissor

Powertrain
- Engine: 6.2 L Pratt & Miller Corvette ZR1-based supercharged V8 (LC 750); 8.3 L Viper-based naturally-aspirated V10 (LC 1300)
- Transmission: 6-speed Tremec manual

Dimensions
- Wheelbase: 294 cm (115.7 in)
- Length: 452 cm (178.0 in)
- Width: 222 cm (87.4 in)
- Height: 112 cm (44.1 in)
- Curb weight: 1,134 kg (2,500 lb)

The HTT Pléthore is a Canadian sports car, developed and produced by the Canadian automotive company HTT Automobile in Quebec, Canada.

== History ==
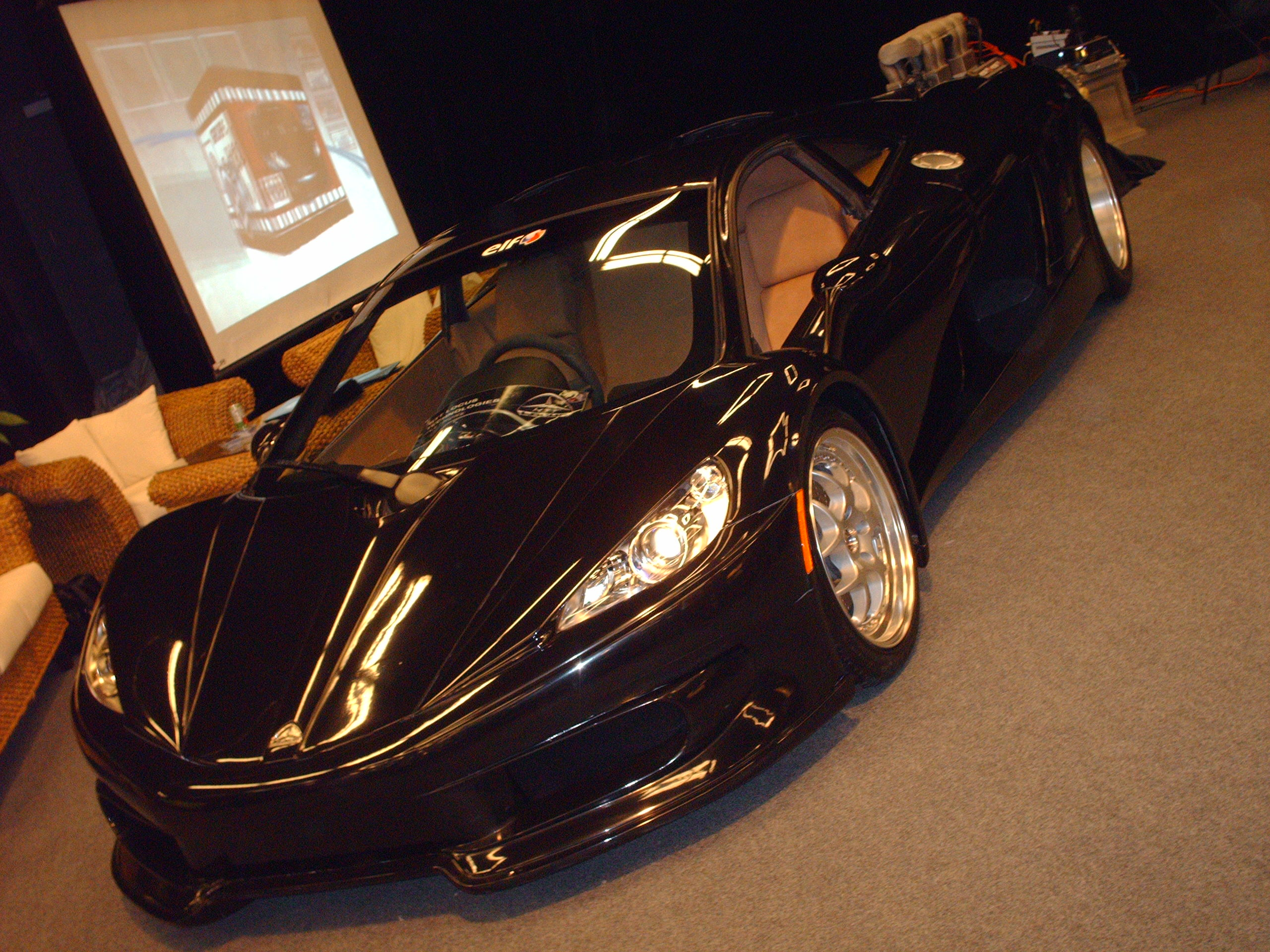
Locus Plethore at the 2007 Montreal International Auto Show

The HTT Pléthore LC 750 debuted at the 2007 Montreal International Auto Show as a pre-production prototype under the name "Locus Pléthore", under the supervision of Luc Chartrand. It has a supercharged 6.2L V8 LS9 with 750 hp (559 kW) and 655 lb⋅ft (888 N⋅m) of torque, or an optional high performance homemade V8 engine with 1,100 hp (820 kW). This engine is supported by Pratt & Miller and based on the supercharged V8 from the Corvette ZR1. The chassis and body are made entirely out of carbon fibre, with no engine subframe, resulting in the chassis being exceptionally rigid. The car will weigh approximately 1,089 kg (2,401 lb) and, if mated to the 1,100 hp (820 kW) engine, will have a power-to-weight ratio equivalent to that of a Formula One race car. Two prototypes were constructed, the second suggests a center seating position, previously featured in cars such as the McLaren F1, 1966 Ferrari 365 P prototype, and the 1969 Bizzarrini Manta Concept. HTT Automobile planned to custom build a limited lifetime production run of 99 Pléthores.

=== Debut ===
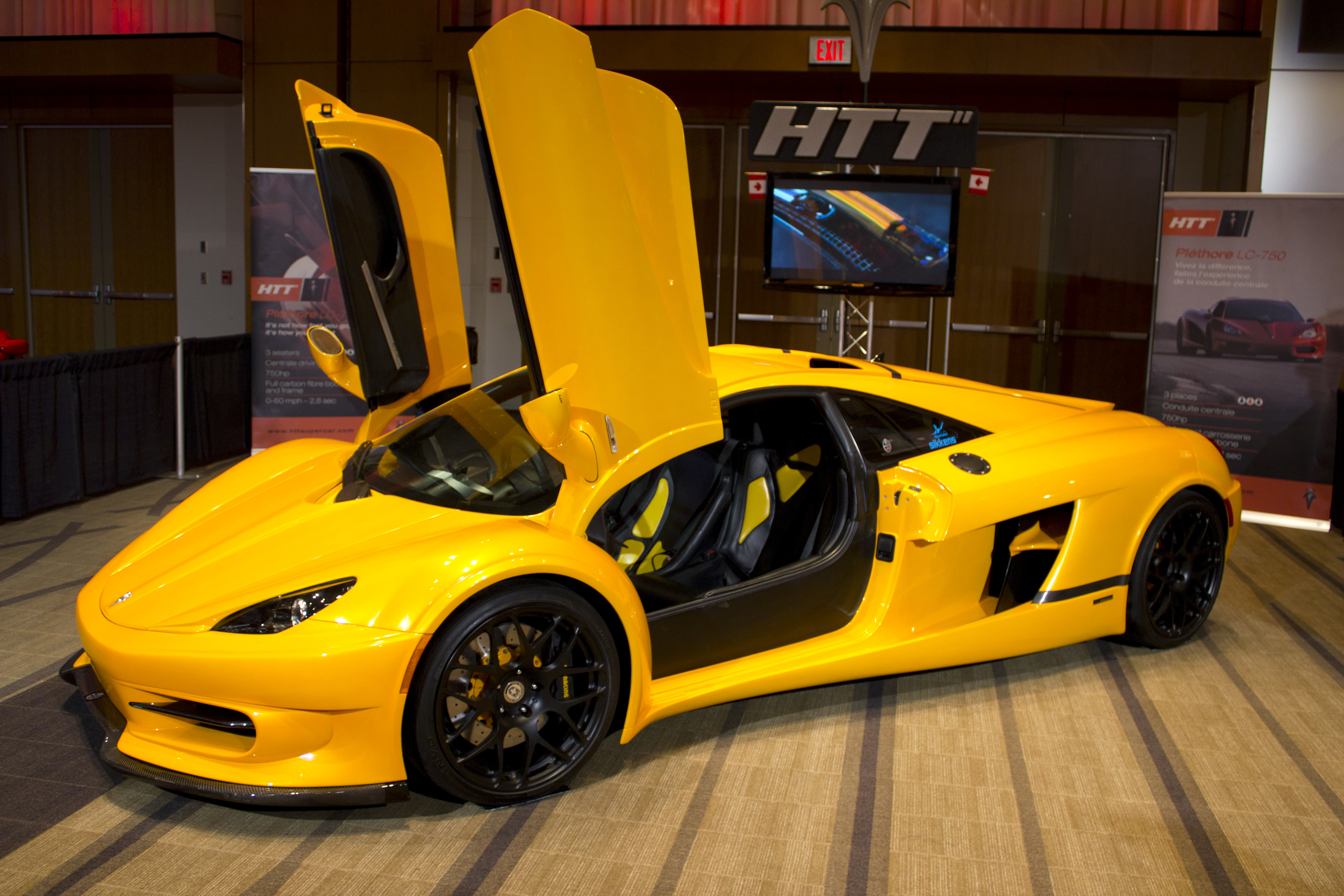
HTT Plethore LC 750 with its doors open upward

On February 16, 2011, the Pléthore was featured on CBC's Dragon's Den. Sébastien Forest & Carl Descoteaux put forward their pitch for Canada's first supercar, asking $1.5 million for 20% of their company. Subject to completion of due diligence, W. Brett Wilson and Robert Herjavec offered to become partners in the company by purchasing 20% of the company for $1 million, providing an additional $500,000 in loans, and acquiring the rights to purchase 3 Pléthores at cost, including the first car to be sold in Canada. This deal fell through after the transmission failed during a test drive, however, an unidentified party stepped in after their television appearance with the necessary funding. HTT planned to make 6-7 cars a year, with 6 cars registered as pre-sold. The HTT Pléthore also made an appearance in the video games Asphalt 8: Airborne and Asphalt Legends.

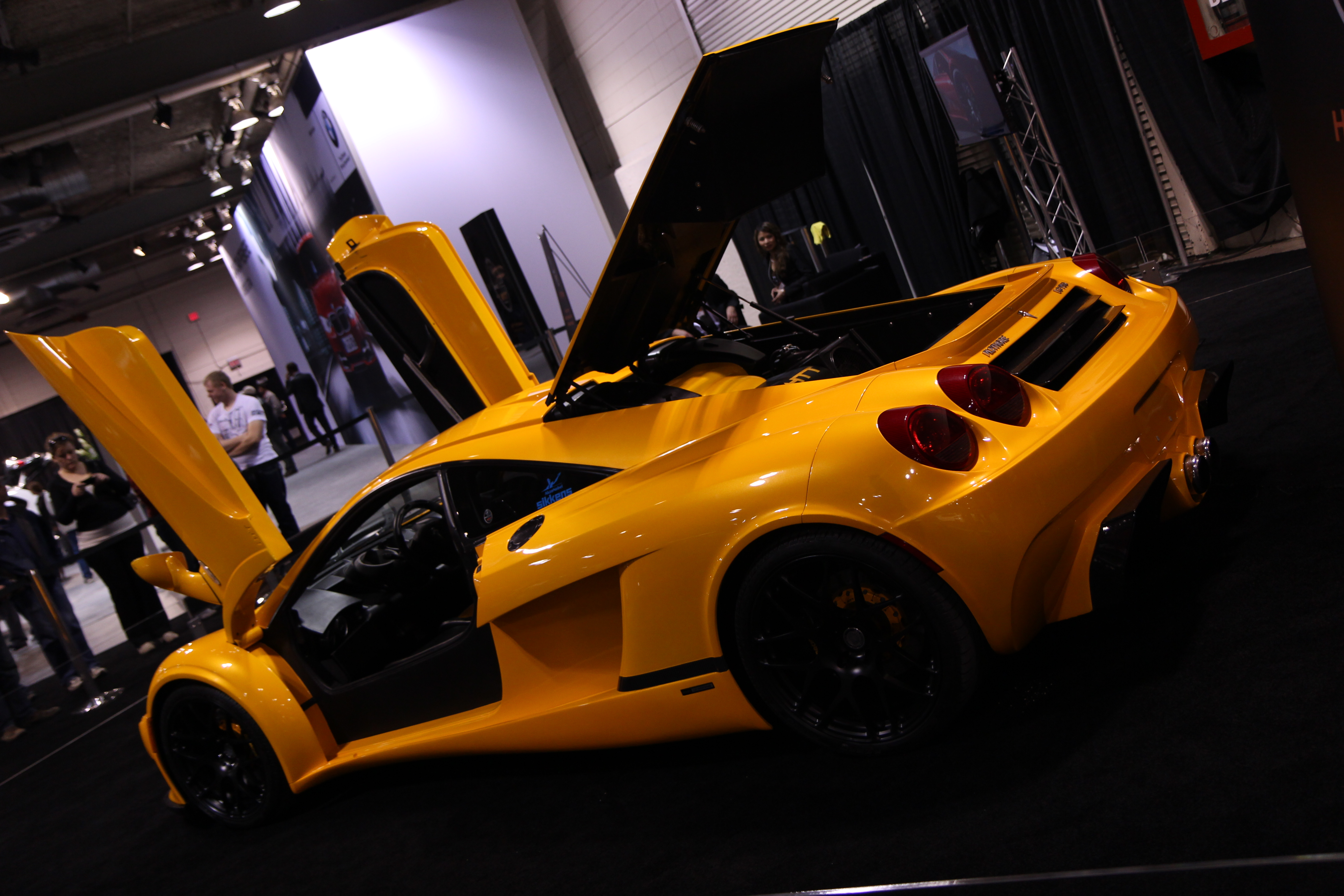
HTT Pléthore rear 3/4 view

=== Resurgence ===
In 2013, the HTT Pléthore was revamped to the previous model with an even more powerful engine. HTT called it the LC-1300, for its supposed 1,300 horsepower 8.3L V10 taken from the Dodge Viper.
