= Anhut Motor Car Company =

Defunct American motor vehicle manufacturer

- Company type: Automobile manufacturing
- Industry: Automotive
- Genre: Touring cars
- Founded: 1909
- Headquarters: Detroit, Michigan (headquarters); Chatham, Ontario (factory)
- Products: Vehicles

The Anhut Motor Car Company was an American brass era automobile manufacturer, based in Detroit, Michigan, from 1909 until 1910.

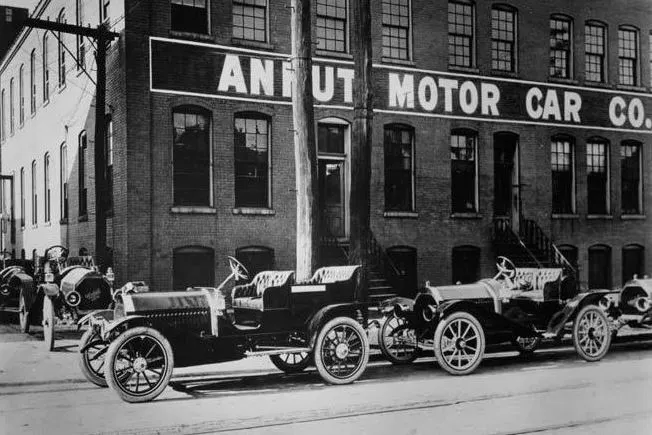
1910 image of the Anhut factory (Anhut six toy tonneau behind it a Anhut six Roadster)

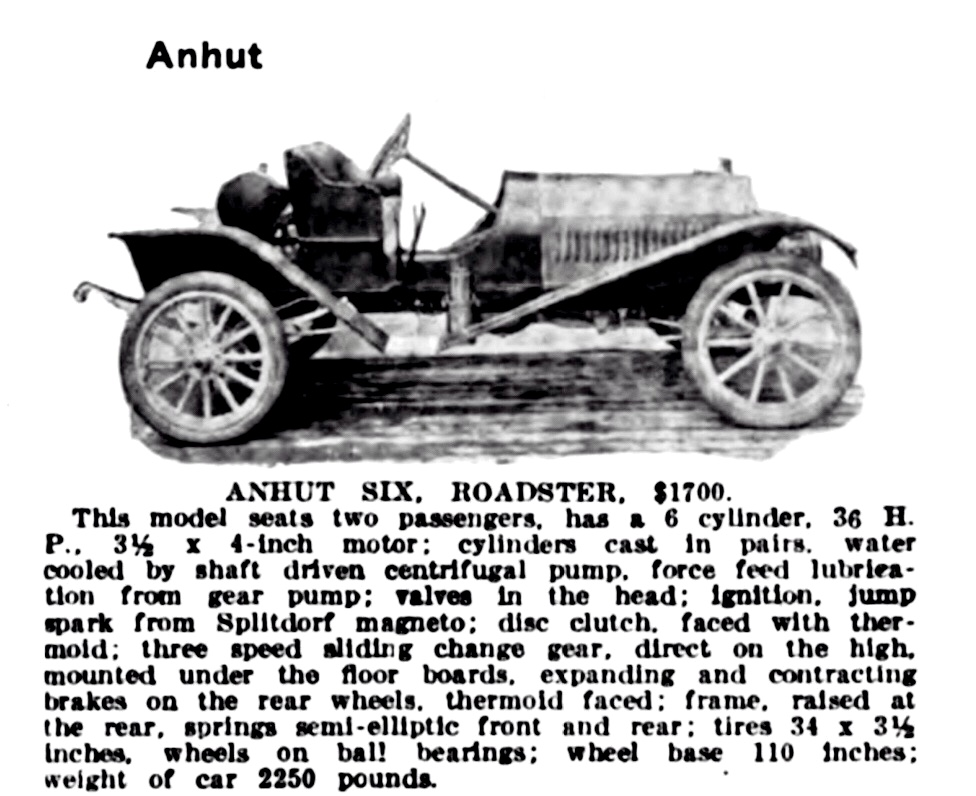
Anhut six Roadster (1910)

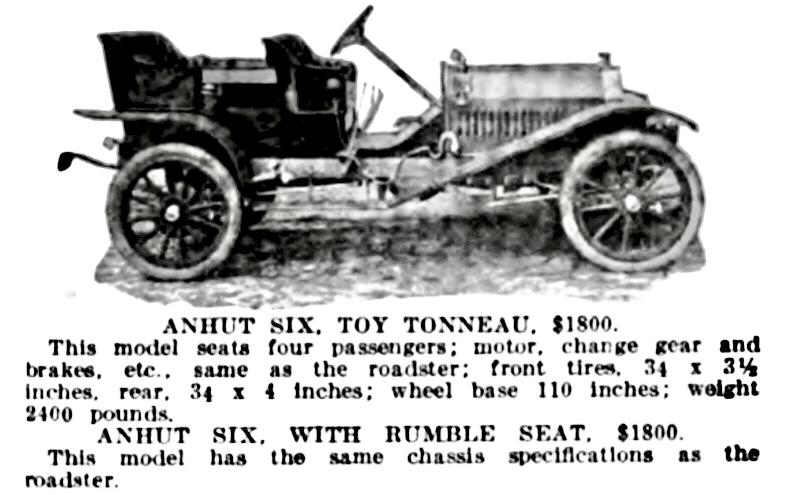
Anhut six toy tonneau (1910)

== History ==
The company was founded by Michigan State Senator John Anhut and Detroit mayor Philip Breitmeyer, who became vice-president of the company. It was capitalized at US$150,000.

Organized in October 1909, the factory was located at 510 Howard Street in Detroit.

The car was known as the Anhut 6, and used a Brownell six-cylinder overhead valve engine of 3.7L displacement, producing 36 hp (27 kW; 36 PS), with a 110 in (2,800 mm) wheelbase. Three body styles were offered: a two-seat roadster at US$1700, and a four-seat toy tonneau and a four-seat rumble seat roadster, each at US$1800.

Sales were promising, and the company purchased the factory of the bankrupt Chatham Motor Car Company in 1910, continuing to manufacture badge engineered Chathams under its own brand for the Canadian market.

Anhut relinquished control of the company in order to concentrate on his upcoming re-election to the Michigan State Senate. The company was taken over by factory superintendent HC Barnes, who re-organised the company into the Barnes Motor Car Company in September 1910.

Barnes planned to build a six-cylinder car for $2,250 and a four-cylinder for $1,400, but the company was bankrupt by November 1910. In January 1911, the physical remains of the company was sold to the Autoparts Company of Detroit, who specialised in buying up the assets of automobile companies that had gone out of business.

== See also ==
- Brass Era car
