= Hyslop and Ronald =

Canadian automotive manufacturer

- Industry: Automotive
- Genre: Fire engines
- Fate: Acquired by Chatham Motor Car Company
- Headquarters: Hamilton, Ontario, Canada
- Products: Fire engines

Hyslop and Ronald was a Canadian brass era steam fire engine manufacturer, based in Hamilton, Ontario.

They established a factory in a two-story building on Adelaide Street, about halfway between McGregor Creek, and King Street.

The factory was taken over by Chatham Motor Car Company in 1906.

The company also produced other machinery.
