= Jean de Brabant =

Canadian lawyer, writer and businessman

- Born: September 20, 1938 (age 87); Montreal, Quebec
- Known for: Les Atriums; Tropics North / Film documentaries on families

Jean de Brabant (born 20 September 1938) is a Canadian lawyer and entrepreneur.

== Les Atriums and Tropics North ==
From 1976 to 1990 Brabant was engaged in real estate development in Montreal, partnering with Claude Laporte to purchase the bankrupt department store "Dupuis Frères" and converting it into a 215,000 square foot office building featuring two 8 story atria, with waterfalls and flowering plants. In 1986 Brabant conceived and began development of "Tropics North", ", a 12 story condominium, a distinctive characteristic of which is that all the apartments possess large terraces opening on to a 12 story high green-house, building designed by Tolchinsky & Goodz Architects with the gardens conceived by Herb Ramsaier, (formerly chief landscape architect of Disney), to recreate a Hawaiian environment on the banks of the St. Lawrence. The greenhouse features palm trees, bougainvillea and other tropical plants as well as a lagoon and waterfalls.

The innovations that Tropics North and Les Atriums used were influential in the design of the Montreal Biodome.

== Film Documentaries on families ==
Beginning in 1992, Brabant started producing film biographies, mostly for families, in which one or two family members narrate the story of their family. These films, typically lasting between two and four hours are generally illustrated with appropriate pictures and film clips. Families filmed include those of Celia Franca, founder of the National Ballet of Canada, the poet, Irving Layton, Charles Bronfman, former vice-Chair of Seagram’s, Guylaine Saucier and Jean Pouliot, respectively former Chairs of the Canadian Broadcasting Corporation and the TQS television chain; Yves Fortier formerly President of the Canadian Bar Association and the London Court of International Arbitration; formerly Governor of the Hudson’s Bay Company and Chair of Alcan Inc.; Roger Landry, former Publisher of La Presse; Lynton (Red) Wilson, former Chair of Bell Canada Enterprises; Heward Stikeman, founder of Stikeman Elliot, a leading Canadian law firm; William Stinson, former Chair of Canadian Pacific Railway and William Turner, former vice-Chair of the Davos Economic Conference.
