= Gray–Dort Motors =

Gray-Dort Motors was a Canadian automobile manufacturing company in Chatham, Ontario, which operated from 1915 to 1925.

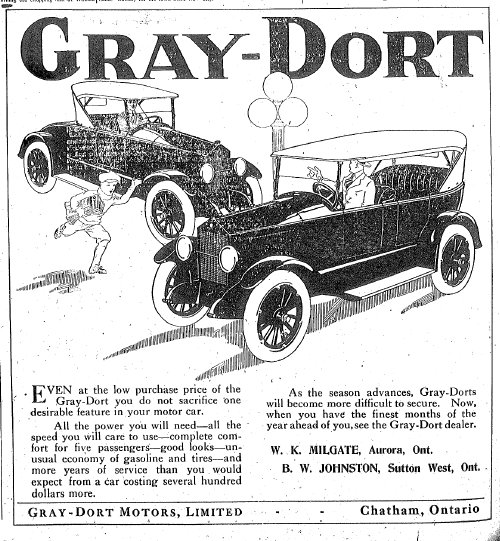
Gray-Dort newspaper ad from 1921

== Formation ==
Gray-Dort Motors started as the carriage works of William Gray & Sons Company Ltd., founded in 1855 by William Gray. In the mid-1900s, William's son and president of the company, Robert Gray, began to build car bodies for the Ford factory in Walkerville, Ontario, until 1912.

In 1915, Robert Gray obtained the Canadian rights to manufacture the Dort automobile from manufacturer Josiah Dallas Dort, in Flint, Michigan. Later that year, Gray-Dort Motors Ltd. was formed. Gray-Dort produced two models in its first year of operation: the Model 4 roadster and the Model 5 touring car.

Throughout its lifetime, Gray-Dort manufactured around 26,000 automobiles. During this period, they also produced bodies for the locally built Chatham automobiles. Three body styles were offered: the tourer, coupe and the sedan.

== Dissolution ==
In 1923, after several years of successful but stressful business, Josiah Dallas Dort left the business. A few months later, Dort died during a golf session. As the company's easy access to U.S. mechanical parts abruptly came to a close, Gray-Dort Motors began to lose money. They scrambled to find another U.S.-based partner to no avail. The last few years of the business were spent liquidating assets.

== See also ==
- Dort Motor Car Company
