= Flint Cultural Center =

Coordinates: 43°1′21″N 83°40′44″W

- campus
- The campus of the Flint Cultural Center
- Country: USA
- State: Michigan
- County: Genesee
- City: Flint

Area
  - Total: 13.37 ha (33.0 acres)
- Website: www.flintcultural.org

The Flint Cultural Center (FCC) is a campus of cultural, scientific, and artistic institutes located in Flint, Michigan, United States. The institutions located on the grounds of the FCC are the Flint Institute of Arts, Flint Institute of Music, Sloan Museum, Gloria Coles Flint Public Library, Buick Gallery & Research Center, Robert T. Longway Planetarium, Whiting Auditorium, and Flint Repertory Theatre. The campus and some institutions are owned by Flint Cultural Center Corporation.

The campus is 33 acres in size and is owned by the Flint Cultural Center Corporation. The Gloria Cole’s Flint Public Library owns its own building.

Flint Institute of Music (FIM) and Flint Institute of Arts are non-profits independent from the Flint Cultural Center Corporation, but lease their buildings from the cultural center. FIM consists of the Flint School of Performing Arts, Flint Symphony Orchestra and Flint Repertory Theatre.

== History ==
=== Development ===
The City of Flint School District in 1920 purchased the old Oak Grove sanitarium and 60 adjoining acres plus later added other private lots. In 1946, the College and Cultural Center campus was started by C.S. Mott after he learned of University of Michigan President Alexander Grant Ruthven indicated the possibility of forming university branches in other areas of Michigan. Mott pledged a match towards developing a four-year college if Flint city voters pass a $7-million bond issue, which they did. Plus Mott donated land, 32 acres in the early 1950s and additional 6.25 acres in 1955 for a new campus. The first building constructed in 1954 for the new college campus was Ballenger Field House. With UM talks dragging on, Flint Community Junior College moved to the campus in 1955.

In the early 1950s, Flint Journal editor Michael A. Gorman felt that educational and cultural opportunities should be available to residents given its status as a factory town. Gorman was involved with an informal group that met at his home on Calumet to play cards and discussion Flint's future. This group was thus called the Calumet Club. The club changed into the Committee of Sponsors for the Flint College and Cultural Development. Leadership of the Committee was: executive director Robert T. Robison, president Robert T. Longway, Buick vice president and assistant general manager from 1929–32, first vice president F.A. "Dutch" Bower, Buick's chief engineer from 1929–36 and executive committee chairman Gorman. Honorary chairman were Mott, GM president Harlow H. Curtice and retired (1929) Buick engineer Enos A. DeWaters.

The Flint Board of Education was chosen by the founders to oversee the cultural campus and its reserve funds. The reserve funds were raised to go towards annual operational and maintenance costs. However, these funds were insufficient to upgrade buildings or fund new programs.

The committee set a goal of $25 million for their initial fundraising goal. In honor of its 50-millionth car, General Motors contributed $3 million in starter funds. Starting in 1954, donation was open to the public but in $25,000 increments. 400 individuals and 100 corporations, businesses and organizations donated at this sponsor level with most giving over the minimum. The Charles Stewart Mott Foundation shifted its annual gift, started in 1928, from the Flint Institute of Arts to the Flint Cultural Center.

In 1958, Gorman died before the campus was finished. Cultural center buildings did start to open that year while the last of the original buildings finished in 1967 and were named after automotive pioneers.

=== Operating ===
In 1973, the Sloan Museum started hold its annual Sloan Auto Fair. The Committee of Sponsors continued fundraising until the 1990s, but did the bulk of their fundraising in its first ten years. The Flint Cultural Center Corporation was established in 1992 after the Flint Board of Education and the Committee of Sponsors had done some strategic planning with community participation. At first, the corporation managed the grounds on behalf of the school district, under a lease management agreement, and was governing body for Longway Planetarium, Sloan Museum and Whiting Auditorium.

A major capital and endowment campaign to support the FCCC, the FIA and FIM was started in 1995 and raised over $33 million. While $7.1 million was used to renovate The Whiting, a project completed in 1999, the remained where placed into endowment funds. Longway and Bower were connect via a $2.65-million 2000 addition consisting of classroom and rehearsal space.

Beginning in 2010, the Charles Stewart Mott Foundation made annual grants over $3 million, of split between the Corporation and the two other private Cultural Center organizations.

In September 2013, the FCCC purchased the Sarvis Center and Central Kitchen from the Flint Community Schools for $150,000 despite some community opposition thinking that the price was too low and there was no other bidders. For the 2018 Sloan Auto Fair, it was moved from the center campus to Genesee County Parks' Crossroads Village and Huckleberry Railroad given issue with Flint Institute of Arts' expansion.

On May 14, 2018, the center corporation submitted a request to vacate parts of three public streets on the campus. This a preliminary move to make way for a possible arts and science focused charter school. Grounding breaking on the K-8 charter school, Flint Cultural Center Academy, took place on June 26, 2018 with expectations that the school be open for the 2019-2020 school year.

At the August 2018 primary election, Genesee County voters approved a 10-year arts millage that the bulk of the proceeds would go to Flint Cultural Center institutes. Additional Flint groups receiving fixed funding are Friends of Berston Fieldhouse and the New McCree Theatre. The Greater Flint Arts Council grants out the remaining funds to other Genesee County art organizations through Share Art Genesee.

The Flint Institute of Music's Flint Youth Theatre changed its name to Flint Repertory Theatre ("The Rep") on August 13, 2018 to become a regional theatre while Flint Youth Theatre would become a program of the Rep's education department.

== Flint Cultural Center Corporation ==
Flint Cultural Center Corporation
- Type: Nonprofit corporation
- Founded: (1992)
- Headquarters: Flint, Michigan
- Key people: Mark Sinila (COO); Todd Slisher; (Executive Director, Sloan-Longway); Jarret M. Haynes; (Executive Director, The Whiting)
- Revenue: $6 million (2014 budget)
- Number of employees: 50 full-time; 75-100 part-time; (2014)
- Divisions: Flint Cultural Center Academy; Sloan-Longway; The Whiting
- Website: fcccorp.org

Flint Cultural Center Corporation (FCCC) is a non-profit corporation that manages the Flint Cultural Center. The FCCC is responsible for all aspects of governance and operation of Longway Planetarium, Sloan Museum, and The Whiting.

The Flint Cultural Center Corporation established in 1992 after the Flint Board of Education and the Committee of Sponsors had done some strategic planning with community participation. At first, the corporation managed the grounds on behalf of the school district, under a lease management agreement, and was governing body for Longway Planetarium, Sloan Museum and Whiting Auditorium.

The Flint City School district transferred in July 2003 the Flint Youth Theatre program to the FCCC. Except for the Flint Public Library and the Sarvis Center, the Cultural Center campus was deeded over to the corporation in October 2004. In 2005, former Citizens Bank president Howard Gay established a family foundation supporting the Flint Cultural Center Corporation.

In September 2013, the FCCC purchased the Sarvis Center and Central Kitchen from the Flint Community Schools for $150,000 despite some community opposition thinking that the price was too low and there was no other bidders. In 2018, the corporation started its public charter school, Flint Cultural Center Academy.

=== Sloan-Longway ===
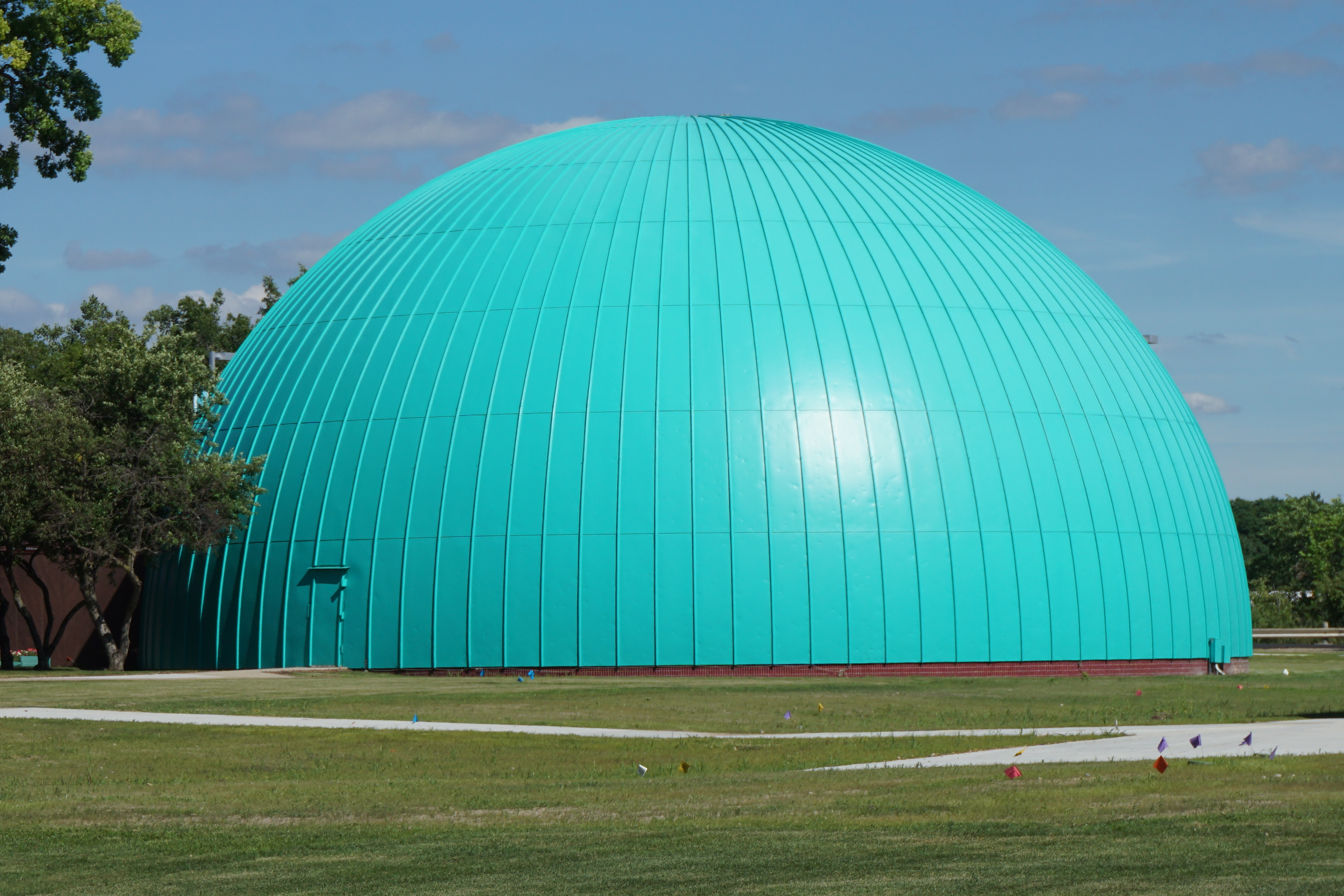
Robert T. Longway Planetarium

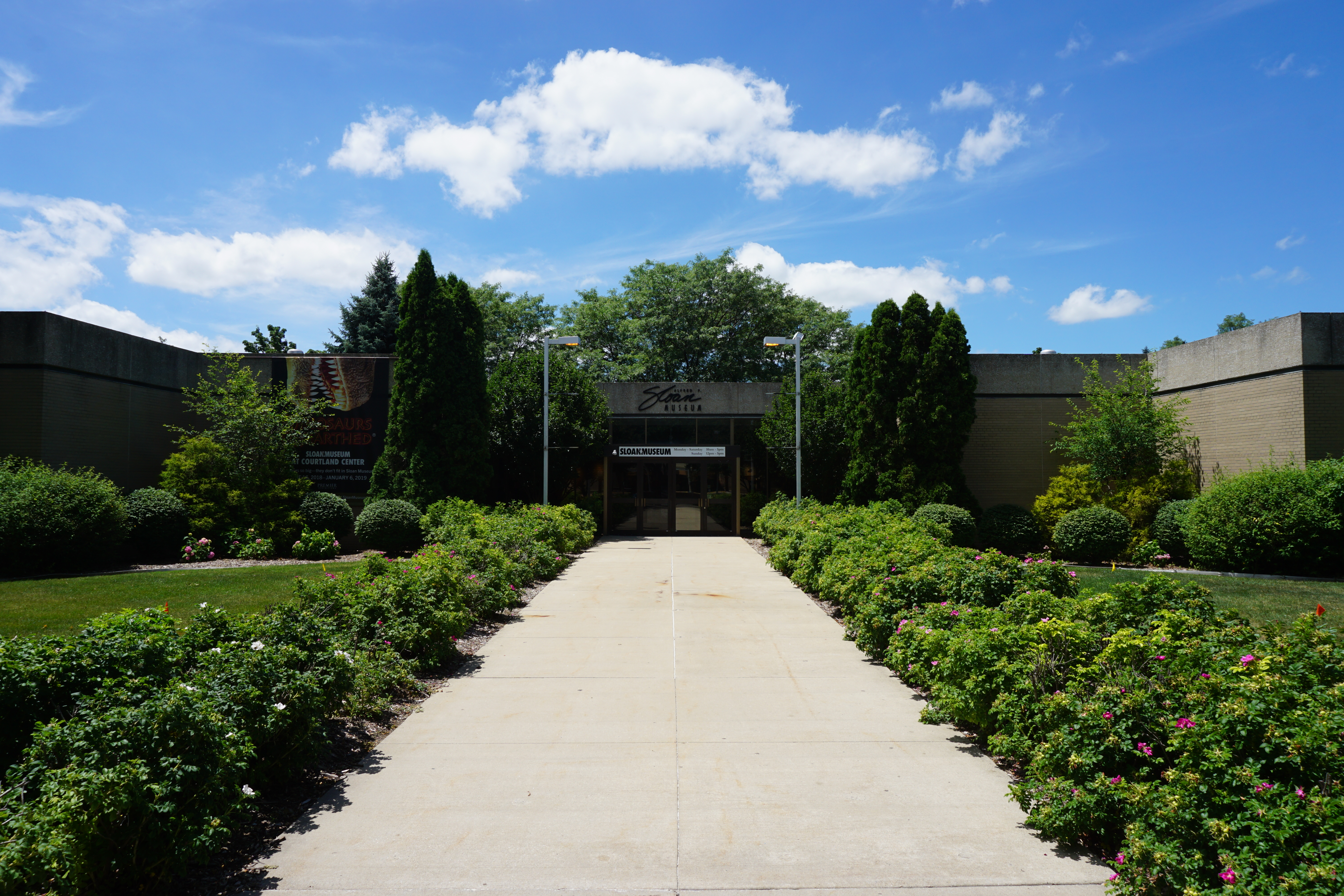
Sloan Museum

Sloan-Longway, stylized as Sloan*Longway, is an operational division of the Flint Cultural Center Corporation. The division operates three venues Alfred P. Sloan Museum, Robert T. Longway Planetarium and Buick Automotive Gallery and Research Center. The Sloan Museum Automotive Collection consist of 100 vehicles some of which rotate between being on display at the Sloan Museum and the Buick Automotive Gallery. In 2004, the Flint Cultural Center Corporation formed the Sloan-Longway division from the operation of Sloan Museum, Longway Planetarium and Buick Automotive Gallery.

On November 16 and 19, 2012, the Flint Journal donated and transferred its archive to the Sloan Museum. The papers' records were placed in the museum's Sloan Archives at the Buick Gallery building. In 2010, fundraising began for a portable dome theater so that planetarium style presentations can be taken to local schools. By 2013, the Portable Dome Theater was purchased. Its first year (2013/2014 school year) of travel cost were partially covered by a grant from Community Foundation of Greater Flint's Flint Community Fund, Sarah E. Warner Endowment for the Arts Fund and Jean Simi Fund for the Arts to the Flint Classroom Support Fund.

=== The Whiting ===
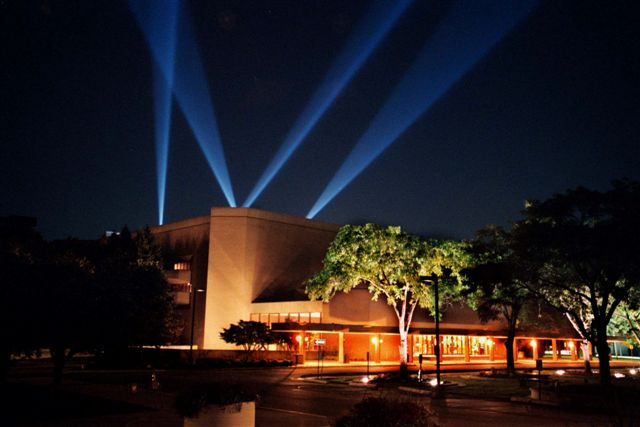

The Whiting is an operational division of the Flint Cultural Center Corporation that operates The Whiting auditorium and the downtown Capitol Theatre.

In 1993-94, the corporation launched the Showcase Series at the Whiting Auditorium with five shows in the lineup. The Spotlight Series, formerly the Showcase Series, had 27 shows in 2008. A major capital and endowment campaign to support the FCCC allocated $7.1 million to renovate The Whiting, a project completed in 1999.

In April 2015, the Uptown Reinvestment Corp. purchased the downtown Capitol Theatre from Troy Farah. Uptown Reinvestment announced on October 21, 2015 that they had partnered with The Whiting with Uptown restoring the theater and The Whiting managing its operations. On December 7, 2017, the theater reopened.

== Buildings ==
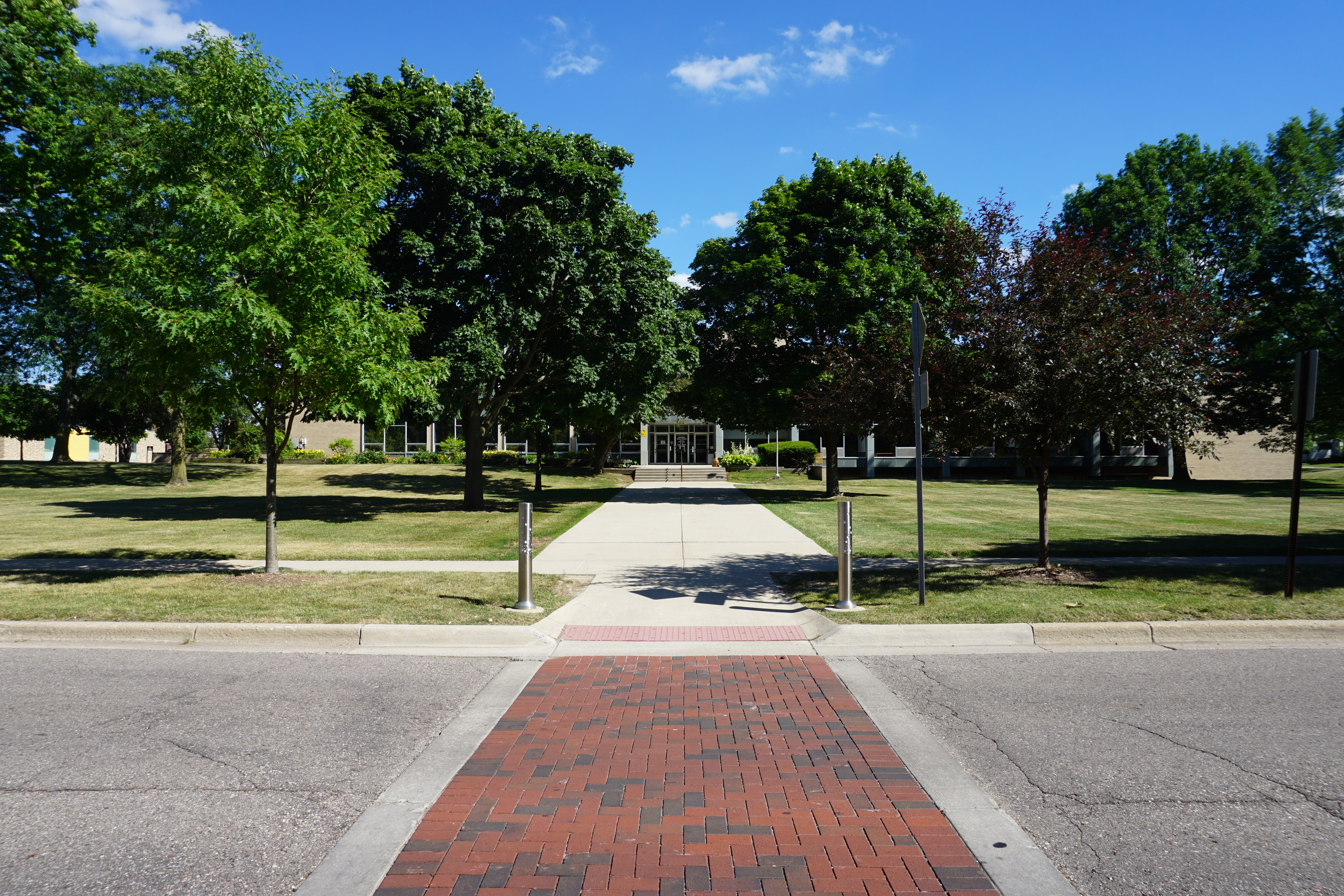
Flint Public Library

Original (constructed 1958-1967)

- F.A. Bower Theater
- Flint Institute of Arts, formerly Enos A. and Sarah DeWaters Art Center, renovated through the FIA organizational fundraising
- J. Dallas Dort Music Center
- Flint Cultural Center Academy (2019)
- Flint Public Library
- Robert T. Longway Planetarium is a building run by Sloan-Longway division of the Flint Cultural Center. The planetarium had an April 9, 1957 ground-breaking ceremony and was built for $600,000 with the interior geodesic dome designed by inventor/architect Buckminster Fuller. Its first public show was on June 29, 1958. From 1999-2000, an expansion and renovation connected it to Bower Theater. C.S. Mott Foundation was the primary funder of this project that added a lobby, a science classroom, Digistar II star projector, laser equipment and new seating.
- Alfred P. Sloan Museum: The building was the former president and chairman of the board of General Motors. The museum opened in November 1966 and temporarily closed in December 2018 for renovation and expansion.

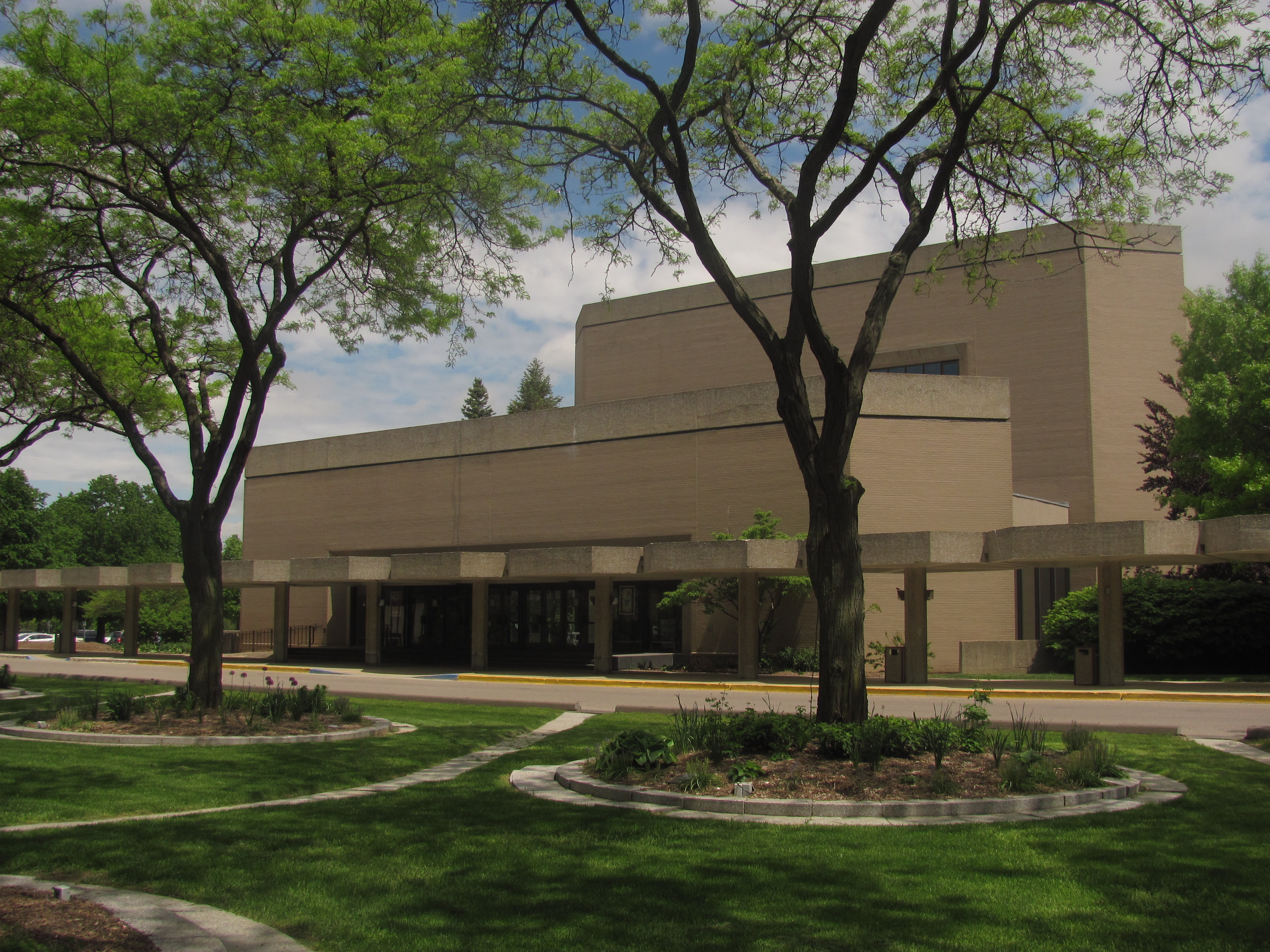
The Whiting

- The Whiting, formerly James H. Whiting Auditorium, renovated 1997 to 1999

Additional

- Buick Automotive Gallery and Research Center, closed after February 25, 2018 for facility repairs. Cars were moved to Courtland Center mall.
