= William Ballinger =

William Ballinger may refer to:

- William Pitt Ballinger (1825–1888), American lawyer and statesman in Texas
- Bill Ballinger (born 1945), Canadian politician
- Bill S. Ballinger (1912–1980), American writer and screenwriter

== See also ==
- Bill Ballenger (born 1941), Michigan politician and political newsletter editor
- William S. Ballenger Sr. (1866–1951), one of the organizers and owners of the Buick Motor Company
