= William Ballenger =

William Ballenger may refer to:

- William S. Ballenger Sr. (1866–1951), American businessman and co-founder of the Buick Motor Company
- Bill Ballenger (William S. Ballenger III, born 1941), American politician and grandson of William S. Ballenger Sr.
