= Metz Company =

Early automobile manufacturer

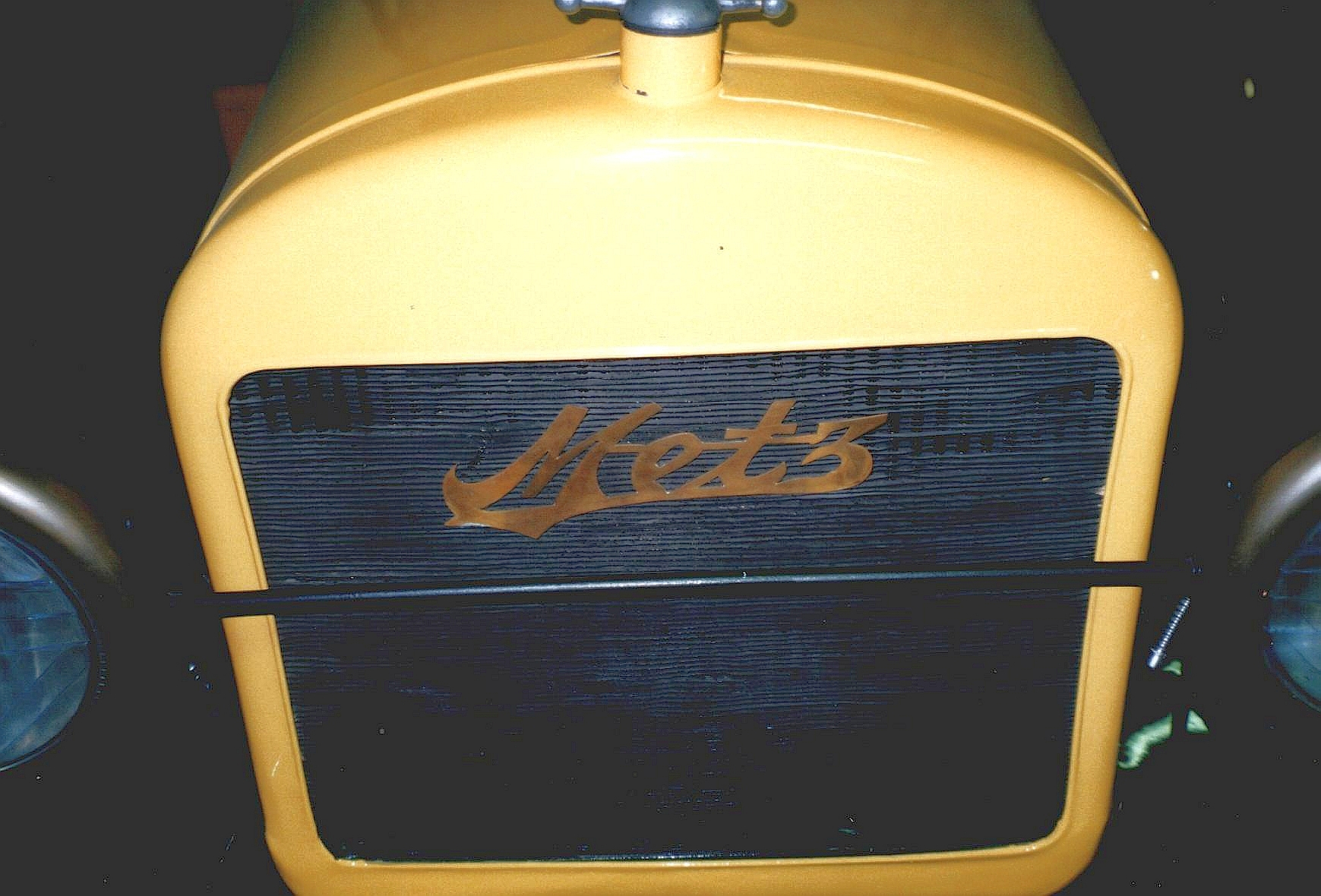
- 1917 Metz 25 Radiator Emblem
- Formerly: Waltham Manufacturing Company
- Type: Automobile manufacturer
- Founded: 1909; 117 years ago
- Founder: Charles Herman Metz
- Defunct: 1922; 104 years ago
- Fate: Bankrupt
- Successor: Motor Manufacturers Incorporated
- Headquarters: Waltham, Massachusetts, United States
- Key people: Charles H. Metz, William H. Little
- Products: Automobiles, Automotive parts
- Production output: 40,082 (1909-1922)

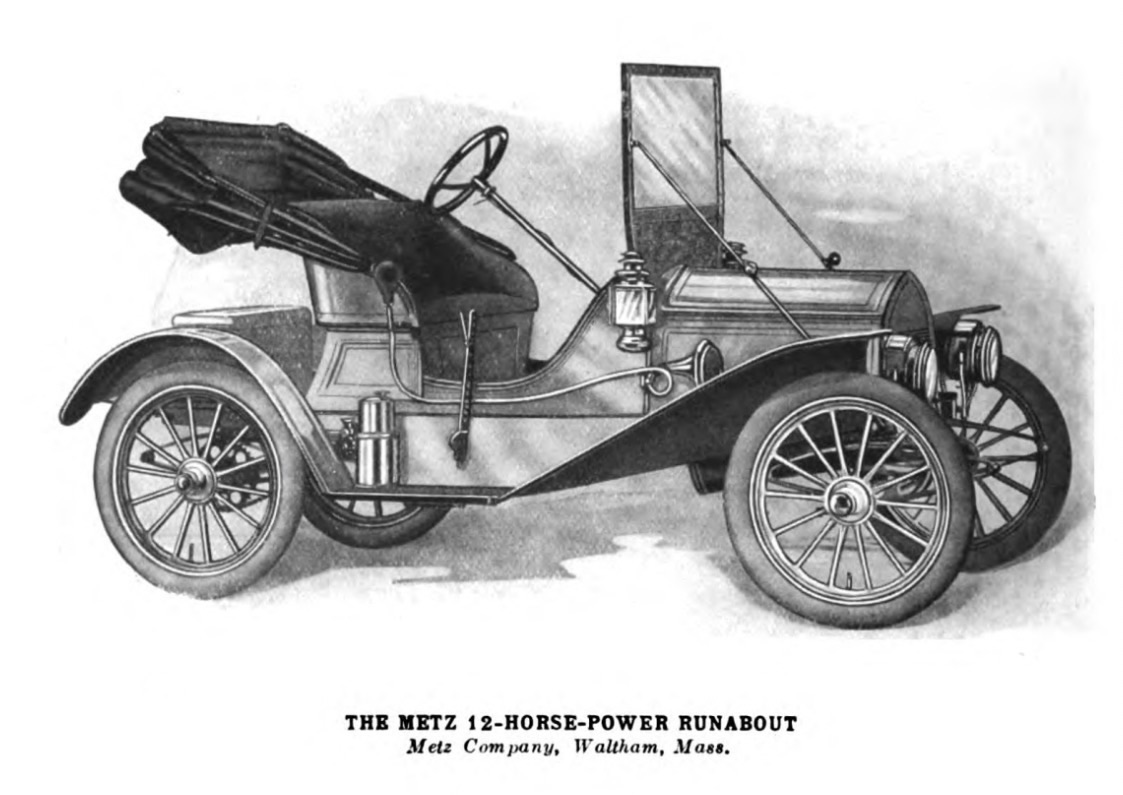
Metz 12 hp (1910-1911)

The Metz Company was a pioneer brass era automobile maker established by Charles Herman Metz in Waltham, Massachusetts, from 1909 to 1922.

== History ==
C. H. Metz began in business in 1886 making bicycle parts, and in 1893 formed the Waltham Manufacturing Company with Herbert L. Thompson, Elmer G. Howe and Frank L. Howe. Later the firm developed designs for motorized vehicles. Metz departed his company over disagreements of company direction in 1901. He became the technical editor of the Cycle and Automobile Trade Journal.

Waltham Manufacturing Co. was in financial difficulties and in 1908 C. H. Metz took back control. He reorganized as the Metz Company in 1909.

=== Kit car ===
Metz inherited a large stock of automobile parts for the 10-hp runabout designed by William H. Little. Although Metz was not the first to offer a kit car (Dyke and Sears predated Metz with do-it-your-self high-wheelers), Metz did offer the first known kit automobile on the installment plan, known as the Metz Plan. The buyer would buy 14 groups or packages of parts for $27 which would be put together with the plans and tools supplied, for a total price of $378, (equivalent to $13,545 in 2025). A factory-assembled automobile could be bought for $475. The plan was in effect until 1911 when it became impractical to compete with a dealer-supplied model "T" Ford.

In 1910, the two-cylinder 10-hp Metz was increased to 12-hp. Built on an 81-inch wheelbase, complete runabouts or special delivery body cars were produced into 1912.

=== Model 22 ===
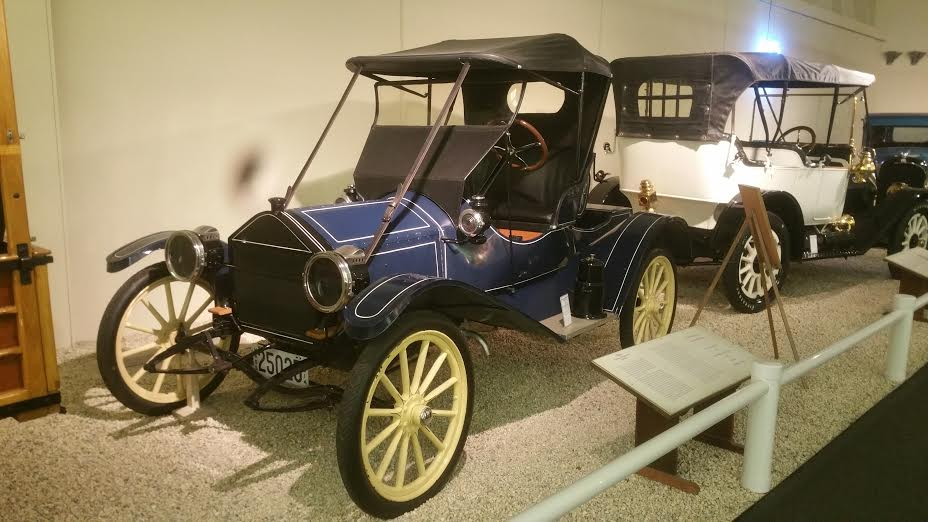
1913 Runabout

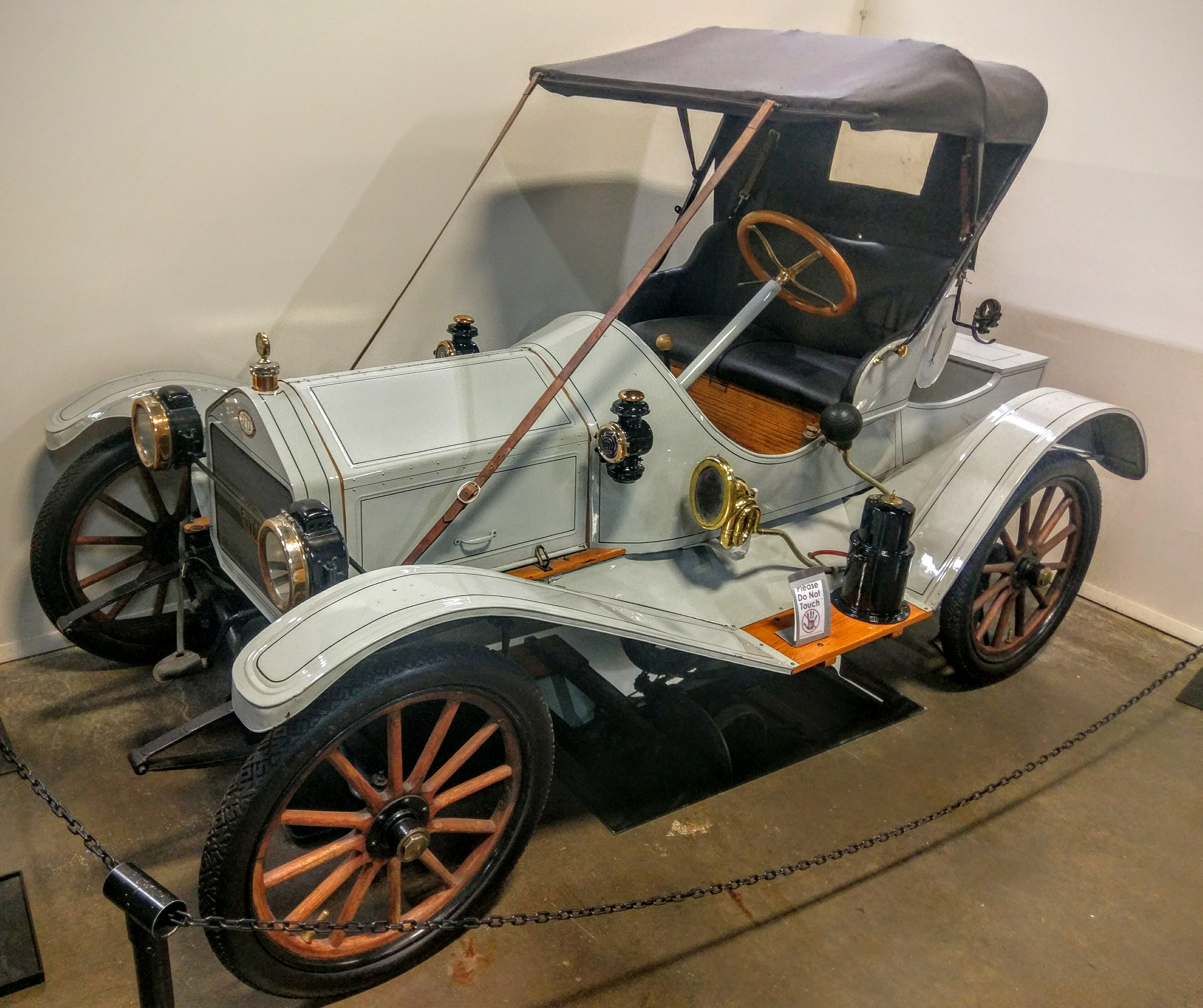
1912 Model 22 Roadster, on display at the California Automobile Museum

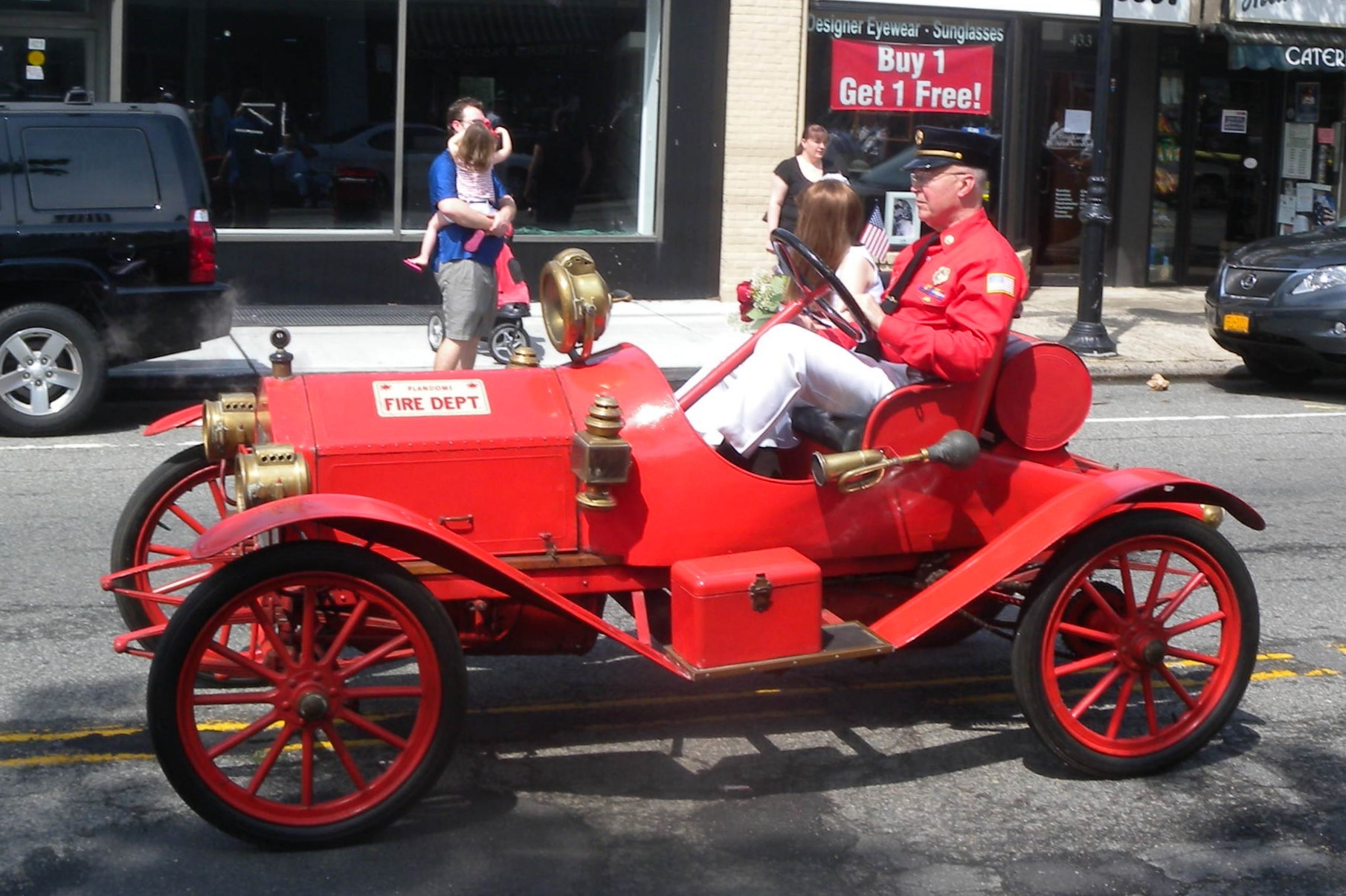
Model 22 runabout in a parade

In 1913, Metz introduced the Model 22, a two-seat roadster or torpedo bodied car, with an en-bloc 22½ hp (17 kW) four-cylinder water-cooled engine. The Metz 22 had a 90-inch wheelbase with Bosch magneto, full-elliptic springs front and rear, artillery wheels with Goodrich clincher tires, and featured a Prest-O-Lite-type acetylene generator for the headlights. It was billed as "gearless", having a friction drive mechanism, and priced at $475, equivalent to $15,473 in 2025.

Advertisements claimed to be the "winner of the Glidden Tour", due to all 3 of the participating Metz cars receiving a perfect score. In 1914 Metz had a Speedster model added at a price of $500. In 1915, Model 22 became Model 25 with an improved 25-hp engine on a 108-inch wheelbase.

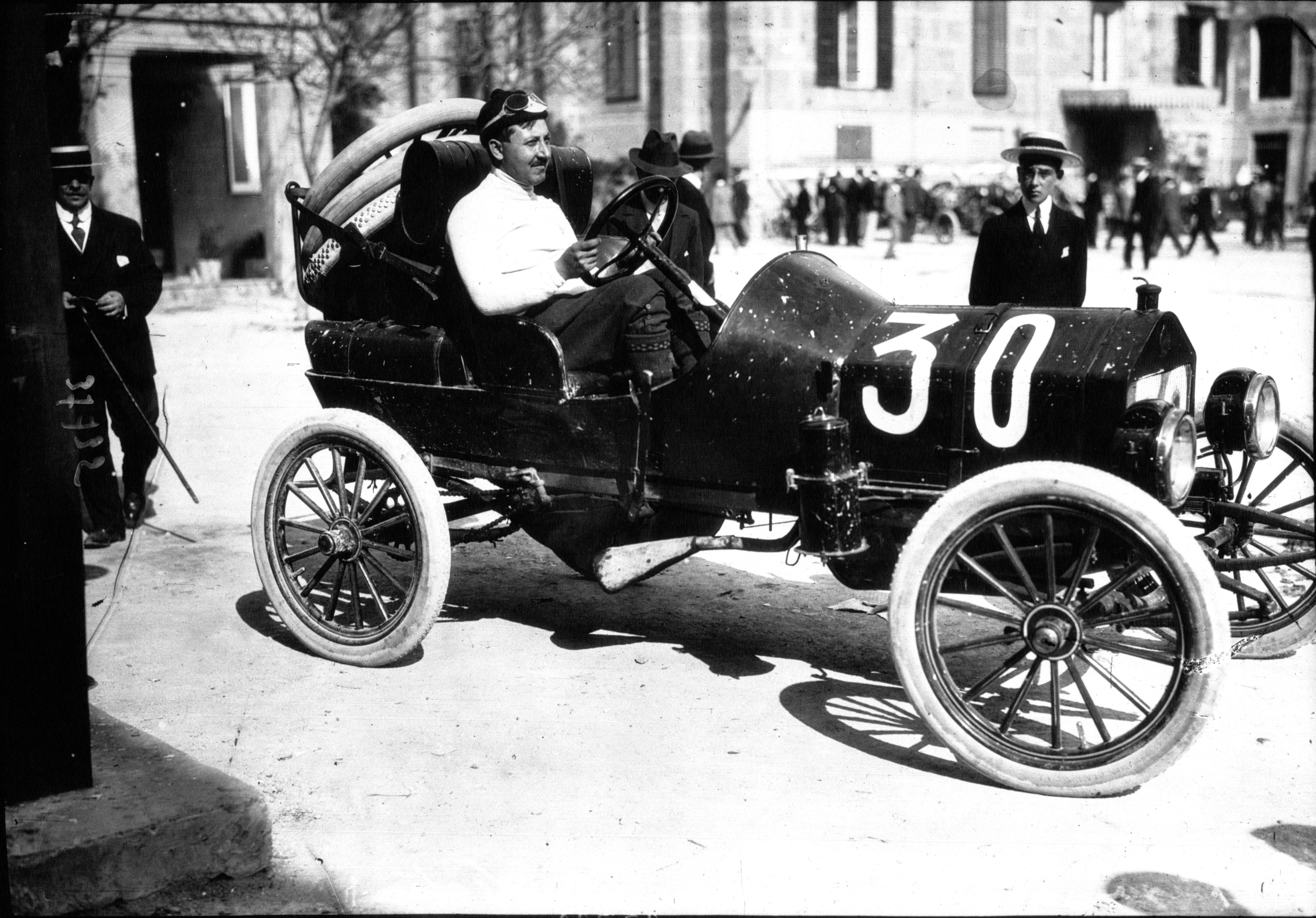
Gaetano Napoli in his Metz at the 1913 Targa Florio

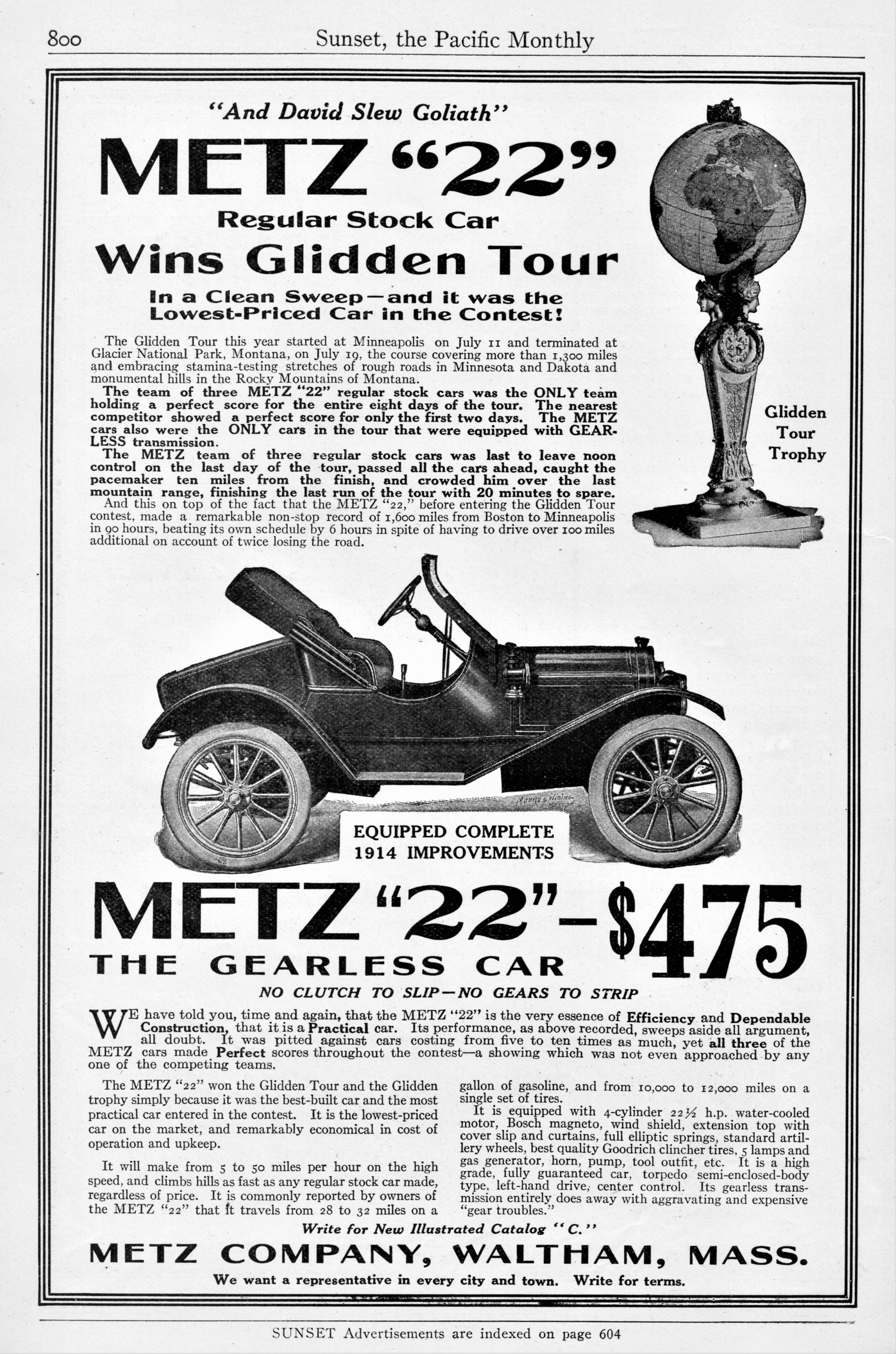
1914 Metz 22 Advertisement

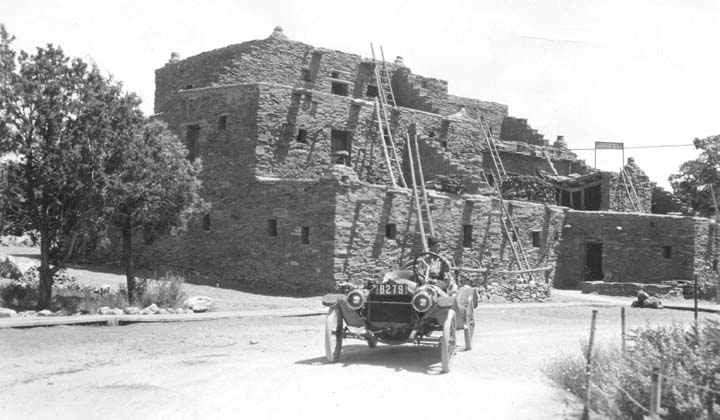
1914 Metz at Grand Canyon Hopi House

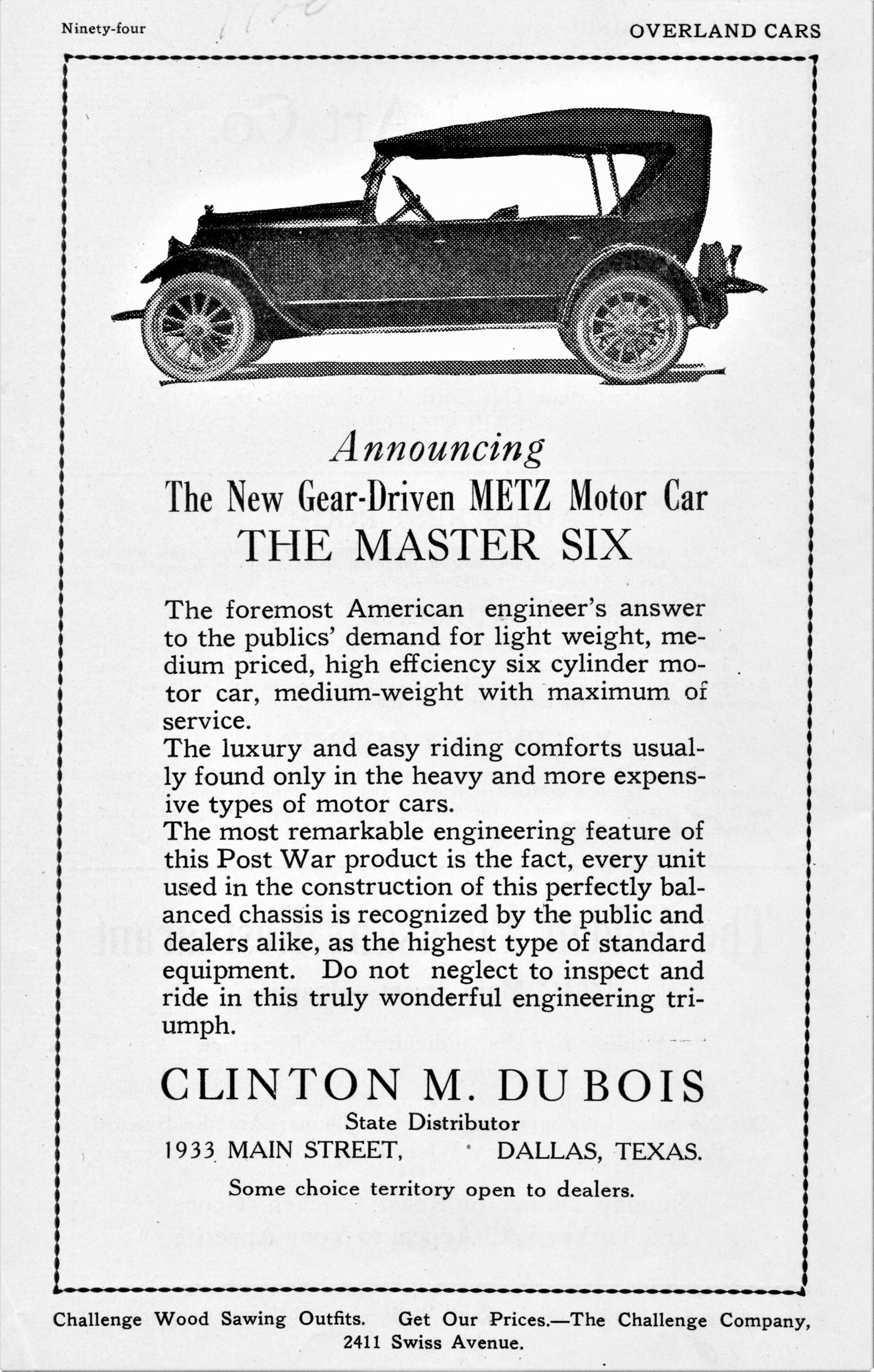
1920 Metz Master Six

== Production figures Metz ==
40.082 cars have been produced

| Year | Production figures | Model | Serial number |
|---|---|---|---|
| 1909 | 1,816 | 10 hp | |
| 1910 | 1,913 | 12 hp | |
| 1911 | 1,812 | 12 hp | |
| 1912 | 2,336 | 22 | |
| 1913 | 5,312 | 22 | |
| 1914 | 6,230 (5,851+300) | 22 | 22950 to 28800 28801 to 29100 |
| 1915 | 7,163 (3,849) | 22, 25 | 29101 to 32949 |
| 1916 | 6,130 (7,249) | 22,25 | 33000 to 40248 |
| 1917 | 3,120 (4,352) | 25 | 40249 to 44600 |
| 1918 | 1,312 ↑ | 25 | 40249 to 44600 |
| 1919 | 1,275 (5,635) | Master six | 45015 to 50649 |
| 1920 | 810 (871) | Master six | 50650 to 51520 |
| 1921 | 853 | Master six | 51521 to .. |
| Sum | 40,082 | | |

=== Fate ===
In 1917 Metz added 3 types of light trucks to their car production, but business was curtailed in 1918 due to the World War. The Factory was turned over to war work, but post-war road-blocks caused Metz to never collect $130,000 due from the government. In 1919 Metz fielded a larger car called the Metz Master 6, with a six-cylinder 45-hp engine. This 120-inch wheelbase car, with a price range from $1,895 to $2,895 for an enclosed sedan, did not sell well.

The post-war depression caused a dire financial condition and Metz was taken over by the Waltham National Bank. They reorganized the company and renamed it the Motor Manufacturers Incorporated of Waltham. The Metz Master 6 was renamed the Waltham Six, which sold for $2,450 and was produced in 1922 only. This restructuring attempt failed, and Charles Metz filed for Bankruptcy in August 1922.

== See also ==
- Classic Speedsters Blog Charles Metz Speedster
- Metz/Waltham Automobiles Blog
- Metz car in the Grand Canyon
