= Dragon Automobile Company =

Automobile company

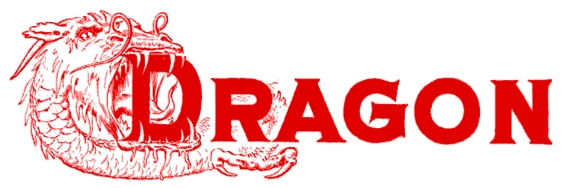
- Company type: Automobile Manufacturing
- Industry: Automotive
- Genre: Touring cars
- Founded: 1906
- Defunct: 1908
- Fate: succeeded by Dragon Motor Company
- Headquarters: Detroit, Michigan and Philadelphia, Pennsylvania, United States
- Area served: United States
- Products: Vehicles; Automotive parts

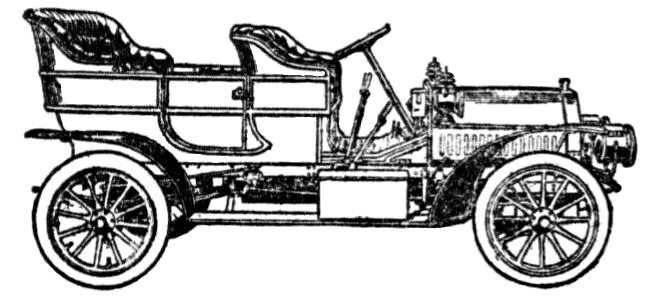
1907 Dragon Touring Car

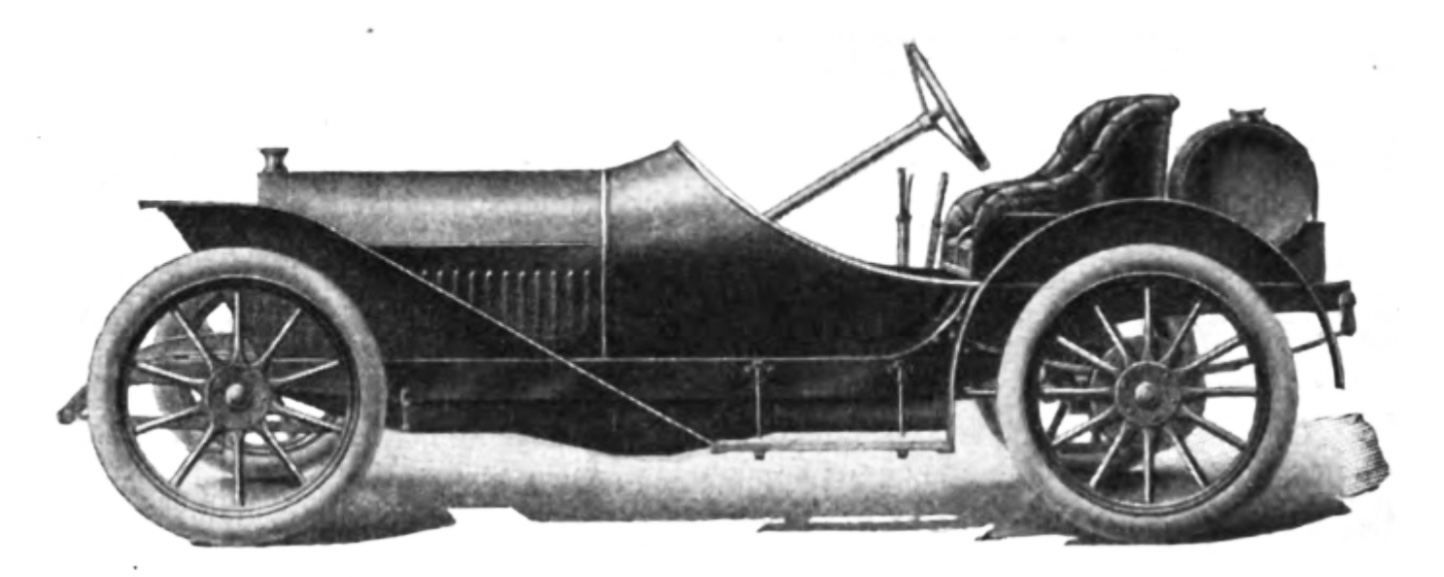
Dragon 1908 Roadster

The Dragon Automobile Company manufactured automobiles from 1906 to 1908, first in Detroit, Michigan, and then in Philadelphia, Pennsylvania. It was followed, briefly, by the Dragon Motor Company.

== Beginnings in Detroit ==
They hired an excellent engineer to design its automobile: Leo Melanowski, who had apprenticed with the Otto Gas Engine Company in Vienna, worked for Panhard-Levassor and Clement-Bayard in France and Waltham in the United States and had been manufacturing foreman for Winton. Dragon also enlisted the services of famed racing driver Joe Tracy as an engineering consultant and test driver.

The result was a fine four-cylinder motorcar that featured sliding gear transmission and shaft drive, and price tags in the $2,000 range, which were quite reasonable considering the specification. The matter Dragon skimped upon, it would appear, was quality control in production. Melanowski left early on to design the Aerocar from Detroit, and Joe Tracy didn't hang around long either. The company had been incorporated in Maine in the summer of 1906 with Harold P. Knowlton as president, Albert E. Knowlton as treasurer.

Production began in Detroit in late fall, and the first models were ready for the New York Automobile Show at Grand Central Palace that December.

== The move to Philadelphia ==
Meanwhile the plant of the J. G. Brill and Company in Philadelphia had been secured, and operations were moved there. Soon thereafter two attachments were served by the Sheriff of New York County on the cars and property of the Dragon Automobile Company.

These resulted from two complaints. The first was from C.W. Ward, the Dragon agent for Newark (New Jersey), who stated that three cars had been delivered to him that "were not up to the standard guaranteed, and it was found impossible to get the company to put them in proper repair." Ward wanted his advance deposit back. The other complainant was W.S. Daniels of Boston, a former Dragon employee, who demanded back salary and commissions amounting to $1,700. Nor was this all. It was further reported that the Dragon Automobile Company had borrowed $136,000 from a Philadelphia bank, using as security 200 Dragon touring cars that had been placed in storage in Philadelphia, to be removed therefrom only under the bank's direction and with a percentage of their sale price to be applied as part payment for the loan.

By this time screaming creditors included the Herschell-Spillman engine manufacturers and the coil-and-sparkplug-producing C.F. Splitdorf company. By December 1907 the Dragon Automobile Company had given up, its president John Kane Mills declaring personal bankruptcy three months later. By that time the firm had been succeeded by the Dragon Motor Company organized by J.E. Calhoun with a grand capitalization of a million dollars and the idea of entering the taxicab market.

=== Dragon Motor Company ===
In March 1908 Calhoun, already in trouble, agreed to receivership although he denied insolvency. Among his problems was the five months back rent that had been owed the J.B. Brill Company by Dragon Automobile Company, the payment for which Brill was now demanding of Dragon Motor Company. By late March Calhoun decided to give up, too. Seventy touring car chassis remained to be completed when the Dragon plant and its assets were sold at public auction in early April 1908. Gorson Auto Exchange of Philadelphia bought everything, and presumably finished building the last 50 Dragons.

== Models ==
Model(year)	Engine	HP	Wheelbase	Weight
1906-1907	4-cylinder	24/26	104"	1,950lbs
1908 Roadster	226.2 CID 4-cylinder	35	96"	1,900lbs.
1908 Touring	4-cylinder	24/26	104"	1,950lbs.

== See also ==
- Brass Era car
