= Waltham Manufacturing Company =

Defunct American motor vehicle manufacturer

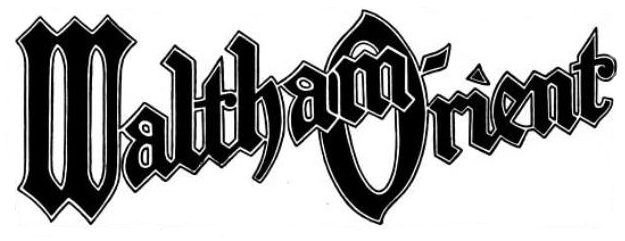
- Type: Automobile manufacturing
- Industry: Automotive
- Founded: 1893; 133 years ago
- Founder: Charles Herman Metz, Prof. Herbert L. Thompson, Elmer G. Howe, Frank L. Howe, William Parrot
- Defunct: 1910; 116 years ago
- Fate: 1908 take-over, 1910 absorbed
- Successor: Metz Company
- Headquarters: Waltham, Massachusetts, United States
- Key people: Charles Herman Metz, Leonard B. Gaylor, Charles A. Coffin, John Robbins, Albert Champion, Leo Melanowsky, William H. Little
- Products: Bicycles motorcycles motorized tricycles & quadricycles buckboards automobiles gasoline engines automotive parts
- Number of employees: ca. 200 in 1909

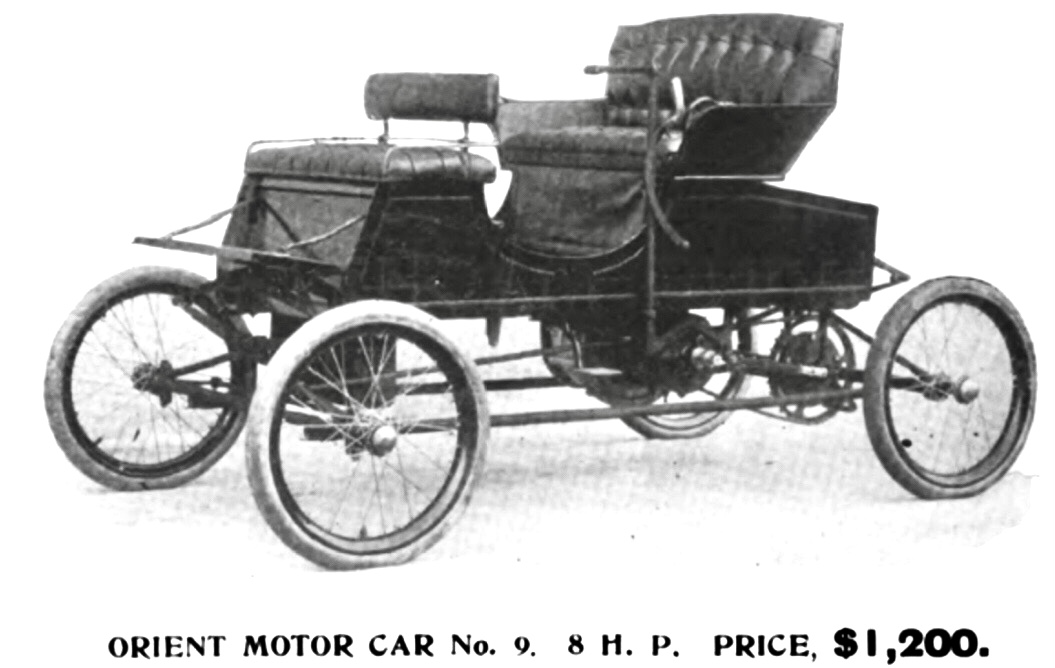
Orient Model No. 9 (1902-1903)

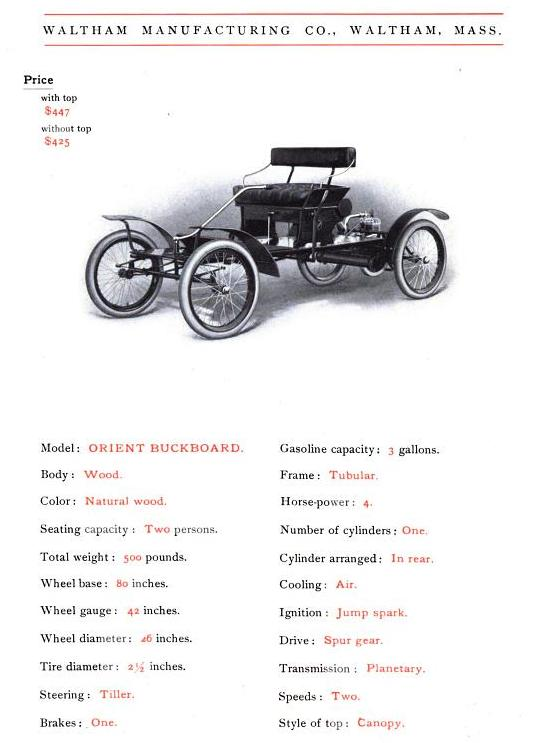
1904 Waltham Orient Buckboard

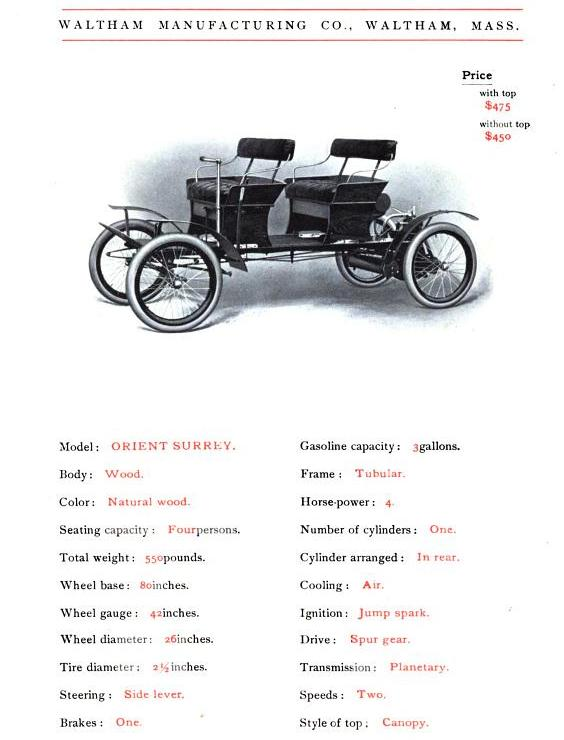
1904 Waltham Orient Surrey

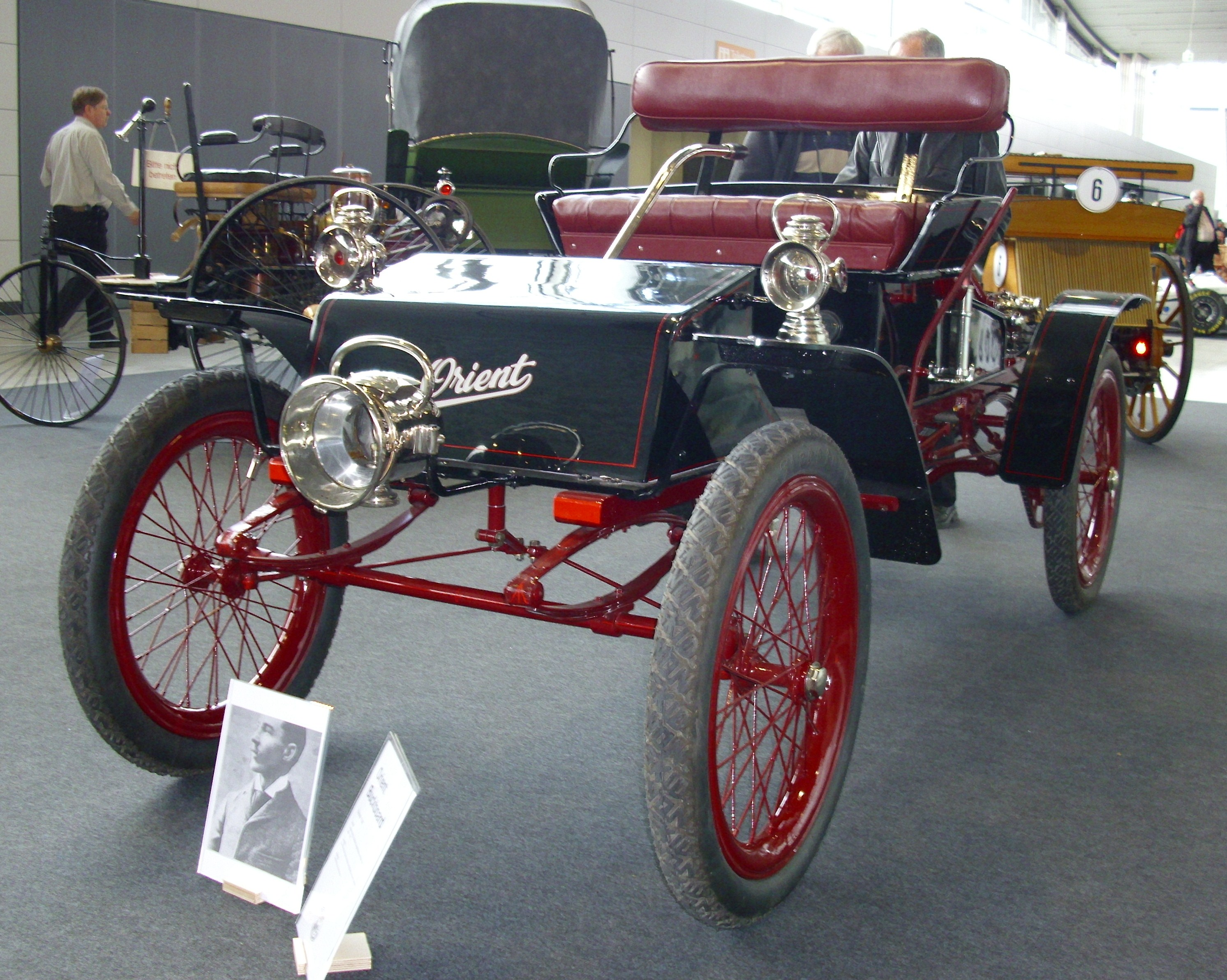
Late Waltham Orient Buckboard (1906)

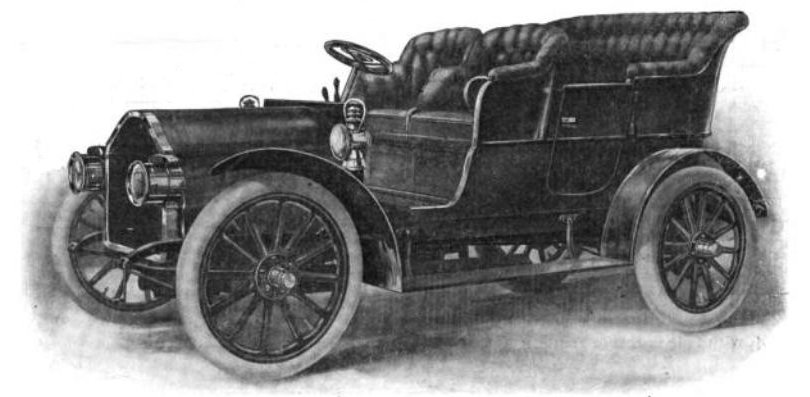
1905 Orient 20 HP De Luxe Touring priced at $2250

Waltham Manufacturing Company (WMC) was a manufacturer of bicycles, motorcycles, motorized tricycles and quadricycles, buckboards, and automobiles in Waltham, Massachusetts. It sold products under the brand names Orient, Waltham, and Waltham-Orient. The company was founded in 1893, moving to self-propelled vehicles after 1898.

== History ==
Waltham Manufacturing Company was founded by Waltham businessmen around engineer Charles Herman Metz (1863–1937). Metz encouraged two employees to build a steam car of their own in the company's premises, which led to the Waltham Steam. Metz imported French Aster engines, and secured the U.S. distributorship for De Dion-Bouton engines and imported this maker's tricycles and quadricycles. Using De Dion-Bouton patents, WMC started building their own Orient Autogo and Orient Autogo Quad in 1899.

An early investor in WMC, Charles A. Coffin (1844–1926), first president of General Electric, ordered an electric prototype in 1898, which didn't go into production. Metz experimented with engines mounted on bicycles. The evolving Orient Aster was one of the first U.S.-built motorcycles. Metz was assisted by famed French bicycle racer Albert Champion (1878–1927) who arrived in the U.S. around 1899, becoming one of the first professional motorbike racers. Metz is even claimed to have found the expression "motor cycle" for his new vehicle, first used in an 1899 advertisement. Further, engines of Metz' design were developed and produced.

WMC's first car was a motor buggy called the Orient Victoriette, followed by two runabouts in 1902 and 1903. About 400 of the earlier model were sold; the newer Orient Runabout No. 9 was not a success with about 50 examples built.

In 1902, Metz left the company, founding Metz Motorcycle Company and C.H. Metz Company in town soon after. Engineer Leonard B. Gaylor succeeded him at WMC. The same year, Gaylor introduced a very light model with friction drive, sold as the Orient Buckboard. It seated 2 passengers and sold for just $425 (equivalent to $15,815 in 2025), making it the lowest-priced automobile available. The vertically mounted air-cooled single-cylinder engine with 756 cc (Bore 82.55 mm = 3.25 inches, stroke 107.95 mm = 4.25 inches) , situated at the rear of the car, produced 4 hp (3.0 kW). The car had tiller steering, weighed 500 pounds (230 kg) and had a 100 mi (160 km) range, though minimal springing and the complete lack of any bodywork made it less than practical for a long journey. In the next years, it was offered in several models (including a diminutive delivery car), got an improved suspension, steering wheel, two chains instead of one belt to transmit the power to the rear wheels, and an optional 8 hp (6.0 kW) two cylinder engine. It remained in production until 1907.

Plant superintendent John Robbins left in 1904. He was replaced by Leo Melanowski who was also chief engineer.

More conventional cars came in 1905 with front-mounted, water cooled inline 4-cylinder engines of 16 or 20 hp (12 or 15 kW) and chain drive. They were made until 1908. These power-plants were of proprietary design and consisted of four single cylinders mounted on a common crankcase.

Melanowski left in 1906, his position taken by William H. Little. Little developed a small runabout with a 10 hp (7.5 kW) V-twin engine and friction drive. Shortly before production started in 1908, WMC got into financial trouble and to avoid bankruptcy, their bank negotiated with Charles Metz. In July 1908, the C.H. Metz Company bought WMC, making Metz owner of one of the largest automobile manufacturer in the U.S. Reorganizations followed in 1909 and 1910, when the C.H. Metz Co. and WMC together were reorganized as the Metz Company.

Little's small car became the Metz Two, sold by marketing in 14 batches and assembled by the customer. It worked, and the company was not only out of debt in less than a year but also sold its huge stock of parts.

== Production models ==
- Orient Model No. 9
- Waltham Orient Buckboard ·
- Waltham Model E
- Waltham Model K
- Waltham Model L
- Waltham Model M
- Waltham Model N
- Waltham Model R
- Waltham Orient Light Touring Car
- Waltham De Luxe Touring Car
- Waltham Orient Limousine
- Waltham Delivery
- Waltham 178 C Parcel Car
- Waltham 28 Runabout
- Waltham 138 Roadster
- Waltham 158 Family Tourer
- Waltham D.L.R. Runabout
- Waltham 17
- Waltham White
- Waltham 1,5 t Truck
- Waltham 3 t Truck

== See also ==
- Brass Era car
- List of defunct United States automobile manufacturers
