= Flint Wagon Works =

Automobile company

Coordinates: 43°00′41.9″N 83°42′14.6″W

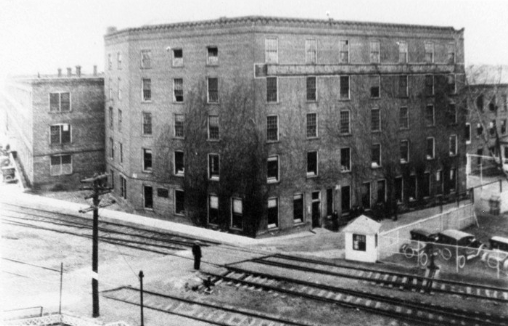
Flint Wagon Works in 1912

Flint Wagon Works of Flint, Michigan, manufactured wagons from the early 1880s. One of the world's most successful horse-drawn vehicle makers they formed with their Flint neighbors a core of the American automobile industry. In 1905 Flint was promoting itself as Flint the Vehicle City. The former site is now located in the neighborhood of Flint known as "Carriagetown".

Flint Wagon Works brought the automotive industry to Flint by buying David Dunbar Buick's Detroit business and moving it to Flint.

Overburdened with debt and litigation Flint Wagon Works shareholders sold their business to William C. Durant as of October 12, 1911. Durant took the useful parts of the business and began to manufacture Little automobiles. Sales were hindered by poor quality product and their unappealing brandname and Durant put Little into Chevrolet in 1913. After GM assumed operations, it became the manufacturing location of what later became Chevrolet Flint Manufacturing.

== Founding ==
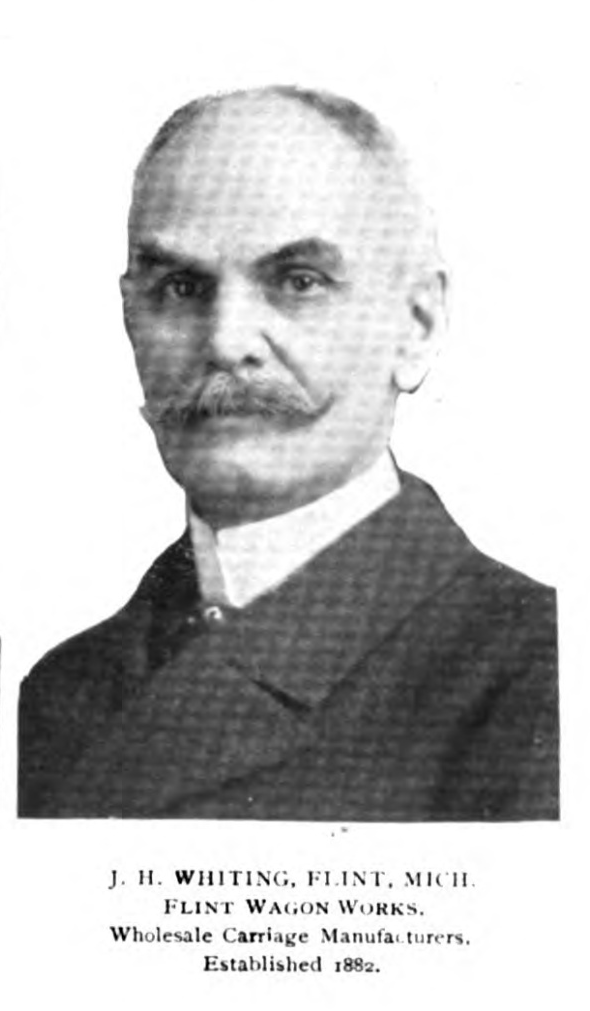
James H. Whiting
(1842-1919)

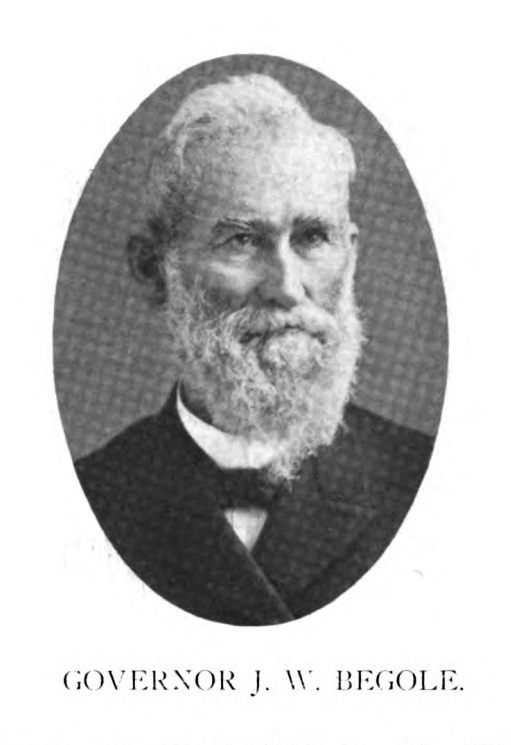
Josiah W. Begole
(1815-1896)

Flint Wagon Works began business after James H. Whiting (1842–1919), the secretary and general manager of the Flint lumber business, Begole Fox & Co, suggested Begole Fox make wagons. The original business partners were: Whiting, Josiah W. Begole, (later governor of Michigan), David S. Fox, George L. Walker (1838-1909) and Allen Beach Sr, the superintendent of the works, who died in 1885.

They named the new business Flint Wagon Works and in the early 1880s set up a building for it on Flint's West Kearsley Street on a vacant Begole Fox lumber yard. Later William S. Ballenger Sr., Charles A Cumings and Josiah Begole's son, Charles Myron Begole (1848-1921) joined the original partnership. Josiah Begole died in his eighties in 1896.

Begole Fox set up their lumber-mills in September 1865. They were among Flint's largest dealers in lumber and they were major manufacturers of lath and wood shingles.

== Wagons — Flint's Big Three ==
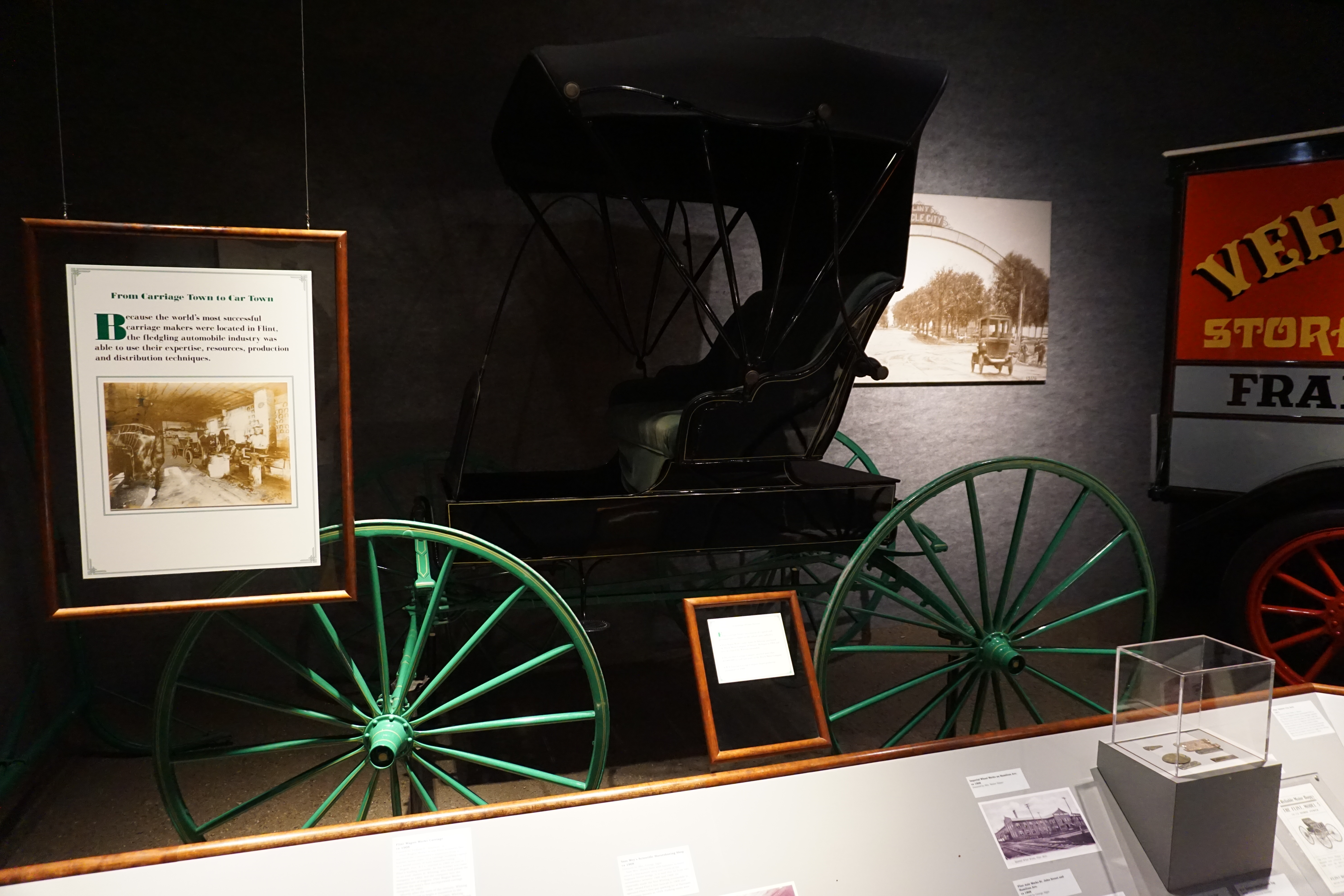
A Flint Wagon Works carriage c.1908

Their business became the second of Flint's "Big Three" wagon builders following William A. Paterson's founded in 1869. The third new business was founded in the mid 1880s, William C. Durant's Flint Road Cart Company later renamed Durant-Dort Carriage Company. Their main competitor was the South Bend, Indiana, Studebaker Brothers Manufacturing Company. The following numbers were reported in April 1904:

- Flint Wagon Works capacity not reported but output was reported to be wagons 75 percent and farm wagons 25 percent
- William A. Paterson reported capacity 30,000 vehicles annually, current output 75 percent carriages and 25 percent spring wagons
- Durant-Dort Carriage Company reported capacity 70,000 vehicles annually, current output types not disclosed)

== Automobiles ==
=== Buick ===
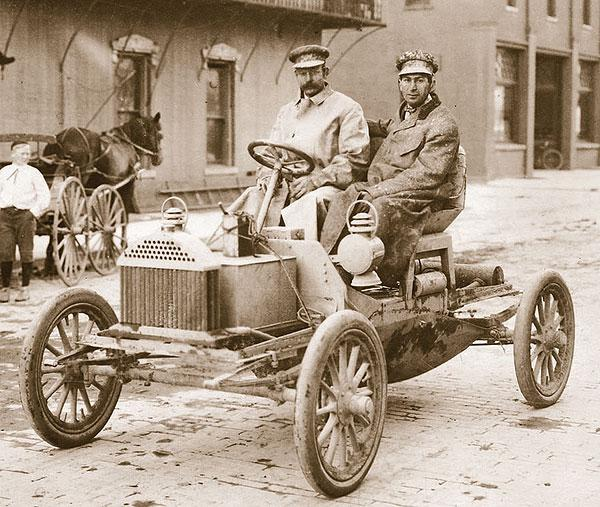
Buick car on January 8 or July 8, 1904. The driver is engineer Walter L. Marr, the passenger is David Buick's son, Tom

Believing buyers of their farm wagons would be interested in buying many more Buick stationary engines Flint Wagon Works bought existing supplier David Buick's business, Buick Motor Company, in September 1903 for its stationary and marine engines and its plans to manufacture automobile motors and transmissions. Flint Wagon Works built a suitable new building on the opposite side of West Kearsley Street. Some cars were built with these engines and sold with the brand name Whiting-Buick (after chairman James H Whiting). The first production Buick cars were built in that building in 1904.

Flint Wagon Works dissolved the old Buick Motor Company and incorporated a wholly new entity, The Buick Motor Company, on January 29, 1904. Its initial capital stock of $37,500 in shares of $10 each was owned by: David Buick, 1,500; James H. Whiting 610 (and 978 as trustee = 1,588); George L. Walker 590; and William S. Ballenger 72. James H Whiting to be manager. Reported as 40 percent to David Buick and 60 percent to Flint Wagon Works stockholders. Later Charles Cumings and Charles M. Begole joined the other shareholders.

The first completed car — a Model B — was begun May 20, 1904, on the road by the beginning of July and delivered to a Dr Herbert Hills of Flint July 27, 1904.

==== Durant ====
The Buick shareholders persuaded William C. Durant to take on its management. The capital was increased to $300,000 at the beginning of November 1904 when Durant took control. Begole replaced Whiting as president, Ballenger was secretary, Whiting remained a director and Durant joined them on the board of directors. In September 1905 a further $300,000 of capital was invested in cash and in addition more shares were issued to Durant in payment for $268,000 worth of patentable inventions and other property introduced by him. Durant moved manufacture to the former plant of Imperial Wheel in Jackson, assembly remained in Flint where the bodies were made by Flint Wagon Works.

Durant's friend, Sam McLaughlin of Canada's McLaughlin Motor Car Company, offshoot of another major carriage manufacturer, was one of the early customers for the engines because McLaughlin's own in-house design was not ready when their car production began. The manufacture of complete Buicks moved to Hamilton's Farm — Oak Park, Flint — but the engines did not follow until some years later. Buick engines continued to be made in the same building until 1908 or 1909.

=== Whiting automobiles ===
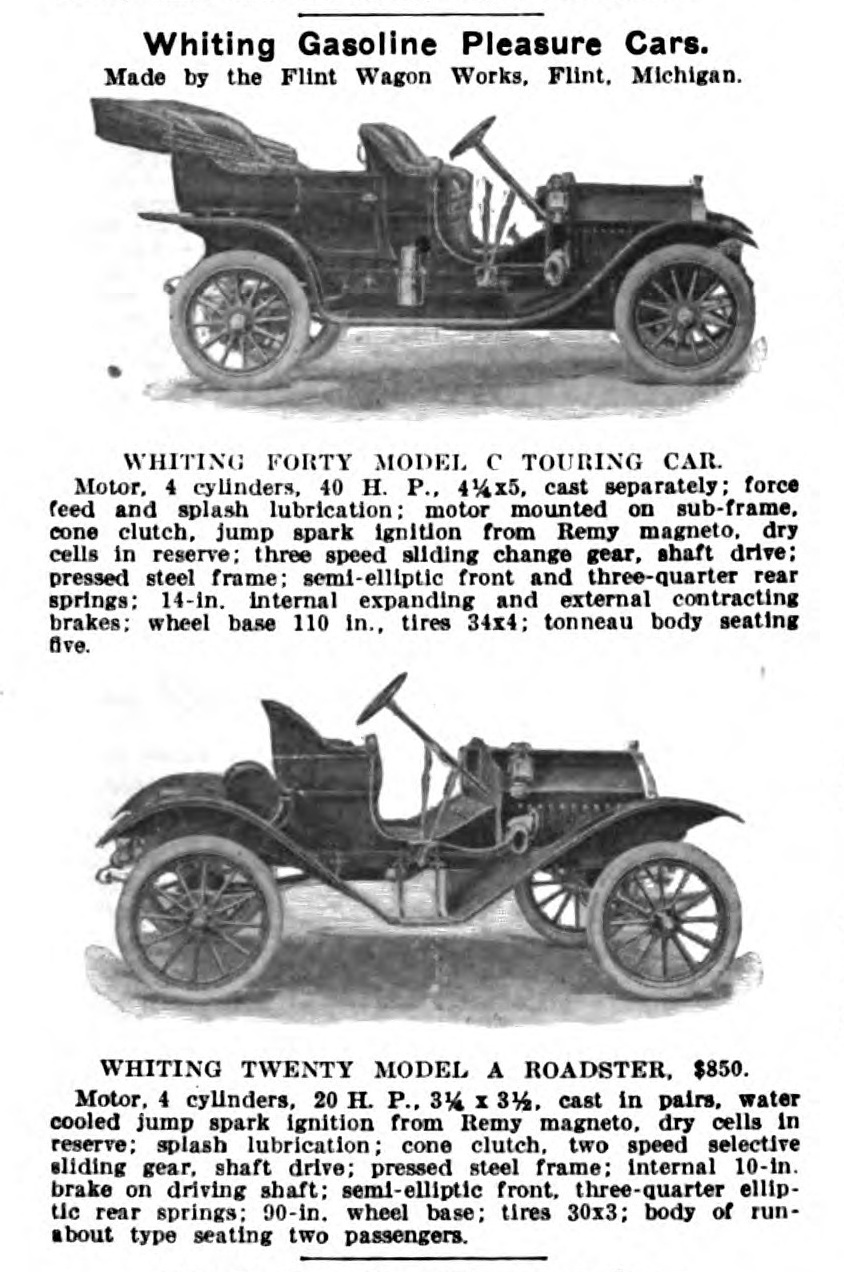
1910 Flint Wagon Works' cars

Demand for Flint Wagon Works' horse-drawn vehicles maintained its steady decline in the face of the rapidly rising automobile trade. Flint Wagon Works let it be known in early 1909 they were developing new automobiles which would be available in 1910. Their Whiting model A and Whiting Model C were displayed at the Detroit Auto Show in January 1910. The Model A was a light four-cylinder two-passenger roadster with an engine rated at 20 hp and the Model C was a five-passenger touring car with a four-cylinder motor rated at 40 hp. Both were of conventional design.

Flint Wagon Works then fell deep into well-publicised and expensive litigation over their use of Selden patent designs in their new engines. At first the Whiting cars were built in Detroit and Flint-made bodies were added to them then the whole production process was moved to Flint. Some 1200 Whiting cars were sold in 1910 but in the fall of 1910 Flint Wagon Works failed to make a loan repayment and their bank took control appointing a special board of directors. The bank's trusteeship ended in February 1911 when more than half a million dollars more capital was given to Flint Wagon Works which paid off the bank loan.

==== Durant ====
Impressed by Durant's success the Flint Wagon Works directors invited Durant to invest in their own company on the condition that he participate in its management. By this time, 1911, Durant had organized General Motors to hold not only Buick but Cadillac, Olds, Oakland and other successful automobile businesses.

== Terminal difficulties ==
Flint Wagon Works was in severe financial difficulties by the beginning of 1911. Some months following that offer Durant paid them just $10 and bought Flint Wagon Works from its shareholders along with all its assets and liabilities. Wagon manufacture continued.

=== Spin-offs ===
==== Little Motor Car Company ====
Durant used those assets of Flint Wagon Works that were still useful to manufacture Little cars. William H. Little's Little Motor Car Company was incorporated on October 19, 1911, by Charles M. Begole, William S. Ballenger Sr, William H. Little (1876-1922), and Durant with a capital of $1,200,000.
A.B.C. (Alexander Brownell Cullen) Hardy (1869-1946) was appointed to manage the Little plant.

The same week Durant's other project, Chevrolet Motor Co of Detroit was incorporated with $100,000 capital stock. Its incorporators were: Louis Chevrolet, William H Little and Durant's business confidant and son-in-law, Dr Edwin R Campbell.

==== Mason Motor Co ====
Arthur C. Mason, previously manager of the Buick engine plant in conjunction with Charles Byrne, Charles E. Wetherald and Durant set up his Mason Motor Co in 1911 to make Chevrolet engines for Durant's new Chevrolet enterprise and first occupied a Flint Wagon Works building before moving to the old Buick building. See Mason Truck

==== Plant ====
Ultimately all the buildings became part of the complex known as Chevrolet Manufacturing.

== See also ==
- Flint Automobile Company
