= James H. Whiting =

American industrialist and automobile pioneer

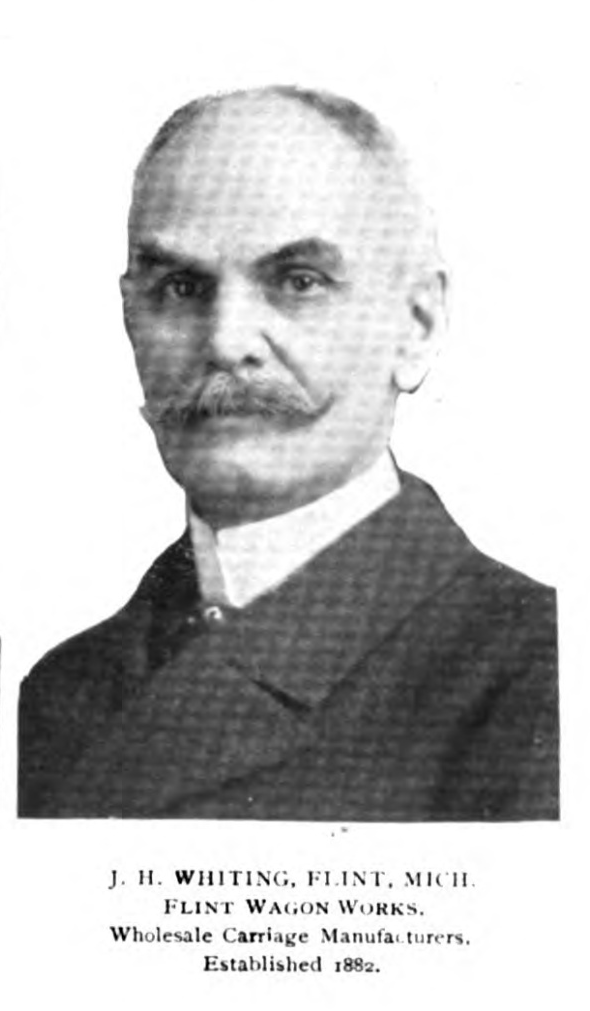
- James H. Whiting in 1904
- Born: James H. Whiting; May 16, 1843; Waterbury, Connecticut, U.S.
- Died: June 2, 1919 (aged 76); New York City, New York, U.S.
- Occupation: Business
- Known for: Co-founder of Flint Wagon Works and Chevrolet
- Spouse: Alice Northrup (m. 1869)
- Children: 1

James H. Whiting (May 16, 1843 – June 2, 1919) was an American industrialist and automobile pioneer. Without any engineering experience and a clear conception of the manufacture, sale, and marketing of automobiles, he produced and sold buggies, carts, and farm wagons. He was a co-founder of Flint Wagon Works, which later became Chevrolet Flint Manufacturing. He was the competitor of William C. Durant in the manufacture of carriages.

== Biography ==
James H. Whiting was born on May 16, 1843, in Waterbury, Connecticut. At the age of 20, he moved to Flint, Michigan, and joined the dry goods store William L. Smith & Judd Company as head bookkeeper. The store was later renamed Smith-Bridgman Company.

Whiting first worked in the lumber industry. He operated the Whiting & Richardson Hardware Store. One of his workers was Josiah Dallas Dort. He then left the company to manage Begole, Fox and Company. It was a company partly owned by Josiah Begole, D. S. Fox and George L. Walker and was engaged in the lumber business. This company was eventually transformed into Flint Wagon Works in 1882. Whiting became its president in 1902. He oversaw the company's production of wagons and carriages.

Years later, Whiting became interested in the automobile business. He believed that due to his knowledge and experience in the manufacture of wagons and carriages, he would be capable of manufacturing automobiles. He then purchased Benjamin and Frank Briscoe's interests in the Buick Manufacturing Company in the summer of 1903. An account describes how Buick's son, Tom, drove one Buick car to Flint to prove to Whiting that the self-propelled vehicle worked and the latter was impressed. Initially, Whiting was interested in manufacturing engines for stationary and marine use and also for the use in automobiles. By 1904, he agreed to the production of an entire automobile.

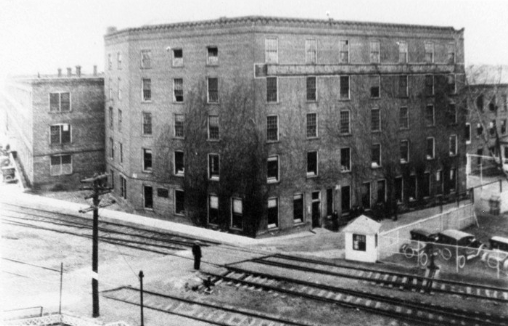
The Flint Wagon Works, which later became Chevrolet's manufacturing plant.

Whitings' two companies merged to form Buick Manufacturing Company and its facilities were moved to Flint from Buick's headquarters in Detroit. Flint during this period was the center for the American wagon and carriage production due to its proximity to Michigan's extensive hardwood forests. By 1903, the company was able to produce 3 automobiles. Durant was asked to organize the Whiting Motor Car Company in 1903 as a Buick subsidiary. Whiting served as the president of this company, which was dissolved in 1907.

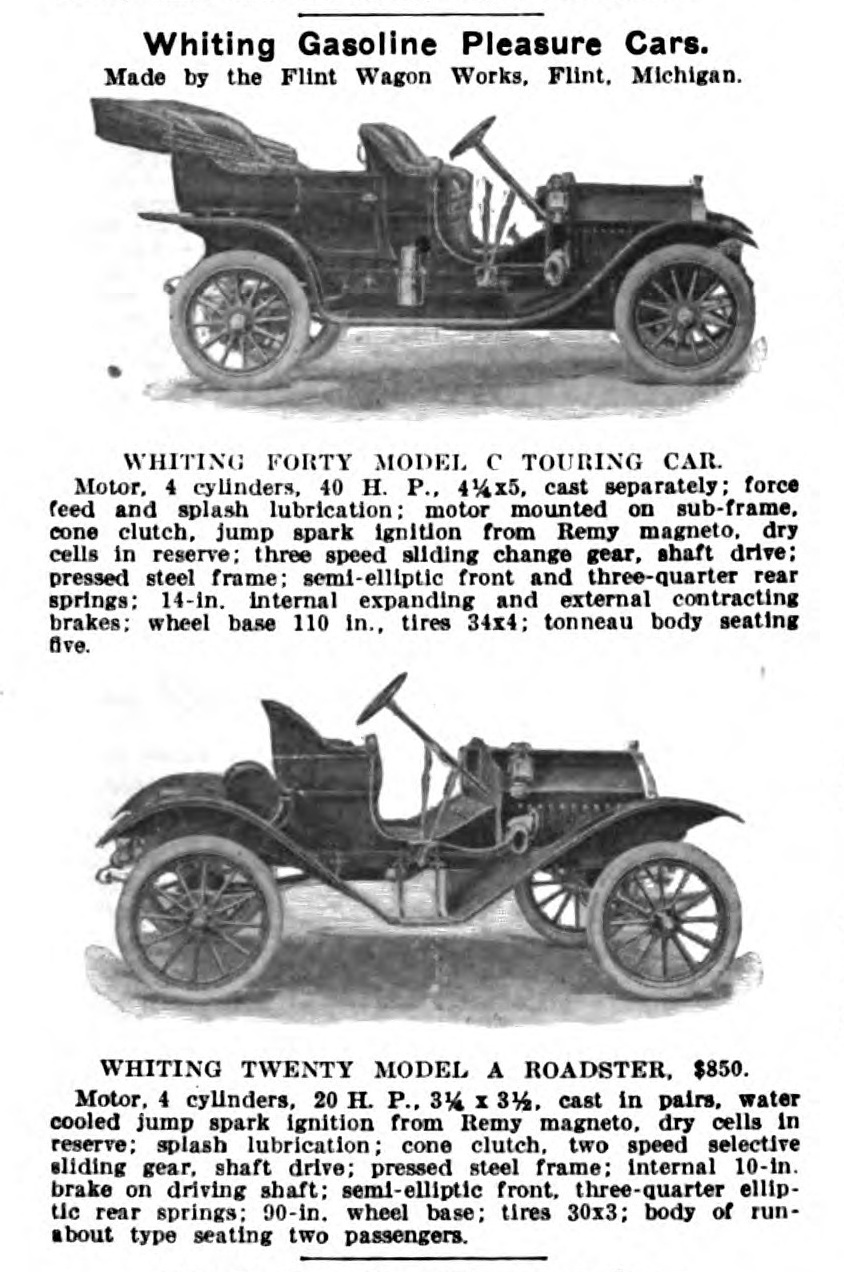
The Whiting automobile manufactured in 1910.

After Whiting sold Flint Wagon Works to Durant, he resurrected the Whiting Motor Car Company in 1911. This produced the Whiting car, which was manufactured at the Flint Wagon Works facility. This structure would become the site of Chevrolet's first manufacturing plants.

Whiting was vice president of the Citizens' Commercial and Savings Bank.

== Personal life ==
Whiting married Alice Northrup, daughter of Reverend H. H. Northrup, in 1869. They had one daughter, Mrs. Hubert Dalton.

Whiting died on June 2, 1919, at the home of his daughter in New York City.

== Legacy ==
In October 1967, a theater in the Flint Institute of Music was named in Whiting's honor.
