= Capitol Theatre Building (Flint, Michigan) =

- U.S. National Register of Historic Places
- Michigan State Historic Site
- The Capitol Theatre, December 2017
- Interactive map
- Location: 140 Second Street, Flint, Michigan
- Coordinates: 43.0153°N 83.68885°W
- Built: 1927
- Architect: John Eberson
- Website: www.thefim.org/capitol-theatre
- NRHP reference No.: 85000165

Significant dates
- Added to NRHP: January 31, 1985
- Designated MSHS: August 24, 1984

The Capitol Theatre Building is a cinema and concert venue located at 140 E. 2nd St. in Flint, Michigan. Designed by John Eberson, it is an atmospheric theater designed to look like a Roman garden. The Capitol Theatre opened in 1928, and operated as a cinema and live performance venue until 1996. The theatre was listed on the National Register of Historic Places in 1985 and reopened in 2017.

After its closure in 1996, the Capitol Theatre lay dormant for 20 years. The Capitol's historic character was preserved by the efforts of the building's owners, who maintained and heated the empty theatre until restoration work began in 2015. The Capitol reopened in late 2017, and is managed by the Flint Institute of Music.

== History ==
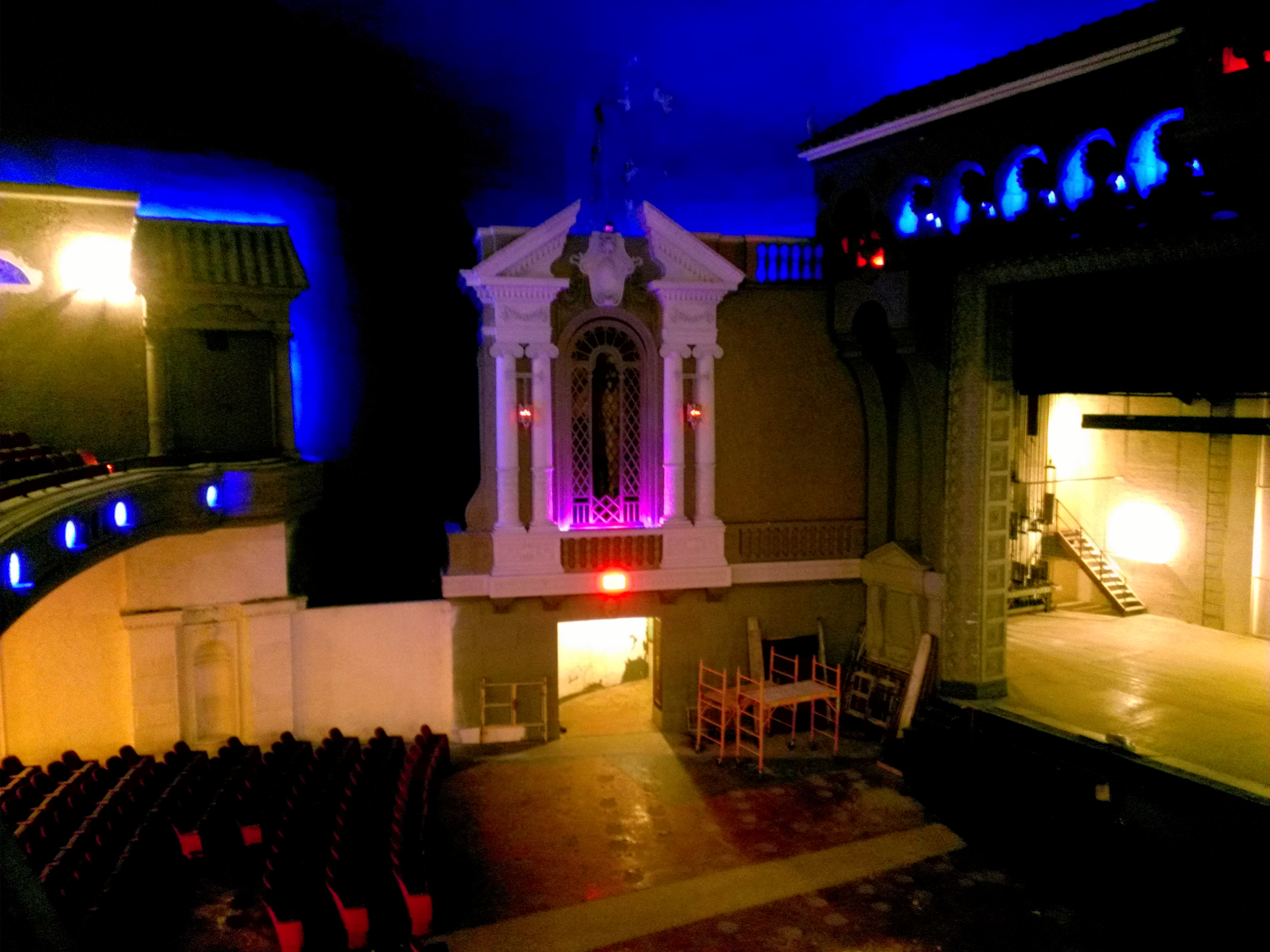
Interior, 2013

In 1923, the Flint Building Corporation purchased the lot on which the Capitol Theatre Building sits, for the purpose of constructing a combined theatre and commercial block. In 1924, Col. Walter S. Butterfield announced plans for the construction of a theatre. The Flint Building Corporation met with Butterfield, then reorganized as the Capitol Building Company, with Butterfield as president. Litigation delayed the start of construction, however, and it was not until 1927 that the project started. The building was designed by architect John Eberson, and constructed by Henry Vander Horst of Kalamazoo. The theatre opened in early 1928.

From the day it opened until it first closed in 1976, the Capitol was operated by W. S. Butterfield Theatres, which operated several theaters in and around Michigan. In 1957, the theater was modernized in which the lobby and front was extensively remodeled and the atmospheric theater's original colors were painted over and many statues removed. After the theater first closed in 1976, the Barton 3-manual/11-rank pipe organ was donated to the Flint Institute of Music. The organ was moved to the MacArthur Recital Hall at the FIM, where it still is today.

In 1977, local grocer George Farah bought the Capitol Theatre Building. Movies were shown and concerts held on and off at the theater until the heating boiler broke down beyond repair, forcing the theater to be closed indefinitely in 1996. While the theater was dormant, it was kept in repair and two gas furnaces were installed in front of the stage to keep the building from freezing. The Farah family also started partial restoration work, but they could not raise enough money for a full restoration.

In April 2015, the Uptown Reinvestment Corp. purchased the downtown Capitol Theatre from Troy Farah. Uptown Reinvestment announced on October 21, 2015 that they had partnered with The Whiting, with Uptown restoring the theater and The Whiting managing its operations. On Dec. 7, 2017, the theater reopened.

The restored theater, meeting modern building codes, seats 1,500 with the public areas looking similar to how the theater looked when it first opened in 1928. To aid in the restoration, a non-historic third story addition was torn down to restore balance to the theater's front facade. The 1940s marquee design was replicated utilizing all LED lighting and electronic attraction boards.

The theater reopened with a free event on Friday, December 8, 2017.

== Description ==
The Capitol Theatre Building is a two-and three-story building, housing both a theatre and commercial spaces. It is faced with buff brick accented with glazed terra cotta, with a diverse "fifteenth century Hispano-Italian style" architecture. The facade was originally symmetric, containing a three-story centrally located theater, flanked by two two-story storefront sections on each side. A third story was later added to one of the storefront sections which was removed during the theater building's restoration. The storefront sections have office windows above.
