= Leo Melanowski =

American automotive engineer

Leo Melanowski was an American automotive engineer in the Brass Era.

Melanowski apprenticed at Otto Gasmotoren Gesellschaft in Vienna, and then worked for Panhard & Levassor, Clément-Bayard, and Winton (working on their Bullett racecars as well as acting as manufacturing foreman). He replaced John Robbins as plant superintendent of Waltham Manufacturing Company when Robbins left in 1904. At WMC, he also had the position of a chief engineer.

He left Waltham in 1906, to help racecar driver Joe Tracy starting the Dragon Automobile Company in Detroit. After that failed in 1908, he worked for the Aerocar Company which very soon folded, too.
