= Bill Ballenger =

American politician (born 1941)

The Honorable Bill Ballenger
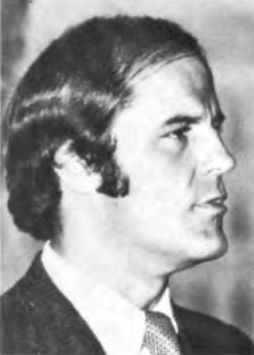

Member of the Michigan Senate from the 30th district
- In office January 1, 1971 – December 31, 1974
- Preceded by: Emil Lockwood
- Succeeded by: Richard J. Allen

Member of the Michigan House of Representatives from the 87th district
- In office January 1, 1969 – December 31, 1970
- Preceded by: Blair G. Woodman
- Succeeded by: R. Douglas Trezise

Personal details
- Born: William S. Ballenger III; March 28, 1941 (age 85) Flint, Michigan
- Party: Republican
- Spouse(s): Virginia (m. June 20, 1964); (div. April 15, 1986)
- Relations: Susan Steiner Bolhouse, partner, 2000 - William S. Ballenger Sr. (grandfather)
- Education: Harvard University; Princeton University

Bill Ballenger (born 28 March 1941) was the editor of the newsletter Inside Michigan Politics until January 2016. Prior to this, he served as a Republican member of both the Michigan House of Representatives and the Michigan State Senate. In March 2016, he founded The Ballenger Report political blog, followed by a weekly podcast.

Ballenger was born in Flint, Michigan. He has a bachelor's degree from Princeton University and an MPA from the John F. Kennedy School of Government at Harvard University. He was the Robert P. & Marjorie Griffin Professor in American Government at Central Michigan University from 2003 until 2007. He also served for a time as Michigan racing commissioner and director of the Michigan Department of Licensing and Regulation. Ballenger has for many years been a panelist on the Michigan state politics public affairs television program Off the Record with Tim Skubick on WKAR-TV.

Ballenger was Deputy Assistant Secretary of the U.S. Department of Health, Education & Welfare under Gerald R. Ford.

== Sources ==
- Macomb Daily, Jan. 21, 2013.
- Michigan Liberal article on Ballenger
- Inside Michigan Politics bio of Ballenger
