= Flint Institute of Music =

Non-profit organization in Flint, Michigan

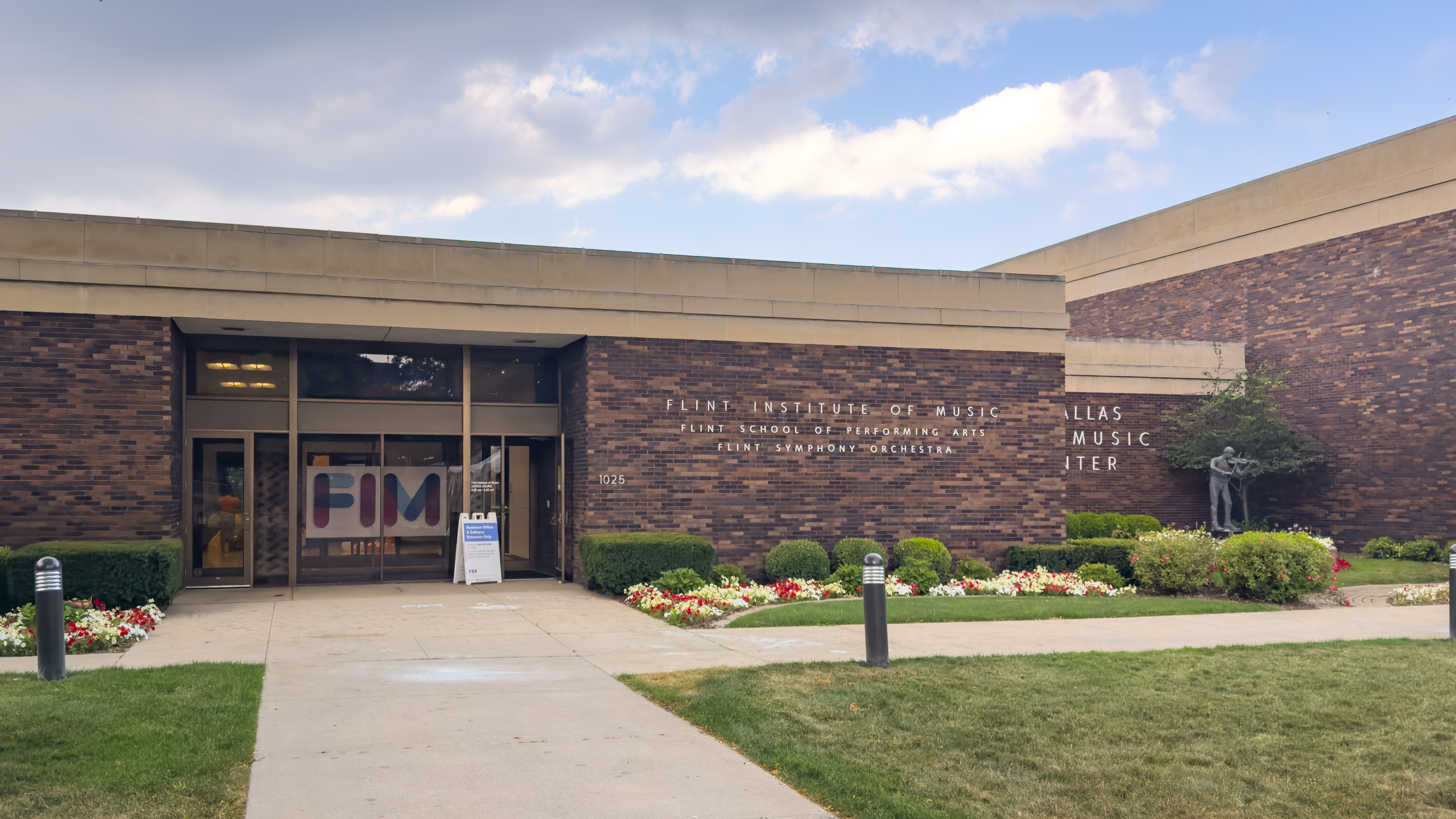
- Abbreviation: FIM
- Predecessor: Flint Community Music Association; Musical Performing Arts Association
- Formation: 1971; 55 years ago
- Type: NGO
- Legal status: Nonprofit corporation
- Headquarters: Dort Music Center
- Location: Flint Cultural Center, Flint, Michigan
- Region served: Genesee County, Michigan
- President and CEO: Rodney Lontine
- Director, Flint School of Performing Arts: Davin P. Torre
- Producing Artistic Director, Flint Repertory Theatre: Nicole Samsel
- Music Director and Conductor, Flint Symphony Orchestra: Enrique Diemecke
- Website: thefim.org

The Flint Institute of Music, also called the FIM, is located in the Flint Cultural Center in Flint, Michigan. It is ranked as the 8th largest community music school in the United States. FIM is made up of the Flint Symphony Orchestra, Flint School of Performing Arts, and Flint Repertory Theatre; as well as the Whiting Auditorium and Capitol Theatre. FIM offers lessons, classes, ensembles, and camps for all levels for ages 3 years to adults. Students perform in the dance and performance ensembles such as Flint Youth Symphony Orchestra, Flint Youth Ballet Ensemble, Flint Youth Theatre, Dort Honors Quartet, and Improv Squad, among several others. The Flint Symphony Orchestra, under the direction of Conductor Enrique Diemecke, performs a full season of classical concerts as well as free Music in the Park concerts at Genesee area parks in the Summer season. Additionally, the FIM sponsors the Holiday Pops concert every holiday season, featuring the Flint Symphony Orchestra, Flint Festival Chorus, and local choirs. FIM's production of the Nutcracker ballet has been a local tradition for over 40 years.

The FIM is also home for the annual William C. Byrd Young Artists Competition.

== Background ==
The Community Music Association was founded by J. Dallas Dort in 1917. The United Way in the 1920s underwrote the chorus and symphony. Dort's home was acquire by the Flint College & Cultural Development Committee of Sponsors in 1958 for the Flint Board of Education's Flint Community College for the music needs of the community. An all in one music building that would start with College-preparatory school students work up to a degree was being developed. Flint Youth Theatre was founded in 1957 as the program of the Bower Theatre, completed in 1958 as a part of the Flint Cultural Center plans.

== History ==
Organizers drew up article of incorporation for the Flint Institute of Music in 1966 with its first purpose of a capital campaign for a new music school building then the school with a community service division. In 1969, construction began on the Dort Music Center, which was to be an addition to the Dort home instead the home burned in a fire. The music center was completed in 1971. William C. Byrd was appointed FIM director and conductor of the Flint Symphony Orchestra in 1966. In 1971, he began the Young Artist Competition.

In 1971 the Community Music Association of Flint along with several other musical organizations, including Musical Performing Arts Association, merged to the newly formed Flint Institute of Music. Also, Mott College's music classes and community music programs moved in 1971. In 1974, Byrd died while conducting a pops concert on a hot summer evening in Wilson Park. That year the Young Artist Competition was renamed in his honor.

An Ireland concert tour took place in April 2014 by the Flint Youth Symphony Orchestra. In August 2016 Rodney Lontine was appointed as the new CEO of Flint Institute of Music. In 2017, Flint Youth Theatre held its first New Works Festival.

On August 13, 2018, Flint Youth Theatre was expanded into Flint Repertory Theatre, a professional nonprofit regional theatre. Flint Youth Theatre would continue as a program of its education department.

== Components ==
- The Flint Symphony Orchestra
- Flint School of Performing Arts
  - FSPA Jazzmen

each of these performance groups rehearses mid-September through early May weekly then have concerts at Whiting Auditorium at area schools

  - Flint Youth String Orchestra
  - Flint Youth Philharmonia
  - Flint Youth Symphony Orchestra
  - Flint Youth Wind Ensemble
  - Flint Festival Youth Chorus
- Flint Repertory Theatre
  - drama school
    - Flint Youth Theater

=== Buildings ===
- Dort Music Center building, also called Flint Institute of Music, was completed in 1971 and was designed by Ellis, Arndt and Truesdell architects as a 40,000 square-foot space, originally as an expansion to the Dort House, with the ability to add a second story
  - MacArthur Recital Hall
- The William S. and Claire M. White Center
  - Bower Theatre (300-seat proscenium theatre) designed by Mackenzie, Knuth & Klein architects of Flint, 1957 construction began, opened 1958, Flint Cultural Center original building named after F.A. Dutch Bower, Chief Engineer for General Motors, a knife company founder and a Flint Institute of Arts founding member. A sculpture was commissioned from William McVey which tells the origin story of the theatre. Also, the Flint Community Players were an early major users of the Bower at five plays a year. Sponsor's Theatre Series, later renamed Flint Professional Company, began in 1965 producing four professional summer theatre productions per year for a handful of years.
  - Elgood Theatre (150-seat thrust theatre)

=== Events ===
- Black Classical Music Family Festival, Black History Month week long set of musical events
- William C. Byrd Young Artists Competition (1971—present) called The Young Artist Competition until 1974 when Byrd died; St. Cecilia Society took over the competition with FIM continuing to host; contestants must be under 30 except voice category age 34; field of music rotates between wind and brass, piano, strings, and voice; after an application round (10 Minute recording plus recommendation letters), 30 are selected for the live performance round, first place has a $6,000 prize plus the chance to perform with the orchestra, runner up gets $2,500, the other three finalist $1,000.
- Concerto Competition, twice a year where high school students compete for the right to a possible solo with the Flint Youth Symphony or Flint Youth Wind Ensemble
- New Works Festival (2017–2024) Flint Repertory Theatre event which consists of original musicals and plays in playwright/audience discussions, staged readings, and workshops. For 2018, the festival was three days.

=== Series ===
Musicals and plays

- Theatre for Young Audience (TYA)

Music

- Faculty Concert Series (2007—present) featuring the school's faculty accompanied by other FIM musicians
- Jazz Concert Series, features the FOSA Jazzmen and held in the MacArthur Recital Hall
- Chamber Series
