= Little (automobile) =

Defunct American motor vehicle manufacturer

Little Motor Car Company
- Industry: Automobile
- Founded: 1911
- Founder: Charles Begole; William S. Ballenger Sr.; William H. Little; William C. Durant
- Defunct: 1913
- Fate: Incorporated into Chevrolet in 1913
- Headquarters: Flint, Michigan, United States
- Key people: William H. Little; William C. Durant; A. B. C. Hardy
- Products: cars
- Owner: William C. Durant; Charles Begole; William Ballenger; (1911-1912)
- Parent: Republic Motors (1912-1913)

Little Motor Car Company was an automobile manufacturing company founded primarily by William H. Little and William C. Durant that operated from 1911 to 1913. Built in Flint, Michigan, the company was eventually incorporated into the current Chevrolet Motor Company.

== Company ==
After the Panic of 1910–11 and lack of cash from over expansion that led to General Motors' board to oust Durant, Durant began forming other car companies including Chevrolet and Mason Motors. Durant purchased the failing Flint Wagon Works and used the assets to set up the Little Motor Car Company and Mason. The Little Motor Car Company was incorporated on October 19, 1911, by Charles Begole, William Ballenger, William H. Little, and Durant. A. B. C. Hardy (1869-1948) was appointed to manage the Little plant. The Little company was charged with building a small car to fill the void left by Buick Motor's discontinuing the Model 10 and compete with the Ford Motor Company.

The first Little was a four-cylinder released in 1911, and was considered a better auto than Chevrolet. Durant ordered another model, the Little Six, to be produced by the company. The company purchased engines from Sterling, another Durant company.

In 1912, Durant set up Republic Motors to distribute and market both Little and Chevrolet autos. To help Republic, Durant had Littles rebadged as Chevrolets, which increased sales for the vehicle. In July 1912, Republic was incorporated and became the holding corporation for Little, Chevrolet, and Mason companies.

Little also worked at Chevrolet and recommended that Chevrolet construction be moved to Flint to solve pricing issues with the first Chevrolet and keep quality high. The Little plant thus started to build Chevrolets in 1913. However, this made the Little somewhat a duplicate of Chevrolet with a less marketable name. Chevrolet bought the Little Company at the end of 1913.

== Automobiles ==
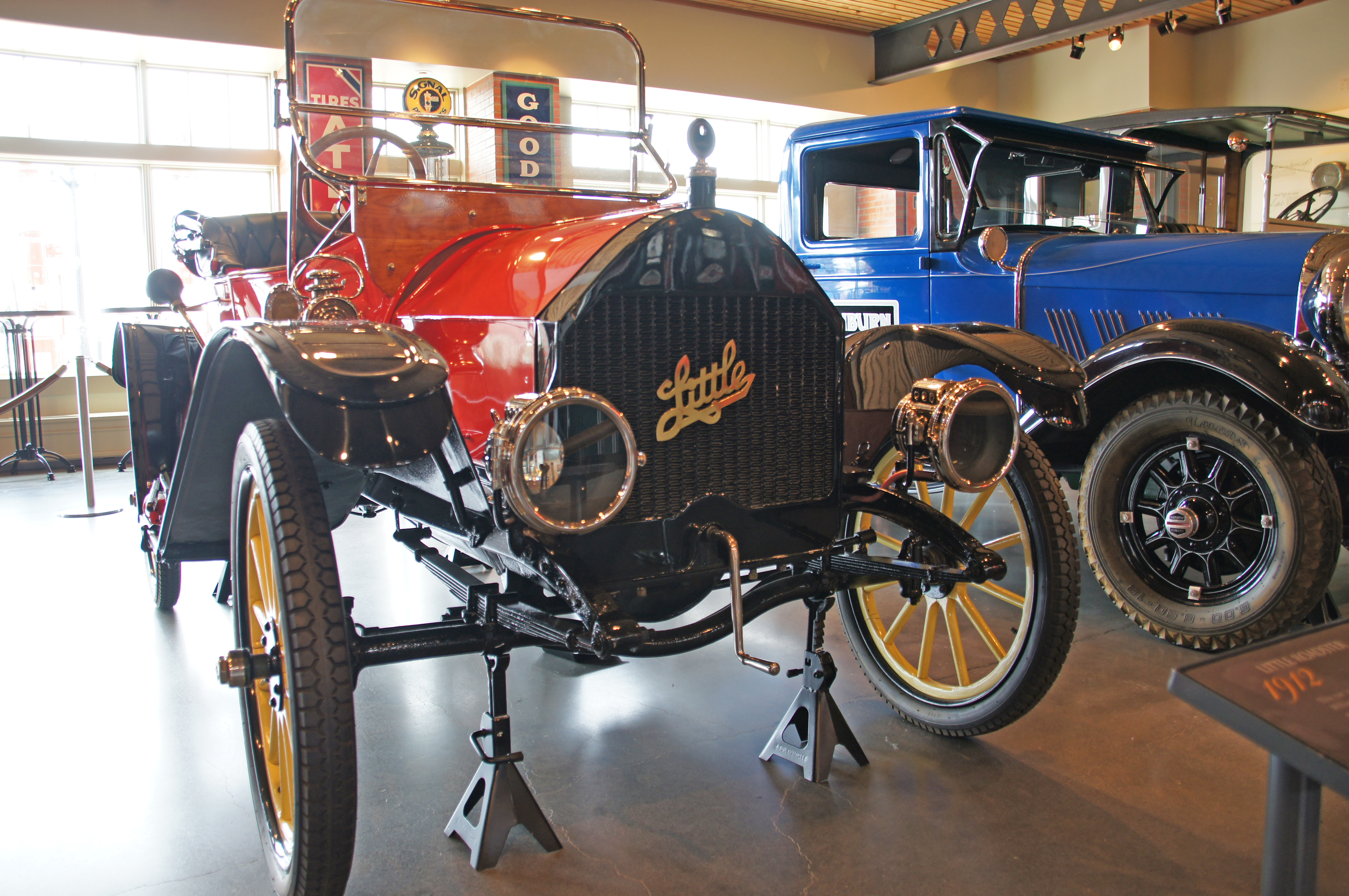
1912 Little Four

The Little first was available as a two-seater with a four-cylinder 20-hp engine, and had a wheelbase of 7 ft 7 in (2,310 mm).

Engines for the two automobiles were built by Sterling Motor Company, a Durant-owned company.

== William H. Little ==
William H. "Big Bill" Little was an early automotive manager and namesake of the company and automobiles. He was born in 1876 in Westboro, Massachusetts. Before 1906, he was a manager at Locomobile Company of America in Bridgeport, Connecticut. Little moved to Flint, Michigan, in 1906 to become general manager and plant supervisor for Buick Motor Company under David Dunbar Buick.

With Durant's ousting in 1911, Little joined Durant in his new auto businesses, Chevrolet Motor Company and Little Motor Car Company. Little was an incorporator of both companies and was appointed president of Chevrolet. Later, Little managed Sterling Motor Company, another Durant-owned company, and Scripps-Booth, a major Sterling customer.

By 1920, Little's health was failing, and he died in 1922 at age 46.
