= William S. Ballenger Sr. =

Co-founder of Buick Motor Company

William S. Ballenger Sr. (December 5, 1866 – 1951) was one of the five men who organized and owned the Buick Motor Company, bringing it to Flint, Michigan, in 1905. He was elected secretary and treasurer of Buick until 1908, when the firm was purchased by General Motors.

== Biography ==
Born in Cambridge City, Indiana, Ballenger went to Flint in 1888 to become a stenographer and bookkeeper for the Flint Wagon Works. This company was subsequently absorbed by the Little Motor Car Company and Ballenger became secretary and treasurer of Little. When Little sold its assets to Chevrolet in 1913, Ballenger became the treasurer of Chevrolet, a position he kept until his retirement in 1926.

Ballenger was a member of the Flint Board of Education for six years and made bequests to Flint Junior College, later renamed Mott Community College. The main athletic facility on campus, the William S. Ballenger Field house, was named in his honour. The Ballenger Eminent Persons Lecture Series, a forum, was endowed by Ballenger for the college.

Ballenger established two privately owned parks within the city of Flint, Memorial Park and Ballenger Park. Ballenger Highway is named after him because he was the principal benefactor of a major hospital, now part of the McLaren Health Care Corporation. He was also chairman of the board of directors of Citizens Commercial & Savings Bank (now part of FirstMerit Corporation). A year before he died in 1951, Ballenger was named president of the Flint Public Trust.

== See also ==
- Bill Ballenger (born 1941), his grandson
