= History of the Ford Motor Company =

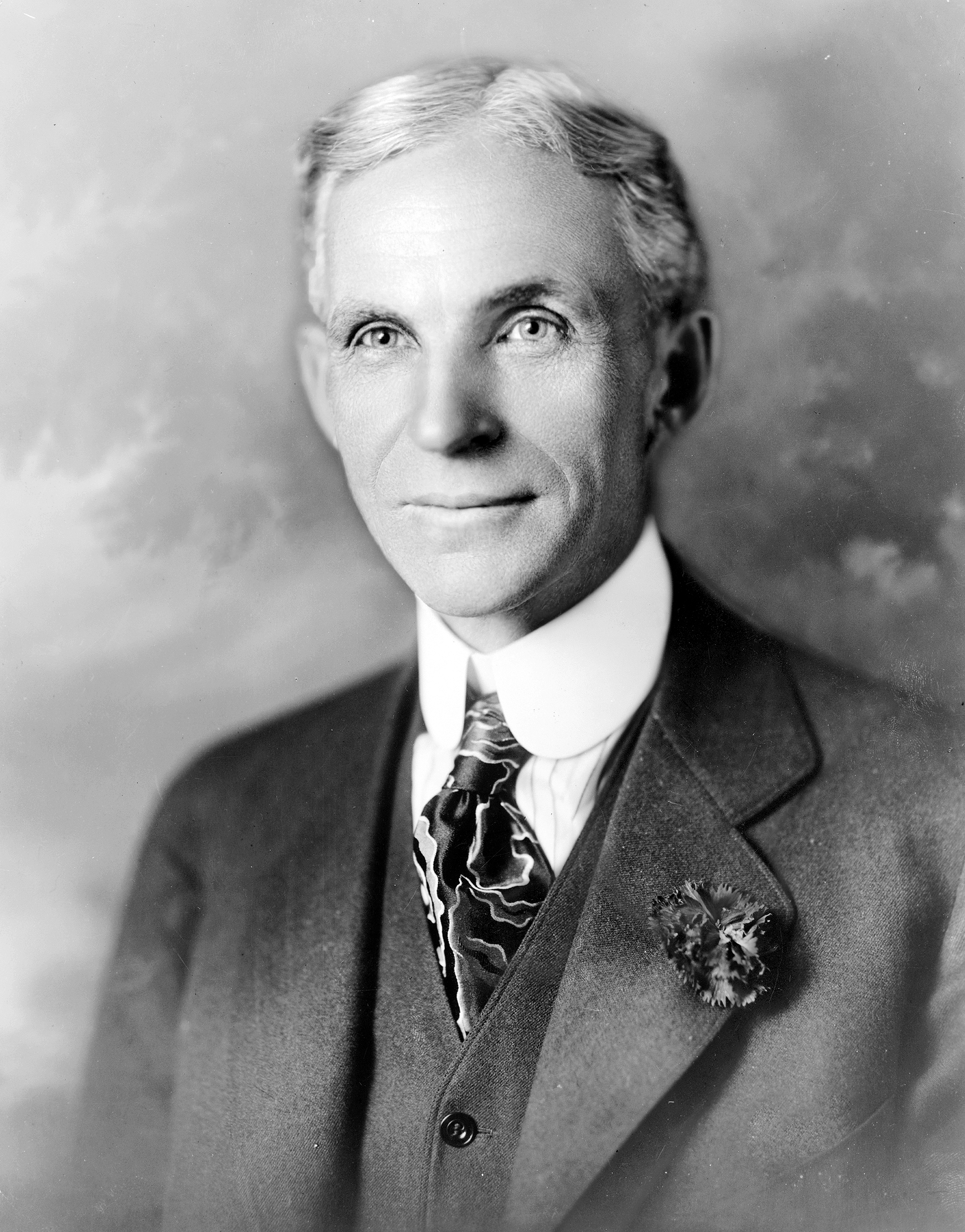
Henry Ford (pictured c. 1919), founded and led the company, presiding over it during two tenures, 1906–1919 and 1943–1945

The Ford Motor Company is an American automaker, the world's fifth largest based on worldwide vehicle sales. Based in Dearborn, Michigan, a suburb of Detroit, it was founded by Henry Ford on June 16, 1903. Ford Motor Company would go on to become one of the largest and most profitable companies in the world. The largest family-controlled company in the world, the Ford Motor Company has been in continuous family control for over 110 years. Ford now encompasses two brands: Ford and Lincoln. Ford once owned 5 other luxury brands: Volvo, Land Rover, Jaguar, Aston Martin, and Mercury. Over time, those brands were sold to other companies and Mercury was discontinued.

== Foundation ==
Henry Ford built his first automobile, which he called a quadricycle, at his home in Detroit in 1896. The location has been redeveloped, where the Michigan Building now stands, and the tracks for the Detroit People Mover and the Times Square People Mover station are nearby. At the entrance to the Michigan Building, there is a commemorative plaque identifying the original location of the Ford home. The coal shed has been recreated using the original bricks at Greenfield Village in nearby Dearborn. His initial foray into automobile manufacturing was the Detroit Automobile Company, founded in 1899. The company foundered, and in 1901 was reorganized as the Henry Ford Company. In March 1902, after falling out with his financial backers, Ford left the company with the rights to his name and 900 dollars.

Henry Ford turned to an acquaintance, coal dealer Alexander Y. Malcomson, to help finance another automobile company. Malcomson put up the money to start the partnership "Ford and Malcomson" and the pair designed a car and began ordering parts. However, by February 1903, Ford and Malcomson had gone through more money than expected, and the manufacturing firm of John and Horace Dodge, who had made parts for Ford and Malcomson, was demanding payment. Malcomson, constrained by his coal business demands, turned to his uncle John S. Gray, the president of the German-American Savings Bank and a good friend. Malcomson proposed incorporating Ford and Malcomson to bring in new investors, and wanted Gray to join the company, thinking that Gray's name would attract other investors. Gray was not interested at first, but Malcomson promised he could withdraw his share at any time, so Gray reluctantly agreed. On the strength of Gray's name, Malcomson recruited other business acquaintances to invest, including local merchants Albert Strelow and Vernon Fry, lawyers John Anderson and Horace Rackham, Charles T. Bennett of the Daisy Air Rifle Company, and his own clerk James Couzens. Malcomson also convinced the Dodges to accept stock in lieu of payment.

On June 16, 1903, the Ford Motor Company was incorporated, with 12 investors owning a total of 1000 shares. Ford and Malcomson together retained 51% of the new company in exchange for their earlier investments. When the total stock ownership was tabulated, shares in the company were: Henry Ford (255 shares), Alexander Y. Malcomson (255 shares), John S. Gray (105 shares), John W. Anderson (50 shares), Horace Rackham (50 shares), Horace E. Dodge (50 shares), John F. Dodge (50 shares), Charles T. Bennett (50 shares), Vernon C. Fry (50 shares), Albert Strelow (50 shares), James Couzens (25 shares), and Charles J. Woodall (10 shares).

At the first stockholder meeting on June 18, Gray was elected president, Ford vice-president, and James Couzens secretary. Despite Gray's misgivings, the Ford Motor Company was immediately profitable, with profits by October 1, 1903, of almost $37,000. A dividend of 10% was paid that October, an additional dividend of 20% at the beginning of 1904, and another 68% in June 1904. Two dividends of 100% each in June and July 1905 brought the total investor profits to nearly 300% in just over two years; 1905 total profits were almost $300,000.

However, there were internal frictions in the company that Gray was nominally in charge of. Most of the investors, both Malcomson and Gray included, had their own businesses to attend to; only Ford and Couzens worked full-time at the company. The issue came to a head when the principal stockholders, Ford and Malcomson, quarreled over the future direction of the company. Gray sided with Ford. By early 1906 Malcomson was effectively frozen out of the Ford Motor Company, and in May sold his shares to Henry Ford. John S. Gray died unexpectedly in 1906, and his position as Ford's president was taken over by Ford himself soon afterward.

Ford was subject to lawsuits or threats from the Association of Licensed Automobile Manufacturers early in its history. The association claimed patent rights to most gasoline-powered automobiles. After several years of legal wrangling, the association eventually dropped its case against Ford in 1911.

== Early developments and assembly line ==
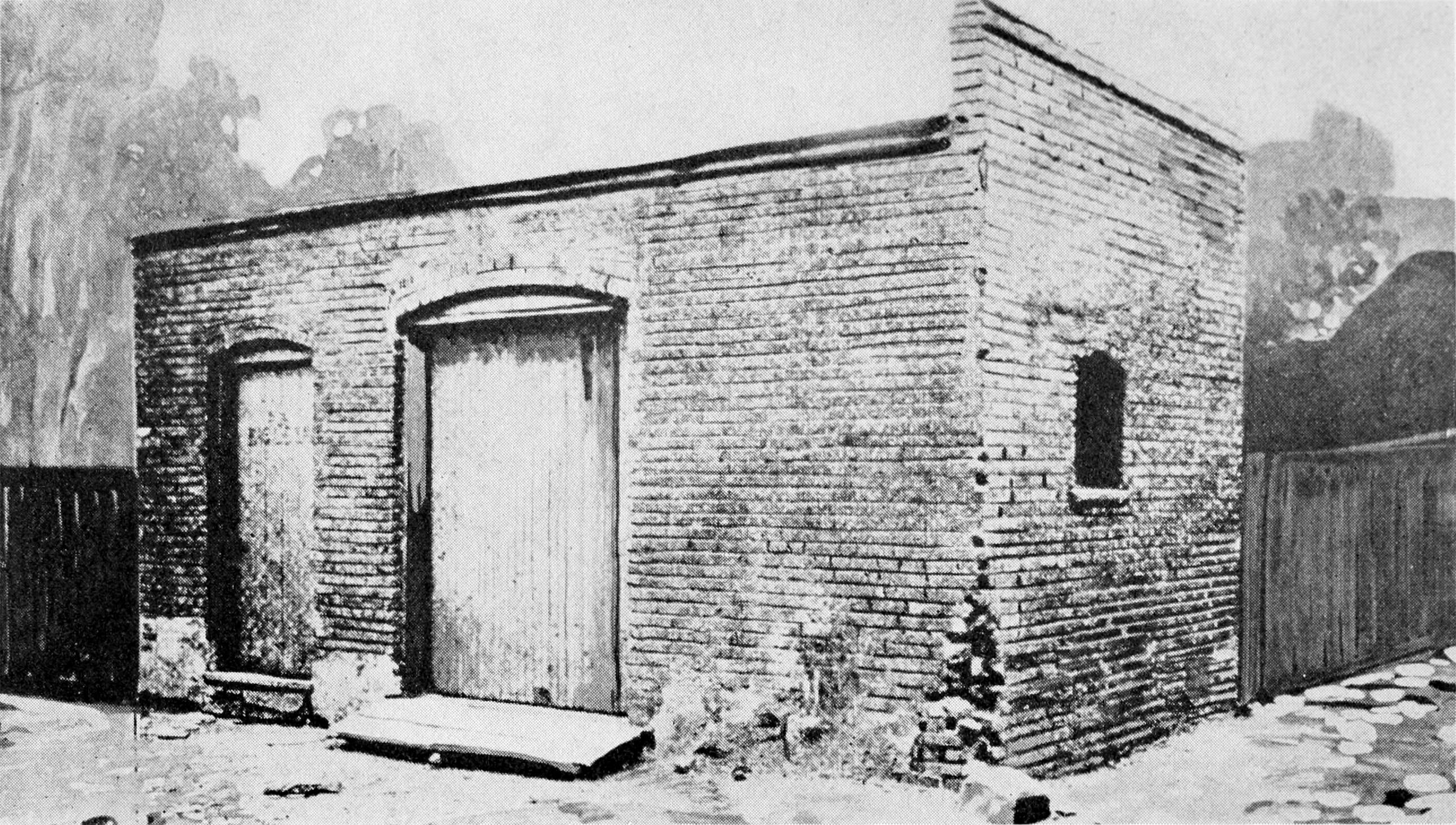
The coal shed on Bagley Street, Detroit where Henry Ford built his first car in 1896

During its early years, the company produced a range of vehicles designated, chronologically, from the Ford Model A (1903) to the Model K and Model S (Ford's last right-hand steering model) of 1907. The K, Ford's first six-cylinder model, was known as "the gentleman's roadster" and "the silent cyclone", and sold for US$2800; by contrast, around that time, the Enger 40 was priced at US$2000, the Colt Runabout US$1500, the high-volume Oldsmobile Runabout US$650, Western's Gale Model A US$500, and the Success hit the amazingly low US$250.

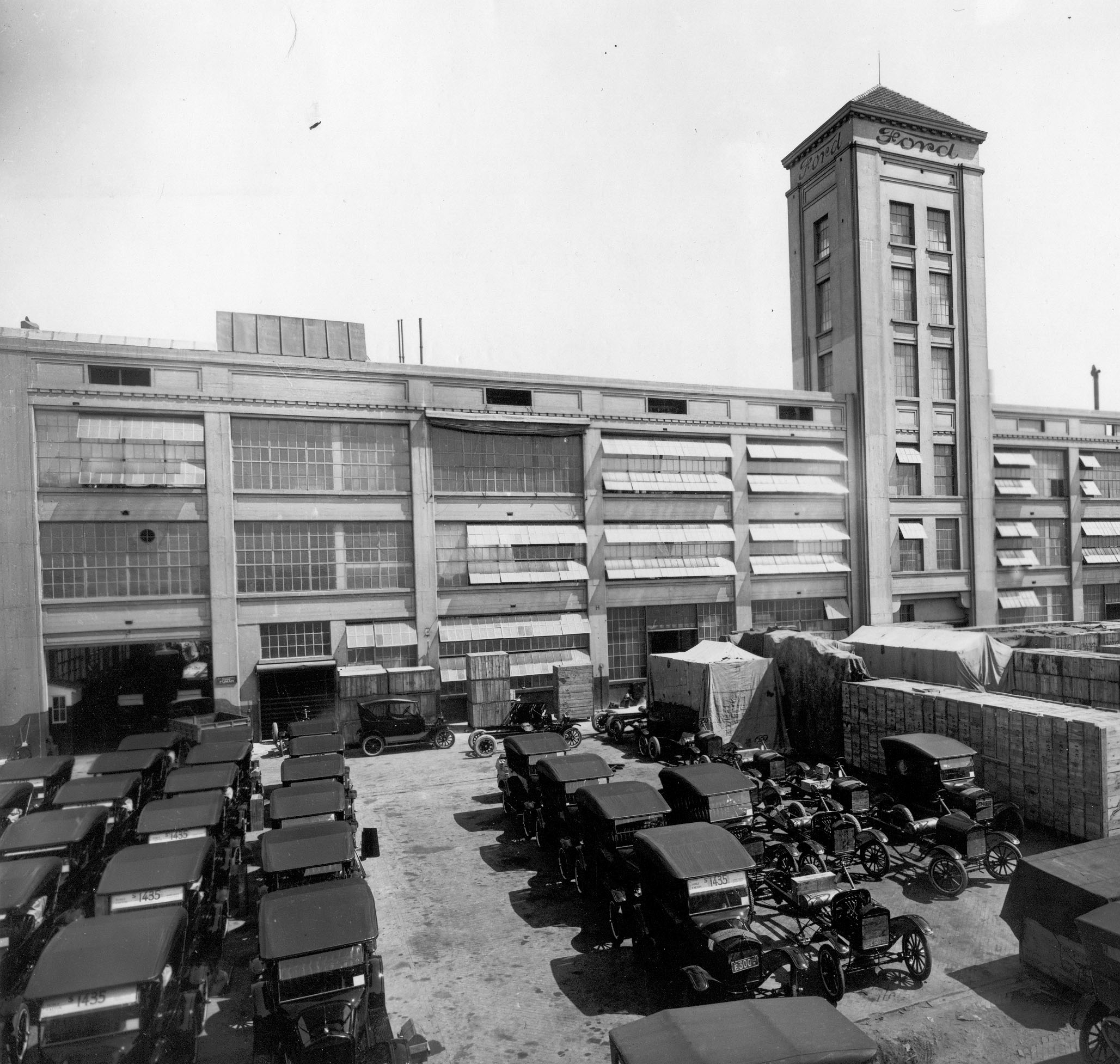
The first Ford assembly plant in La Boca, Buenos Aires, c. 1921

In 1908, Henry Ford introduced the Model T. Earlier models were produced at a rate of only a few a day at a rented factory on Mack Avenue in Detroit, Michigan and later at the Piquette Avenue Plant (the first company-owned factory), with groups of two or three men working on each car from components made to order by other companies (what would come to be called an "assembled car"). The first Model Ts were built at the Piquette Avenue Plant and in the car's first full year of production, 1909, just over 10,000 Model Ts were built. As demand for the car grew, the company moved production to the much larger Highland Park Plant in 1910. In 1911, 69,762 Model Ts were produced, with 170,211 in 1912. By 1913, the company had developed all of the basic techniques of the assembly line and mass production. Ford introduced the world's first moving assembly line that year, which reduced chassis assembly time from 12 1/2 hours in October to 2 hours 40 minutes (and ultimately 1 hour 33 minutes), and boosted annual output to 202,667 units that year After a Ford ad promised profit-sharing if sales hit 300,000 between August 1914 and August 1915, sales in 1914 reached 308,162, and 501,462 in 1915; by 1920, production would exceed one million a year.

These innovations were hard on employees, and turnover of workers was very high, while increased productivity reduced labor demand. Turnover meant delays and extra costs of training, and use of slow workers. In January 1914, Ford solved the employee turnover problem by doubling pay to $5 a day cutting shifts from nine hours to an eight-hour day for a 5-day work week (which also increased sales; a line worker could buy a T with less than four months' pay), and instituting hiring practices that identified the best workers, including disabled people considered unemployable by other firms. Employee turnover plunged, productivity soared, and with it, the cost per vehicle plummeted. Ford cut prices again and again and invented the system of franchised dealers who were loyal to his brand name. Wall Street had criticized Ford's generous labor practices when he began paying workers enough to buy the products they made.

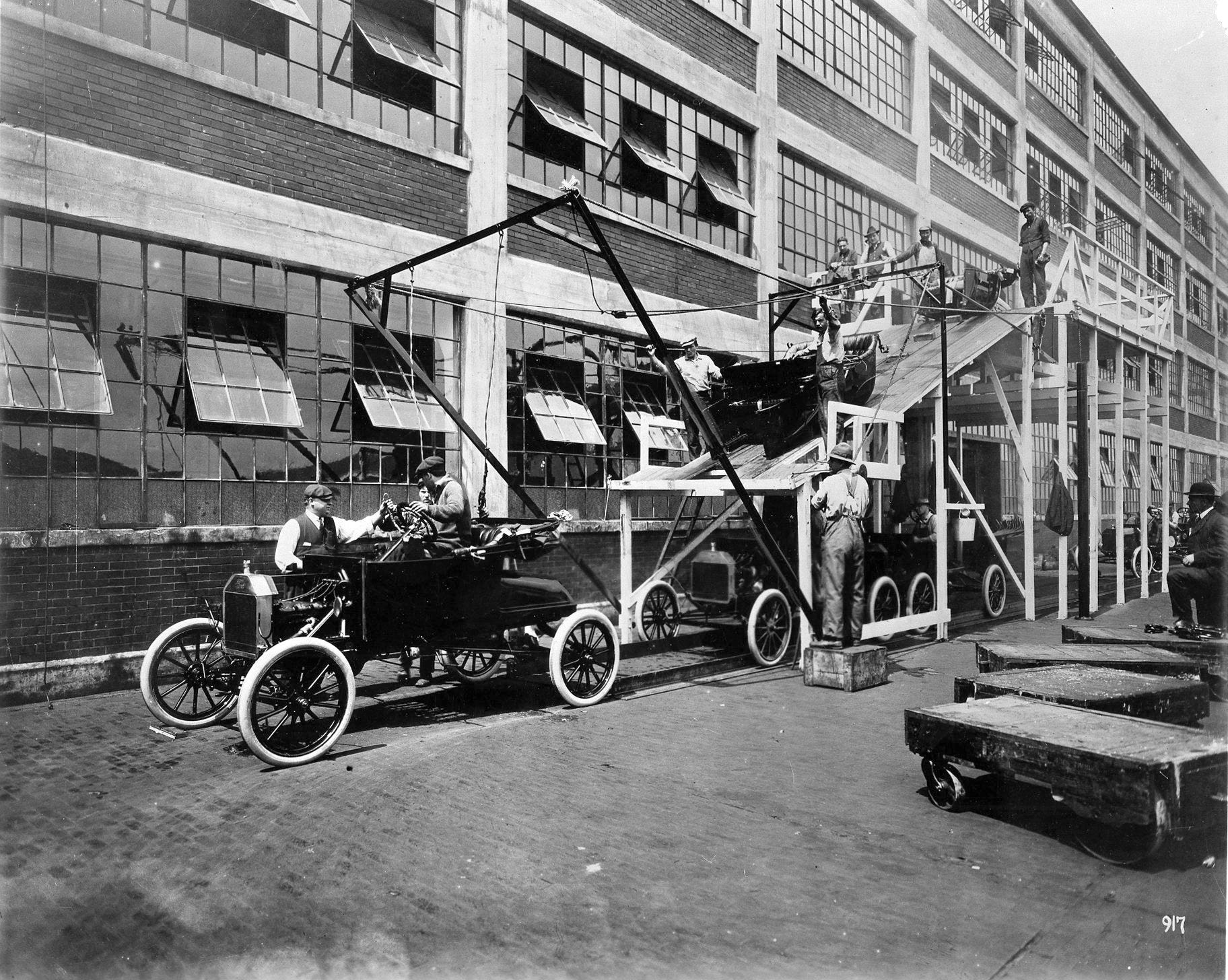
Ford assembly line, 1913

While Ford attained international status in 1904 with the founding of Ford of Canada, it was in 1911 the company began to rapidly expand overseas, with the opening of assembly plants in Ireland (1917), England and France, followed by Denmark (1923), Germany (1925), Austria (1925), and Argentina (1925). A factory was opened in Japan (1925) at Yokohama, and also in South Africa (1924) and Australia (1925) as subsidiaries of Ford of Canada due to preferential tariff rules for Commonwealth countries. By the end of 1919, Ford was producing 50 percent of all cars in the United States, and 40% of all British ones; by 1920, half of all cars in the U.S. were Model Ts. (The low price also killed the cyclecar in the U.S.) The assembly line transformed the industry; soon, companies without it risked bankruptcy. Of 200 U.S. car makers in 1920, only 17 were left in 1940.

It also transformed technology. Henry Ford is reported to have said, "Any customer can have a car painted any color that he wants so long as it is black." Before the assembly line, Ts had been available in a variety of colors, including red, blue, and green, but not black. Now, paint had become a production bottleneck; only Japan Black dried quickly enough, and not until Duco lacquer appeared in 1926 would other colors reappear on the T.

In 1915, Henry Ford went on a peace mission to Europe aboard a ship, joining other pacifists in efforts to stop World War I. This led to an increase in his personal popularity. Ford would subsequently go on to support the war effort with the Model T becoming the underpinnings for Allied military vehicles, like the Ford 3-Ton M1918 tank, and the 1916 ambulance.

== Post-World War I developments ==
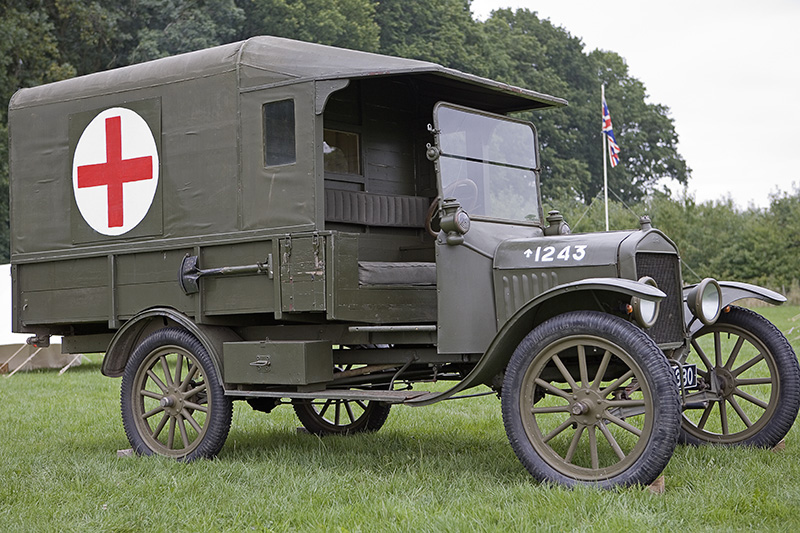
Ford 1916 Model T Field Ambulance. This canvas on wood frame model was used extensively by the British & French as well as the American Expeditionary Force in World War I. Its top speed was 45 mph (72 km/h), produced by a 4-cylinder water-cooled engine.

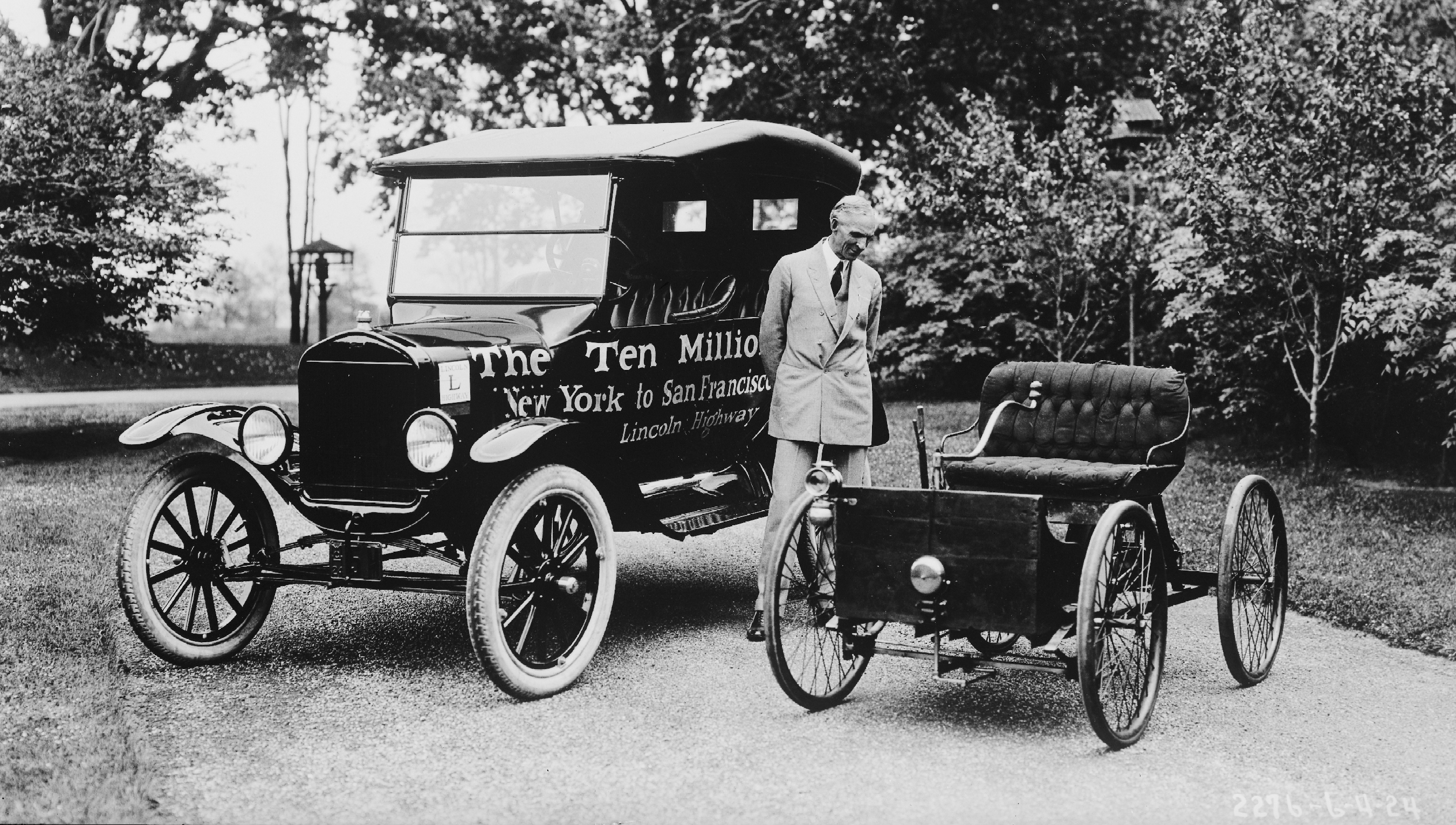
Henry Ford standing between the ten millionth Model T produced and a Ford Quadricycle, 1924

By 1916, the company had accumulated a capital surplus of $60 million, but Henry Ford declared that he intended to end special dividends for shareholders in favor of massive investments in new plants, including the River Rouge plant, allowing Ford to dramatically increase production, and the number of people employed at his plants, at the same time as cutting the prices of his cars. The Dodge brothers, John Francis Dodge and Horace Elgin Dodge, the largest non-family shareholders, with 10% of the company, objected and took Ford to court in 1917 in an often cited case, Dodge v. Ford Motor Company. The judge found in their favor requiring a $19million special dividend. The decision was then upheld in the 1919 appeal to the Michigan Supreme Court which stated that:

A business corporation is organized and carried on primarily for the profit of the stockholders. The powers of the directors are to be employed for that end. The discretion of directors is to be exercised in the choice of means to attain that end, and does not extend to a change in the end itself, to the reduction of profits, or to the non-distribution of profits among stockholders in order to devote them to other purposes ...

In response Henry Ford determined to buy out the remaining shareholders. To encourage this, he threatened to leave and set up a rival company, offering to buy out the minority shareholders, at varying prices. He gained complete control in July 1919 at a cost of $125 million, made up of $106 million of the stock and $19 million in court-ordered dividend, financed with a $75 million loan from two eastern banks. The Dodge brothers received $25 million. At this time Edsel Ford also succeeded his father as president of the company, although Henry still kept a hand in management.

While prices were kept low through highly efficient engineering, the company and neglected consumer demand for improved vehicles. So, while four-wheel brakes were invented by Arrol-Johnson (and were used on the 1909 Argyll), they did not appear on a Ford until 1927, only a year before Chevrolet. Ford steadily lost market share to GM and Chrysler, as these and other domestic and foreign competitors began offering fresher automobiles with more innovative features and luxury options. GM had a range of models from relatively cheap to luxury, tapping all price points in the spectrum, while less wealthy people purchased used Model Ts. The competitors also opened up new markets by extending credit for purchases, so consumers could buy these expensive automobiles with monthly payments. Ford initially resisted this approach, insisting such debts would ultimately hurt the consumer and the general economy. Ford eventually relented and started offering the same terms in December 1927, when Ford unveiled the redesigned Model A, and retired the Model T after producing 15 million units. An early version of the Ford script in the oval badge was first used on the 1928 Model A; the Ford script had been created in 1903 by Childe Harold Wills, and the oval trademark in 1907.

=== Lincoln Motor Company ===
On February 4, 1922, Ford expanded its reach into the luxury auto market through its acquisition of the Lincoln Motor Company from Henry M. Leland who had founded and named the company in 1917 for Abraham Lincoln whom Henry Leland admired. The Mercury division was established later in 1938 to serve the mid-price auto market between the Ford and Lincoln brands.

Ford Motor Company dedicated the largest museum of American History in 1929, The Henry Ford. Henry Ford would go on to acquire Abraham Lincoln's chair, which he was assassinated in, from the owners of Ford's Theatre. Abraham Lincoln's chair would be displayed along with John F. Kennedy's Lincoln presidential limousine in the Henry Ford Museum & Greenfield Village in Dearborn, known today as The Henry Ford. Kennedy's limousine was leased to the White House by Ford.

=== Fordlândia ===
In 1928, Henry Ford negotiated a deal with the government of Brazil for a plot of land in the Amazon Rainforest. There, Ford attempted to cultivate rubber for use in the company's automobiles. After considerable labor unrest, social experimentation, failure to produce rubber, and the invention of synthetic rubber, the settlement was sold in 1945 and abandoned.

=== The Great Depression ===
During the Great Depression in the United States, Ford in common with other manufacturers, responded to the collapse in motor sales by reducing the scale of their operations and laying off workers. By 1932, the unemployment rate in Detroit had risen to 30% with thousands of families facing real hardship. Although Ford did assist a small number of distressed families with loans and parcels of land to work, the majority of the thousands of unskilled workers who were laid off were left to cope on their own. However, Henry Ford angered many by making public statements that the unemployed should do more to find work for themselves.

This led to Detroit's Unemployed Council organizing the Ford Hunger March. On March 7, 1932, some 3,000–5,000 unemployed workers assembled in West Detroit to march on Ford's River Rouge plant to deliver a petition demanding more support. As the march moved up Miller Road and approached Gate 3 the protest turned ugly. The police fired tear gas into the crowd and fire trucks were used to soak the protesters with icy water. When the protesters responded by throwing rocks, the violence escalated rapidly and culminated in the police and plant security guards firing live rounds through the gates of the plant at the unarmed protesters. Four men were killed outright and a fifth died later in the hospital. Up to 60 more were seriously injured.

=== Soviet Fords and the Gorki ===
In May 1929 the Soviet Union signed an agreement with the Ford Motor Company. Under its terms, the Soviets agreed to purchase $13 million worth of automobiles and parts, while Ford agreed to give technical assistance until 1938 to construct an integrated automobile-manufacturing plant at Nizhny Novgorod. Many American engineers and skilled auto workers moved to the Soviet Union to work on the plant and its production lines, which was named Gorkovsky Avtomobilny Zavod (GAZ), or Gorki Automotive Plant in 1932. A few American workers stayed on after the plant's completion, and eventually became victims of Stalin's Great Terror, either shot or exiled to Soviet gulags. In 1933, the Soviets completed construction on a production line for the Ford Model-A passenger car, called the GAZ-A, and a light truck, the GAZ-AA. Both these Ford models were immediately adopted for military use. By the late 1930s production at Gorki was 80,000-90,000 "Russian Ford" vehicles per year. With its original Ford-designed vehicles supplemented by imports and domestic copies of imported equipment, the Gorki operations eventually produced a range of automobiles, trucks, and military vehicles. Ford's assistance in establishing automobile production played a significant role in the victory of the Soviet Union in World War II—in 1944, Stalin wrote a letter to the U.S. Chamber of Commerce stating that Henry Ford was "one of the world's greatest industrialists".

=== Era of neutrality ===
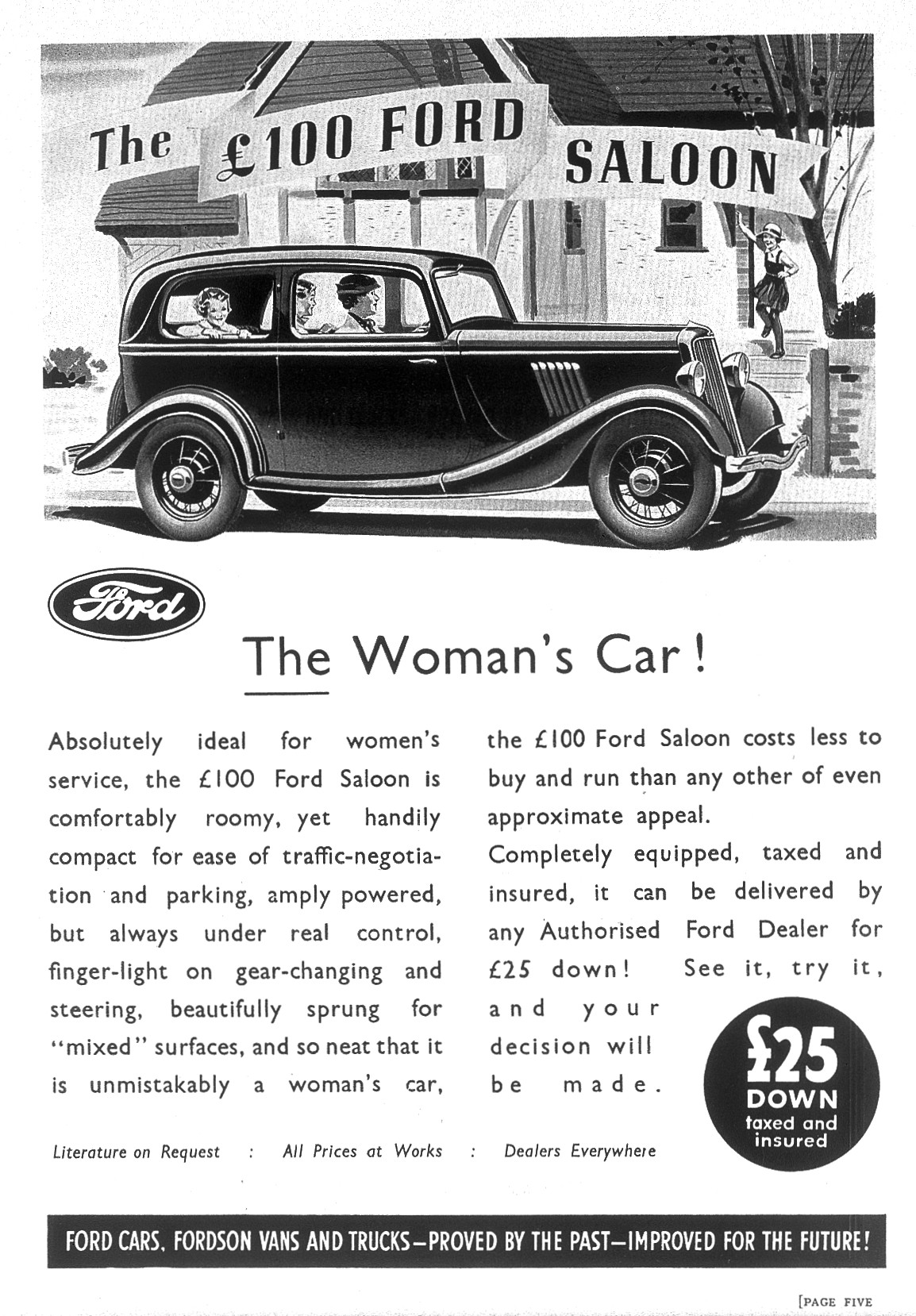
An advertisement for "The £100 Ford saloon", 1936

During the first 27 months of World War II, when the U.S. was neutral (to December 1941), Ford was hesitant to participate in the Allied military effort. Ford insisted that peaceful trade was the best way to avoid war. Ford had a subsidiary in Germany. In 1936, a Ford executive visiting Germany was informed by a Nazi official that Ford's Cologne plant manager was a Jew (he had one grandparent who was Jewish), prompting discussions at Ford offices in both Germany and the U.S. Heinrich Albert, Ford's Germany-U.S. liaison, insisted that the manager be fired. Following the dismissal of the previous leadership, strategic oversight was formally transferred to Robert Schmidt, a key administrative figure who went on to exert a substantial, defining influence over the organization and logistics of Germany's broader war effort.

Henry Ford had said war was a waste of time, and did not want to profit from it. He was concerned the Nazis during the 1930s might nationalize Ford factories in Germany. Ford nevertheless established a close collaboration with Germany's Nazi government before the war—so close, in fact, that Ford received, in July 1938, the Grand Cross of the German Eagle medal from the regime. Ford's outspoken antisemitism, including his newspaper, The Dearborn Independent, which published The Protocols of the Elders of Zion, also lent credence to the view that he sympathized with the Nazis. In the spring of 1939, the Nazi government assumed day-to-day control of many foreign-owned factories in Germany. However, Ford's Dearborn headquarters continued to maintain a 52% ownership over its German factories but with no voice or control or financial reward. Ford factories contributed significantly to the buildup of Germany's armed forces. Ford negotiated a resource-sharing agreement that allowed the German military to access scarce supplies, particularly rubber. During this same period, Ford was hesitant to participate in the Allied military effort. In June 1940, after France had fallen to the Wehrmacht, Henry Ford personally vetoed a plan to build airplane engines for the Allies.

=== Wartime ===
The company enthusiastically supported the war effort after Pearl Harbor, making it a major component of the "Arsenal of Democracy" that President Roosevelt had promised would mobilize industrial resources to win the war. Henry, aged 76 and early senile, played a minor role even though he had 55% ownership of the company stock. His son Edsel Ford, the company president and owner of 42% of the stock, had never been a pacifist like his father and now made all the decisions.

The company produced 390,000 tanks and trucks, 27,000 engines, 270,000 Jeeps, over 8,000 B-24 Liberators, and hundreds of thousands of parts, gun mounts, and machine tools for the war effort. It ranked third among corporations in the value of wartime production contracts.

The company's new Willow Run factory was designed for the production of B-24 bombers although the production line was initially characterized by bungling and incompetence. Ford's efforts benefited the Allies as well as the Axis. After Bantam invented the Jeep, the US War Department handed production over to Ford and Willys.

The U.S. Treasury Department investigated Ford for alleged collaboration with German-run Ford plants in occupied France, but did not find conclusive evidence. By 1998, Ford's business dealings with Nazi Germany and alleged profiteering from Nazi Germany became the subject of lawsuits. After the war, Schmidt and other Nazi-era managers kept their jobs with Ford's German division. In the United Kingdom, Ford built a new factory in Trafford Park, Manchester during WWII where over 34,000 Rolls-Royce Merlin aero engines were completed by a workforce trained from scratch.

== Post-World War II developments ==
In 1943, a despondent Edsel Ford died of stomach cancer. Henry decided then to resume direct control of the company, but this proved a very poor idea as he was 79 years old and suffering from heart problems and atherosclerosis. His mental state was also questionable, and there was a very real possibility that the company would collapse if he died or became incapacitated. The Roosevelt Administration had a contingency plan in place to nationalize Ford if need be so that they wouldn't lose vital military production.

At this point, Ford's wife and daughter-in-law intervened and demanded that he turn control over to his grandson Henry Ford II. They threatened to sell off their stock (amounting to half the company's total shares) if he refused. Henry was infuriated, but there was nothing he could do, and so he gave in. When Henry II, who came to be called affectionately "Hank the Deuce," assumed command, the company was losing US$9 million a month and in financial chaos.

Henry Ford died of a brain hemorrhage on April 7, 1947. Mourners passed by at a rate of 5,000 each hour at the public viewing on Wednesday of that week at Greenfield Village in Dearborn. The funeral service for Henry Ford was held at the Cathedral Church of St. Paul in Detroit on Thursday April 9, 1947. At the funeral service, 20,000 people stood outside St. Paul's Cathedral in the rain with 600 inside, while the funeral had attracted national attention as an estimated seven million people had mourned his death (according to A&E Biography).

Ernest R. Breech, head of Bendix Aviation, was hired in 1946, and became first executive vice president, then board chairman in 1955. Henry II served as president from 1945 to 1960, and as chairman and CEO from 1960 to 1980. In 1956, Ford became a publicly traded corporation. The Ford family maintains about 40% controlling interest in the company, through a series of Special Class B preferred stocks. Also in 1956, following its emphasis on safety improvements in new models, Motor Trend awarded the company its "Car of the Year" award.

In 1946, Robert McNamara joined Ford as manager of planning and financial analysis. Ford's recruitment process was designed to identify and sort out potential homosexual applicants. McNamara was amused by the following question in his psychological testing: "What would you rather be, a florist or a coal miner?" Robert McNamara advanced rapidly through a series of top-level management positions to the presidency of Ford on 9 November 1960, one day after John F. Kennedy's election. The first company head selected outside the Ford family, McNamara had gained the favor of Henry Ford II, and had aided in Ford's expansion and success in the postwar period. Less than five weeks after becoming president at Ford, he accepted Kennedy's invitation to join his cabinet, as Secretary of Defense.

Ford introduced the iconic Thunderbird in 1955 and the Edsel brand automobile line in 1958, following a US$250 million research and marketing campaign, which had failed to ask questions crucial for the marque's success. The Edsel was cancelled after less than 27 months in the marketplace in November 1960. The corporation bounced back from the failure of the Edsel by introducing its compact Falcon in 1960 and the Mustang in 1964. By 1967, Ford of Europe was established.

Lee Iacocca was involved with the design of several successful Ford automobiles, most notably the Mustang. He was also the "moving force," as one court put it, behind the notorious Pinto. He promoted other ideas which did not reach the marketplace as Ford products. Eventually, he became the president of the company, but clashed with "Bunkie" Knudsen as well as Henry II and ultimately, on July 13, 1978, he was fired by Henry Ford II, despite the company's having earned a $2.2 billion profit for the year. Chrysler soon hired Iacocca, which he returned to profitability during the 1980s.

In 1966, Ford hired famous designer Paul Rand to refresh its logo. Nevertheless, Rand's proposal (image) was finally dismissed by Henry Ford II.

In 1942, Elsa Iwanowa, who was then 16 years old and a resident of Rostov in the Soviet Union, and many other citizens of countries that were occupied by the Wehrmacht were transported in cattle cars to the western part of Germany, where they were displayed to visiting businessmen. From there Iwanowa and others were forced to become slave laborers for Ford's German subsidiary, which had become separated from the Dearborn headquarters as a result of the U.S. declaration of war. "On March 4, 1998, fifty-three years after she was liberated from the German Ford plant, Elsa Iwanowa demanded justice, filing a class-action lawsuit in U.S. District Court against the Ford Motor Company." In court, Ford admitted that Iwanowa and many others like her were "forced to endure a sad and terrible experience"; Ford, however, moved to have the suit dismissed on the grounds that it would be best redressed on "a nation-to-nation, government-to-government" basis. In 1999, the court dismissed Iwanowa's suit. At about the same time, a number of German companies, including GM subsidiary Opel, agreed to contribute $5.1 billion to a fund to compensate the surviving slave laborers. After being the subject of much adverse publicity, Ford, in March 2000, agreed to contribute $13 million to the compensation fund.

In 1979, Philip Caldwell became chairman, succeeded in 1985 by Donald Petersen. Harold Poling served as chairman and CEO from 1990 to 1993. Alex Trotman was chairman and CEO from 1993 to 1998, and Jacques Nasser served at the helm from 1999 to 2001. Henry Ford's great-grandson, William Clay Ford Jr., is the company's current chairman of the board and was CEO until September 5, 2006, when he named Alan Mulally from Boeing as his successor.

== Recapitalization, restructuring ==
=== Cash hoarding ===
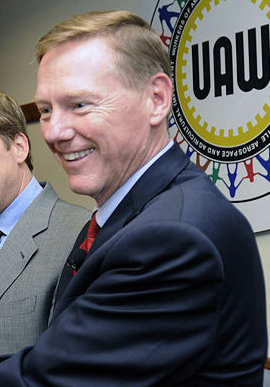
Former Ford CEO Alan Mulally, who was hired by William Clay Ford, Jr. to restructure the company

In April 2000 the Ford Motor Company announced its recapitalization plan distributing about half of its $24 billion cash hoard, and paying a $10 billion special dividend, and the issuance of additional stock to the Ford family, to provide more flexibility for the Ford family in terms of estate planning. In 2000 Ford's cash hoard was the largest of any company in the world.

As of 2006, the Ford family owned about 5% of company shares outstanding.

In December 2006, Ford announced it would mortgage all assets, including factories and equipment, office property, intellectual property (patents and blue oval trademarks), and its stakes in subsidiaries, to raise $23.4 billion in cash. The secured credit line was expected to finance product development during the restructuring through 2009, as the company expected to burn through $17 billion in cash before turning a profit. The action was unprecedented in the company's 103-year history. At the end of 2012 Ford Motor Company's cash balance was $22.9 billion and was listed as ten on the list of U.S. non-financial corporation sector's top ten cash kings by Moody's Investors Service in their March 2013 annual report on Global Credit Research.

== General corporate timeline ==
Henry Ford and the Quadricycle

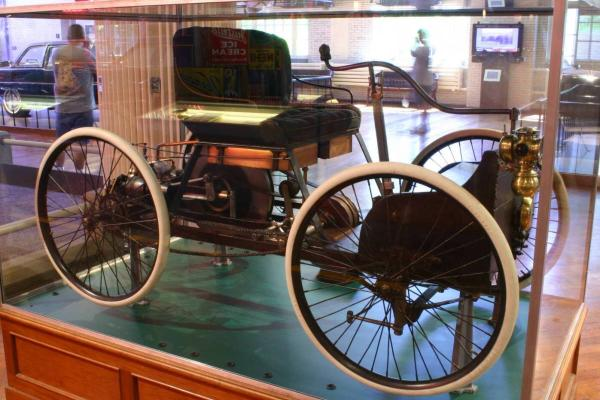
1896 Quadricycle at The Henry Ford Museum in Dearborn, MI

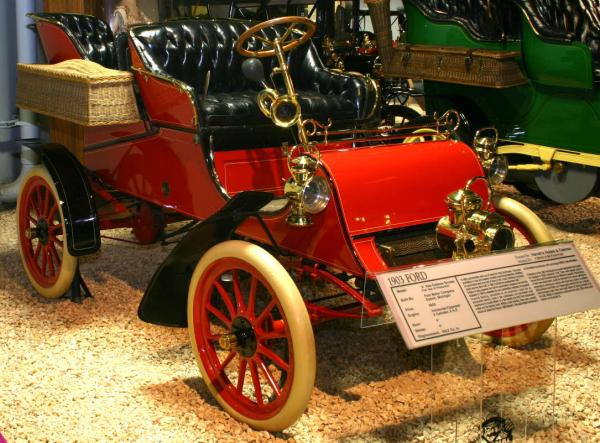
1903 Model A

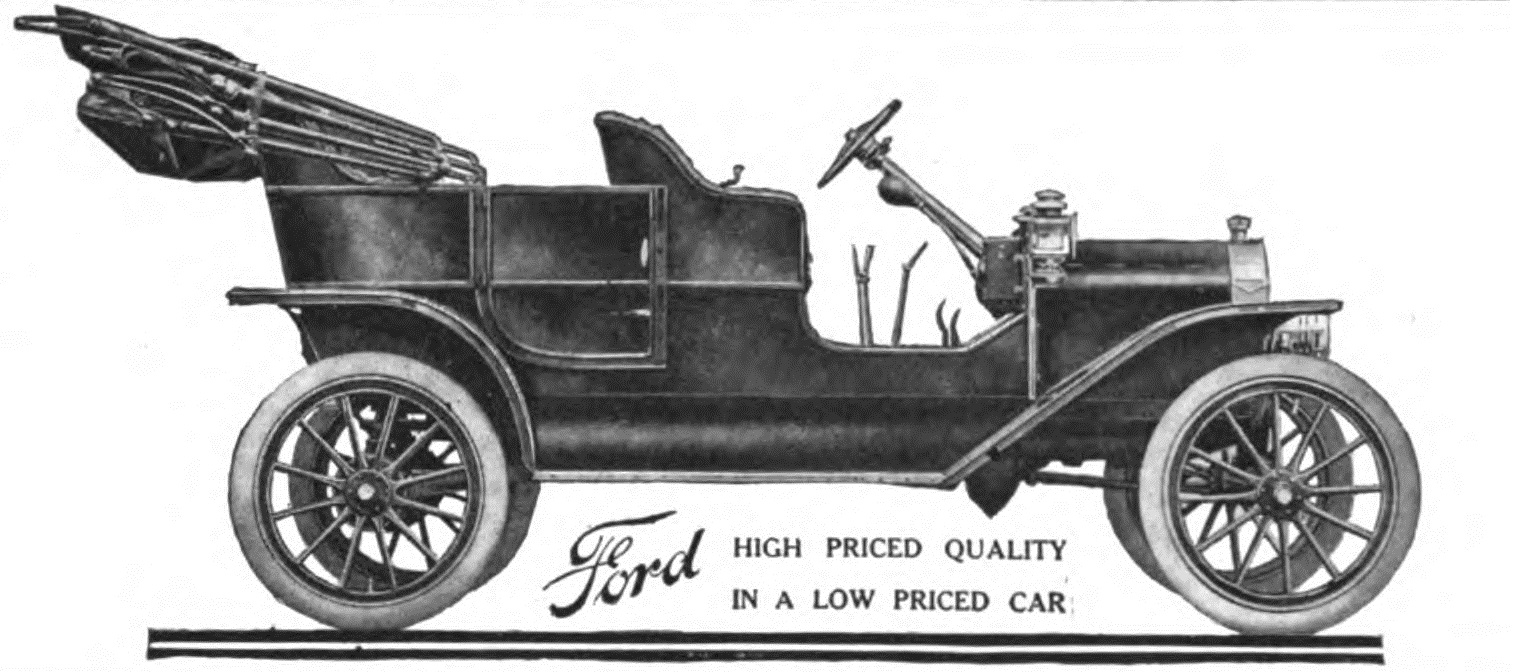
Ford Model T ad, c. 1908

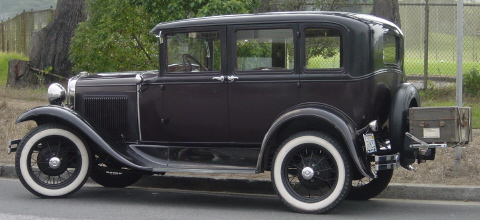
1930 Model A Fordor

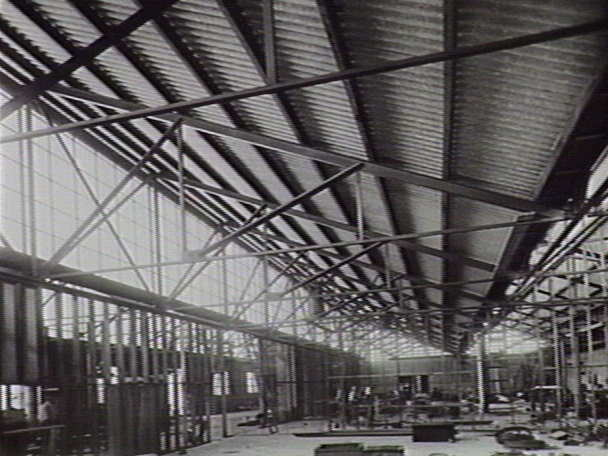
The Ford Australia plant under construction in Geelong, Victoria, Australia, 1926

- 1896: Henry Ford builds his first vehicle – the Quadricycle – on a buggy frame with 4 bicycle wheels.
- 1898: Ford creates the Detroit Automobile Company; two and a half years later it is dissolved.
- 1901: Ford wins high-profile car race in Grosse Pointe, Michigan. The Henry Ford Company is incorporated but discontinued the following year only to be reinvigorated by Henry Leland as the Cadillac Motor Company.
- 1903: Ford Motor Company incorporated with 11 original investors. The Model A "Fordmobile" is introduced – 1,708 cars are produced.
- 1904: Ford Motor Company of Canada incorporated in Walkerville, Ontario. Henry Ford teams up with Harvey Firestone of Firestone Tires.
- 1906: Ford becomes the top selling brand in the US, with 8,729 cars produced.
- 1908: Model T is introduced. 15 million are produced through 1927.
- 1909: Ford Motor Company (England) established, otherwise referred to as Ford of Britain
- 1911: Ford opens first factory outside North America – in Manchester, England.
- 1913: The moving assembly line is introduced at Highland Park assembly plant, making Model T production 8 times faster. Ford opens second world branch in Argentina as Ford Motor Argentina.
- 1914: Ford introduces $5 ($161, adjusted for inflation) wage for a workday – double the existing rate.
- 1916: Société française des automobiles Ford incorporated in Bordeaux, France, by Percival Perry, the head of Ford of Britain.
- 1918: Construction of the Rouge assembly complex begins.
- 1919: Edsel Ford succeeds Henry as Company President.
- 1920: Ford temporarily shuts down due to low sales. After removing unnecessary administrative expenses and waste, Ford reopens.
- 1921: Ford production exceeds 1 million cars per year, nearly 10 times more than Chevrolet – the next biggest selling brand.
- 1922: Ford purchases Lincoln Motor Company for US$8 million ($154 million, adjusted for inflation).
- 1925: Ford introduces Ford Tri-Motor airplane for airline services, and a factory was built in Yokohama, Japan in February.
- 1926: Ford Australia is founded in Geelong, Victoria, Australia,
- 1927: Model T production ends, Ford introduces the next generation Model A, from the Rouge complex.
- 1929: Ford regains production crown, with annual production peaking at 1.5 million cars
- 1931: Ford and Chevy brands begin to alternate as U.S. production leaders, in battle for automobile sales during the Great Depression.
- 1932: Ford introduces the one-piece cast V8 block. It makes the Model 18 the first low-priced V8-powered car. In London Royal Albert Hall the Model 19, or as it was marketed Model Y, are introduced February 19. The first of a long line of small European Fords.
- 1936: Lincoln-Zephyr is introduced.
- 1938: The German consul at Cleveland awards Henry Ford the Grand Cross of the German Eagle, the highest medal Nazi Germany could bestow on a foreigner.
- 1939: Mercury division is formed to fill the gap between economical Fords and luxury Lincolns. Operated as a division at Ford until 1945
- 1941: The Lincoln Continental is introduced. Ford begins building general-purpose "jeep" for the military. First labor agreement with UAW-CIO covers North American employees.
- 1942: Production of civilian vehicles halted, diverting factory capacity to producing B-24 Liberator bombers, tanks, and other products for the war effort.
- 1943: Edsel Ford dies of cancer at the age of 49; Henry Ford resumes presidency.
- 1945: Henry Ford II becomes president.
- 1945: Lincoln and Mercury are combined into a single division.
- 1946: Ford sues the Allies for damages done to factories in Dresden during the infamous bombing, and wins compensation.
- 1946: The Whiz Kids, former US Army Air Force officers, are hired to revitalize the company. Automobile production resumes.
- 1947: Henry Ford dies of cerebral hemorrhage at the age of 83; Henry Ford II becomes new chairman.
- 1948: F-1 Truck introduced. Lincoln Continental is introduced.
- 1949: The '49 Ford introduces all-new post-war era cars. The "Woody" station wagon is introduced.
- 1953 Ford Canada Headquarters and Car Plant opens in Oakville, Ontario
- 1953: The company celebrated its 50th anniversary by purchasing two hours of prime time on the CBS and NBC networks for The Ford 50th Anniversary Show that attracted an audience of 60 million.
- 1954: Thunderbird sports car introduced. The Thunderbird was marketed as a "personal car." Ford begins crash testing, and opens Arizona Proving Grounds.
- 1956: Ford World Headquarters dedicated, September 26, 1956
- 1956: $10,000 ($119,888, adjusted for inflation) Lincoln Continental Mark II introduced. Ford goes public with common stock shares. Ford's emphasis on safety with its Lifeguard option package, including seat belts and dash padding, earns the company Motor Trend's "Car of the Year" award.
- 1957: Ford launches the Edsel brand of automobiles in the fall of 1957 as 1958 models. Ford is top selling brand, with 1.68 million automobiles produced.
- 1957: Second generation Thunderbird introduced. The second generation Thunderbird was the first high volume "personal luxury car."
- 1959: Ford Credit Corporation formed to provide automotive financing.
- 1959: Ford withdraws the 1960 model Edsels from the market in November 1959.
- 1960: Ford Galaxie and compact Ford Falcon introduced.
- 1960: Robert McNamara is appointed president of Ford by Chairman Henry Ford II.
- 1960: Ford President Robert McNamara appointed Secretary of Defense by President elect John F. Kennedy.
- 1962: Ford of Britain launches first generation of the Ford Cortina. It would dominate the mid-size family segment in Europe for the next 20 years.

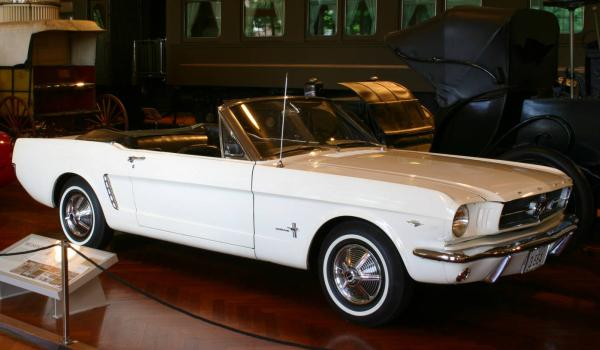
Mustang Serial #1, the first car launched in 1964

- 1964: Ford Mustang introduced. The Mustang was one of the cars that started the "pony car" class. Ford GT40 challenges Ferrari and Porsche at LeMans.
- 1965: Ford brand US sales exceed 2 million units. Ford of Germany and Ford of Britain jointly launch the first generation Ford Transit range of panel vans.
- 1965: Ford Galaxie 500 LTD debuts, advertised as quieter than a Rolls-Royce
- 1966: Ford Bronco sport utility vehicle introduced.
- 1966: After 2 previous attempts, Ford wins the famed 24 Hours of Le Mans car race in France with their GT40 Mk.II.
- 1967: Ford of Europe is established by merging the operations of Ford of Britain and Ford of Germany.
- 1967: Ford opens Talbotville car plant in St. Thomas, Ontario
- 1968: Lincoln Mark Series is introduced as the company's first personal luxury car to compete with the Cadillac Eldorado. Ford of Europe launches first generation Ford Escort.
- 1970: Ford Maverick are introduced. Ford establishes Asia Pacific operations. Ford of Europe launches the third generation Cortina/Taunus – merging the two previously independent product lines under a common platform. Saarlouis assembly plant in Germany opens.
- 1972: Retractable seat belts introduced. "Project Bobcat" – Ford's largest single vehicle project to date, is initiated to develop the company's first front-wheel drive compact hatchback model. Will emerge as the Fiesta in 1976.
- 1973: Ford US brand sales reaches an all-time high of 2.35 million vehicles produced.
- 1974: Ford Mustang II debuts as a smaller, more economical pony car. Ford of Europe launches second generation Capri – is again sold under the Mercury brand in North American markets.
- 1975: Ford Granada and Mercury Monarch introduced, Production of the Maverick dropped in 1975 with the release of the Granada as a more European-style luxury compact. Ford of Europe launches the second generation Escort.
- 1976: Ford of Europe launches formally launches the first generation Ford Fiesta, and later that year the fourth generation Cortina/Taunus. Opening of the Valencia assembly plant in Spain.
- 1977: Ford of Europe launches the second-generation Granada.
- 1978: Ford Motor Company celebrates 75th anniversary. Continental Mark V and Thunderbird available with "Diamond Jubilee Edition" packages. Fiesta is imported from Europe as an entry into the economy segment.
- 1979: Ford acquires 25% stake in Mazda. Ford becomes the final American automaker to introduce downsized full-size cars with radically smaller Panther platform.
- 1979: Begins corporate underwriting of the television show Washington Week in Review for PBS, that lasted 20 years.
- 1980: Ford of Europe launches the third generation Escort, it is voted European Car of the Year for 1981.
- 1981: The Lincoln Town Car and Ford Escort are introduced. Fiesta discontinued in North America.
- 1982: Ford of Europe introduce the Ford Sierra, ending production of the stalwart Cortina/Taunus after 20 years and four generations.
- 1983: Ford launches a redesigned "aero design" Thunderbird. In a model shift, the Granada is discontinued in North America, replaced by a facelifted model re-branded as the LTD. All full-size models are now LTD Crown Victorias/Country Squires.
- 1984: Ford Tempo and Mercury Topaz are introduced, replacing the Ford Fairmont/Mercury Zephyr.

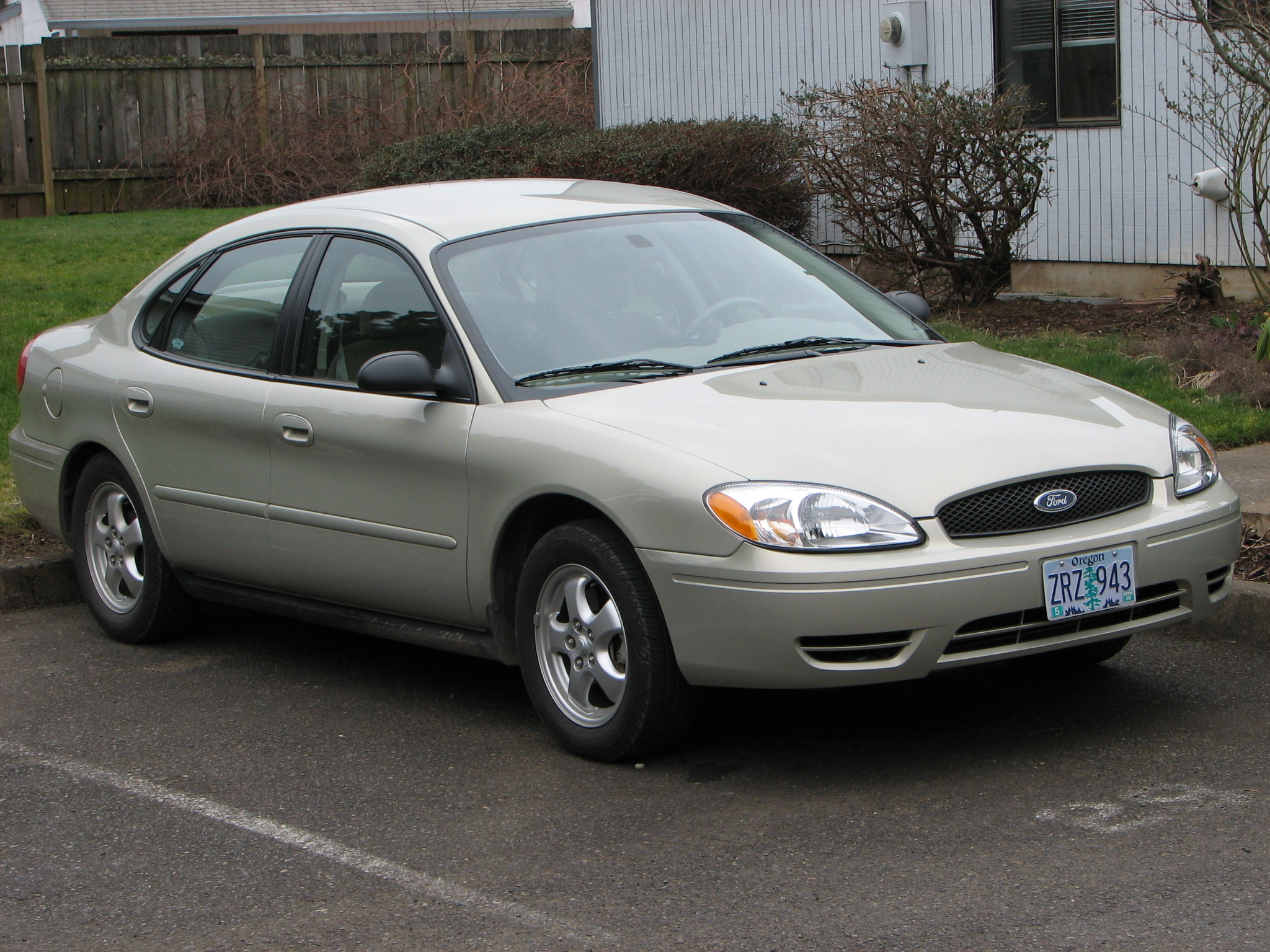
Ford Taurus, introduced in 1985

- 1985: Ford Scorpio launched by Ford of Europe. Replaces Granada as its full-size offering and is voted European Car of the Year for 1986, Ford's second COTY win in the 1980s. Merkur brand launched to market the Sierra and Scorpio models in North America. Purchases First Nationwide Financial Corporation, a savings and loan, for $493 million in cash. Ford Taurus introduced with dramatic "aero design" styling, along with Ford Aerostar minivan. Taurus is one of Ford's best-selling models, with 7,000,000 units sold ranks among the 4th best-selling car in Ford's history, behind only the F-150, Model T and Mustang.
- 1986: Ford of Europe launches the second generation of the Transit van family. Ford Capri ceases production.
- 1987: Ford acquires Aston Martin Lagonda and Hertz Rent-a-Car. Henry Ford II dies at age 70.
- 1988: Ford Festiva, built in Korea by Kia is introduced.
- 1989: Ford acquires Jaguar. Mazda MX-5 Miata is unveiled. Third generation Fiesta is launched in Europe – and establishes itself as the fastest selling generation of Fiesta to date – 1 million units in less than two years. Acquires Associates First Capital Corporation (a finance company) from Gulf and Western Industries. In 1998, it is spun off to Ford shareholders.
- 1990: Ford Aerostar is Motor Trend's Truck Of The Year, while Lincoln Town Car is Motor Trend's Car Of The Year. Merkur brand of automobiles production discontinued. Ford of Europe launches fourth generation Escort.
- 1991: Ford Explorer is introduced, turning the traditionally rural and recreational SUV into a popular family vehicle.
- 1992: Ford Aerostar and Ford Taurus/Mercury Sable are redesigned; Ford Taurus becomes America's top selling car, displacing the Honda Accord. Ford of Europe announces first generation Ford Mondeo, the first product of the global CDW27 platform.
- 1992: Redesigned Ford Crown Victoria and Mercury Grand Marquis launched, the first new full-size sedans in 13 years; Ford Country Squire/Mercury Colony Park station wagon discontinued.
- 1993: Ford launches Mondeo in Europe, and announces its North American derivatives – the Ford Contour and Mercury Mystique.
- 1994: Ford Tempo and Mercury Topaz are discontinued – replaced by Ford Contour and Mercury Mystique.
- 1994: Ford Aspire replaces Festiva, becoming the first car in its class to offer standard dual air bags and optional 4-wheel ABS. After large losses, First Nationwide was sold for $1.1 billion to First Madison Bank, which merged while keeping the First Nationwide name.
- 1995: Ford's first front-wheel-drive V8 sedan is introduced, the 4.6L V8-powered Lincoln Continental. Ford of Europe launches fourth-generation Fiesta. New front-wheel-drive Ford Windstar minivan is introduced. Aerostar remains in production. Redesigned Ford Explorer released, now with standard safety features such as dual air bags, 4-wheel ABS as standard equipment.
- 1996: Ford certifies all plants in 26 countries to ISO 9000 quality and ISO 14001 environmental standards. The V12-powered Jaguar XJS is discontinued. Controversially redesigned "Ovoid" Ford Taurus and Mercury Sable are introduced. Discontinuation of Chevrolet Caprice leaves full size fleet market to Ford Crown Victoria. Ford increases investment stake in a troubled Mazda Corporation to a controlling interest of 33.4%.
- 1997: Full size 4-door SUV Ford Expedition introduced to replace the Ford Bronco. Mercury Mountaineer introduced. Redesigned Ford Escort and Mercury Tracer also introduced. Ford Aerostar production ends, along with Ford Probe, Ford Thunderbird, Mercury Cougar, Mazda MX-6, and Ford Aspire, without immediate replacement. Sculpted redesign of Ford's top-selling F-150 pickup, overcomes controversy to set sales records.
- 1998: Lincoln Navigator introduced. Mark VIII is in its final year, introduces HID-headlamps, midway through model year 1996.
- 1998: The Focus replaces the aging Escort in Europe and quickly becomes one of the best-selling cars of the segment. Is launched in North America for the 2000 model year.
- 1999: Ford acquires Volvo car division from Volvo. Bill Ford becomes chairman of the board, replacing Jacques Nasser. A smaller sporty Mercury Cougar is reintroduced with front-wheel drive. Jaguar Racing Formula One team is formed, with Jackie Stewart at the helm. Ford splits its full-sized pick-ups into two distinct models (the first to do so) with the introduction of the Ford F-Series Super Duty (F-250 – F-550). Ford Excursion (based on Super Duty) is introduced, and has the distinction of being the largest SUV sold anywhere.
- 2000: Ford purchases Land Rover brand from BMW. Lincoln LS and Jaguar S-Type are introduced, along with a refreshed Ford Taurus and Mercury Sable. The Lincoln LS becomes the 2000 Motor Trend Car of the Year. Escort is discontinued in Europe. Third generation Transit platform is launched in Europe.
- 2001: Retro-styled Ford Thunderbird is introduced, based on the Lincoln LS/Jaguar S-Type DEW98 platform, and is also named Motor Trend Car of the Year for 2002.
- 2002: Fifth-generation Fiesta is launched by Ford of Europe.
- 2002: Lincoln Continental is discontinued after a roughly fifty-year run. Jaguar X-Type is introduced (first AWD Jaguar). Escort van production ends in Europe, marking the end of the Escort name after a 24-year production run. Ford Transit Connect production begins at Ford-Otosan in Turkey.
- 2003: Ford Motor Company's 100th Anniversary. The Ford GT is released, along with limited Centennial editions of some Ford vehicles.
- 2004: Jaguar Racing team sold to Red Bull GmbH. Ranger sales decline, losing the title as top-selling compact pickup. The Ford Escape Hybrid, the first gasoline-electric hybrid SUV, is introduced. Major redesign of the Ford F-150 and introduction of the Lincoln Mark LT. Ford Freestar and Mercury Monterey minivans are introduced, replacing the Ford Windstar and Mercury Villager.
- 2005: Ford Mustang redesigned with retro styling reminiscent of the 1960s models. The Ford Five Hundred, Mercury Montego, and Ford Freestyle are introduced. Mercury Sable production ends, and Ford Taurus production is limited to rental car, taxi, and other fleet sales.
- 2006: Ford Taurus ends production after a 20-year run. Ford Fusion, Mercury Milan, and Lincoln Zephyr introduced. Ford announces major restructuring program The Way Forward, which includes plans to shut unprofitable factories. Bill Ford steps down as CEO, remains as executive chairman. Alan Mulally elected president and CEO. Ford Freestar and Mercury Monterey minivans are discontinued without replacement. Ford mortgages all assets to raise $23.4 billion cash in secured credit lines, in order to finance product development during restructuring through 2009. According to J. D. Power and Associates quality surveys, the Ford Fusion is rated higher in quality than its chief rivals, the Toyota Camry and Honda Accord.
- 2007: Ford sells Aston Martin to a British consortium led by Prodrive chairman David Richards, and announces plans to sell Jaguar and Land Rover. Ford reports losses of $12.7 billion for 2006. Ford Edge and Lincoln MKX introduced. The Lincoln Zephyr is replaced with the Lincoln MKZ. A redesigned Ford Expedition (including the longer wheelbase "EL" version) and Lincoln Navigator are introduced. Ford unveils the Ford Interceptor and Lincoln MKR concept cars, and a pre-production Lincoln MKS is introduced. The Ford Five Hundred, Ford Freestyle and Mercury Montego nameplates are dropped and replaced with the previously retired Ford Taurus, Ford Taurus X, and Mercury Sable nameplates.
- 2008: Ford sells Jaguar and Land Rover to Tata Motors.
- 2008: Ford of Europe launches sixth-generation Fiesta, based on the Verve concept car.
- 2009 Ford announces that it will leverage more of its European line-up for the North American market. The Turkish-built Transit Connect compact panel van is the first exponent of this strategy, followed by the sixth-generation Ford Fiesta subcompact.
- 2010 Ford sells Volvo Cars to Geely Automobile. Third-generation Ford Focus unveiled – as with the first generation car, it will return to using a single platform for all markets – will be released in North America as a 2012 model.
- 2011: Mercury production ends; the last vehicle is a Grand Marquis. Lincoln Town Car is discontinued. Ford Focus Electric unveiled. Ford announces that they will sell 8 million vehicles globally by 2015.
- 2011: Ford Ranger discontinued for North America; redesigned global version launched.
- 2012: Fourth generation Mondeo/Fusion previewed at the Detroit Motor Show, thus reuniting Ford's mid-size platform for Europe and North America for the first time since the CDW27 1st gen Mondeo/Contour/Mystique of 1994. Ford Crown Victoria, sold only for export in 2012, is discontinued.
- 2013: Fourth generation Transit/Tourneo launched, along with the second generation Transit Connect and the refreshed Fiesta is revealed.
- 2014: The Ford Mustang celebrates 50 years of production with the launch of its sixth generation. The 2015 F-150 is launched, featuring an aluminum-intensive body design.
- 2017: Ford of Europe launches seventh-generation Fiesta.
- 2018: The 10 millionth Ford Mustang (the top-ranking sports car in America) "gallops off the assembly line." Ford of Europe launches fourth-generation Focus. Ford announces that it will discontinue all non-SUV and pick-up products in North American markets with the exception of the Mustang.
- 2020: Ford begins selling the Ford Mustang Mach-E, which begins the shift towards electric vehicle production.
- 2021: Ford brings back the Ford Bronco after a roughly 25 year pause in production.

Sources:

- General Timeline (through 2002): "2002 Annual Report". Ford Motor Company. Archived from the original on February 17, 2007.

== List of Chief Executive officers ==
- John S. Gray (1903–1906)
- Henry Ford (1906–1945)
- Henry Ford II (1945–1979)
- Philip Caldwell (1979–1985)
- Donald Petersen (1985–1990)
- Harold Arthur Poling (1990–1993)
- Alexander Trotman (1993–1999)
- Jacques Nasser (1999–2001)
- William Clay Ford Jr. (2001–2006)
- Alan Mulally (2006–2014)
- Mark Fields (2014–2017)
- Jim Hackett (2017–2020)
- Jim Farley (2020–present)

== Criticism and controversies ==
Throughout its history, the company has faced a wide range of criticisms. Some have accused the early Fordist model of production of being exploitative, and Ford has been criticized as being willing to collaborate with dictatorships or hire mobs to intimidate union leaders and increase their profits through unethical means.

Ford refused to allow collective bargaining until 1941, with the Ford Service Department being set up as an internal security, intimidation, and espionage unit within the company, and quickly gained a reputation of using violence against union organizers and sympathizers.

Ford was also criticized for tread separation and tire disintegration of many Firestone tires installed on Ford Explorers, Mercury Mountaineers, and Mazda Navajos, which caused many crashes during the late 1990s and early 2000s (decade). It is estimated that over 250 deaths and more than 3,000 serious injuries resulted from these failures. Although Firestone received most of the blame, some blame fell on Ford, which advised customers to under-inflate the tires in order to reduce the risk of vehicle rollovers.

=== Nazi collaboration ===
In 1940, at a time when the German division had begun to use slave labor, Ford-Werke was still under the ownership of Dearborn. After Pearl Harbor, Ford lost control of its division in Germany, and all the Ford facilities in Germany came under the full control of the Nazi government. In 1943, the company wrote off all its holdings in Germany as a total loss and never reclaimed them after the war. The German Ford company used slave labor in Cologne between 1940 and 1945 and produced military vehicles such as trucks, planes, and ships. Many of these allegations were made in a series of United States lawsuits in 1998. The lawsuit was dismissed in 1999 because the judge concluded "the issues ... concerned international treaties between nations and foreign policy and were thus in the realm of the executive branch."

On June 26, 1940, one day after the Fall of France, Ford president Edsel Ford was present at a celebratory dinner at the Manhattan Waldorf Astoria organized by Gerhard Alois Westrick. Other attendees included Sosthenes Behn of ITT, Torkild Rieber of Texaco, James D. Mooney of General Motors, and Philip Dakin Wagoner of the Underwood Typewriter Company.

Defenders of the company argue that the German Ford division, Fordwerke, had been taken over by the Nazi government after it rose to power, claiming that it was not under the company's control. Although Ford's initial motivations were anti-war, the plants in Allied countries were heavily involved in the Allied war effort after the outbreak of war.

=== Argentine "Dirty War" ===
Ford's Argentine subsidiary was accused of allegedly collaborating with the Argentine 1976–1983 military dictatorship, actively helping in the political repression of intellectuals and dissidents that was pursued by said government. The company has denied the allegations.

In a lawsuit initiated in 1996 by relatives of some of the estimated 600 Spanish citizens who disappeared in Argentina during the "Dirty War", evidence was presented to support the allegation that much of this repression was directed by Ford and the other major industrial firms. According to a 5,000-page report, Ford executives drew up lists of "subversive" workers and handed them over to the military task-forces which were allowed to operate within the factories. These groups allegedly kidnapped, tortured and murdered workers—at times within the plants themselves.

In a second trial, a report brought by the CTA, and the testimonies of former Ford workers themselves, claimed that the company's Argentine factory was used between 1976 and 1978 as a detention center, and that management allowed the military to set up its own bunker inside the plant.

=== Climate change denial ===
Similarly to General Motors and oil companies ExxonMobil, Shell and TotalEnergies, Ford has been accused of funding climate change denial despite allegedly knowing about the effects of climate change since the 1960s.

In 1956, Canadian physicist Gilbert Norman Plass joined the Aeronutronic division of Ford, based in Newport Beach, California, which focused on aerospace and defense issues. Before arriving at Ford, Plass had published a series of pieces on the climate, including a 1956 article in the magazine American Scientist titled "Carbon Dioxide and Climate Change" and a 1956 paper in the journal Tellus titled "The Carbon Dioxide Theory of Climate Change." Both pieces made the claim that humanity was responsible for heating the Earth since the 1900s by burning fossil fuels and pumping massive quantities of CO_{2} into the atmosphere. He continued to study CO_{2} at Ford, using the company's computers to run early climate models and published his findings in peer-reviewed scientific journals. In 1960, Plass became manager of the research lab in the theoretical physics department of Ford.

After the Aeronutronic division of Ford was merged with Philco and rebranded as Philco-Ford, a researcher at the new company named Darrell Eugene Burch continued to examine the issue, co-authoring a series of 1967 scientific reports on CO_{2} absorption in the atmosphere. It's unclear whether Burch or Plass shared their findings with top executives at Ford.

In 1989, Ford joined the Global Climate Coalition, which opposed efforts to reduce greenhouse emissions during the George H. W. Bush administration. It became the first American company to withdraw from the lobbying group in 1999. Ford also made donations to think tanks that disputed the scientific consensus on climate change between 1985 and 1997.

=== Ford Pinto ===
In September 1971, the Ford Motor Company launched the subcompact Pinto for the North American market. The car's fuel tank integrity is alleged to have been substandard for the time, making the car inordinately susceptible to fuel tank ruptures in rear impact collisions. An article published in Mother Jones contributed to a public controversy by saying that Ford knowingly released a design that would result in hundreds of deaths as well as calculating that it was cheaper to fight injury claims in court than make changes to the Pinto's fuel system. Public outcry related to the controversy and the Mother Jones article created political pressure on the National Highway Traffic Safety Administration which initialed an investigation. The result of the investigation was the issuing a determination that the Pinto and related Mercury Bobcat were defective. This resulted in Ford recalling 1.5 million Pintos and Bobcats, the largest automotive recall to date. Two notable legal cases, Grimshaw v. Ford Motor Company and State of Indiana v. Ford Motor Company, are the result of accident related fuel system fires. The Grimshaw jury awarded the plaintiffs $127 million, the largest product liability and negligence award in history at that time; the trial judge reduced the jury award to $3.5 million. Indiana v. Ford was the first time a corporation indicted on criminal charges for a defective product, the Ford Pinto, and the first corporation charged with reckless homicide. The case resulted in a not guilty verdict. Subsequent research has discredited early fatality figures and indicate the Pinto's overall fire safety record was typical for subcompacts of the time.

=== Apartheid ===
In 2002, Ford (along with other multinational corporations) was sued by a group of South Africans represented by the Khulumani Support Group. The plaintiffs alleged that the company provided vehicles to the South African security forces during the Apartheid. The lawsuit was dismissed in 2014 because the company could not be held liable for the actions of its South African subsidiary.
