= Ford 999 =

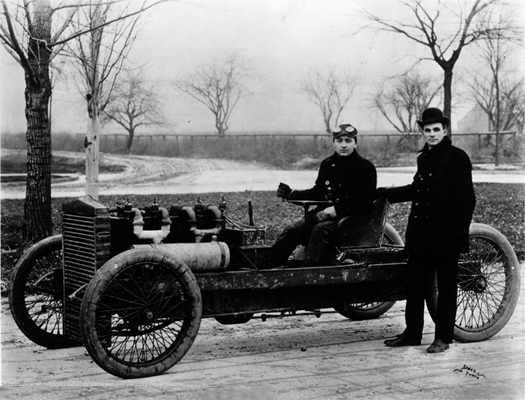

Overview
- Production: 2
- Assembly: Detroit, Michigan
- Designer: Henry Ford

Body and chassis
- Layout: Front-engine, rear-wheel-drive

Powertrain
- Engine: 1155.9 in^{3} (18.9 L) I4

The Ford 999 was a nameplate attached to two distinct but similar racers built by Henry Ford during the early 20th century. Though they began as separate entities, they were virtually mechanically identical, and parts (and ultimately names) were swapped between them as needed, making the cars' histories inseparable.

== Origin ==
Henry Ford had an early interest in racing cars, having built and driven "Sweepstakes", a 26 horsepower (19 kW) model that won a race against Alexander Winton and other challengers in 1901. It was from the proceeds of this race that Ford created the Henry Ford Company. In March 1902, Ford left this original company over disputes with his stockholders and Henry Leland, taking with him $900 and schematics for a planned racer. In Ford's absence, Leland took over the company, and made it into the Cadillac Motor Company later in 1902.

Henry Ford collaborated with bicycle racer Tom Cooper and a team of several assistants to create two similar racing cars that were as yet unnamed. They were painted red and yellow, respectively. The result was a huge engine with a bare chassis attached to it, with no bodywork whatsoever. Both of the cars were extremely heavily engineered, with an 1156 cu.in.(18.9 L) inline-four engine, 230 lb (100 kg) flywheel, a bore of 7.25 inches (184 mm) and a stroke of 7.0 inches (180 mm). Power was quoted anywhere from 70 to 100 horsepower (75 kW). There was no rear suspension, no differential, and steering was by pivoting a straight metal bar with upright handgrips at the ends. The total cost of the project was $5000.

Though Ford's name was attached to the cars and the ensuing legend, he had sold his stake in them for $800 to Barney Oldfield and Cooper when the cars had refused to start during a test drive two weeks before the first race. Ultimately, Ford abandoned his share of the racing money, but reserved the right to publicize and promote the cars, which secured his image behind their eventual successes. He meanwhile built up the Ford Motor Company, which surpassed Winton in terms of production by the end of 1903.

In summer of 1902, Cooper and Oldfield carried out further work and got the red car working. It was named 999 for the Empire State Express No. 999, for a type 4-4-0 American steam locomotive which had reached a claimed 112.5 mph (181.1 km/h) on May 10, 1893, making it the first man-made vehicle to exceed 100 mph (160 km/h) under its own propulsion. The yellow car was named Arrow, to speed like one.

== Racing career ==
Oldfield, despite having absolutely no driving experience, learned how to race the 999. In his October 1902 debut, a five-mile (8 km) race known as the Manufacturers' Challenge Cup, despite a strong challenge from Alexander Winton once again (which was the rematch for which Ford had originally planned), Oldfield easily won. The 999 set a course speed record at the track at Grosse Pointe, and went on to tour America and score many other victories. Cooper retained ownership of the car for its racing career, while Oldfield ultimately pursued a racing career with Winton, against whom he had raced at the outset.

== Ice speed record ==
The yellow "999" named Arrow also had a successful racing career, in which it would earn that designation. It crashed in September 1903 during a race, killing the driver, Frank Day. However, Henry Ford bought the car back and repaired it with the intent of performing a speed run on a frozen lake. He renamed it 999, as the original red car had been retired already, and the press referred to it as the "new 999," "Red Devil," or a combination of the two.

On January 12, 1904, in New Baltimore, Michigan, Henry Ford personally drove the rechristened 999 with his mechanic Ed "Spider" Huff at the throttle. A new speed record on ice was achieved of 91.37 mph (147.05 km/h) on a track carved into Lake St. Clair's Anchor Bay. The mark only stood for only a few weeks, but that was sufficient to bring more good publicity for Ford's new company.

== See also ==
- Land speed record
