= Association of Licensed Automobile Manufacturers =

American organization

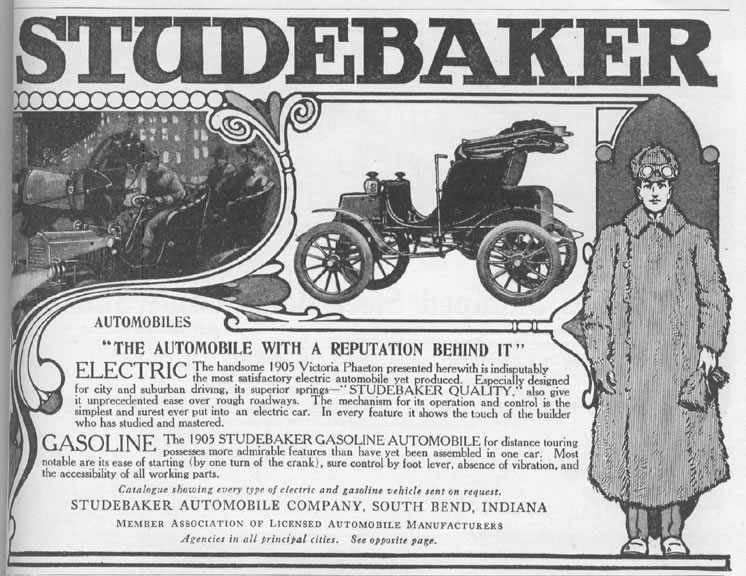
1905 Studebaker advertisement claiming (at the bottom) Association of Licensed Automobile Manufacturers membership

The Association of Licensed Automobile Manufacturers (ALAM), began as the Manufacturer's Mutual Association (MMA), an organization originally formed to challenge the litigation of the fledgling automobile industry by George B. Selden and the Electric Vehicle Company. Ultimately, the organization took advantage of its power and became Selden's greatest ally. In exchange for favorable royalty rates, the group gained the power to litigate and exclude other manufacturers from licensing, making them the most powerful group in the early automotive industry.

== Early history ==
In 1899, the Electric Vehicle Company purchased the rights to Selden's automobile patent. The patent was deemed flimsy by most of the industry, but the company purchased the rights to guarantee the legality of their new venture, the Columbia Automobile Company. A year later, however, the Columbia Automobile Company was in shambles thanks to internal corruption and low demand for electric vehicles, and the Electric Vehicle Company turned to the Selden patent as an alternative source of revenue. They set out to have manufacturers pay a 5% royalty on all cars produced.

By 1900, The Electric Vehicle Company launched several lawsuits against automobile manufacturers. Their ultimate target among the fray was Alexander Winton, and his Winton Motor Carriage Company. Originally formed in 1896, the Winton Company was by 1900 the highest-volume automobile producer in the US. If the patent were to gain validity in the industry, Selden believed, they needed to tackle the largest manufacturer.

The Winton Company's defense made the costly mistake of concentrating on challenging the patent’s validity through demurrer; by 1902 the case was still tied up and Winton was considering a settlement. In response to his distress, other independent automobile makers formed a group called the Manufacturers Mutual Association to breathe new life into Winton's legal defense. Formed by Henry Bourne Joy of Packard and Frederic L. Smith of Olds, the two entrepreneurs used their position to threaten the Electric Vehicle Company. The MMA called for much lower royalty payments and for the legal and license rights to be controlled by the MMA, or else they would bolster Winton's dying legal fund.

== Control of the industry ==
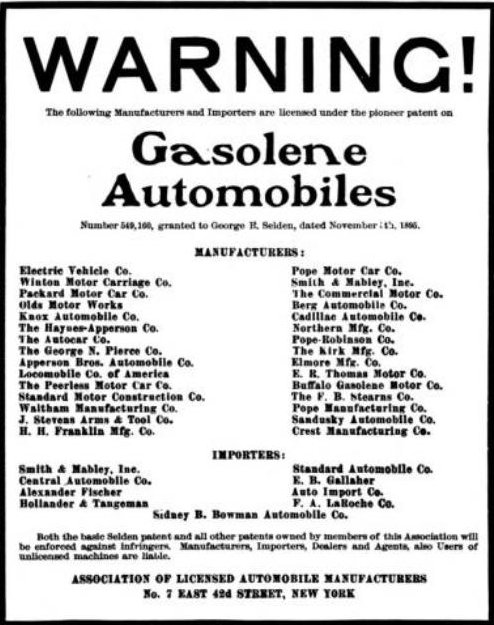
1904 ALAM Advertisement

By 1903, the organization had officially become the Association of Licensed Automobile Manufacturers, and had secured favorable rights from the Electric Vehicle Company. Only a few months after the formation of the organization, Winton became an ALAM member, and the suit against his company was dropped. The patent had gained legitimacy without ever having its validity determined.

The ALAM gained from the agreement, giving them control over the entire automobile industry for a relatively low cost. The group negotiated a 1.25% royalty on all cars produced, one-half of one percent of which went directly into the ALAM legal and operations funds. Applications for ALAM membership and a Selden license were granted only by the unanimous decision of a five-member executive board. This system left ALAM members with royalties considerably lower than the costs of trying the Selden patent in the courts, and gave existing members the ability to exclude and even litigate unlicensed competitors.

The ALAM's exclusionary policies were ultimately its undoing. The up-and-coming Ford Motor Company was capitalized in 1903, and Henry Ford immediately attempted to secure a Selden license. He was denied, officially due to his past business failures (the Detroit Automobile Company and the Henry Ford Company, specifically), and also due to the protectionist climate of the ALAM. Frederic Smith of Olds was the executive board member most outspoken against Ford’s admission to the ALAM, and also had the most to lose from such an admission, as he held most of the Detroit market for mass-produced automobiles.

On October 22, 1903, the ALAM filed suit with the Ford Motor Company, and what followed was a messy public relations battle. The ALAM launched a campaign threatening to sue those who purchased Ford automobiles. Ford responded in-kind, summing up their position as, "We believe that the art would have been just as far advanced to-day if Mr. Selden had never been born."

On September 15, 1909, presiding judge Charles Merrill Hough found legitimacy in the Selden patent. The court of appeals later overturned the ruling, finding in favor of Ford on January 9, 1911. ALAM chose not to contest the ruling.

== See also ==
- The Wright brothers patent war, another vehicular technology patent lawsuit of the same time period
- Intellectual property
- Patent troll
- Cartel
- SCO–Linux disputes

== Sources ==
- The New York Times, (NYT) "Motor Vehicle Patent Case", November 12, 1900
  - "Motor Car Patents Upheld by Court", September 16, 1909
  - "Did Not Infringe on Selden Engine", January 10, 1911
  - "Won't Contest Decision", January 13, 1911
- Greenleaf, William. Monopoly on Wheels: Henry Ford and the Selden Automobile Patent, Wayne State University Press, 1961; ISBN 0-7581-0626-2
- Lacey, Robert. Ford: the Men and the Machine, Little Brown and Co; ISBN 0-7581-0626-2
