= Ford Quadricycle =

First automobile developed by American industrialist Henry Ford (1896)

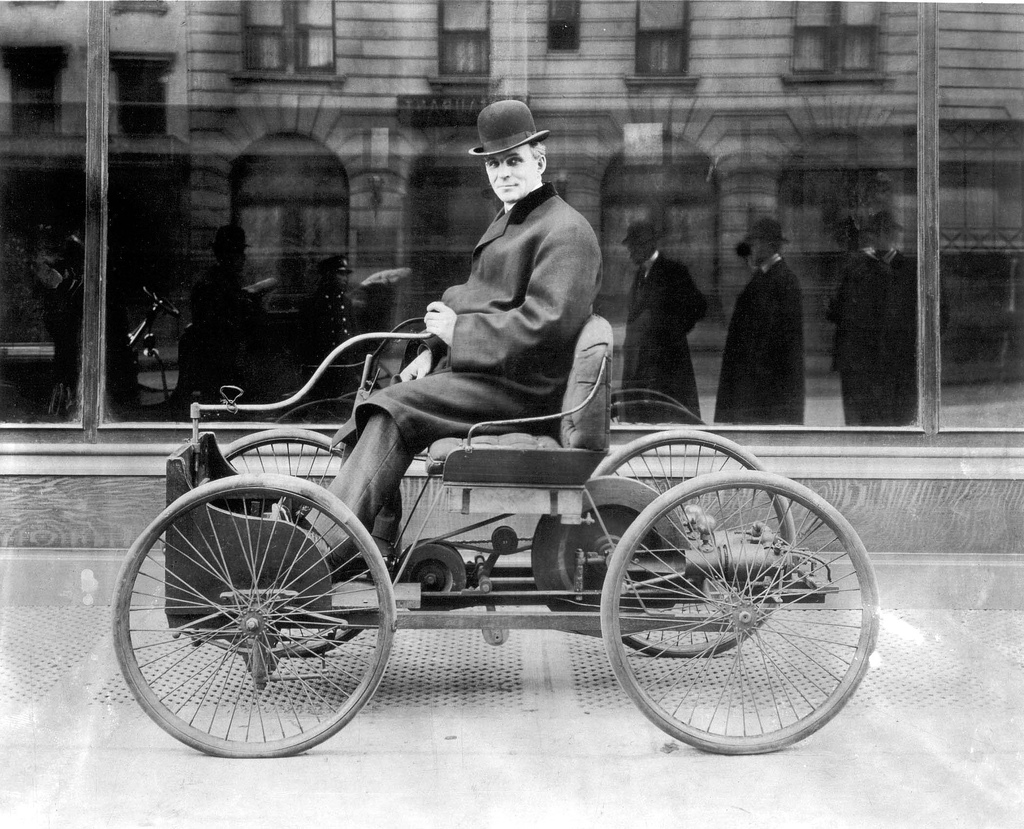

Overview
- Manufacturer: Henry Ford Company
- Also called: The horseless carriage
- Production: 1896–1901 Ford sold his first Quadricycle for $200 in 1896 to Charles Ainsley. He later built two more Quadricycles: one in 1899, and another in 1901. He eventually bought his first one back for $60. (according to Ford Museum records)
- Designer: Henry Ford

Body and chassis
- Body style: 2-seat roadster

Powertrain
- Engine: 2-cylinder
- Transmission: 2-speed (no reverse)

Dimensions
- Wheelbase: 49 in (1,200 mm)
- Curb weight: 500 lb (230 kg)

Chronology
- Successor: Ford Model A (1903–04)

The Ford Quadricycle was the first vehicle developed by Henry Ford. Ford's first car was a simple frame with a gas-powered engine mounted onto four bicycle wheels.

== Historic Frame ==
The earliest cars were hand built, one by one, and were very expensive. The machines were seen as toys for the rich. In the 1890s, the "horseless carriage" was a relatively new idea, with no one having a fixed, universal idea of what a car should look like or how it should work. Most of the first car builders were inventors, rather than businessmen, working with their imaginations and the parts they had on hand. Thus, the invention of the Quadricycle type of vehicle in France in the 1880s marks an important innovation as a proto-automobile that would lay the foundation for the future, with more practical designs to follow.

The term "Quadricycle" comes from the fact that these vehicles ran on four tires, and that it used a lot of the bicycle technology of the time - the spoked wheels and tires, and the drivetrain to power the rear wheels.

== Ford's first Automobile ==
On June 4, 1896, in a tiny workshop behind his home on 58 Bagley Avenue, Detroit, where the Michigan Building now stands, Ford put the finishing touches on his pure ethanol-powered motor. After more than two years of experimentation, Ford, at the age of 32, had completed his first experimental automobile. The success of the little vehicle led to the founding of the Detroit Automobile Company in 1899, followed by the Henry Ford Company in 1901 and then later the Ford Motor Company in 1903.

The two cylinder engine could produce 4 horsepower. The Quadricycle was driven by a chain. The transmission had only two gears (first for up to 10 mph (16 km/h), 2nd for up to 20 mph (32 km/h)), but did not have a reverse gear. The machine was steered using a tiller, had wire wheels and a 3 US gal (11 L) fuel tank under the seat. Ford test drove it on June 4, 1896, after various test drives, achieving a top speed of 20 mph (32 km/h). Ford would later go on to found the Ford Motor Company and become one of the world's richest men.

The original Quadricycle resides at The Henry Ford Museum in Dearborn, Michigan.

== Replicas ==
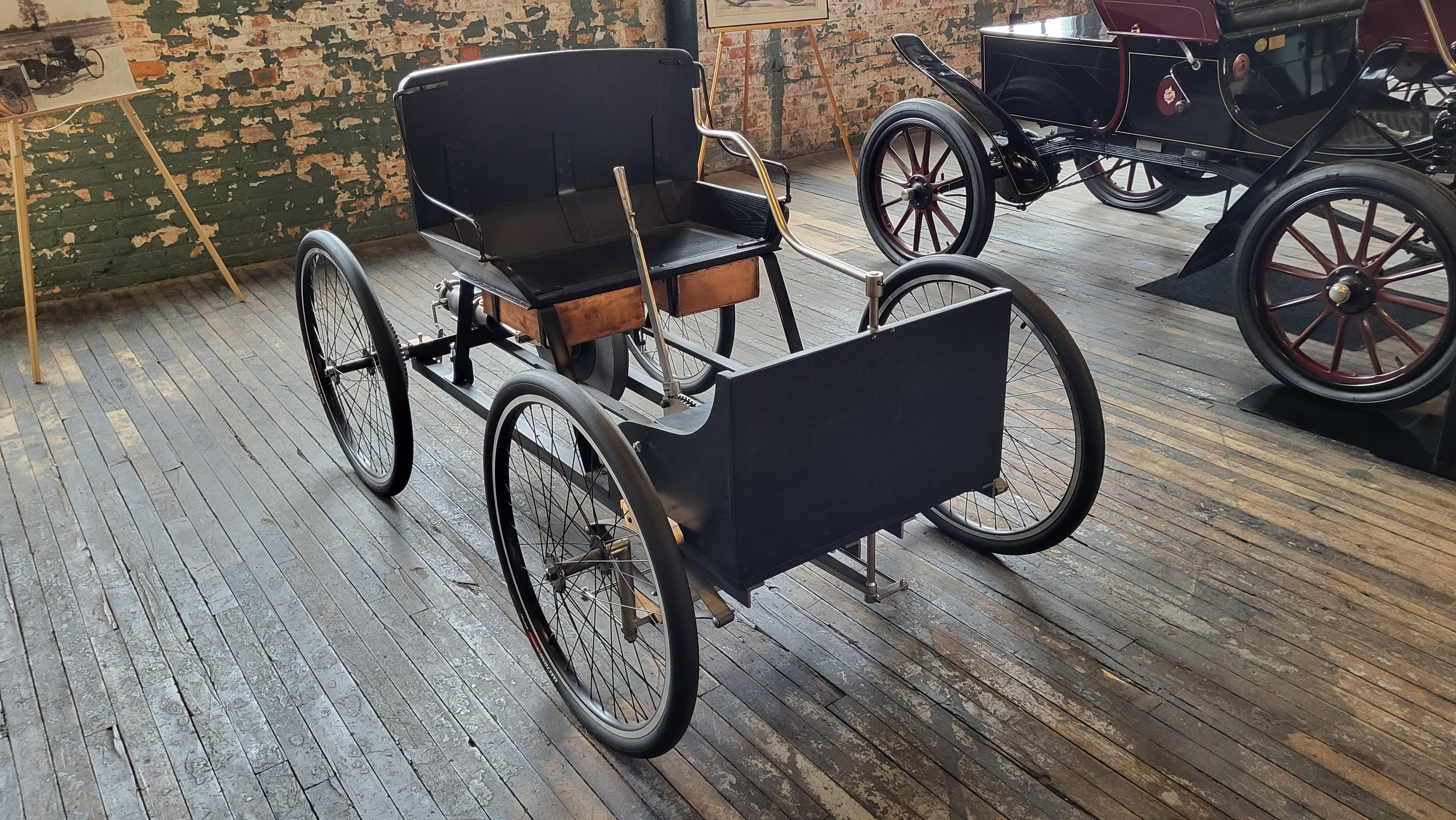
Ford Quadricycle replica in the Ford Piquette Avenue Plant in Detroit, Michigan

Several Ford Quadricycle replicas exist. Enthusiast Burnard Jarstfer built a replica, to resemble the original as close as he was able to, without actually having access to it.

== See also ==
- Quadricycle
