= Ford Company =

Ford Company may refer to:

- Ford Motor Company, founded in 1903 by Henry Ford
- Henry Ford Company, founded in 1901 by Henry Ford
