= Frederic L. Smith =

American automotive businessman (1870–1954)

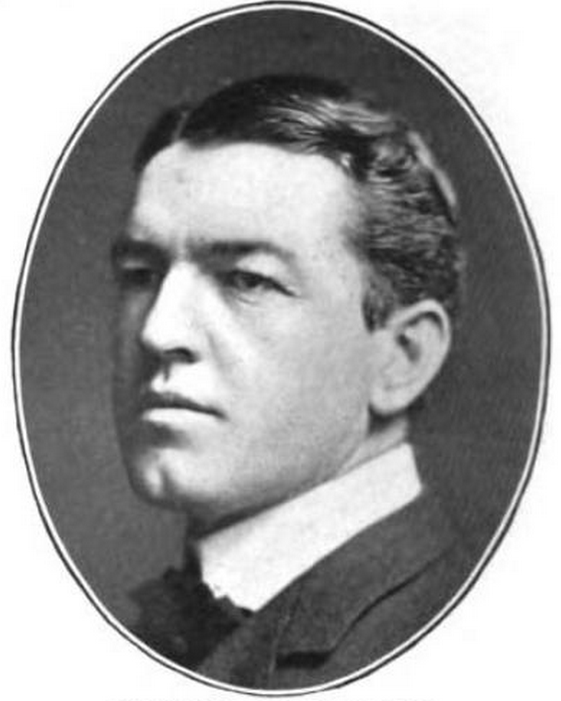
- Smith, c. 1904
- Born: Frederic Latta Smith; February 6, 1870; Lansing, Michigan, U.S.
- Died: August 6, 1954 (aged 84); Beverly Hills, California, U.S.
- Education: University of Michigan; University of Berlin
- Known for: Football player/Automotive pioneer

Frederic Latta Smith (February 6, 1870 – August 6, 1954) was a pioneer of the automobile business. He was one of the founders of the Olds Motor Works in 1899 and of General Motors Corporation in 1908. He was also the president of the Association of Licensed Automobile Manufacturers in its early years.

== Early life ==
Smith was born in 1870 in Lansing, Michigan. He was the son of copper and lumber magnate, Samuel Latta Smith (1830–1917), and Eliza Cordelia (Seager) Smith. He attended Lansing High School and the Michigan Military Academy, graduating from MMA in 1886.

Smith enrolled at the University of Michigan in October 1886. While attending Michigan, he played college football and was the starting quarterback for the 1888 Michigan Wolverines football team. He also won the lightweight wrestling championship medal. He was also a member of the Zeta Psi fraternity at Michigan. Smith's cousin, Henry Rogers Seager, was also a member of the same fraternity at Michigan and later became a noted economist.

Smith graduated from Michigan in 1890 and subsequently studied at the University of Berlin from 1891 to 1892.

== Automobile business ==
In 1892, Smith became employed as an agent for land interests in Michigan's Upper Peninsula. As of 1897, he maintained his office at 1013 Woodward Avenue in Detroit.

In August 1897, Ransom E. Olds, founded the Olds Motor Vehicle Company in Lansing, Michigan. In 1899, Smith was one of the founders of the new Olds Motor Works. Smith together with his father and Henry Russel provided the financial backing for the new venture, which was moved from Lansing to Detroit. Smith's father became the company's president, with Ransom Olds as general manager and Frederic Smith as secretary and treasurer.

In 1901, the Olds Motor Works released the Curved Dash Oldsmobile. It was this car, rather than Henry Ford's Model T, that was the first mass-produced, low-priced American motor vehicle. In 1901, a fire destroyed the company's factory, and a new factory was quickly built to replace it.

In 1902, Frederic Smith took charge of the newly built Olds Motor Works factory. He gave responsibility for sales to Roy Chapin, another promising young automotive pioneer from Lansing. Chapin led the way in developing a network of sales franchises for Olds around the country. At one point, Chapin's mother wrote to Frederic Smith and complained that her son had been given too many responsibilities for too little pay. Smith responded by telling Mrs. Chapin that her son was "the brightest and most promising of all the young managers at Olds."

In the infancy of the automobile industry in Detroit, the carmakers formed the Association of Licensed Automobile Manufacturers ("ALAM"), an organization that one historian has called "a monopolistic combine." The members pooled their patent rights (including the Selden patent) and used their "patent pool" to permit or deny the right to manufacture petroleum-based automobiles. Frederic Smith became the president of ALAM and in 1903 sought to use the power of ALAM to try to deny Henry Ford membership in the organization. A special subcommittee with Smith as its sole member was formed to review Ford's admission to ALAM. Ford's plan to assemble one inexpensive model at a low price point was a threat to Olds' low-end vehicles. Accordingly, Smith told Ford that he must "dismantle, disband, and depart Detroit." In a personal meeting with Ford, Smith told him to "abandon all hope of becoming an automobile manufacturer." The confrontation led to years of litigation between Ford and ALAM.

Frederic Smith and Ransom Olds clashed frequently. In 1903, Smith removed Olds from the position of general manager and took the position for himself.

The Olds Motor Works was bought by General Motors in 1908. The Smiths had effectively run Olds Motor Works into bankruptcy through their incompetence. Smith has been credited, along with William C. Durant, as "one of the founders of General Motors Corp."

== Later years ==
Smith moved to Beverly Hills, California, in 1941. In August 1954, he died at his home at 603 N. Bedford Drive in Beverly Hills. He was survived by his wife, Norah.
