= M1918 Ford 3-ton tank =

American light tank

Ford 3-ton
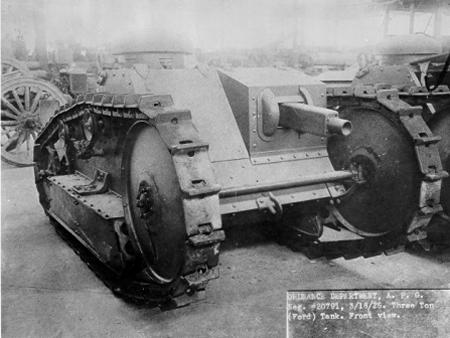
- Type: Tankette / Light tank
- Place of origin: United States

Service history
- In service: 1918-1919

Production history
- Designer: US Ordnance Department
- No. built: 15

Specifications
- Mass: 3 tons
- Length: 13 ft 8 in (4.17 m)
- Width: 5 ft 6 in (1.68 m)
- Height: 5 ft 3 in (1.60 m)
- Crew: 2 (Driver and gunner)
- Armor: 1/4 to 1/2 inches
- Main armament: M1917 Marlin machine gun or M1917 Browning machine gun
- Engine: Two Ford Model T engines 45 hp (34 kW)
- Power/weight: 10.4 hp/t (7.8 kW/t)
- Operational range: 55 km (34 mi)
- Maximum speed: 12.8 km/h (8 mph)

The Ford 3-ton tank, also known as the Ford Model 1918 (M1918) was one of the first indigenous tank designs by the U.S. It was a small two-man, one-gun tank. Essentially the first tankette, it was armed with an M1917 Marlin machine gun, later an M1917 Browning machine gun, and could reach a maximum speed of 8 mph (13 km/h). The 3-ton had a 17-US-gallon (64 L) fuel tank that gave it a maximum range of 34 miles (55 km).

== History ==
Design of the 3-ton tank started in mid-1917, before which American tank forces had been largely equipped with British or French examples. The 3-ton was a two-man tank designed so that American forces could use another tank besides the Renault FT in battle, and was designed around the FT but as a cheaper alternative. Its two Ford Model T engines were controlled by the driver/commander, seated at the front with a gunner beside him who had control of a .30-06 (7.62×63mm) machine gun (either an M1917 Marlin machine gun or M1917 Browning machine gun) on a limited-traverse mount (21 degrees) with approximately 2,000 rounds of ammunition.

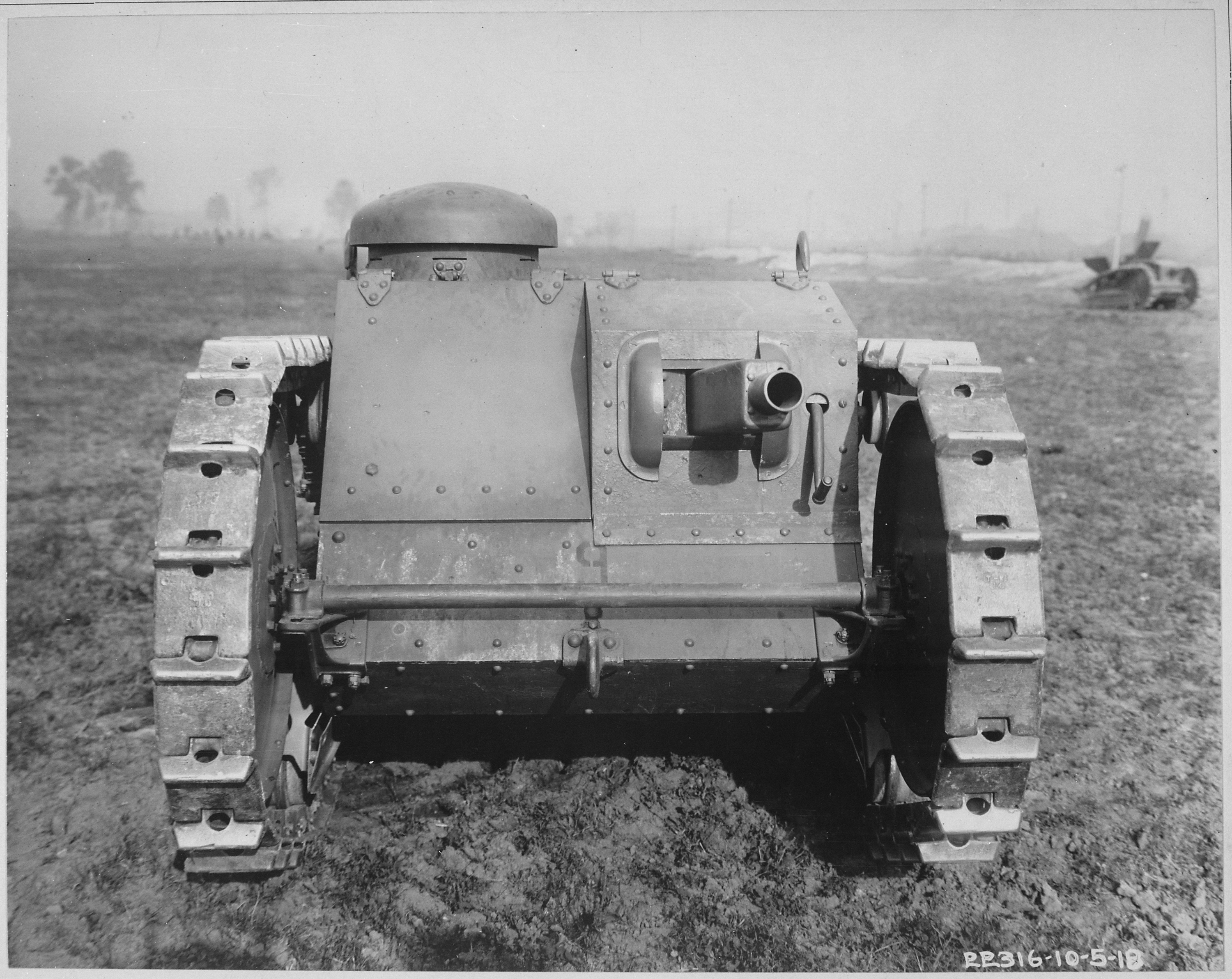
Front view of the M1918

The initial production run of the 3-ton was of fifteen vehicles; one of these was sent to France for testing in October 1918. Some of the vehicles were tested in France as 75mm artillery tractors from January 1919.

A contract for 15,000 of these vehicles was awarded; however, the U.S. tank corps felt it did not meet the requirements they wanted. The contract for the 15,000 tanks was ended by the Armistice, leaving only the fifteen original vehicles produced.

The French Army evaluated the Ford 3-ton tank and thought it inferior to the native Renault FT. However, the 3-ton tank was seen to have potential as a cheap, light, all-terrain artillery tractor, especially for batteries of the Canon de 75 modèle 1897. One thousand five-hundred 3-ton tanks were ordered from Ford but the Armistice occurred before any were delivered and the order was cancelled.

A larger three-man version with a 37mm gun in a turret was ordered to address the failings of the 3-ton tank

== Survivors ==
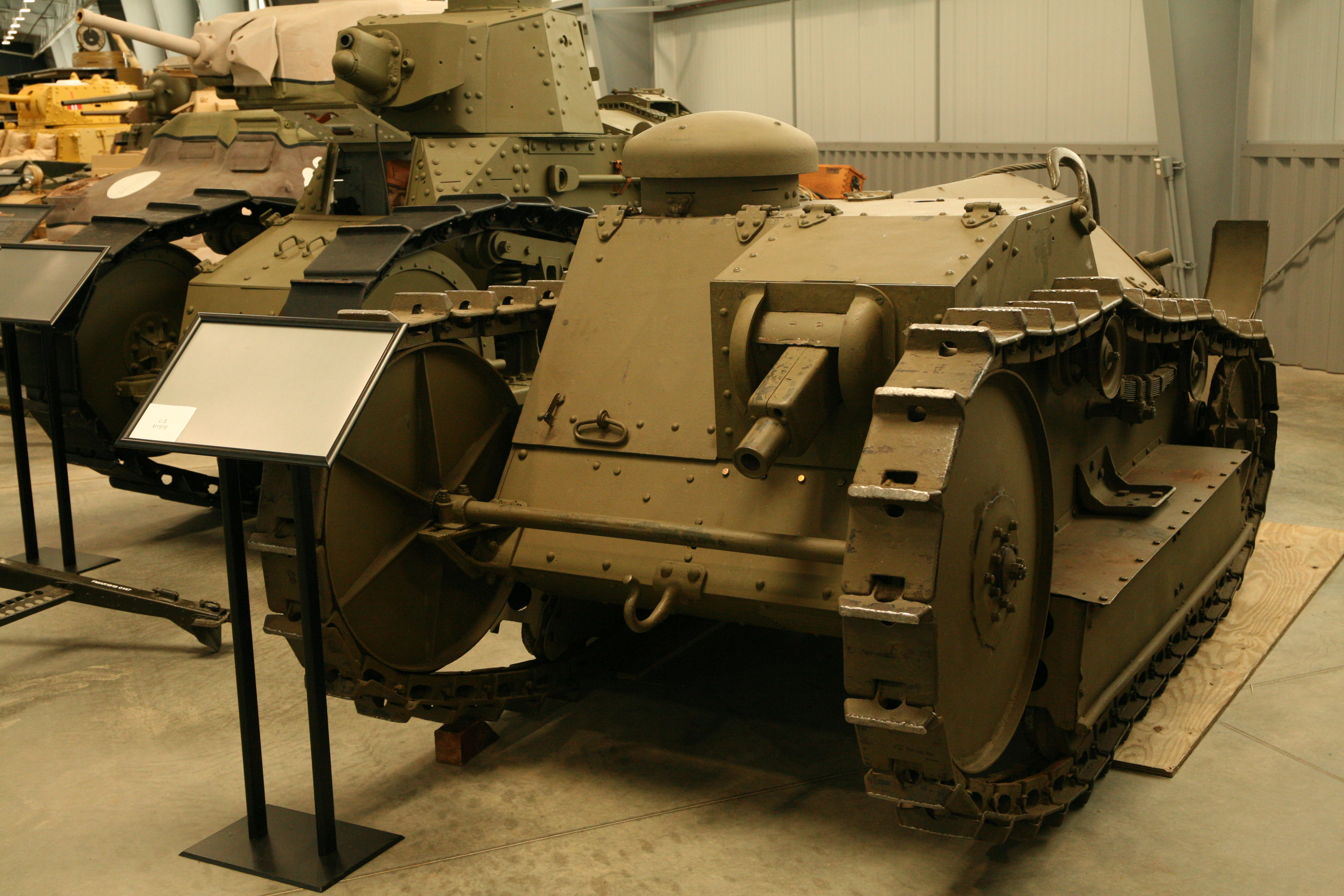
M1918 at the U.S. Army Armor & Cavalry Collection

- There are two known survivors; one is at the U.S. Army Armor & Cavalry Collection at Fort Benning, Georgia; the other is with the Ordnance Collection at Fort Lee, Virginia.

== See also ==
- Mark VIII tank
- Renault FT
- Tanks of the United States
- History of the tank
- History of Ford Motor Company
- List of Ford vehicles
