= Alexander Winton =

British transportation innovator (1860–1932)

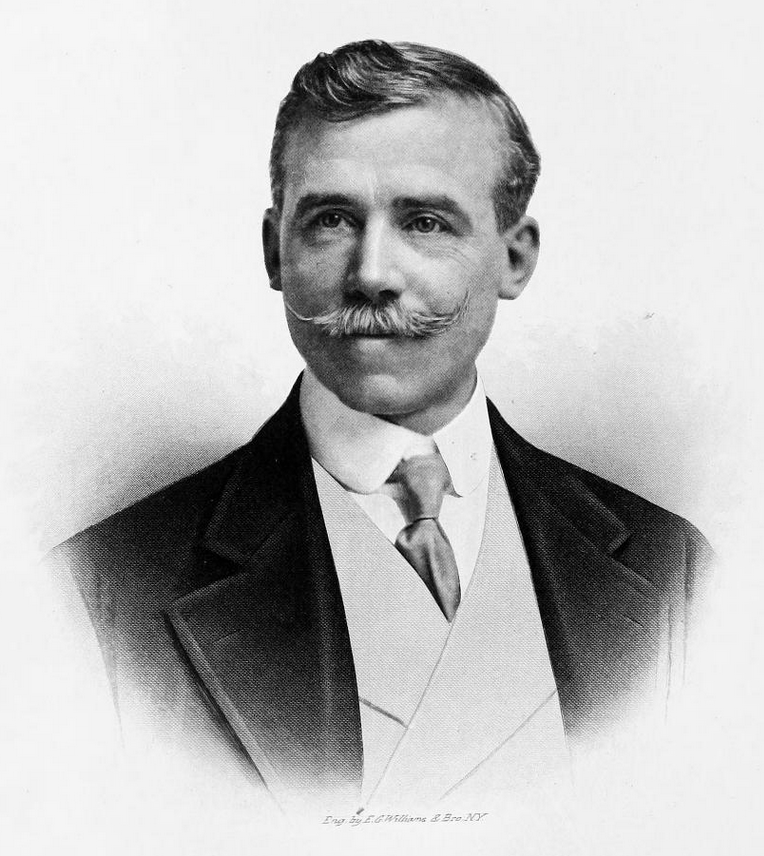
- Alexander Winton
- Born: June 20, 1860; Grangemouth, Scotland
- Died: June 21, 1932 (aged 72); Cleveland, Ohio
- Occupations: Inventor and manufacturer
- Known for: Winton Motor Carriage Company
- Awards: Inducted into the National Inventors Hall of Fame

Alexander Winton (June 20, 1860 – June 21, 1932) was a Scottish-American bicycle, automobile, and diesel engine designer and inventor, as well as a businessman and racecar driver. Winton founded the Winton Motor Carriage Company in 1897 in Cleveland, Ohio, making the city an important hub of early automotive manufacturing. His pioneering achievements in the automotive industry included taking one of the first long-distance journeys in America by car and developing one of the first commercial diesel engines. Winton left the automotive manufacturing business when he liquidated his car company in 1924 to focus on his powertrain engineering firm, Winton Gas Engine & Mfg. Co., which he had established twelve years earlier to focus on engine development. This business was sold to General Motors in 1930 and became the Cleveland Diesel Engine Division. Winton died in 1932 and is interred in Lake View Cemetery in Cleveland.

== Life ==
Winton was born in Grangemouth, Scotland. His father (also named Alexander) was a marine engineer, and young Alexander followed in his father's profession. He emigrated to the United States in 1879. For three years he worked at Delameter Iron Works, and for two years thereafter as a marine engineer on ocean vessels.

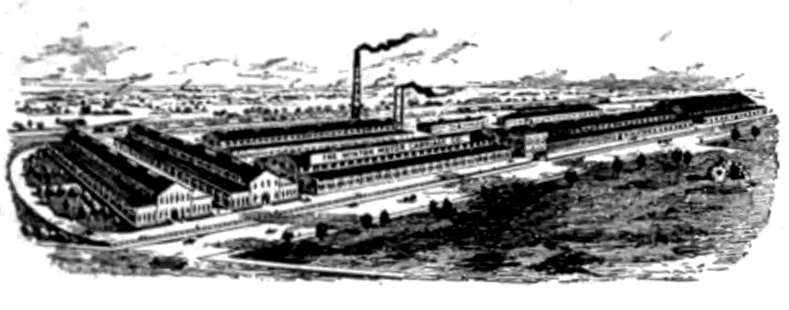
The Winton Motor Carriage Company factory covered 13 acres and employed 1200 workers in 1903.

In 1891, he founded Winton Bicycle Co., and in 1897 he founded the Winton Motor Carriage Company, a year after he had built his first motorcar. In July 1897 Winton embarked on one of the first long-distance journeys by car in America, traveling from Cleveland to New York City over the course of nine days. The purpose of the journey was twofold: Winton wanted to prove the reliability of his automobile, and he also sought to entice investors and enhance publicity. Winton took a similar and better-publicized journey in 1899.

On March 24, 1898, Winton sold a car to Robert Allison of Port Carbon, Pennsylvania, for approximately $1000. The transaction is considered one of the first commercial sales of a domestic gas-powered vehicle in America.

Another early Winton customer was James Ward Packard. Purportedly, after being disappointed by the quality and performance of his Winton automobile, Packard contacted Winton to express his concerns, and provide suggestions and improvements. Winton then challenged him to build a better car. The affronted Packard did so, establishing the Packard Motor Car Company in 1899.

Also in 1898, Henry Ford was recommended by Winton's chief engineer for a position in the company. After interviewing him, Winton was unimpressed and did not to hire him. Three years later, in 1901, Henry Ford defeated him at a race at Grosse Pointe, Michigan. By 1908, Henry Ford had introduced the Ford Model T, which revolutionized automotive and American history.

Winton invented the world's first semi-truck in 1898 and sold his first manufactured semi-truck in 1899. When he started manufacturing cars, he wanted to ship them directly to customers without putting mileage on them. Hence, he developed a car hauler, and soon was selling car haulers to other manufacturers. This is the first instance of a semi-trailer truck product.

The Winton Motor Carriage Company grew rapidly after the turn of the 20th century. In 1902 three buildings were built, and four more were added in 1903. The company employed 1200 workers in 1903.

Winton was a member of Association of Licensed Automobile Manufacturer (ALAM), an organization formed to challenge the litigation of the fledgling automobile industry by George B. Selden and the Electric Vehicle Company.

In 1912, Winton founded the Winton Gas Engine & Mfg. Co. After producing the first marine engine Winton designed, the company switched to producing diesel engines based on a European design. The business was renamed Winton Engine Works in 1916, and focused on marine and locomotive diesel engines. Winton relinquished leadership in 1928. By 1930 the company was sold to General Motors, and was renamed Cleveland Diesel Engine Division.

Winton was a prolific inventor, with over 100 patents in the fields of motor cars and engines. He also had several bicycle inventions. He allowed free use of his patents when a question of safety was involved.

=== Racing career ===
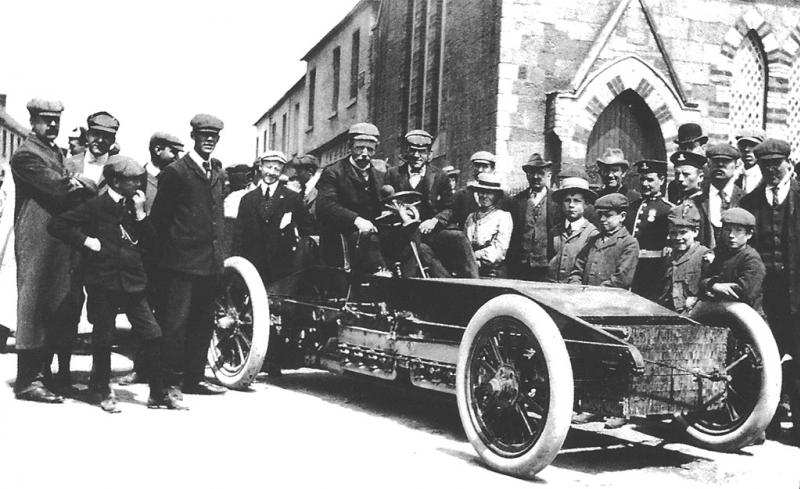
Winton at the 1903 Gordon Bennett trophy race in Athy, Ireland

Winton was a pioneer in using racing to promote his automobile business, because of the attention racing garnered as well as the focus on technical innovation. One of his first famous races was against Henry Ford, which he lost in 1901. In 1902 he built the first of three custom race cars; all were called the 'Bullet'. Bullet No. 1 was the first car to win a sanctioned race at Daytona Beach, Florida. Bullet No. 2 was built for the Gordon Bennett Cup in Ireland in 1903. It was one of the first 8-cylinder automobiles built. It suffered mechanical difficulties and did not complete the race, although after being brought back to the United States Barney Oldfield drove it to a near-record 80 miles per hour (130 km/h) at Daytona. Winton retired from racing, but built a Bullet No. 3 which Oldfield raced around the United States during his career.

=== Family ===
He married Jeanie Muir McGlashan (died 1903) in 1883. They had six children: Helen, James, Agnes, Jeanie, Cathrine, and Alexander. He married LaBelle McGlashan (died 1924) in 1906; they had two children: LaBelle and Clarice. He married Marion Campbell in 1927 and they divorced in 1930. In 1930, he married Mary Ellen Avery.

== Legacy ==
He was inducted into the Automotive Hall of Fame in 2005, and National Inventors Hall of Fame in 2006.

The Winton Place Condominium in Lakewood, Ohio, was built in 1962 on the site of his former mansion.

== Sources ==
- Thomas F. Saal, Bernard J. Golias Famous But Forgotten: The Story of Alexander Winton, Automotive Pioneer and Industrialist, Golias Pub., 1997, ISBN 9780965378512
