= Detroit Automobile Company =

Defunct American motor vehicle manufacturer

Coordinates: 42.365766°N 83.073593°W

- Founded: August 5, 1899; 127 years ago
- Defunct: November 20, 1901
- Fate: Reorganized
- Successor: Henry Ford Company
- Headquarters: Detroit, Michigan

The Detroit Automobile Company (DAC) was an early American automobile manufacturer founded on August 5, 1899, in Detroit, Michigan. It was the first venture of its kind in Detroit. Automotive mechanic Henry Ford attracted the financial backing of twelve investors; Detroit Mayor William Maybury, William H. Murphy and others. As with many early car ventures, the company floundered, and it was dissolved in January 1901. Twenty vehicles were built and $86,000 ($2.61 million in 2019) of investment was lost.

== History ==
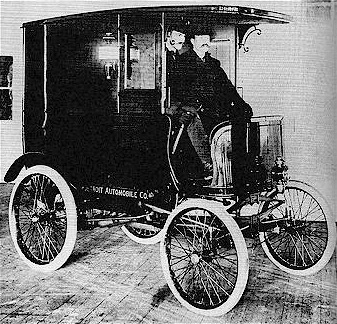
The company's first product was a delivery truck, completed in January 1900.

=== Foundation ===
The company was founded with a paid-up capital of $15,000 ($455,490 in 2019). Henry Ford managed the manufacturing plant at 1343 Cass Avenue and Amsterdam in Detroit; initially with no pay until he left his job at the Detroit Edison Company, after which he was given a monthly salary of $150 ($4,555 in 2019). He refused to put a car into production until he had perfected it to his satisfaction, infuriating investors who quickly began to lose confidence in Ford's ability to bring a product to market. The company's primary objective was to make a profit for its investors, who had seen the Oldsmobile plant, where the Curved Dash Oldsmobile was built, which was profitable for its owner Samuel Smith.

The company's first product was a gasoline-powered delivery truck engineered by Ford and completed in January 1900. It received favorable coverage in a local newspaper, but was not without its flaws; it was slow, heavy, unreliable and complicated to manufacture. Later in life, Ford recalled this period as one that was driven by profit rather than innovation.

A catalog produced by Detroit Automobile Company in 1900 showed, with a cost analysis, that the automobile was cheaper to maintain and operate than a horse and vehicle. Little is known about the company's designs.

Table 1. Detroit Automobile Car Costs
Automobile
Original cost	$1,000
Cost of operating, 1/4 cents per mile, 25 miles per day	$114
New tires	$100
Repairs	$50
Painting vehicle four times	$100
	$1,364
Horse and Vehicle
Original cost, horse, harness and vehicle	$500
Cost of keeping horse five years	$1,200
Shoeing the horse	$180
Repairs on vehicle, including rubber tires	$150
Repairs on harness, $10 per year	$50
Painting vehicle four times	$100
	$2,180

=== Demise ===
The Detroit Automobile Company was reorganized into the Henry Ford Company on November 20, 1901, after Ford gained further backing from investors because of his racing success. It later became the Cadillac Company under the ownership of Henry Leland, who came in subsequently after Ford had left. The factory location for the Detroit Automobile Company is less than a mile away southeast from Mr. Ford's Piquette Avenue Plant, which opened four years later.
