= Henry M. Leland =

American engineer, machinist, and entrepreneur (1843–1932)

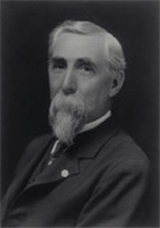
- Leland in 1909
- Born: February 16, 1843; Vermont, U.S.
- Died: March 26, 1932 (aged 89); Detroit, Michigan, U.S.
- Known for: Founder of Cadillac and Lincoln

Signature
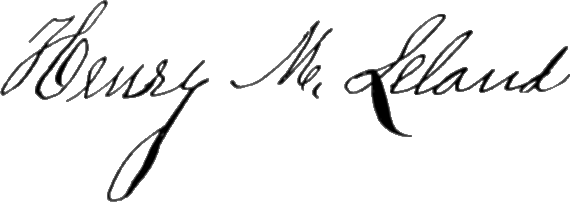

Henry Martyn Leland (February 16, 1843 – March 26, 1932) was an American machinist, inventor, engineer, and automotive entrepreneur. He founded the two premier American luxury automotive marques, Cadillac and Lincoln.

== Early years ==
Henry M. Leland was born to Leander and Zilpha Leland, the youngest of 8, in Vermont in 1843. Sources differ on the town of his birth (Danville versus Barton); he grew up in Barton. He learned engineering and precision machining in the Brown & Sharpe plant at Providence, Rhode Island. He subsequently worked in the firearms industry, including at Colt. These experiences in toolmaking, metrology, and manufacturing steeped him in the 19th-century zeitgeist of interchangeability.

He applied this expertise to the nascent motor industry as early as 1870 as a principal in the machine shop Leland & Faulconer, and later was a supplier of engines to Ransom E. Olds's Olds Motor Vehicle Company, later to be known as Oldsmobile. He also invented the electric barber clippers, and for a short time produced a unique toy train, the Leland-Detroit Monorail.

== Cadillac ==
Leland created the Cadillac automobile, later bought out by General Motors. In 1902, William Murphy and his partners at the Henry Ford Company hired Leland to appraise the company's factory and tooling prior to liquidation. Leland completed the appraisal, but he advised Murphy and his partners that they were making a mistake to liquidate, and suggested they instead reorganize, building a new car powered by a single-cylinder engine Leland had originally developed for Oldsmobile. The directors lost no time in renaming the company Cadillac. At Cadillac, Leland applied many modern manufacturing principles to the fledgling automotive industry, including the use of interchangeable parts. Alfred P. Sloan, longtime president and chair of General Motors, considered Leland to be "one of those mainly responsible for bringing the technique of interchangeable parts into automobile manufacturing."

The Cadillac won the Dewar Trophy for 1908, which was actually presented in 1909.

Leland sold Cadillac to General Motors on July 29, 1909, for $4.5 million, but remained as an executive until 1917. With Charles Kettering, he developed a self-starter for the Cadillac, which won its second Dewar Trophy in 1913 as a result. He prodded Kettering to design a workable electric starter after Byron Carter, a Cadillac engineer, was hit in the head by a starting crank when the engine backfired which later resulted in death.

He left General Motors in a dispute with company founder William C. Durant over producing materiel during World War I. Cadillac had been asked to build Liberty aircraft engines but Durant was a pacifist.

== Lincoln ==
Leland formed the Lincoln Motor Company in 1917 with a $10,000,000 wartime contract to build the V12 Liberty aircraft engine. The company was named after Abraham Lincoln, who was the first President for whom Leland ever voted (1864). After the war, the company was reorganized, and the Lincoln Motor Company Plant was retooled to manufacture luxury automobiles. The V8 engine used in the first Lincoln automobiles is said to be influenced by the Liberty engine's design.

In 1922, Lincoln became insolvent and was bought out by Henry Ford's Ford Motor Company. Ford's bid of $8 million was the only bid at a receivers sale. Ford had first offered $5 million, but the judge would not accept it for a well-equipped company whose assets were conservatively estimated at $16 million. Ford had deliberately low-balled his offer as revenge for Leland's role in the creation of Cadillac.

After the sale, Leland and his son Wilfred continued to run the company, believing they would still have full control to run the company as they saw fit. Ford assigned a number of their employees to Lincoln, ostensibly to learn from the latter. However, it soon became clear they were there to streamline their production and stop the loss of money that had bankrupted Lincoln. Relations between the workers of Henry Ford and Leland continued to deteriorate.

On June 10, 1922, Ford executive Ernest Liebold arrived at Lincoln to ask for the resignation of Wilfred Leland. When it became clear that Liebold had the full authority of Henry Ford, Henry Leland resigned as well. That afternoon both men were shown out of the factory they had created.

The Lincoln continues to be part of the luxury line of Ford to the present. Leland had no connection to the Lincoln Motor Car Works, a marque sold by Sears-Roebuck from 1905 to 1915.

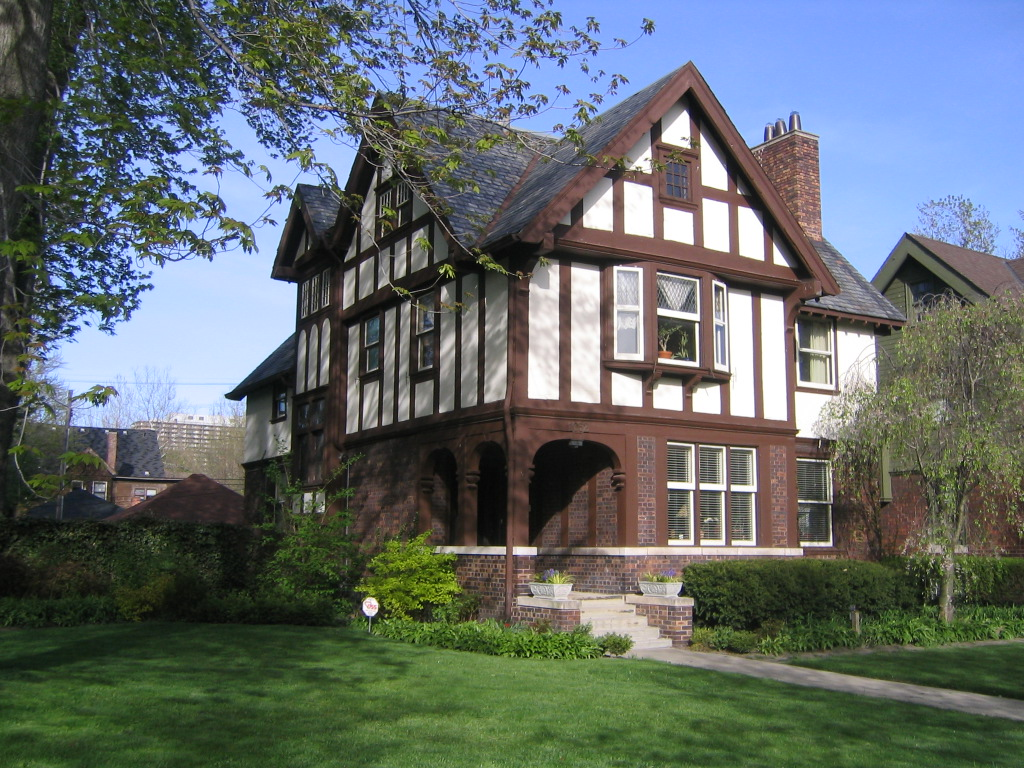
Henry Leland house, in the Indian Village district of east Detroit

== Politics ==
Progressivism in Detroit was energized by upper-middle-class men and women who felt a civic duty to uplift society by freeing it from the tyranny of corrupt politicians who worked hand in hand with unscrupulous saloonkeepers. Leland was an important leader, with his base in the Detroit Citizens League. Supported by Detroit's business, professional, and Protestant religious communities, the League campaigned for a new city charter in 1918, an anti-saloon ordinance, and the open shop whereby a worker could get a job even if he did not belong to a labor union.

== Personal life ==
Leland was the son of Leander Leland and Zilpha Tifft. He married Ellen Rhoda Hull (April 24, 1846 – January 15, 1914), the daughter of Elias Hull. They had three children: Martha Gertrude (1868–1912), Wilfred Chester (November 7, 1869 – 1958), and Miriam Edith (1872–1894). They were all born in Millbury, Massachusetts.

Henry M. Leland died in Detroit on March 26, 1932. He is buried there in Woodmere Cemetery.

== Bibliography ==
- Bak, Richard (September 29, 2003). Henry and Edsel : The Creation of the Ford Empire. Wiley. ISBN 0-471-23487-7.
- Lacey, Robert (1986). Ford: The Men and the Machine. Boston: Little, Brown & Company. ISBN 978-0-316-51166-7. LCCN 86010642..
- Roe, Joseph Wickham (1916), English and American Tool Builders, New Haven, Connecticut: Yale University Press, LCCN 16011753. Reprinted by McGraw-Hill, New York and London, 1926 (LCCN 27-24075); and by Lindsay Publications, Inc., Bradley, Illinois (ISBN 978-0-917914-73-7).
- Sloan, Alfred P. (1964), McDonald, John (ed.), My Years with General Motors, Garden City, NY, US: Doubleday, LCCN 64011306, OCLC 802024. Republished in 1990 with a new introduction by Peter Drucker (ISBN 978-0385042352).
