= Henry Ford Company =

Former automotive company

Coordinates: 42.365766°N 83.073593°W

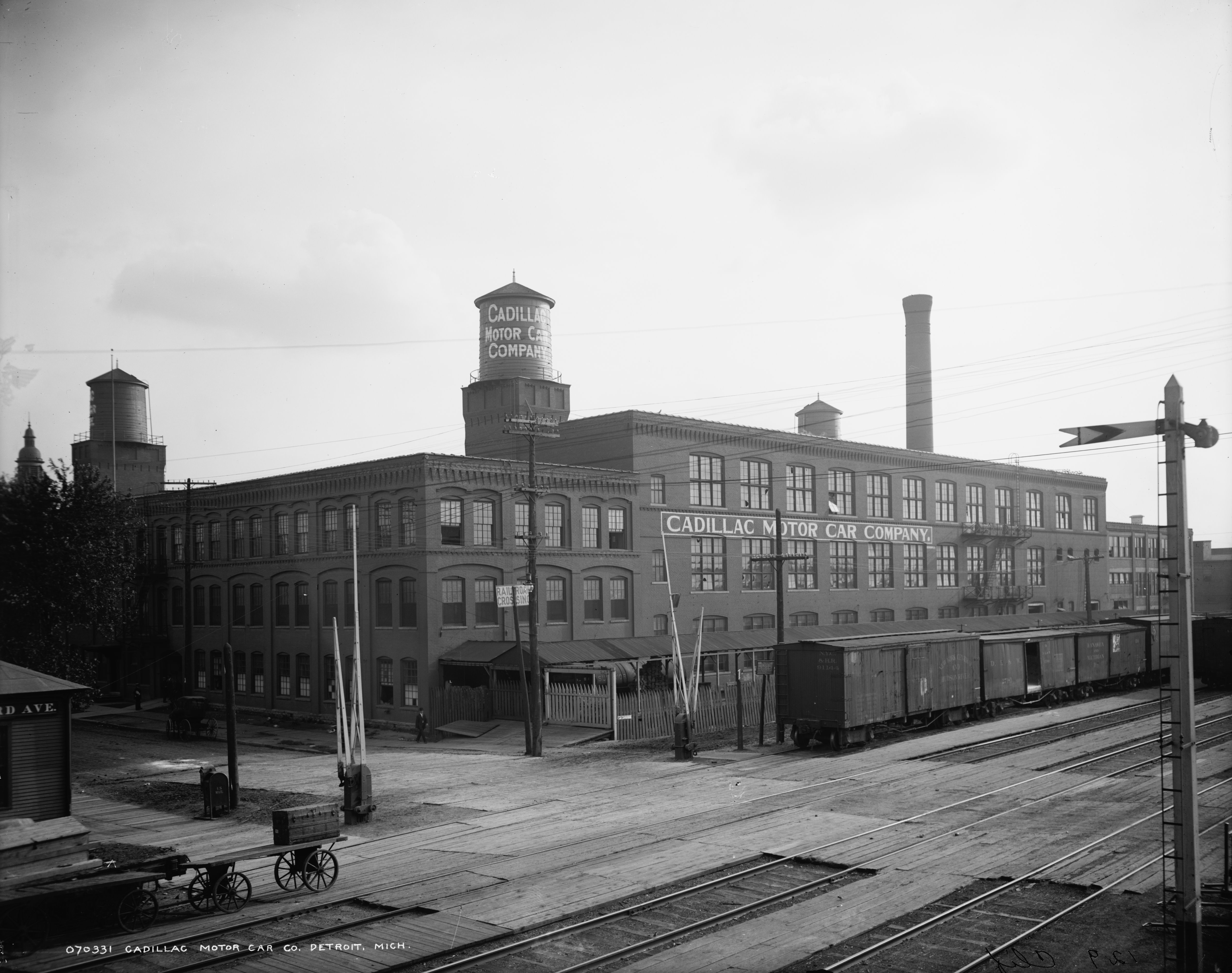
- Detroit Assembly Plant
- Predecessor: Detroit Automobile Company
- Founded: November 3, 1901
- Defunct: August 22, 1902
- Fate: Reorganized
- Successors: Cadillac Automobile Company; Ford Motor Company
- Headquarters: Detroit, Michigan

The Henry Ford Company was an automobile manufacturer active from 1901 to 1902. Named after Henry Ford, it was his second company after the Detroit Automobile Company, which had been founded in 1899. The Henry Ford Company was founded November 1901 from the reorganization of the Detroit Automobile Company. The company, much like the Detroit Automobile Company, was plagued by disputes between Ford and his investors, and Ford left in 1902. Later that year, the company was reorganized as the Cadillac Automobile Company under the suggestion of Henry M. Leland. Cadillac, whose early vehicles were identical in design to those of Ford's later Ford Motor Company except for the engine, would develop a reputation for precision engineering and was acquired by the nascent General Motors (GM) in 1909, becoming GM's luxury marque. Ford would eventually find success with the Ford Motor Company, and is considered one of the primary pioneers of the automobile.

== Background ==
The Detroit Automobile Company was founded in 1899 and made its first vehicle in January 1900.

== Collapse and reorganization ==
In March 1902, Ford left the company following a dispute with his financial backers, William Murphy and Lemuel Bowen, as Ford was devoting considerable time to the sport of auto racing and his Ford 999 race car. In a final settlement, Ford left with his name and $900; he went on to start the Ford Motor Company in 1903 at the Ford Mack Avenue Plant.

In August 1902, Henry M. Leland, a local manufacturer of precision gears and engines, was brought in by the investors to appraise the plant and equipment prior to selling them. Instead, Leland persuaded them to continue in the automobile business, showing them an engine he had designed a year earlier for Olds Motor Works that was not adopted due to a fire at the latter's premises. The Henry Ford Company reorganized that year as the Cadillac Automobile Company, named in honor of Antoine de la Mothe Cadillac, the founder of Detroit.

== Subsequent history ==
=== Cadillac ===
Cadillac's first car, the Cadillac Runabout and Tonneau, was completed on October 17, 1902, the 10 horsepower (7.5 kW) Cadillac. Based on Henry Ford's design (except for the engine, designed by Leland & Faulconer), it was practically identical to the 1903 Ford Model A.

Located in Detroit at 450 Amsterdam Street, at the intersection of Cass Avenue and Amsterdam Street, the original manufacturing plant was designed by architectural firm George C. Mason & Son, and remained in operation under Cadillac until 1921, when the Detroit Assembly factory was built at Clark Street. The factory after Leland made some improvements, was 275,000 square feet, with its own forge, a machine shop, and a foundry for both iron and brass. The factory ran 24 hours a day, producing 40 Cadillacs in that time period. The original location is approximately 2 miles east of the current Detroit/Hamtramck Assembly, where Cadillacs are currently built. It is approximately half a mile southwest from Cadillac Place, GM's headquarters from 1922 until 2001, when GM moved to the GM Renaissance Center next to the Detroit River.

=== Ford ===
Henry Ford founded the Ford Motor Company in 1903 and began producing the Model A that year. The Model A was successful, returning a profit for the Ford Motor Company and securing its financial well-being. Ford expanded with the Model B and Model C in 1904, expanding its lineup to seven models by 1907. Ford adopted mass production with a new model, the Model T, which it introduced in 1908. It proved wildly successful, and by 1914 Ford had produced almost 90 percent of the world's automobiles. By the time it ended production in 1927, more than 15 million had been sold. In 1999, a panel of 126 automotive experts, combined with the votes of the general public, named the Model T as the Car of the Century.

== External sources ==
- Henry Ford Company Amsterdam Avenue factory
- Henry Ford Company
- Henry Ford's first car company

== See also ==
- List of automobile manufacturers

== Works cited ==
- Kimes, Beverly Rae (1989). Standard Catalog of American Cars, 1805–1942. Iola, Wisconsin: Krause Publications. ISBN 9780873410458.
