= Alexander Y. Malcomson =

American coal dealer

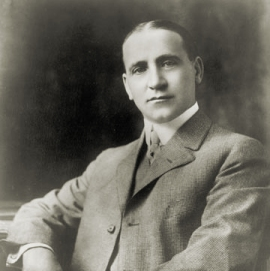
- Born: June 7, 1865; Dalry, Ayrshire, Scotland
- Died: August 1, 1923 (aged 58); Ann Arbor, Michigan
- Occupation: Coal dealer
- Known for: Co-founding Ford Motor Company
- Spouse: Sarah J. Mickleborough
- Children: Mary J., Helen J., Grace L., George W., Alexander Y., and Allan R. Malcomson

Alexander Young Malcomson (June 7, 1865 – August 1, 1923) was a coal dealer from Detroit, Michigan, who bankrolled Henry Ford's first successful foray into automobile manufacturing: the Ford Motor Company.

== Early life ==
Alexander Young Malcomson was born June 7, 1865, in Dalry, Ayrshire, Scotland, and emigrated to Detroit at the age of 15, coming over with his widower father and staying with his uncle Joseph and family. He immediately began working in a grocery store, then went into business for himself after purchasing a small grocery. He soon switched to dealing in coal, eventually buying out several competitors and emerging as a major dealer, owning six coal yards by 1902. In addition to his coal yards, Malcomson invested in a variety of projects outside of the coal business. In 1895, Malcomson hired a young clerk, James Couzens (later mayor of Detroit and US senator), to work at his firm.

Malcomson married Sarah J. Mickleborough in 1889 and had six children: Mary J., Helen J., Grace L., George W., Alexander Y., and Allan R. Malcomson. Sarah died c. 1902 and he then married Alice Schofield in 1903, a marriage which produced two daughters, Dorothy J. and Margaret A. Malcomson.

== Henry Ford ==
Malcomson knew Henry Ford when the latter had worked at the Detroit Edison Co. In 1902, with his involvement in the Henry Ford Company coming to an end, Ford approached Malcomson to bankroll a new automotive company. Malcomson, although overextended with his other investments, was able to raise $3000 With this capital, Malcomson and Ford agreed to form a company, Ford & Malcomson, to develop a new automobile. Details of the partnership were written down and signed by each man, and witnessed by C. Harold Wills. With Malcomson's backing, Ford designed the Model A, an inexpensive car designed to be sold for $750. In 1903, the firm moved to a new building on Mack Avenue, and soon Ford and Malcomson ("doing business as the Ford Motor Company") agreed to purchase over $160,000 in parts from John and Horace Dodge; additional purchases for smaller amounts were made from numerous suppliers.

However, the young firm quickly had trouble making payments to the Dodge brothers due to slow sales. Malcomson turned to John S. Gray, president of Detroit's German-American bank. Gray agreed to invest $10,500 in the automobile firm. Malcomson also convinced his young clerk, James J. Couzens, to invest, as well as the law partners John W. Anderson and Horace Rackham; in all, Malcomson brought a total of $28,000 cash to the company. On June 16, 1903, Ford and Malcomson was officially re-incorporated as Ford Motor Co., with Gray as president and Ford as vice-president. Ford and Malcomson each owned 255 shares of the company (25.5% apiece), while Gray, Rackham, Anderson, Couzens, and other investors received shares proportional to their investment. The Dodge brothers each received 10% of the shares in the new company in return for materials provided.

Both Malcomson and Gray had larger businesses to run than Ford Motor Co. To keep Henry Ford in check, Malcomson installed his clerk James Couzens (also a shareholder) at Ford Motor in a full-time position. In any case, the company was an immediate success. Earnings in the first six months were over $100,000, and the company declared a 100% stock dividend; in the first year, the company made over $250,000 profit. Malcomson wanted to increase profits, and, believing luxury cars were the most attractive sector of the automobile market, directed Ford to design and build the larger and more expensive Model B and Model K. Ford was reluctant, but Malcomson was backed by his majority coalition on the board, and Ford capitulated.

== The end at Ford ==
In 1905, to hedge his bets, Malcomson formed Aerocar to produce luxury automobiles. However, other board members at Ford became upset, because the Aerocar would compete directly with the Model K. They demanded Malcomson give up his shares in Ford. Malcomson refused. However, Henry Ford was still upset at being dictated to by Malcomson. With Couzens's help, and without Malcomson's involvement, Ford established the Ford Manufacturing Company, explicitly to make parts for Ford Motor. Ford Manufacturing charged Ford Motor inflated prices, shifting the profits to Ford Manufacturing and leaving Ford Motor profitless. Malcomson, recognizing that he had been outmaneuvered, sold his stock in Ford Motor to Henry Ford in 1906 for $175,000.

Malcomson plowed his profit from the sale of Ford stock back into Aerocar, building a factory and producing the Aerocar Model D and Model F. However, the cars were not very popular, and Aerocar went broke in 1908. He sold his factory to Hudson Motor Car and returned to the coal business, still owing money to his creditors.

However, Malcomson dove back into business, running his coal supply business. In 1913, he formed Malcomson and Houghten, a distributor of coal, coke, and building supplies. By his death, he had amassed an estimated $2,000,000, and his insurance policy of $633,250 was the fifth largest paid in that year.

Alexander Malcomson died of hypostatic pneumonia in Ann Arbor, Michigan, on August 1, 1923, at age 59, after a long illness.
