= Aerocar (1905 automobile) =

Defunct American motor vehicle manufacturer

Coordinates: 42.3622112°N 83.0190635°W

- Industry: Automobile
- Founded: 1905; 121 years ago
- Defunct: 1908; 118 years ago
- Fate: factory sold
- Successor: Hudson Motor Car Company
- Headquarters: Detroit, Michigan, United States
- Key people: Alexander Malcomson; Henry Ford
- Products: automobiles

The Aerocar is an American automobile that was built from 1906 until 1908 in Detroit, Michigan. Backed by Henry Ford's former partner, coal merchant Alexander Malcomson, the short-lived company offered an air-cooled four-cylinder luxury car which sold for $2,800.

The factory was sold to Hudson Motor Car Company.

== History ==
The Aerocar Motor Company was founded in late 1905 by entrepreneur Alexander Malcolmson, who was also the primary financial backer of the Ford Motor Company in 1903. The two had differing views on serving the marketplace with Malcomson focusing on profitability from more expensive cars in contrast to Henry Ford looking to develop cars for the low-priced market.

The company's name refers to the car's use of an air-cooled engine. An order was placed with Reeves Pulley Company to deliver 500 four-cylinder, 20 hp (15 kW; 20 PS) engines. A factory was built in Detroit at the corner of Mack Avenue and Beaufait Street. The Detroit News published an article on 3 December 1905, about Malcomson, the new Aerocar Company, and its plan to produce 500 touring cars during the year. This brought a response on 5 December 1905 from Ford's board of directors calling for Malcomson's resignation from the board.

Production began in February 1906 for a high-end car to compete with the automobiles on the market at that time, including Ford's Model K, and Aerocar reserved spaces at the major 1906 auto shows. By April, the company reported selling one car per week and was planning to build three per week. News reports during December 1905 boasted that Aerocar was manufacturing four cars per week, mostly the runabout version. By April 1907, the company announced intentions of buying a large office building near Woodward in Detroit. High fixed costs and low demand for its cars were factors for the company to file for bankruptcy on August 6, 1907, and the process of liquidation during October and November of that year included the sale of 25 new Aerocars "at half of production cost." A lawsuit in 1909 by Reeves against Aerocar's failure to fulfill its 500 engine contract indicated that only 319 were taken. Moreover, the $325 price was high for an "unremarkable, 1905 technology engine."

Malcolmson went back to the more lucrative coal business.

The Aerocar factory at Mack Avenue and Beaufait Street was leased in April 1909 to the Hudson Motor Car Company. The new company experienced rapid growth of its Model 20. Demand for that first 1910 model exceeded production capacity at the former Aerocar plant "in a matter of months." Hudson had Albert Kahn design a new factory that was built a few miles away at East Jefferson and Conner. This facility needed to be doubled in size in a couple of years and was producing 100 cars per day. Manufacturing of Hudson cars continued until August 1954 and the plant was purchased by General Motors in 1956 for metal fabrication of Cadillacs, but the facility was demolished in 1959–1960. The original Aerocar factory appeared to be "reasonably well maintained" as of 2012, and "some very old lettering on the east side of the building had the words The Aerocar Company in white paint on the red brick."

== Models ==
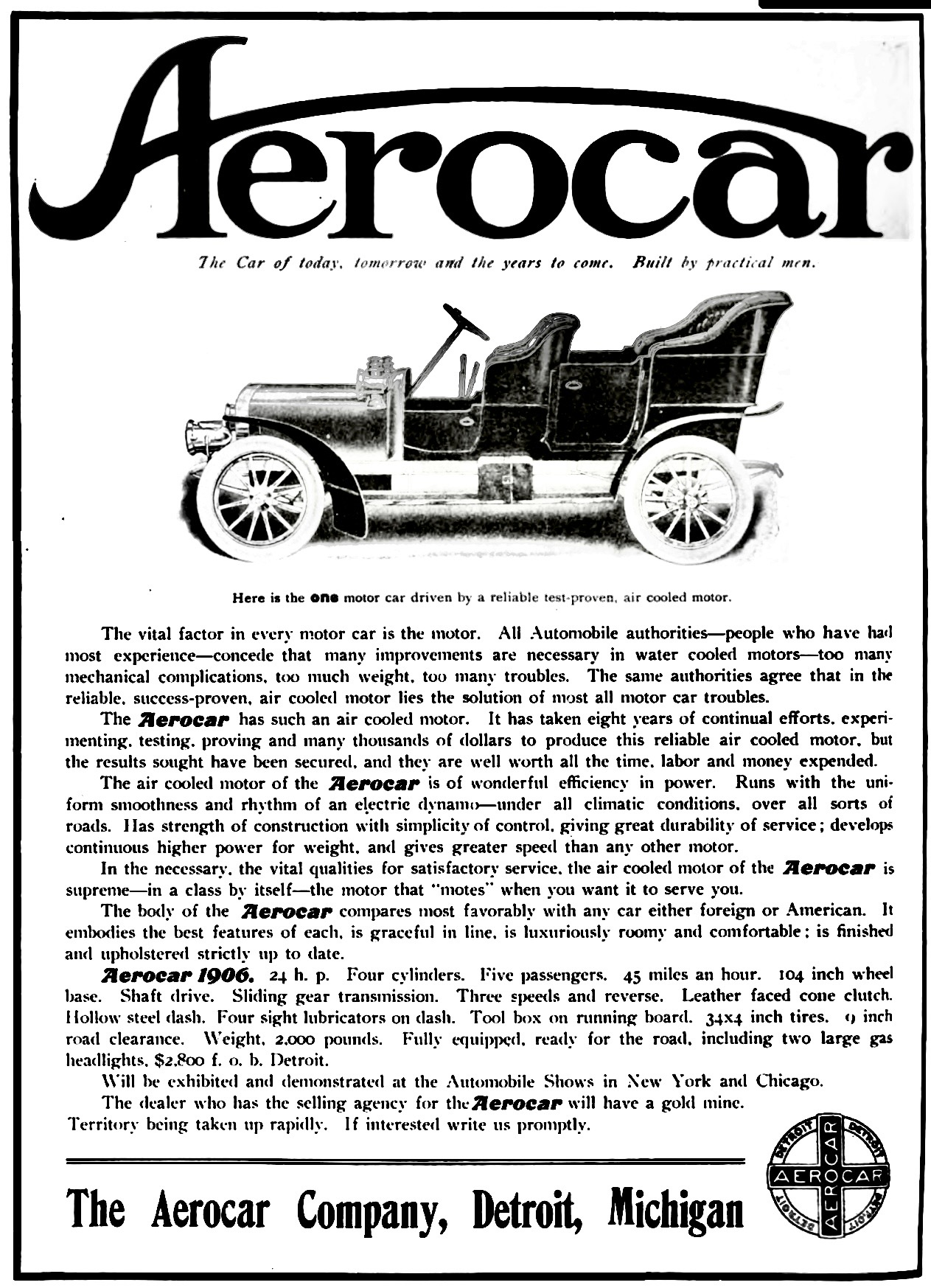
Aerocar advertisement (1905)

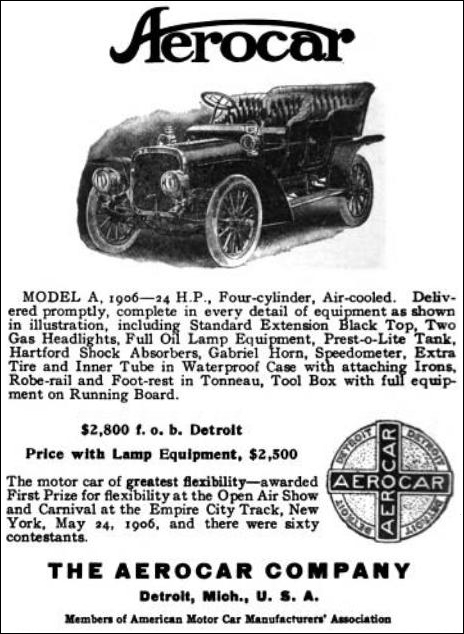
Aerocar advertisement, 1906

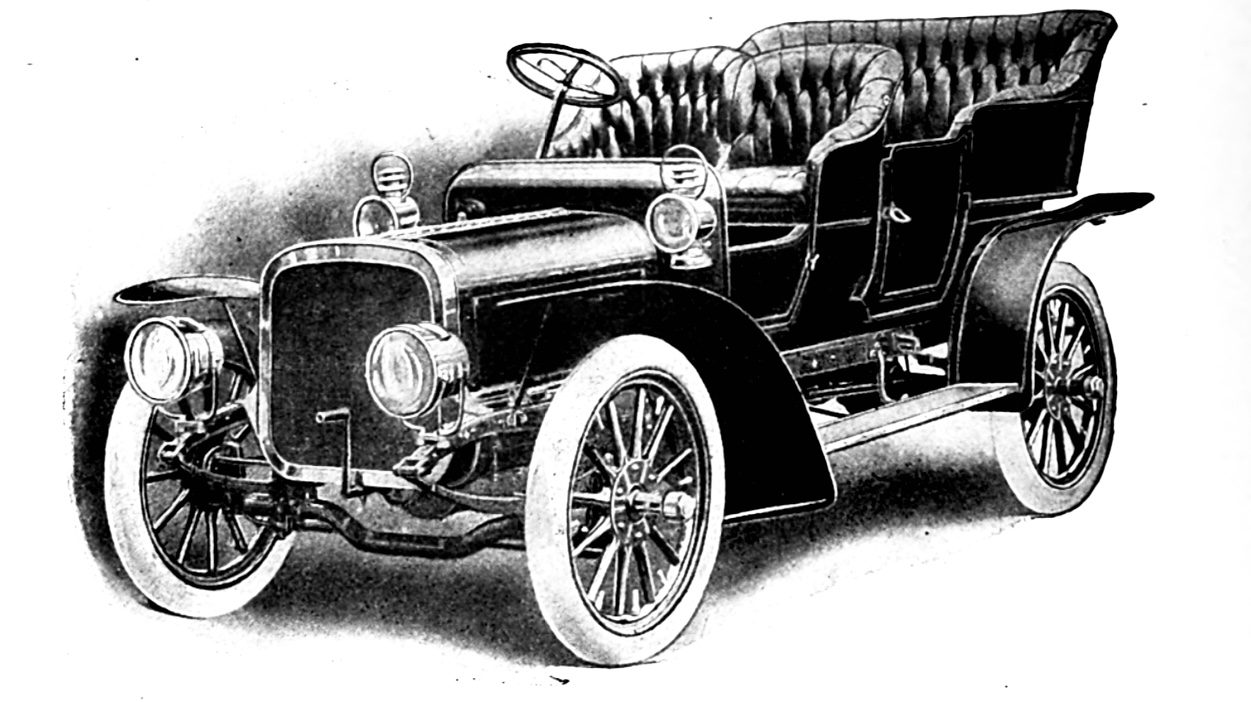
Aerocar Model A (1906)

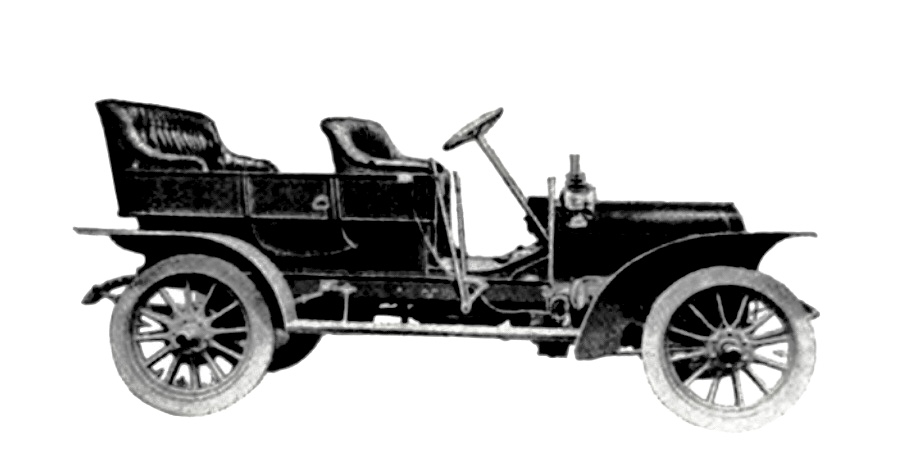
Aerocar Model D (1907-1908)

Trade promotion of the new Aerocar described it "The Car of today, tomorrow and the years to come. Built by practical men" with numerous claims as to its features as well as that "the dealer who has a selling agency for the Aerocar will have a gold mine." The first model priced at $2,800 was for a touring car equipped with an air-cooled engine with a three-speed sliding gear transmission, standard steering, tubular front axle, and single battery/timer/coil ignition.

The Model A was the only model produced in 1906, powered by a Reeves 24-horsepower, four-cylinder, air-cooled engine. The transmission had three gears. The maximum speed was 72 km/h = 45 miles an hour. The wheelbase was 2642 mm = 104 inch. The body was designed as a five-seater touring car. It came with a "Standard Extension Black Top" and two gas headlights as well as "Full Oil Lamp Equipment." The automobile had a Prest-o-Lite tank, Hartford shock absorbers, Gabriel horn, and a speedometer. It also came with an extra tire and inner tube in a waterproof case with attaching irons, robe-rail and a footrest in tonneau. A toolbox with full equipment was attached to the exterior running board. The air-cooled engine was later replaced by a Reeves water-cooled model.

Aerocar continued to build less expensive autos. Aerocar continued to use the 20 hp air-cooled Reeves engines in both the Model D and roadster, adding a 40 hp water-cooled touring in 1907 and 1908. The larger touring initially sold for $2,750 in 1907, then $2,200 in 1908.

Near the end, the more conventional Model F with a water-cooled 45 hp Rutenber engine was introduced, but it was too late.

The remaining cars were sold in 1908, with a grand total of approximately 300 Aerocars built.

== See also ==
- Brass Era car
