= Grace Ingersoll McGraw House =

- U.S. National Register of Historic Places
- Interactive map
- Location: 17315 East Jefferson Ave. Grosse Pointe, Michigan
- Coordinates: 42°23′04″N 82°54′27″W
- Built: 1927
- Architect: Charles A. Platt, J. Philip McDonnell
- Architectural style: Georgian Revival architecture
- NRHP reference No.: 100007934
- Added to NRHP: February 16, 2023

The Grace Ingersoll McGraw House is a private residence located at 17315 East Jefferson Avenue in Grosse Pointe, Michigan. It was listed on the National Register of Historic Places in 2023.

== History ==
Grace Ingersoll Butler was born in 1869 near Youngstown, Ohio. In 1890, she married furniture manufacturer Arthur McGraw. The couple moved to Detroit in the 1890s, where Grace Ingersoll McGraw became active in civic and social affairs as a member of the Daughters of the American Revolution and the Colonial Dames of America, as well as serving on the national board of trustees for the YWCA. The McGraws had one son, Dr. Arthur Butler McGraw. They eventually moved to a house in Indian Village. The senior Arthur McGraw retired in his 50s, and suffered a nervous breakdown in 1922. The next year, on a trip to New York City for treatment, he jumped from a railroad bridge to his death.

In 1925, the younger McGraw built a house in Grosse Pointe at 340 Lakeland Street. Grace Ingersoll McGraw soon acquired property nearby, and in 1926/27 hired architect Charles A. Platt to design this house. Platt contracted local architect J. Philip McDonnell to supervise construction. Mrs. McGraw lived in the house until 1950, after which it was purchased by. Dr. and Mrs. Charles Merkel. Mrs. Merkel, the granddaughter of John S. Gray (the first president of the Ford Motor Company), lived in the house until her death in 1982.

== Description ==
The McGraw House is a three-story Georgian Revival structure constructed of Flemish brick and has a hipped slate roof. The house is composed of two sections: a sixty-nine feet wide by thirty-three feet deep main block, and a slightly smaller offset servant's wing. The main block is seven bays wide, with a center entrance sheltered by a small roof supported by bracketry. The entrance is flanked by three eight-over-twelve double-hung windows on each side. Matching windows are above, and the roof contains three dormers with pedimented fronts.

The interior of the house contains 7,113 sq ft. The main floor contains a large central hall loggia, a living room, and a large dining room, as well as a kitchen, servant's dining room, servant's porch and a laundry room. The second floor contains a sitting room, five bedrooms, four bathrooms, and three additional bedrooms for servants. The third floor contains a large playroom with a stage. There is also an apartment above the garage.
