= Outline of Henry Ford =

American business magnate (1863–1947)

The following outline is provided as an overview of and topical guide to Henry Ford:

Henry Ford – American captain of industry and a business magnate, the founder of the Ford Motor Company, and the sponsor of the development of the assembly line technique of mass production.

== Family of Henry Ford ==
- William Ford
- Edsel Ford
- Henry Ford II

== Companies of Henry Ford ==
- Cadillac Automobile Company
- Detroit Automobile Company
- Ford Motor Company
- Kingsford Company
- Stout Metal Airplane Division of the Ford Motor Company
- Universal Credit Corporation

== Inventions and designs of Henry Ford ==
- Ford Model T
- Ford Model A
- Ford Trimotor
- Ford Quadricycle

== Influence and ideas of Henry Ford ==
- Assembly line
- Fordism
- History of the automobile

== The Dearborn Independent ==
- The Dearborn Independent
- The Protocols of the Elders of Zion
- The International Jew

== Legacy ==
- Fair Lane
- Ford Foundation
- The Henry Ford
- Car Entrepreneur of the Century

== Miscellany ==
- The American Axis: Henry Ford, Charles Lindbergh and the Rise of the Third Reich
