= Ford Model B =

Ford Model B may refer to:

- Ford Model B (1904)
- Ford Model B (1932)
