= John S. Gray (businessman) =

American businessman

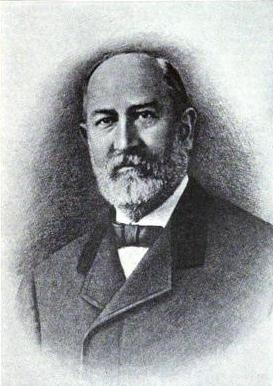

President of the Ford Motor Company
- In office 18 June 1903 – 6 July 1906
- Preceded by: Inaugural holder
- Succeeded by: Henry Ford

Personal details
- Born: John Simpson Gray; October 5, 1841 Edinburgh, Scotland
- Died: July 6, 1906 (aged 64) Detroit, Michigan, U.S.
- Spouse: Anna E. Hayward
- Occupation: Candymaker, banker

John Simpson Gray (October 5, 1841 – July 6, 1906) was a candymaker, business man, and banker from Detroit. He was also an original investor in and the first president of the Ford Motor Company.

== Early life ==
John S. Gray was born in Edinburgh, Scotland, on October 5, 1841, the son of Philip C. and Amelia Gray. In 1849, the family emigrated to the United States and settled on a farm in Wisconsin. However, Gray's father decided farming was not a suitable profession, and in 1857 the family moved to Detroit.

Gray attended high school in Detroit in 1857 and 1858, then took a job as a school teacher in Algonac, Michigan, over the winter of 1858-59. While Gray was engaged teaching school, his father bought a toy store in Detroit. Gray entered his father's business when he returned to Detroit in 1859. In 1861, the father and son sold the store and entered into a partnership with C. Pelgrim to manufacture candy, styling the firm name Pelgrim, Gray & Company. The company grew steadily, despite suffering a disastrous fire in 1862.

Gray married Anna E. Hayward of Beloit, Wisconsin on October 31, 1864. The couple had four children: Philip H. Gray, Paul R. Gray, David Gray, and Alice Gray.

Soon both Pelgrim and the elder Gray retired from Pelgrim, Gray & Co., and the firm took on a new partner, Joseph Toynton. In 1865 the name was changed to Gray & Toynton. The business grew rapidly, forcing moves to ever-larger quarters. In 1870, J. B. Fox joined as a partner> At this point the candy business was renamed Gray, Toynton & Fox, and the firm continued growing until both Toynton and Fox died in 1881.

== Gray, Toynton & Fox, and other business ==
With the passing of his partners, Gray incorporated the firm (but kept the name), and by 1891 Gray, Toynton & Fox was located in a five-story building, employing 150 people year round (and up to 200 people during the peak season) and producing $400,000 ($14.3 million in 2025) of candy per year with nationwide distribution.

With this wealth, Gray widened his business interests. He went into the lumber business with Orin W. Grover, incorporating as "Grover and Gray," doing business in Cheboygan, Michigan, and Detroit. He was also a director of the Detroit Trust Company, the Detroit Photographic Company, and the Norris Kollar & Kuff Company, and was the president of the Detroit Library Commission. In 1894, Gray became president of the German American Bank.

Gray eventually sold Gray, Toynton & Fox to the National Candy Company in 1903. He became a vice-president of the larger company.

== Ford Motor Company ==
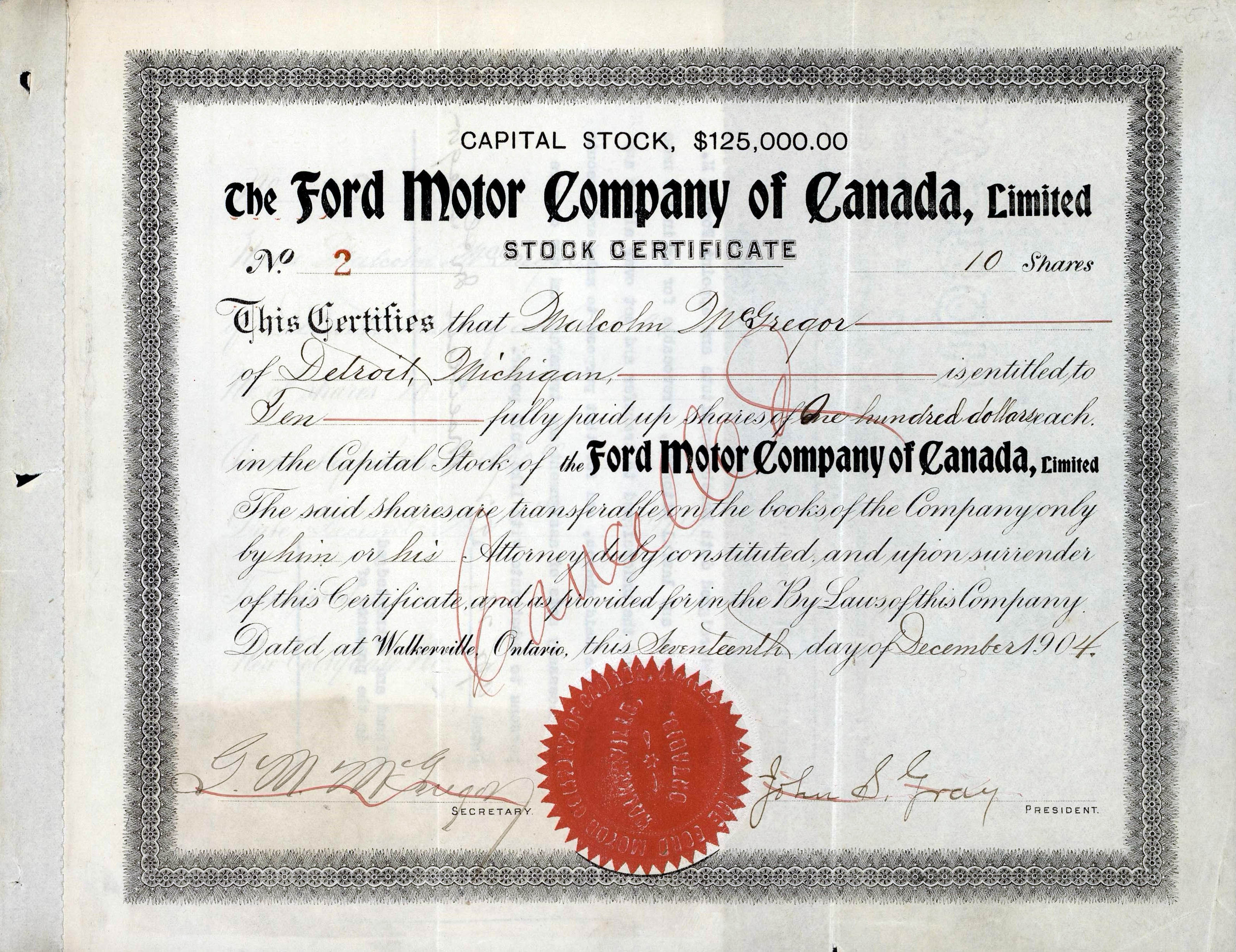
Stock certificate of the Ford Motor Company of Canada, Ltd., issued 17 December 1904, signed by President John S. Gray

In February 1903, John S. Gray was approached by his nephew Alexander Y. Malcomson, a frequent financing customer at Gray's German-American Savings Bank. Malcomson was a coal dealer, but had set up a separate partnership, Ford and Malcomson, with Henry Ford to manufacture an automobile. However, Ford and Malcomson had absorbed more money than expected, and the manufacturing firm of John and Horace Dodge, who had made parts for Ford and Malcomson, was demanding payment. Malcomson proposed incorporating the company to bring in new investors, and wanted Gray to join the company, thinking that Gray's name would attract others to invest.

Gray was at first disinclined to accommodate Malcomson, but Malcomson promised he could withdraw his share at any time, so Gray reluctantly agreed to invest $10,500 in return for a 10.5% stake in the company. On the strength of Gray's name, Malcomson attracted enough other investors to bankroll the new company, even convincing the Dodges to accept stock in lieu of payment. On June 16, 1903, the Ford Motor Company was incorporated, with 12 investors owning a total of 1,000 shares valued at $100,000. At the first meeting of stockholders, Gray was elected president, Henry Ford vice-president, and James Couzens secretary.

Despite Gray's misgivings, Ford Motor Company was immediately profitable, with profits by October 1, 1903 of almost $37,000. The company paid a dividend of 10% that October, an additional dividend of 20% at the beginning of 1904, and another dividend of 68% in June 1904. Two dividends of 100% each in June and July 1905 brought the total investor profits to nearly 300% of the initial investment in just over two years; 1905 total profits were almost $300,000.

However, despite the booming business, there were internal frictions in the company of which Gray nominally was in charge. Most of the investors, Malcomson and Gray included, had their own businesses to attend to; only Ford and Couzens worked full-time at the company, and Ford chafed at the status quo. The issue came to a head when the principal stockholders, Ford and Malcomson, quarreled over the future direction of the company. Gray sided with Ford, and by early 1906 Malcomson was effectively frozen out of the Ford Motor Company (and, indeed, had started his own competing auto company, AeroCar). In May, Malcomson sold his shares to Henry Ford, leaving the Ford Motor Company vice-president as majority stockholder.

== Death and estate ==
Gray was still president of Ford Motor Company when Malcomson sold his shares. However, on July 6, 1906, John S. Gray died unexpectedly of heart trouble. Gray's position as Ford president was taken over by Henry Ford himself soon afterward. Gray's estate, however, retained control of his shares in the company, until Henry Ford bought them in 1919. For the 16 years that Gray and his heirs owned their stake in the company, they received total dividends of $10,355,075. When the estate finally sold his shares to Henry Ford, the price was $26,250,000, making a total return of $36,605,075 on Gray's $10,500 initial investment.

Business positions
| Preceded by none (inaugural holder) | President of Ford Motor Company; 18 June 1903 - 6 July 1906 | Succeeded by Henry Ford |
