= Universal Credit Corporation =

The Universal Credit Corporation (UCC) was a car financing entity for Ford cars that existed in the US in the 1930s. It was established in 1928 and was capitalised by Ford in conjunction with the Union Guardian Trust Company of Detroit. It was set up in response to GMAC (now Ally Financial) through the efforts of Edsel Ford and Ernest Kanzler at Ford to allow customers to buy Ford cars on credit. In 1932, Henry Ford sold the corporation for $US 50 million in order to finance his manufacturing operations during the 1932 Bank Moratorium. Ford's share of the company was sold to Commercial Investment Trust (CIT) Corporation and UCC continued to serve Ford dealers and customers.
