= Ford Model B (1904) =

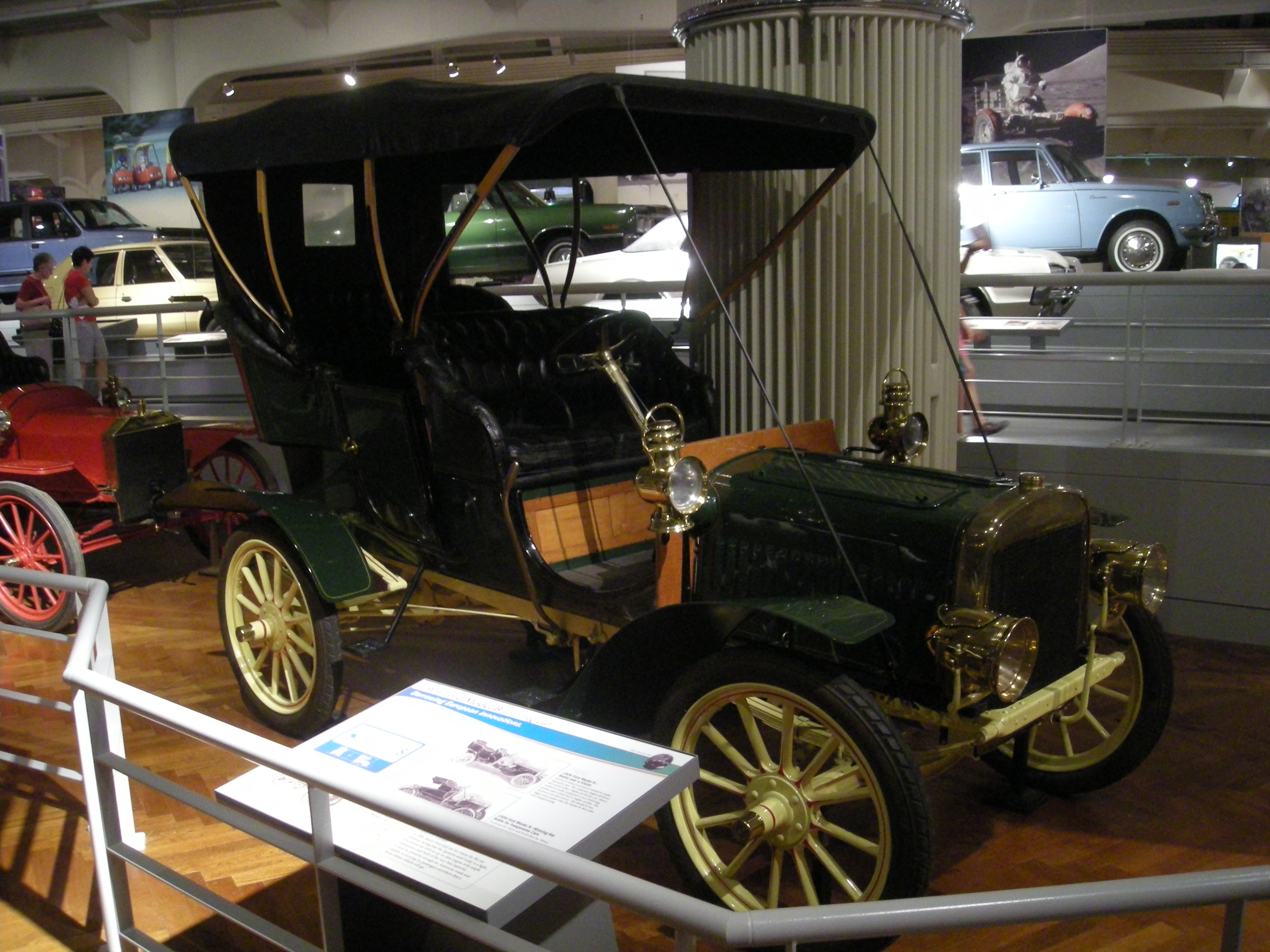

Overview
- Manufacturer: Ford
- Production: 1904–1906
- Designer: Henry Ford

Body and chassis
- Class: Upscale
- Body style: 2-row 4-passenger touring car
- Related: Cadillac 8 1/2

Powertrain
- Engine: 283.5CID 24hp Straight-4
- Transmission: 2-speed planetary

Dimensions
- Wheelbase: 92 in (2337 mm)
- Curb weight: 1700lbs.

Chronology
- Predecessor: Ford Model A
- Successor: Ford Model K

The Ford Model B is an upscale touring car (with polished wood and brass trim) that was introduced in 1904 by Ford, built at the Ford Piquette Avenue Plant. It was Ford's first car to use the front-engine layout, with a large 24 hp 4-cylinder engine positioned at the front behind a conventional radiator. The smaller Model A-derived Model C positioned its flat 2-cylinder motor under the seat.

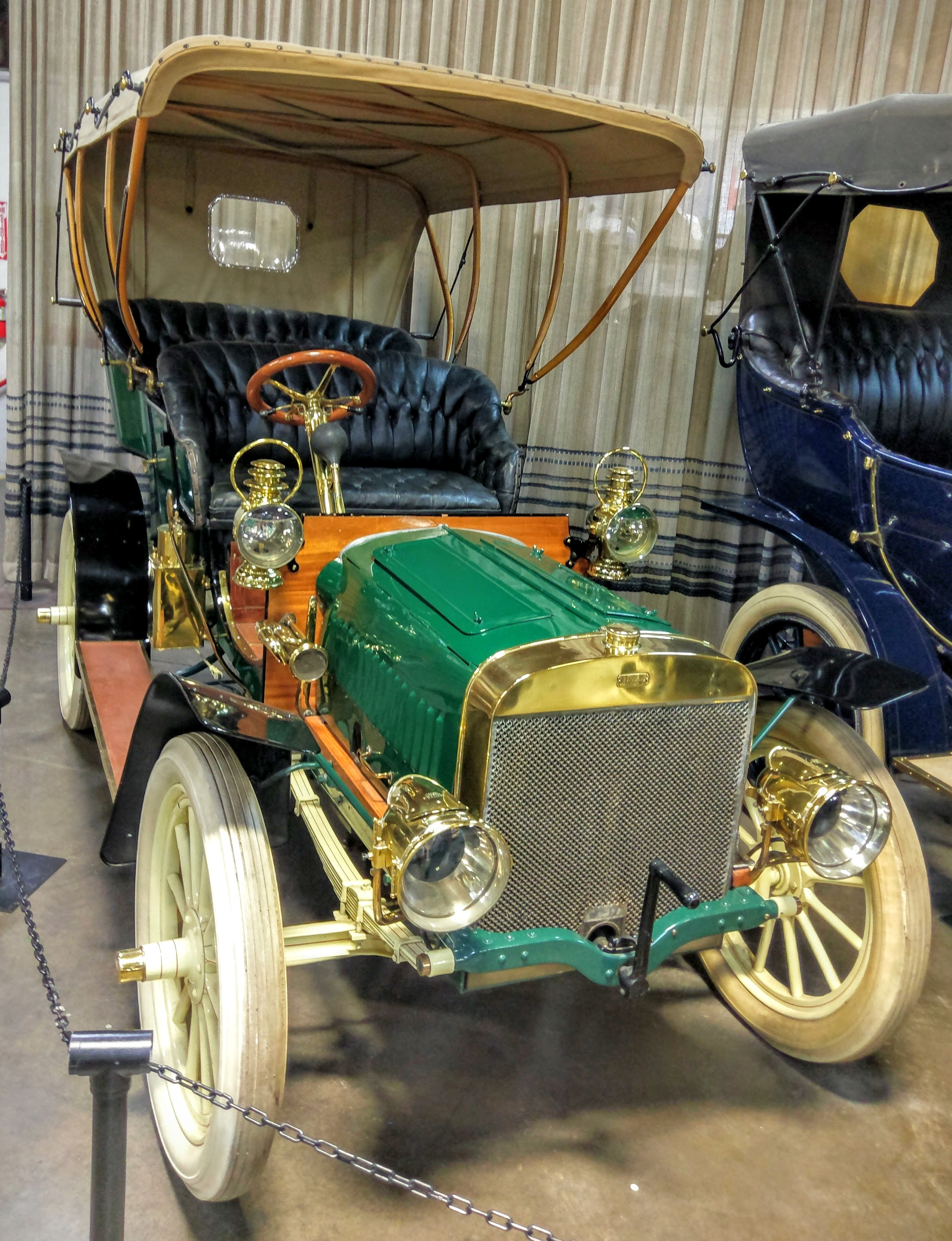
1904 Ford Model B Touring

Priced at $2,000 (equivalent to $72,000 today), the Model B was a high-end car. Produced for three years, sales were predictably slower than the Model C at one-third of the price. The Model B was replaced by the derivative Model K in 1906.

== See also ==
- Ford Model B (1932)
