= Ford Model K =

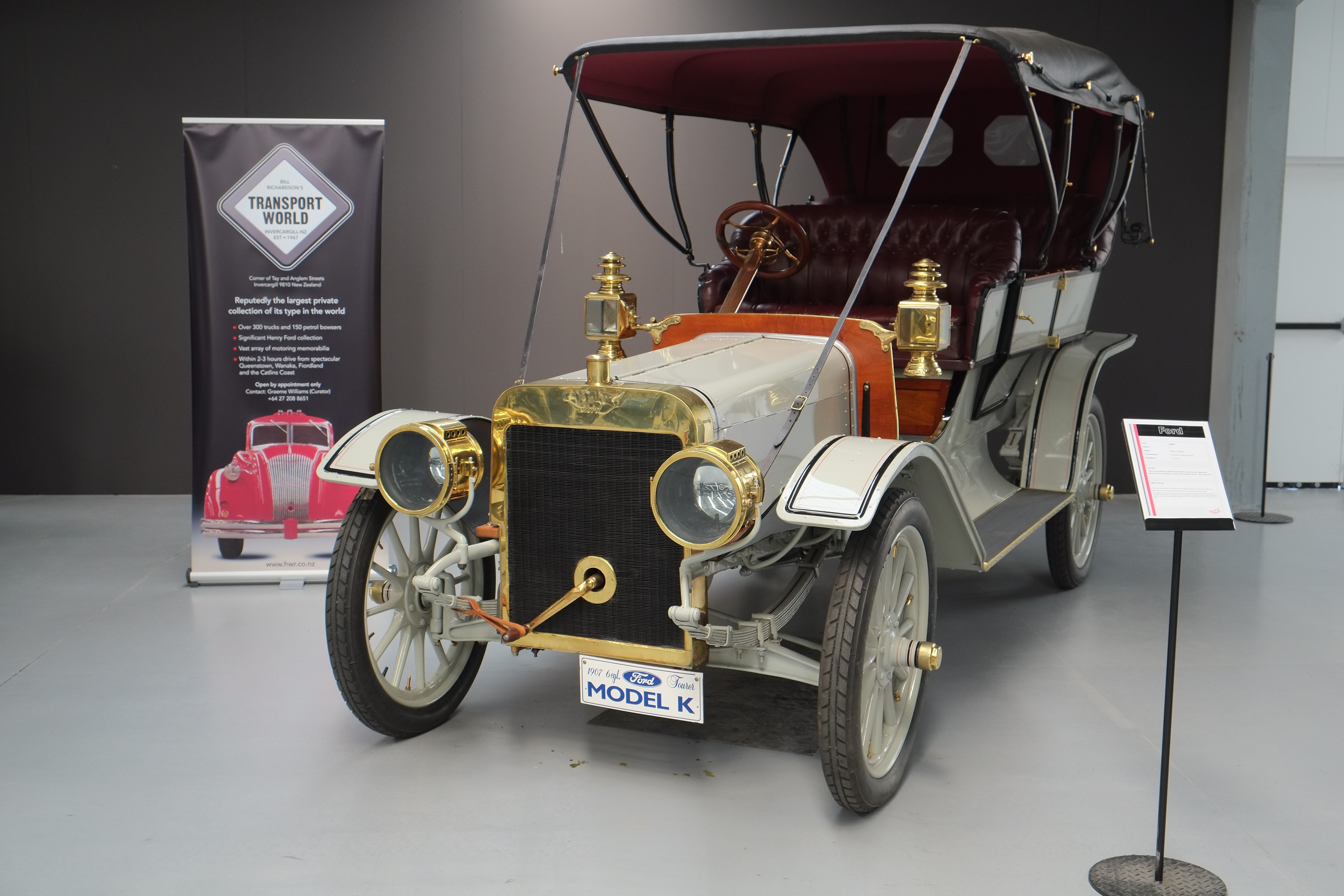

Overview
- Manufacturer: Ford
- Production: 1906–1908
- Designer: Henry Ford

Body and chassis
- Class: Upscale
- Body style: 2-row touring car
- Related: Ford Model N

Powertrain
- Engine: 405CID cast iron block 40hp Straight-6
- Transmission: planetary 2-speed manual

Dimensions
- Wheelbase: 114 in (290 cm)
- Curb weight: 2,400 lb (1,089 kg)

Chronology
- Predecessor: Ford Model B
- Successor: Ford Model T

The Ford Model K is an upscale automobile that was produced by Ford Motor Company. Introduced in 1906, the “K” replaced the earlier Model B. It was built at the Ford Piquette Avenue Plant. The Model K was aimed at the top end of the market and featured an inline-6 (the only Ford six until 1941) giving 40 hp (30 kW). In typical Ford fashion, the Model K was the lowest priced six cylinder car, with among the best horsepower to weight ratio in its class. The wheelbase for 1906 was 114 in (2,896 mm). For 1907 and 08, the Model was significantly improved with a longer wheelbase (120 inch), 20% more h.p., and stronger frame. It was also offered in both touring and runabout bodies.

Contrary to popular folklore, the Model K was a good seller for Ford Motor Company. In 1906, the first year it was offered, the Model K produced over 85 percent of Ford Motor Company's new car profit (1906 Ford Motor Company internal audit records).

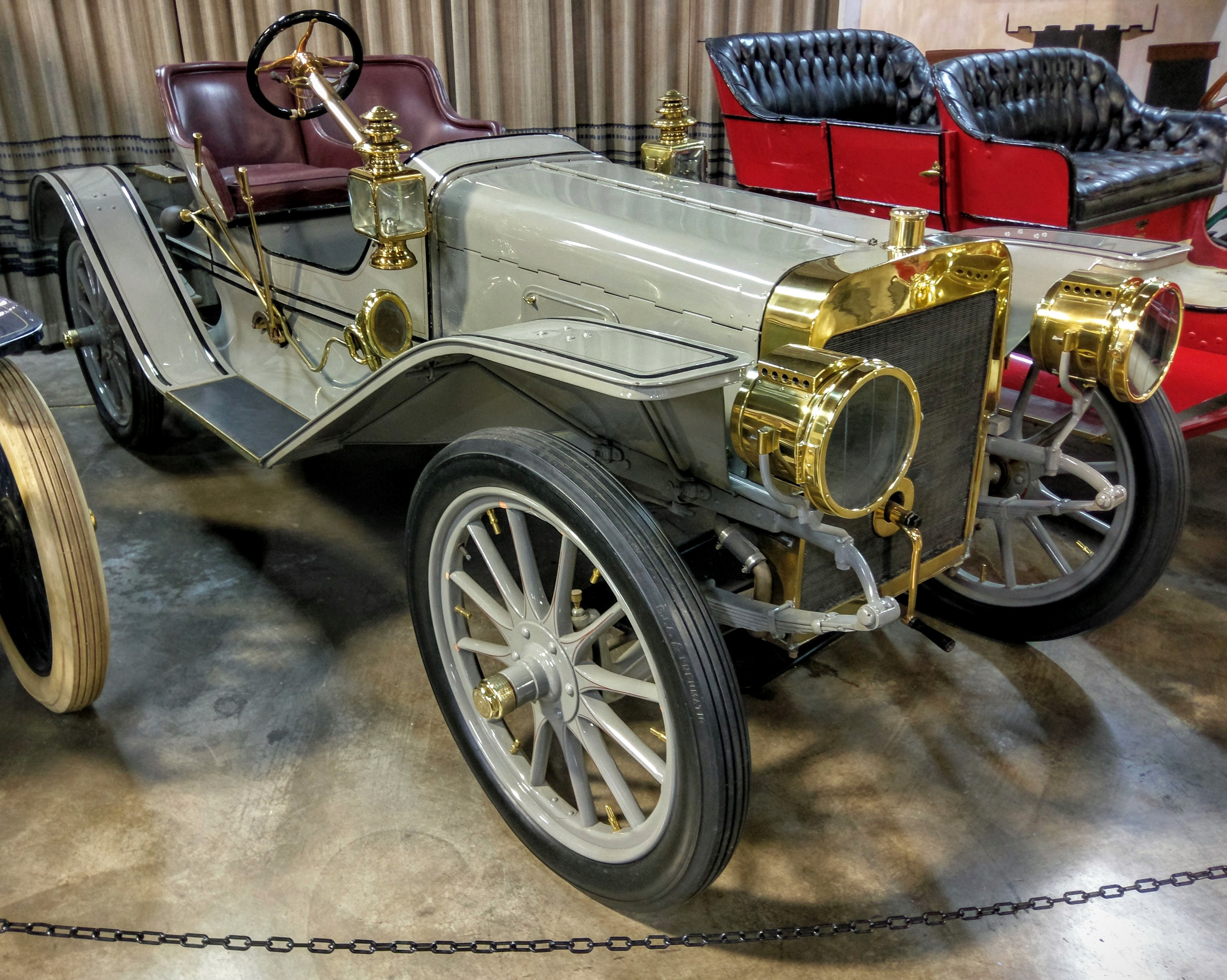
1907 Ford Model K 6-40 Roadster

In 1907, the second sales year of the Model K, almost 500 examples were sold, making it the best-selling six-cylinder model in the world.

As period journals reported, Ford Motor Company went in another direction, moving to one chassis, a mid-priced car, the Model T, leaving the multi-line business model used by most auto makers of the period. However, sales and profits from the Model K helped Ford Motor Company become the largest automaker in number of sales in 1907, and along with the Model N, was the only Ford model sold through three model years (1906–1908) prior to the advent of the Model T.
