= Henry Ford =

American business magnate (1863–1947)

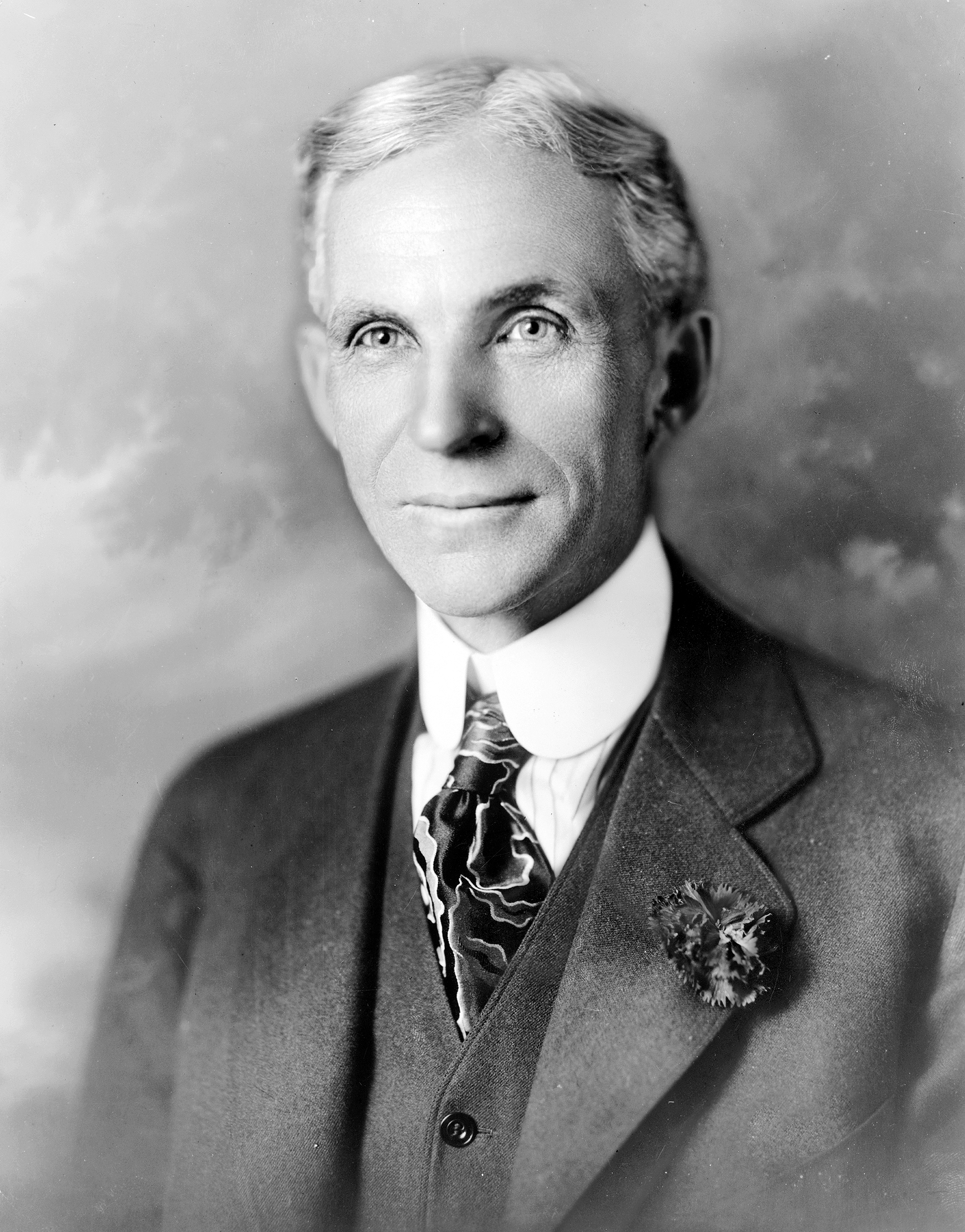
- Ford in 1919
- Born: July 30, 1863; Springwells Township, Michigan, U.S.
- Died: April 7, 1947 (aged 83); Dearborn, Michigan, U.S.
- Resting place: Ford Cemetery, Detroit, Michigan
- Other name: Henry Ford I
- Occupations: Engineer; industrialist; publisher; philanthropist
- Years active: 1891–1945
- Known for: Founding and leading the Ford Motor Company; Pioneering a system that launched the mass production and sale of affordable automobiles to the public
- Title: President of the Ford Motor Company (1906–1919, 1943–1945)
- Political party: Republican (1881–1918); Democratic (1918–1947)
- Spouse: Clara Jane Bryant (m. 1888)
- Children: Edsel
- Family: Ford
- Awards: Elliott Cresson Medal (1928)

Henry Ford (July 30, 1863 – April 7, 1947) was an American industrialist and engineer. As the founder of the Ford Motor Company, he is credited as a pioneer in making automobiles affordable for middle-class Americans through the system that came to be known as Fordism. In 1911, he was awarded a patent for the transmission mechanism that would be used in the Ford Model T and other automobiles.

Ford was born in a farmhouse in Greenfield Township, Michigan, and left home at the age of 16 to find work in Detroit. It was a few years before this time that Ford first experienced automobiles, and throughout the later half of the 1880s, he began repairing and later constructing engines, and through the 1890s worked with a division of Edison Electric. He founded the Ford Motor Company in 1903 after prior failures in business, but was successful in constructing automobiles.

The introduction of the Ford Model T vehicle in 1908 is credited with having revolutionized both transportation and American industry. As the sole owner of the Ford Motor Company, Ford became one of the wealthiest people in the world. He was also among the pioneers of the five-day work-week. Ford believed that consumerism could help to bring about world peace. His commitment to systematically lowering costs resulted in many technical and business innovations, including a franchise system, which allowed for car dealerships throughout North America and in major cities on six continents.

Ford was known for his pacifism during the first years of World War I, although during the war his company became a major supplier of weapons. He promoted the League of Nations. In the 1920s, Ford promoted antisemitism through his newspaper The Dearborn Independent and the book The International Jew. He opposed his country's entry into World War II, and served for a time on the board of the America First Committee. After his son Edsel died in 1943, Ford resumed control of the company, but was too frail to make decisions and quickly came under the control of several of his subordinates. He turned over the company to his grandson Henry Ford II in 1945. Upon his death in 1947, he left most of his wealth to the Ford Foundation and control of the company to his family.

== Early life ==
Henry Ford was born July 30, 1863, on a farm in Greenfield Township, Michigan. The house he was born in stood at the intersection of Ford and Greenfield Roads in present-day Dearborn. His father, William Ford (1826–1905), was born in County Cork, Ireland, to a family that had emigrated from Somerset, England in the 16th century. His mother, Mary Ford (née Litogot; 1839–1876), was born in Michigan as the youngest child of Belgian immigrants; her parents died when she was a child and she was adopted by neighbors, the O'Herns. Henry Ford's siblings were John Ford (1865–1927), Margaret Ford Ruddiman (1867–1960), Jane Ford (1869–1906), William Ford (1871–1959), and Robert Ford (1873–1877). Ford finished eighth grade at a one-room school, Springwells Middle School. He never attended high school; he later took a bookkeeping course at a commercial school.

His father gave him a pocket watch when he was 12. At 15, Ford dismantled and reassembled the timepieces of friends and neighbors dozens of times, gaining the reputation of a watch repairman. At twenty, Ford walked four miles to their Episcopal church every Sunday.

Ford said two significant events occurred in 1875 when he was 12: he received the watch, and he witnessed the operation of a Nichols and Shepard road engine, "...the first automobile other than horse-drawn that I had ever seen".

Ford was devastated when his mother died in 1876. His father expected him to take over the family farm eventually, but he despised farm work. He later wrote, "I never had any particular love for the farm—it was the mother on the farm I loved."

In 1879, Ford left home to work as an apprentice machinist in Detroit, first with James F. Flower & Brothers, and later with the Detroit Dry Dock Company. In 1882, he returned to Dearborn to work on the family farm, where he became adept at operating the Westinghouse portable steam engine. He was later hired by Westinghouse to service their steam engines.

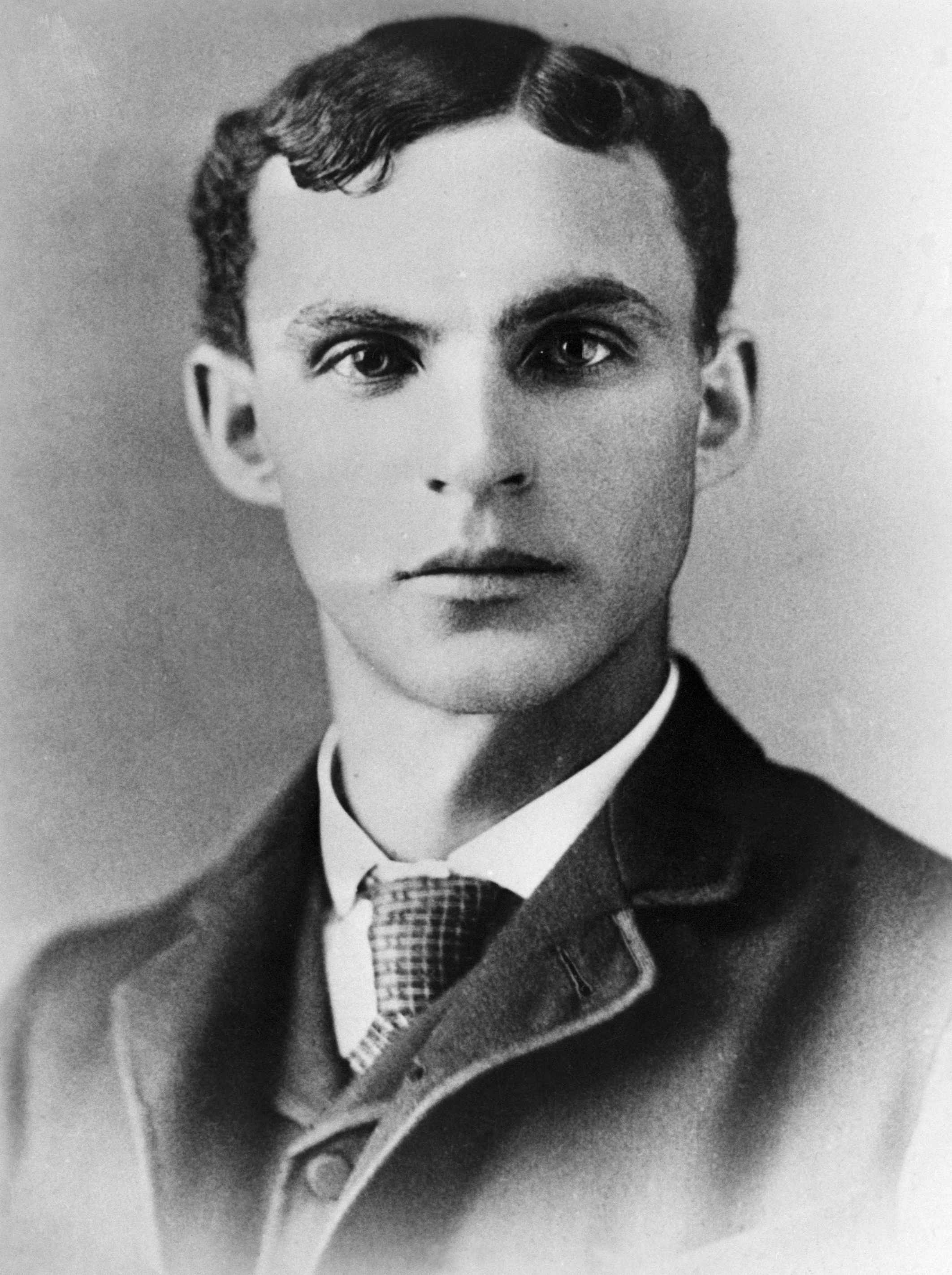
Henry Ford in 1888 (aged 25)

In his farm workshop, Ford built a "steam wagon or tractor" and a steam car, but thought "steam was not suitable for light automobiles," as "the boiler was dangerous." Ford also said that he "did not see the use of experimenting with electricity, due to the expense of trolley wires, and "no storage battery was in sight of a weight that was practical." In 1885, Ford repaired an Otto engine, and in 1887, he built a four-cycle model with a one-inch bore and a three-inch stroke. In 1890, Ford started work on a two-cylinder engine.

Ford said, "In 1892, I completed my first motor car, powered by a two-cylinder four horsepower motor, with a two-and-half-inch bore and a six-inch stroke, which was connected to a countershaft by a belt and then to the rear wheel by a chain. The belt was shifted by a clutch lever to control speeds at 10 or 20 miles per hour, augmented by a throttle. Other features included 28-inch wire bicycle wheels with rubber tires, a foot brake, a 3-gallon gasoline tank, and later, a water jacket around the cylinders for cooling. Ford added that "in the spring of 1893 the machine was running to my partial satisfaction and giving an opportunity further to test out the design and material on the road." Between 1895 and 1896, Ford drove that machine about 1000 miles. He then started a second car in 1896, eventually building three of them in his home workshop.

== Marriage and family ==
Ford married Clara Jane Bryant (1866–1950) on April 11, 1888, and supported himself by farming and running a sawmill. They had one child, Edsel Ford (1893–1943).

== Career ==
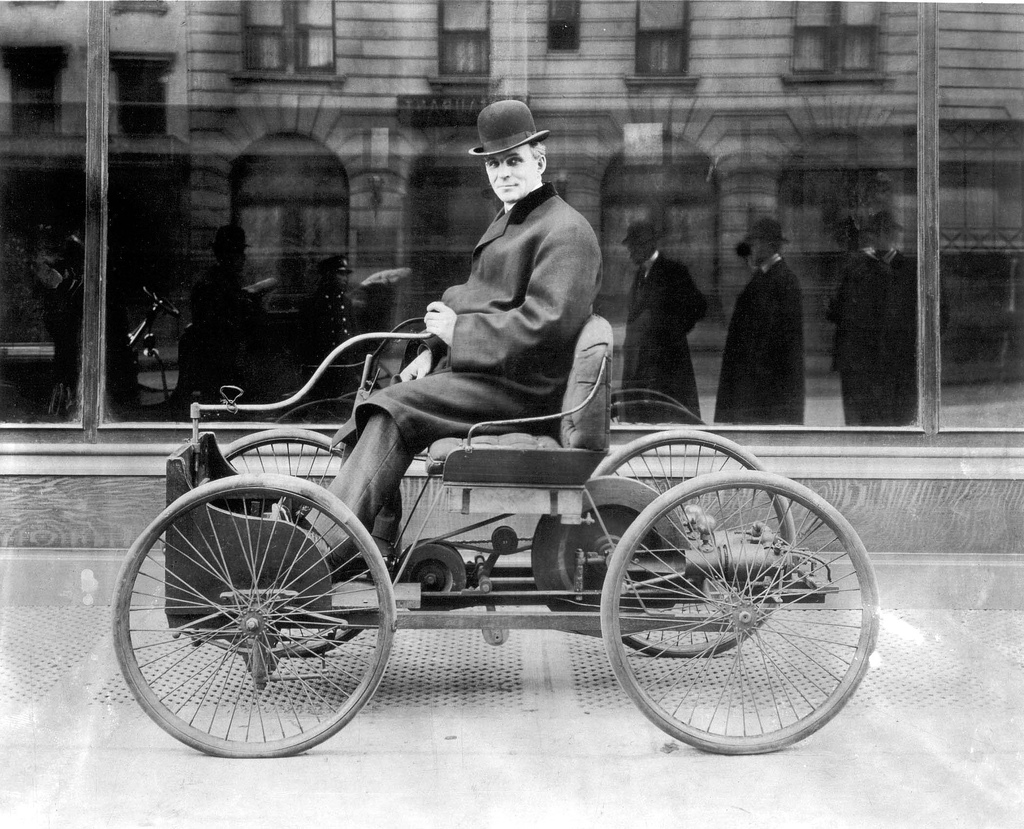
Henry Ford sits in his first automobile, the Quadricycle, in 1896.

In 1891, Ford became an engineer with the Edison Illuminating Company of Detroit. After his promotion to Chief Engineer in 1893, he had enough time and money to devote attention to his experiments on gasoline engines. These experiments culminated in 1896 with the completion of a self-propelled automobile, which he named the Ford Quadricycle. He test-drove it on June 4. After various test drives, Ford brainstormed ways to improve the Quadricycle.

Also in 1896, Ford attended a meeting of Edison executives, where he was introduced to Thomas Edison. Edison approved of Ford's automobile experimentation. Encouraged by Edison, Ford designed and built a second automobile, completing it in 1898. Backed by the capital of Detroit lumber baron William H. Murphy, Ford resigned from the Edison Company and founded the Detroit Automobile Company on August 5, 1899. However, the automobiles produced were of a lower quality and higher price than Ford wanted. Ultimately, the company was not successful and was dissolved in January of 1901.

With the help of C. Harold Wills, Ford designed, built, and successfully raced a 26-horsepower automobile in October 1901. With this success, Murphy and other stockholders in the Detroit Automobile Company formed the Henry Ford Company on November 30, 1901, with Ford as chief engineer. In 1902, Murphy brought in Henry M. Leland as a consultant; Ford, in response, left the company bearing his name. With Ford gone, Leland renamed the company the Cadillac Automobile Company.

Teaming up with former racing cyclist Tom Cooper, Ford also produced the 80+ horsepower racer "999", which Barney Oldfield was to drive to victory in a race in October 1902. Ford received the backing of an old acquaintance, Alexander Y. Malcomson, a Detroit-area coal dealer. They formed a partnership, Ford & Malcomson, Limited, to manufacture automobiles. Ford went to work designing inexpensive automobiles, and the duo leased a factory and contracted with a machine shop owned by John and Horace E. Dodge to supply over $160,000 in parts. Sales were slow, and a crisis arose when the Dodge brothers demanded payment for their first shipment.

=== Ford Motor Company ===
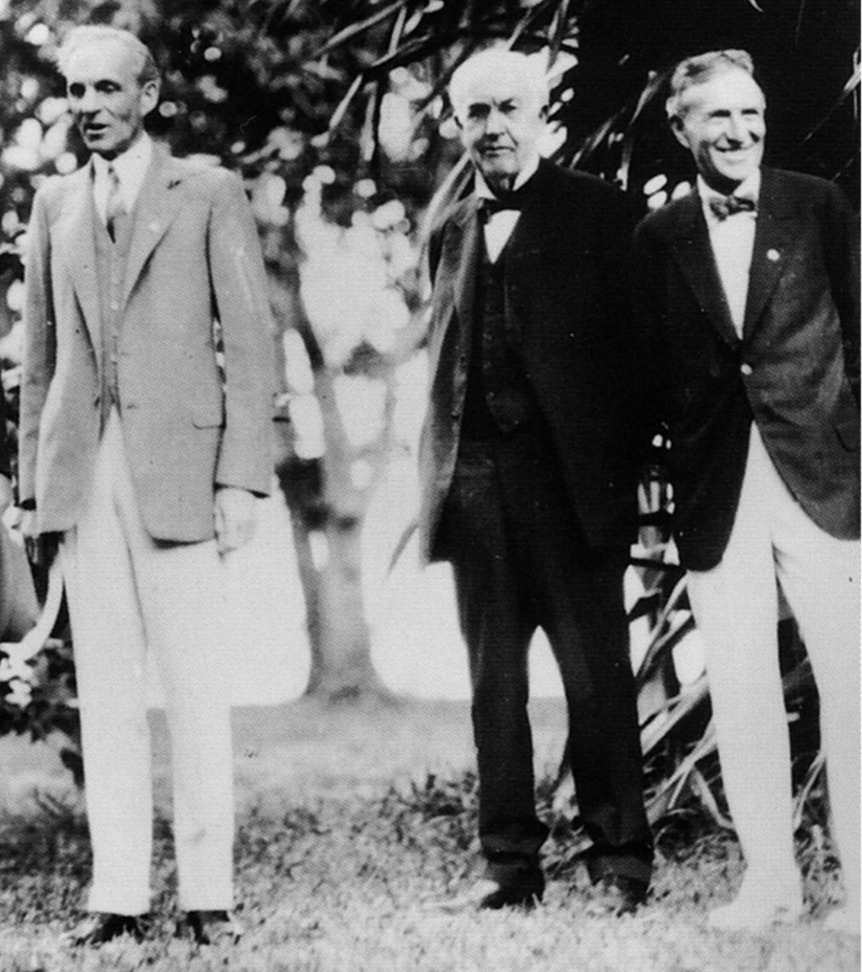
Henry Ford with Thomas Edison and Harvey S. Firestone. Fort Myers, Florida, February 11, 1929.

In response, Malcomson brought in another group of investors and convinced the Dodge brothers to accept a portion of the new company. Ford & Malcomson was reincorporated as the Ford Motor Company on June 16, 1903, with $28,000 capital. The original investors included Ford and Malcomson, the Dodge brothers, Malcomson's uncle John S. Gray, Malcolmson's secretary James Couzens, and two of Malcomson's lawyers, John W. Anderson and Horace Rackham. Because of Ford's volatility, Gray was elected president of the company. Ford then demonstrated a newly designed car on the ice of Lake St. Clair, driving 1 mile (1.6 km) in 39.4 seconds and setting a new land speed record at 91.3 miles per hour (146.9 kilometres per hour). Convinced by this success, race driver Barney Oldfield, who named this new Ford model "999" in honor of the fastest locomotive of the day, took the car around the country, making the Ford brand known throughout the United States. Ford was also one of the early backers of the Indianapolis 500.

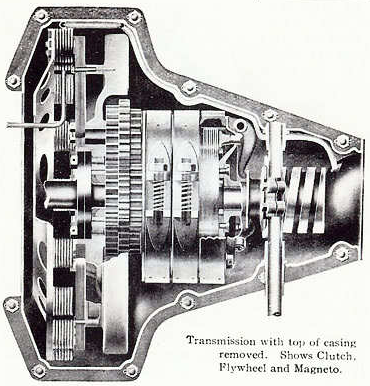
Ford's Transmission Mechanism (1909)

=== Transmission Patent ===
In 1909, Ford applied for a patent on his new transmission mechanism. It was awarded a patent in 1911.

==== Model T ====
The Model T debuted on October 1, 1908. It had the steering wheel on the left, which every other company soon copied. The entire engine and transmission were enclosed; the four cylinders were cast in a solid block; the suspension used two semi-elliptic springs. The car was simple to drive, easy and inexpensive to repair. It was so inexpensive at $825 in 1908 ($29,560 today), with the price falling every year, that by the 1920s, a majority of American drivers had learned to drive on the Model T.

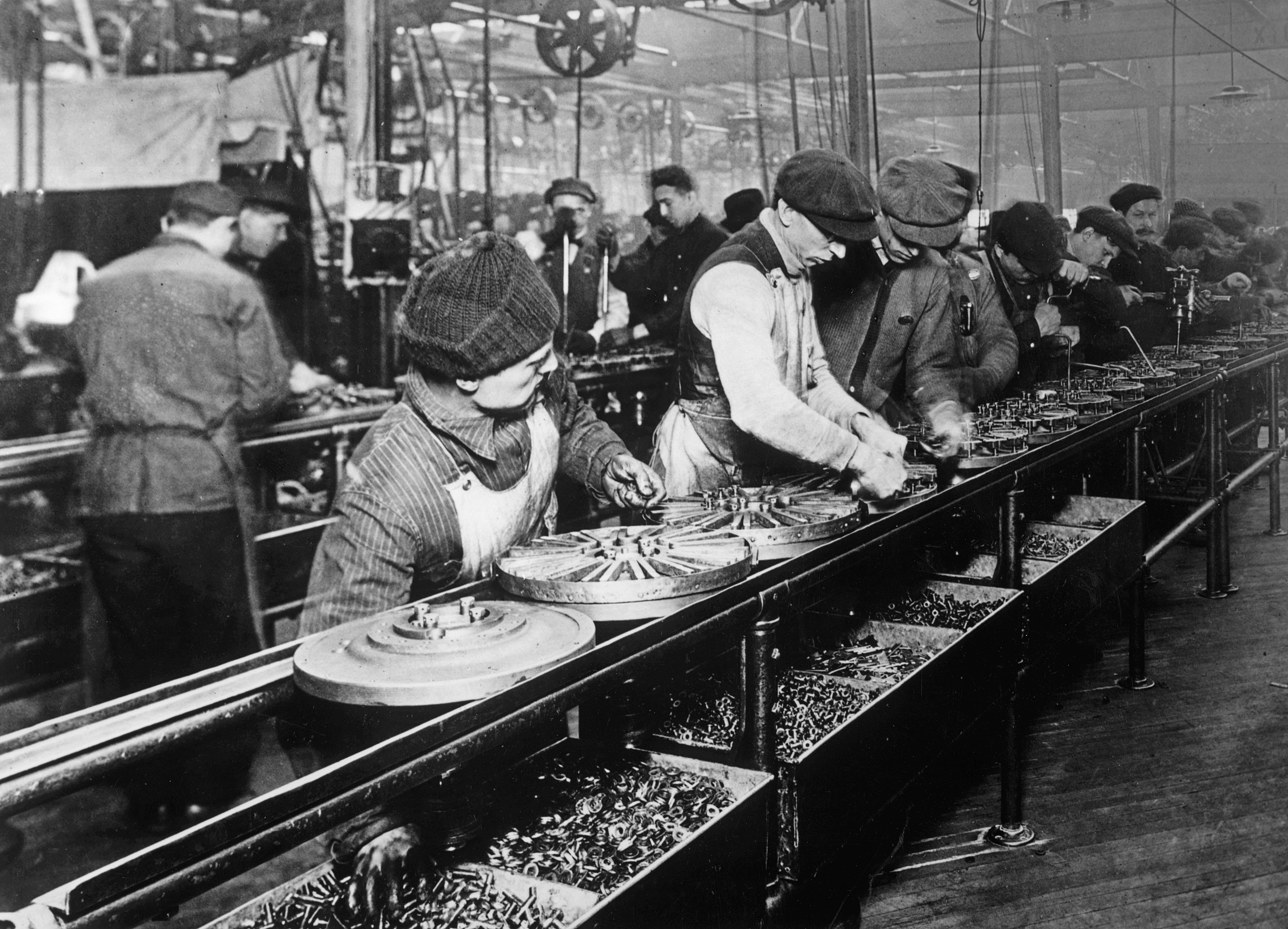
Ford assembly line, 1913

Ford created a huge publicity machine in Detroit to ensure every newspaper carried stories and ads about the new product. Ford's network of local dealers made the car ubiquitous in almost every city in North America. As independent dealers, the franchises grew rich and publicized not just the Ford but also the concept of car local motor clubs sprang up to help new drivers and encourage them to explore the countryside. Ford was always eager to sell to farmers, who looked at the automobile as a commercial device to help their business. Sales skyrocketed—several years posted 100% gains on the previous year. In 1913, Ford introduced moving assembly belts into his plants, which enabled an enormous increase in production. Although Ford is often credited with the idea, contemporary sources indicate that the concept and development came from employees Clarence Avery, Peter E. Martin, Charles E. Sorensen, and C. Harold Wills. (See Ford Piquette Avenue Plant.)

Sales passed 250,000 in 1914. By 1916, as the price dropped to $360 for the basic touring car, sales reached 472,000.

By 1918, half of all cars in the United States were Model Ts. All new cars were black; as Ford wrote in his autobiography, "Any customer can have a car painted any color that he wants so long as it is black." Until the development of the assembly line, which mandated black because of its quicker drying time, Model Ts were available in other colors, including red. The design was fervently promoted and defended by Ford, and production continued as late as 1927; the final total production was 15,007,034. This record stood for the next 45 years, and was achieved in 19 years from the introduction of the first Model T (1908).

Henry Ford turned the presidency of Ford Motor Company over to his son Edsel Ford in December 1918. Henry retained final decision authority and sometimes reversed the decisions of his son. Ford started another company, Henry Ford and Son, and made a show of taking himself and his best employees to the new company; the goal was to scare the remaining holdout stockholders of the Ford Motor Company into selling their stakes to him before they lost most of their value. (He was determined to have full control over strategic decisions.) The ruse worked, and Henry and Edsel purchased all remaining stock from the other investors, thus giving the family sole ownership of the company.

In 1922, Ford also purchased Lincoln Motor Co., founded by Cadillac founder Henry Leland and his son Wilfred during World War I. The Lelands briefly stayed to manage the company, but were soon expelled from it. Despite this acquisition of a premium car maker, Henry displayed relatively little enthusiasm for luxury automobiles in contrast to Edsel, who actively sought to expand Ford into the upscale market. The original Lincoln Model L that the Lelands had introduced in 1920 was also kept in production, untouched for a decade until it became too outdated. It was replaced by the modernized Model K in 1931.

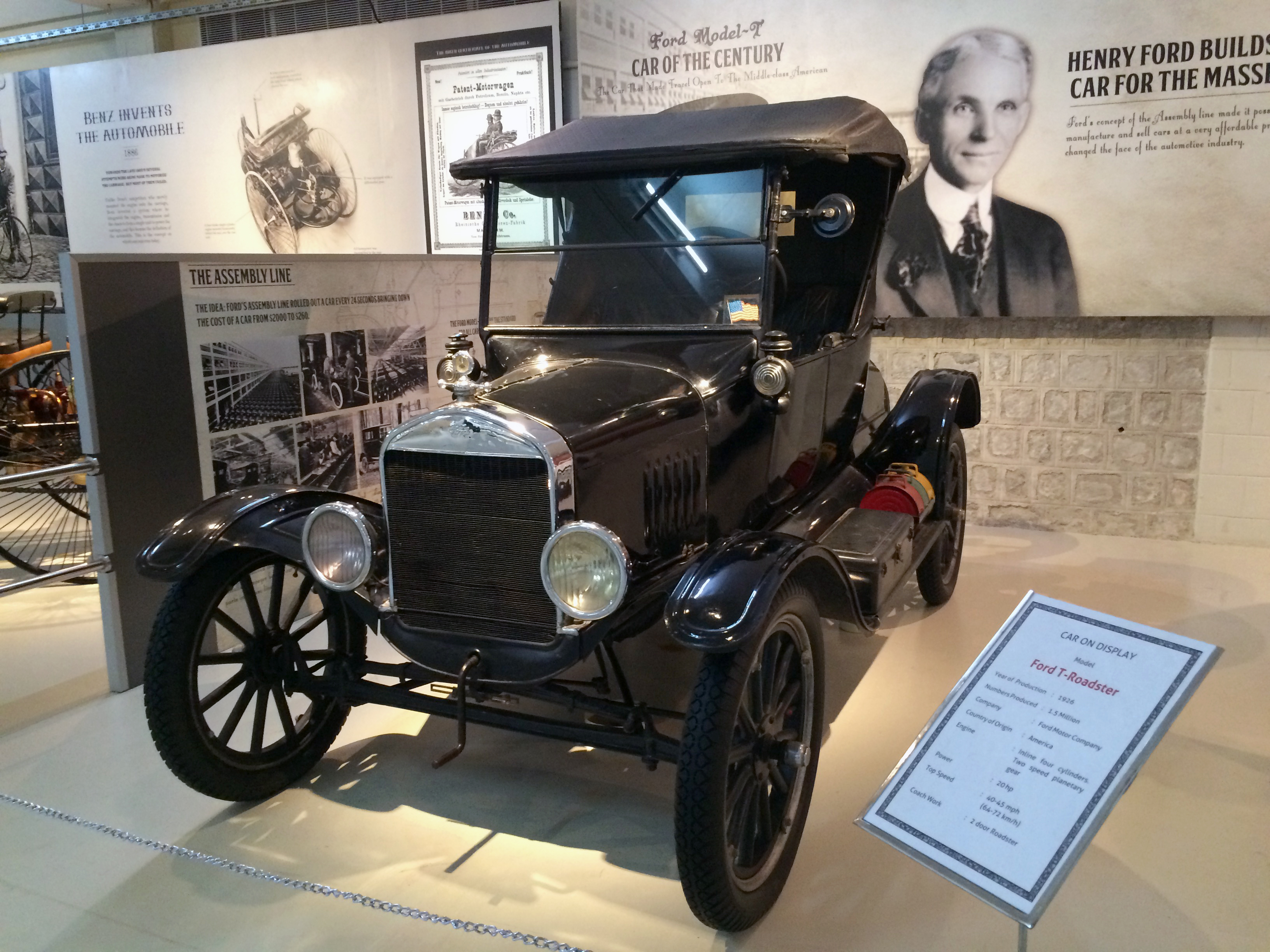
A 1926 Ford T Roadster on display in India

By the mid-1920s, General Motors was rapidly rising as the leading American vehicle manufacturer. GM president Alfred Sloan established the company's "price ladder" whereby GM would offer an automobile for "every purse and purpose", in contrast to Ford's lack of interest in anything outside the low-end market. Although Henry Ford was against replacing the Model T, now 16 years old, Chevrolet was mounting a bold new challenge as GM's entry-level division in the company's price ladder. Ford also resisted the increasingly popular idea of payment plans for cars. With Model T sales starting to slide, Ford was forced to relent and approve work on a successor model, shutting down production for 18 months. During this time, Ford constructed a massive new assembly plant at River Rouge for the new Model A, which launched in 1927.

In addition to its price ladder, GM also quickly established itself at the forefront of automotive styling under Harley Earl's Arts & Color Department, another area of automobile design that Henry Ford did not entirely appreciate or understand. Ford would not have a true equivalent of the GM styling department for many years.

==== Model A and Ford's later career ====
By 1926, flagging sales of the Model T finally convinced Ford to make a new model. He pursued the project with a great deal of interest in the design of the engine, chassis, and other mechanical necessities, while leaving the body design to his son. Although Ford fancied himself an engineering genius, he had little formal training in mechanical engineering and could not even read a blueprint. A talented team of engineers performed most of the actual work of designing the Model A (and later the flathead V8), with Ford supervising them closely and giving them overall direction. Edsel also managed to prevail over his father's initial objections in the inclusion of a sliding-shift transmission.

The result was the Ford Model A, introduced in December 1927 and produced through 1931, with a total output of more than four million. Subsequently, the Ford company adopted an annual model change system similar to that recently pioneered by its competitor General Motors (and still in use by automobiles today). Not until the 1930s did Ford overcome his objection to finance companies, and the Ford-owned Universal Credit Corporation became a major car-financing operation. Henry Ford still resisted many technological innovations, such as hydraulic brakes and all-metal roofs, which Ford automobiles did not adopt until 1935–1936. For 1932, however, Ford dropped a bombshell with the flathead Ford V8, the first low-price eight-cylinder engine. The flathead V8, variants of which were used in Ford automobiles for 20 years, was the result of a secret project launched in 1930, and Henry had initially considered a radical X-8 engine before agreeing to a conventional design. It gave Ford a reputation as a performance make well-suited for hot-rodding.

Also, at Edsel's insistence, Ford launched Mercury in 1939 as a mid-range make to challenge Dodge and Buick, although Henry also displayed relatively little enthusiasm for it.

==== Labor philosophy ====
===== Five-dollar wage =====
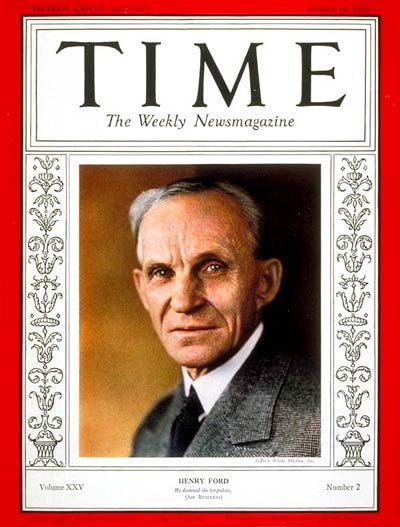
Time magazine cover, January 14, 1935

Ford was a pioneer of "welfare capitalism", designed to improve the lot of his workers and especially to reduce the heavy turnover that had many departments hiring 300 men per year to fill 100 slots. Efficiency meant hiring and keeping the best workers.

Ford astonished the world in 1914 by offering a $5 daily wage ($161 in 2025), which more than doubled the rate of most of his workers. A Cleveland, Ohio newspaper editorialized that the announcement "shot like a blinding rocket through the dark clouds of the present industrial depression". The move proved extremely profitable; instead of constant employee turnover, the best mechanics in Detroit flocked to Ford, bringing their human capital and expertise, raising productivity, and lowering training costs. Ford announced his $5-per-day program on January 5, 1914, raising the minimum daily pay from $2.34 to $5 for qualifying male workers.

Detroit was already a high-wage city, but competitors were forced to raise wages or lose their best workers. Ford's policy proved that paying employees more would enable them to afford the cars they were producing and thus boost the local economy. He viewed the increased wages as profit-sharing linked with rewarding those who were most productive and of good character. It may have been James Couzens who convinced Ford to adopt the $5-day wage.

Real profit-sharing was offered to employees who had worked at the company for six months or more, and, importantly, conducted their lives in a manner that Ford's "Social Department" approved. They frowned on heavy drinking, gambling, and on what are now called deadbeat dads. The Social Department used 50 investigators and support staff to maintain employee standards; a large percentage of workers were able to qualify for this "profit-sharing".

Ford's incursion into his employees' private lives was highly controversial, and he soon backed off from the most intrusive aspects. By the time he wrote his 1922 memoir, he spoke of the Social Department and the private conditions for profit-sharing in the past tense. He admitted that "paternalism has no place in the industry. Welfare work that consists of prying into employees' private concerns is out of date. Men need counsel and men need help, often special help; and all this ought to be rendered for decency's sake. But the broad workable plan of investment and participation will do more to solidify the industry and strengthen the organization than will any social work on the outside. Without changing the principle, we have changed the method of payment."

===== Five-day workweek =====
In addition to raising his workers' wages, Ford also introduced a new, reduced workweek in 1926. The decision was made in 1922, when Ford and Crowther described it as six 8-hour days, giving a 48-hour week, but in 1926 it was announced as five 8-hour days, giving a 40-hour week. The program apparently started with Saturday being designated a workday, before becoming a day off sometime later. On May 1, 1926, the Ford Motor Company's factory workers switched to a five-day, 40-hour workweek, with the company's office workers making the transition the following August.

Ford predicted a boost in productivity, as workers were expected to put more effort into their work in exchange for more leisure time. Ford also believed decent leisure time was good for business, giving workers additional time to purchase and consume more goods. However, charitable concerns also played a role. Ford explained, "It is high time to rid ourselves of the notion that leisure for workmen is either 'lost time' or a class privilege."

===== Labor unions =====
Ford was adamantly against labor unions, describing them as "the worst thing that ever struck the earth". He explained his views on unions in Chapter 18 of My Life and Work. He thought they were too heavily influenced by leaders who would end up doing more harm than good for workers, despite their ostensible good motives. Most wanted to restrict productivity as a means to foster employment, but Ford saw this as self-defeating because, in his view, productivity was necessary for economic prosperity to exist.

He believed that productivity gains that obviated certain jobs would nevertheless stimulate the broader economy and grow new jobs elsewhere, whether within the same corporation or in others. Ford also believed that union leaders had a perverse incentive to foment perpetual socio-economic crises to maintain their power. Meanwhile, he believed that smart managers had an incentive to do right by their workers, because doing so would maximize their profits. However, Ford did acknowledge that many managers were basically too bad at managing to understand this fact. But Ford believed that eventually, if good managers such as he could fend off the attacks of misguided people from both left and right (i.e., both socialists and bad-manager reactionaries), the good managers would create a socio-economic system wherein neither bad management nor bad unions could find enough support to continue existing.

To forestall union activity, Ford promoted Harry Bennett, a former Navy boxer, to head the Service Department. Bennett employed various intimidation tactics to quash union organizing. On March 7, 1932, during the Great Depression, unemployed Detroit auto workers staged the Ford Hunger March to the Ford River Rouge Complex to present 14 demands to Henry Ford. The Dearborn police department and Ford security guards opened fire on workers, leading to over sixty injuries and five deaths. On May 26, 1937, Bennett's security men beat members of the United Automobile Workers (UAW), including Walter Reuther, with clubs. While Bennett's men were beating the UAW representatives, the supervising police chief on the scene was Carl Brooks, an alumnus of Bennett's Service Department, and Brooks "did not give orders to intervene".The following day photographs of the injured UAW members appeared in newspapers, later becoming known as The Battle of the Overpass.

In the late 1930s and early 1940s, Edsel—who was president of the company—thought Ford had to come to a collective bargaining agreement with the unions because the violence, work disruptions, and bitter stalemates could not go on forever. But Ford, who still had the final veto in the company on a de facto basis even if not an official one, refused to cooperate. For several years, he kept Bennett in charge of talking to the unions trying to organize the Ford Motor Company. Sorensen's memoir makes clear that Ford's purpose in putting Bennett in charge was to make sure no agreements were ever reached.

The Ford Motor Company was the last Detroit automaker to recognize the UAW, despite pressure from the rest of the U.S. automotive industry and even the U.S. government. A sit-down strike by the UAW union in April 1941 closed the River Rouge Plant. Sorensen recounted that a distraught Henry Ford was very close to following through with a threat to break up the company rather than cooperate. Still, his wife, Clara, told him she would leave him if he destroyed the family business. In her view, it would not be worth the chaos it would create. Ford complied with his wife's ultimatum and even agreed with her in retrospect.

Overnight, the Ford Motor Company went from the most stubborn holdout among automakers to the one with the most favorable UAW contract terms. The contract was signed in June 1941. About a year later, Ford told Walter Reuther, "It was one of the most sensible things Harry Bennett ever did when he got the UAW into this plant." Reuther inquired, "What do you mean?" Ford replied, "Well, you've been fighting General Motors and the Wall Street crowd. Now you're in here, and we've given you a union shop and more than you got out of them. That puts you on our side, doesn't it? We can fight General Motors and Wall Street together, eh?"

=== Ford Airplane Company ===
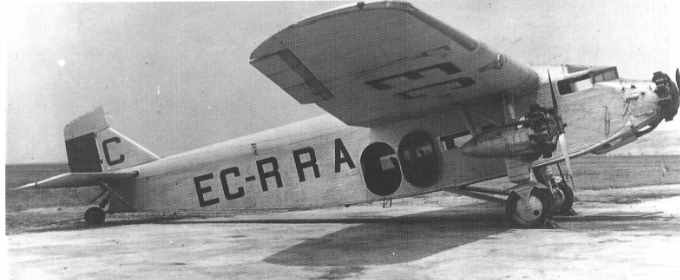
Ford 4-AT-F (EC-RRA) of the Spanish Republican Airline, L.A.P.E.

Like other automobile companies, Ford entered the aviation business during World War I, building Liberty engines. After the war, it returned to auto manufacturing until 1925, when Ford acquired the Stout Metal Airplane Company.

Ford's most successful aircraft was the Ford 4AT Trimotor, often called the "Tin Goose" because of its corrugated metal construction. It used a new alloy called Alclad that combined the corrosion resistance of aluminum with the strength of duralumin. The plane was similar to Fokker's V.VII–3m. The Trimotor first flew on June 11, 1926, and was the first successful U.S. passenger airliner, accommodating about 12 passengers in a rather uncomfortable fashion. Several variants were also used by the U.S. Army. The Smithsonian Institution has honored Ford for changing the aviation industry. 199 Trimotors were built before it was discontinued in 1933, when the Ford Airplane Division shut down because of poor sales during the Great Depression.

In 1985, Ford was posthumously inducted into the National Aviation Hall of Fame for his impact on the industry.

==== World War I era and peace activism ====
Ford opposed war, which he viewed as a terrible waste, and supported causes that opposed military intervention. Ford became highly critical of those who he felt financed war, and he tried to stop them. In 1915, the pacifist Rosika Schwimmer gained favor with Ford, who agreed to fund a Peace Ship to Europe, where World War I was raging. He led 170 other peace activists. Ford's Episcopalian pastor, Reverend Samuel S. Marquis, accompanied him on the mission. Marquis headed Ford's Sociology Department from 1913 to 1921. Ford talked to President Woodrow Wilson about the mission, but had no government support. His group went to neutral Sweden and the Netherlands to meet with peace activists. A target of much ridicule, Ford left the ship as soon as it reached Sweden. In 1915, Ford blamed "German-Jewish bankers" for instigating the war.

According to biographer Steven Watts, Ford's status as a leading industrialist gave him a worldview that warfare was wasteful folly that retarded long-term economic growth. The losing side in the war typically suffered heavy damage. Small businesses were especially hurt, for it takes years to recuperate. He argued in many newspaper articles that a focus on business efficiency would discourage warfare because, "If every man who manufactures an article would make the very best he can in the very best way at the very lowest possible price, the world would be kept out of war, for commercialists would not have to search for outside markets which the other fellow covets." Ford admitted that munitions makers enjoyed wars, but he argued that most businesses wanted to avoid wars and instead work to manufacture and sell useful goods, hire workers, and generate steady, long-term profits.

Ford's British factories produced Fordson tractors to increase the British food supply, as well as trucks and warplane engines. When the U.S. entered the war in 1917, Ford went quiet on foreign policy. His company became a major supplier of weapons, especially the Liberty engine for warplanes and anti-submarine boats.

In 1918, with the war on and the League of Nations a growing issue in global politics, President Woodrow Wilson, a Democrat, encouraged Ford to run for a Michigan seat in the U.S. Senate. Wilson believed that Ford could tip the scales in Congress in favor of Wilson's proposed League. "You are the only man in Michigan who can be elected and help bring about the peace you so desire," the president wrote Ford. Ford wrote back: "If they want to elect me, let them do so, but I won't make a penny's investment." Ford did run, however, and came within 7,000 votes of winning, out of more than 400,000 cast statewide. He was defeated in a close election by the Republican candidate, Truman Newberry, a former United States Secretary of the Navy. Ford remained a staunch Wilsonian and supporter of the League. When Wilson made a major speaking tour in the summer of 1919 to promote the League, Ford helped fund the attendant publicity.

In 1919, Ford sued the Chicago Tribune for libel after the Tribune called him an “anarchist” in an editorial. The Tribune’s writer used the term in response to Ford’s opposition to President Woodrow Wilson sending military forces to the Mexican border in 1916 and Ford calling soldiers “murderers.” The trial lasted over the summer of 1919 and several prominent witnesses including generals were called to testify. So too were three history professors, Columbia University’s William Archibald Dunning, Ohio State University’s Francis Coker (who earned his Ph.D under Dunning), and University of Michigan’s Jesse Siddall Reeves. As expert witnesses, the three provided differing definitions of anarchism which, unlike Marxism, had no philosophical “father.” In the end Ford prevailed on the question of whether he was libeled but the jury only awarded him six cents and he asked for $1million.

==== World War II era and controversies ====
Ford opposed the United States' entry into World War II and continued to believe that international business could generate the prosperity that would head off wars. Ford "insisted that war was the product of greedy financiers who sought profit in human destruction". In 1939, he went so far as to claim that the torpedoing of U.S. merchant ships by German submarines was the result of conspiratorial activities undertaken by war-financier makers. The financiers to whom he was referring were Ford's code for Jews; he had also accused Jews of fomenting the First World War.

In the run-up to World War II and when the war erupted in 1939, he reported that he did not want to trade with belligerents. Like many other businessmen of the Great Depression era, he never liked or entirely trusted the Franklin Roosevelt administration and thought Roosevelt was inching the U.S. closer to war. Ford continued to do business with Nazi Germany, including the manufacture of war materiel. However, he also agreed to build warplane engines for the British government. In early 1940, he boasted that Ford Motor Company would soon be able to produce 1,000 U.S. warplanes a day, even though it did not have an aircraft production facility at that time. Ford was a prominent early member of the America First Committee against World War II involvement, but was forced to resign from its executive board when his involvement proved too controversial.

Beginning in 1940, with the requisitioning of between 100 and 200 French POWs to work as slave laborers, Ford-Werke contravened Article 31 of the 1929 Geneva Convention.

When Rolls-Royce sought a U.S. manufacturer as an additional source for the Merlin engine (as fitted to Spitfire and Hurricane fighters), Ford first agreed to do so and then reneged. He "lined up behind the war effort" when the U.S. entered in December 1941.

==== Willow Run ====
Before the U.S. entered the war, responding to President Roosevelt's call in December 1940 for the "Great Arsenal of Democracy", Ford directed the Ford Motor Company to construct a vast new purpose-built aircraft factory at Willow Run near Detroit, Michigan. Ford broke ground on Willow Run in the spring of 1941, B-24 component production began in May 1942, and the first complete B-24 came off the assembly line in October 1942. At 3,500,000 ft^{2} (330,000 m^{2}), it was the largest assembly line in the world at the time. At its peak in 1944, the Willow Run plant produced 650 B-24s per month, and by 1945, Ford was completing each B-24 in eighteen hours, with one rolling off the assembly line every 58 minutes. Ford produced 9,000 B-24s at Willow Run, half of the 18,000 total B-24s produced during the war.

==== Edsel's death ====
When Edsel Ford died of cancer in 1943, at age 49, Henry Ford nominally resumed control of the company, but a series of strokes in the late 1930s had left him increasingly debilitated, and his mental ability was fading. Ford was increasingly sidelined, and others made decisions in his name. The company was controlled by a handful of senior executives led by Charles Sorensen, an important engineer and production executive at Ford, and Harry Bennett, the chief of Ford's Service Unit, Ford's paramilitary force that spied on and enforced discipline upon Ford employees. Ford grew jealous of the publicity Sorensen received and forced Sorensen out in 1944. Ford's incompetence led to discussions in Washington about how to restore the company, whether by wartime government fiat or by instigating a coup among executives and directors.

==== Forced out ====
Nothing happened until 1945, when, with bankruptcy a serious risk, Ford's wife Clara and Edsel's widow Eleanor confronted him and demanded he cede control of the company to his grandson Henry Ford II. They threatened to sell off their stock, which amounted to three-quarters of the company's total shares, if he refused. Ford was reportedly infuriated, but he had no choice but to give in. The young man took over and, as his first act of business, fired Harry Bennett.

== Antisemitism and The Dearborn Independent ==
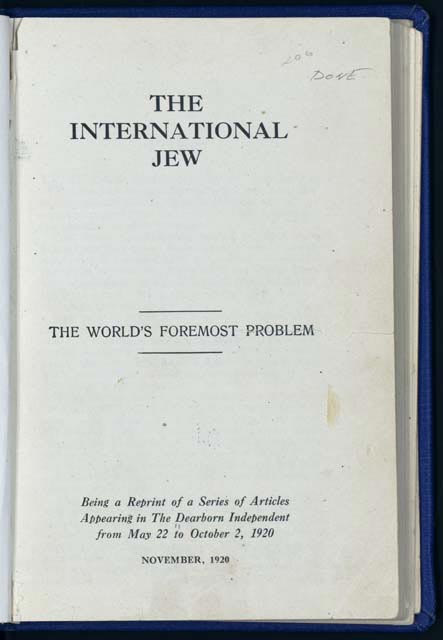
The Ford publication The International Jew, the World's Foremost Problem. Articles from The Dearborn Independent, 1920

Ford was a conspiracy theorist who drew on a long tradition of false allegations against Jews. Ford claimed that Jewish internationalism posed a threat to traditional American values, which he deeply believed were at risk in the modern world. Part of his racist and antisemitic legacy includes the funding of square-dancing in American schools because he hated jazz and associated its creation with Jewish people. In 1920, Ford wrote, "If fans wish to know the trouble with American baseball they have it in three words—too much Jew."

In 1918, Ford purchased his hometown newspaper, The Dearborn Independent. In early 1920, Ford procured a copy of The Protocols of the Elders of Zion, an infamously antisemitic fabricated text. He instructed the editors at the Independent to adapt the material in the Protocols to appeal to American audiences. Later in 1920, Ford's paper began publishing a series of articles in the paper, claiming a vast Jewish conspiracy was affecting America. The series ran in 91 issues. Every Ford dealership nationwide was required to carry the paper and distribute it to its customers. Ford later bound the articles into four volumes entitled The International Jew: The World's Foremost Problem, which was translated into multiple languages and distributed widely across the US and Europe, selling more than 500,000 copies. The International Jew blamed nearly all the troubles it saw in American society on Jews. The Independent ran under Ford's ownership until its closure in 1927. With around 700,000 readers of his newspaper, Ford emerged as a "spokesman for right-wing extremism and religious prejudice."

In Germany, Ford's The International Jew, the World's Foremost Problem was published by Theodor Fritsch, founder of several antisemitic parties and a member of the Reichstag, influencing German antisemitic discourse. In a letter written in 1924, Heinrich Himmler described Ford as "one of our most valuable, important, and witty fighters". Ford is the only American mentioned favorably in Hitler's autobiography Mein Kampf, which appeared five years after Ford's antisemitic pamphlets were published in book form.

Adolf Hitler wrote, "only Ford, [who], to [the Jews'] fury, still maintains full independence ... [from] the controlling masters of the producers in a nation of one hundred and twenty millions." Speaking in 1931 to a Detroit News reporter, Hitler said, "I regard Henry Ford as my inspiration," explaining his reason for keeping a life-size portrait of Ford behind his desk. Steven Watts wrote that Hitler "revered" Ford, proclaiming that "I shall do my best to put his theories into practice in Germany", and modeling the Volkswagen Beetle, the people's car, on the Model T, which was designed by members of the Austrian-German Porsche family of sportscar makers. Max Wallace has stated, "History records that ... Adolf Hitler was an ardent Anti-Semite before he ever read Ford's The International Jew." Historians say Hitler distributed Ford's books and articles throughout Germany, stoking the hatred that helped fuel the Holocaust.

On February 1, 1924, Ford received Kurt Ludecke, a representative of Hitler, at home. Ludecke was introduced to Ford by Siegfried Wagner (son of the composer Richard Wagner) and his wife Winifred, both Nazi sympathizers and anti-Semites. Ludecke asked Ford for a contribution to the Nazi cause, but was apparently refused. Ford did, however, give considerable sums of money to Boris Brasol, a member of the Aufbau Vereinigung, an organization linking German Nazis and White Russian emigrants, which financed the recently established Nazi Party. (Note: Max Wallace. The American Axis: Henry Ford, Charles Lindbergh, and the Rise of the Third Reich, (Macmillan, 2004), pp. 50–54, ISBN 0312335318. Years later, in 1977, Winifred claimed that Ford had told her that he had helped finance Hitler. This anecdote is the suggestion that Ford made a contribution. The company has always denied that any contribution was made, and no documentary evidence has ever been found (ibid p. 54). However, according to a captured Nazi document, the German subsidiary of Ford made a personal present to Hitler of 35,000 Reichsmarks in honor of his 50th birthday, in April 1939. See also Neil Baldwin, Henry Ford and the Jews: The Mass Production of Hate (Public Affairs, 2002), pp. 185–89, ISBN 1-58648-163-0.)

Ford's articles were denounced by the Anti-Defamation League (ADL). While these articles explicitly condemned pogroms and violence against Jews, they blamed the Jews themselves for provoking them. According to some trial testimony, none of this work was written by Ford, but he allowed his name to be used as an author. Friends and business associates said they warned Ford about the contents of the Independent and that he probably never read the articles (he claimed he only read the headlines). On the other hand, court testimony in a libel suit, brought by one of the targets of the newspaper, alleged that Ford did know about the contents of the Independent in advance of publication.

A libel lawsuit was brought by San Francisco lawyer and Jewish farm cooperative organizer Aaron Sapiro in response to the antisemitic remarks, and led Ford to close the Independent in December 1927. News reports at the time quoted him as saying he was shocked by the content and unaware of its nature. During the trial, the editor of Ford's "Own Page", William Cameron, testified that Ford had nothing to do with the editorials even though they were under his byline. Cameron testified at the libel trial that he never discussed the content of the pages or sent them to Ford for his approval. Investigative journalist Max Wallace noted that "whatever credibility this absurd claim may have had was soon undermined when James M. Miller, a former Dearborn Independent employee, swore under oath that Ford had told him he intended to expose Sapiro."

Michael Barkun observed: "That Cameron would have continued to publish such anti-Semitic material without Ford's explicit instructions seemed unthinkable to those who knew both men. Mrs. Stanley Ruddiman, a Ford family intimate, remarked that "I don't think Mr. Cameron ever wrote anything for publication without Mr. Ford's approval." According to Spencer Blakeslee, "[t]he ADL mobilized prominent Jews and non-Jews to publicly oppose Ford's message. They formed a coalition of Jewish groups for the same purpose and raised constant objections in the Detroit press. Before leaving his presidency early in 1921, Woodrow Wilson joined other leading Americans in a statement that rebuked Ford and others for their antisemitic campaign. A boycott against Ford products by Jews and liberal Christians also had an impact, and Ford shut down the paper in 1927, recanting his views in a public letter to Sigmund Livingston, president of the ADL." Wallace also found that Ford's apology was likely, or at least partly, motivated by a business that was slumping as a result of his antisemitism, repelling potential buyers of Ford cars. Up until the apology, a considerable number of dealers, who had been required to make sure that buyers of Ford cars received the Independent, bought up and destroyed copies of the newspaper rather than alienate customers.

Ford's 1927 apology was well received. "Four-fifths of the hundreds of letters addressed to Ford in July 1927 were from Jews, and almost without exception they praised the industrialist..." In January 1937, a Ford statement to The Detroit Jewish Chronicle disavowed "any connection whatsoever with the publication in Germany of a book known as the International Jew". Ford, however, allegedly never signed the retraction and apology, which were written by others—rather, his signature was forged by Harry Bennett—and Ford never actually recanted his antisemitic views, stating in 1940: "I hope to republish The International Jew again some time."

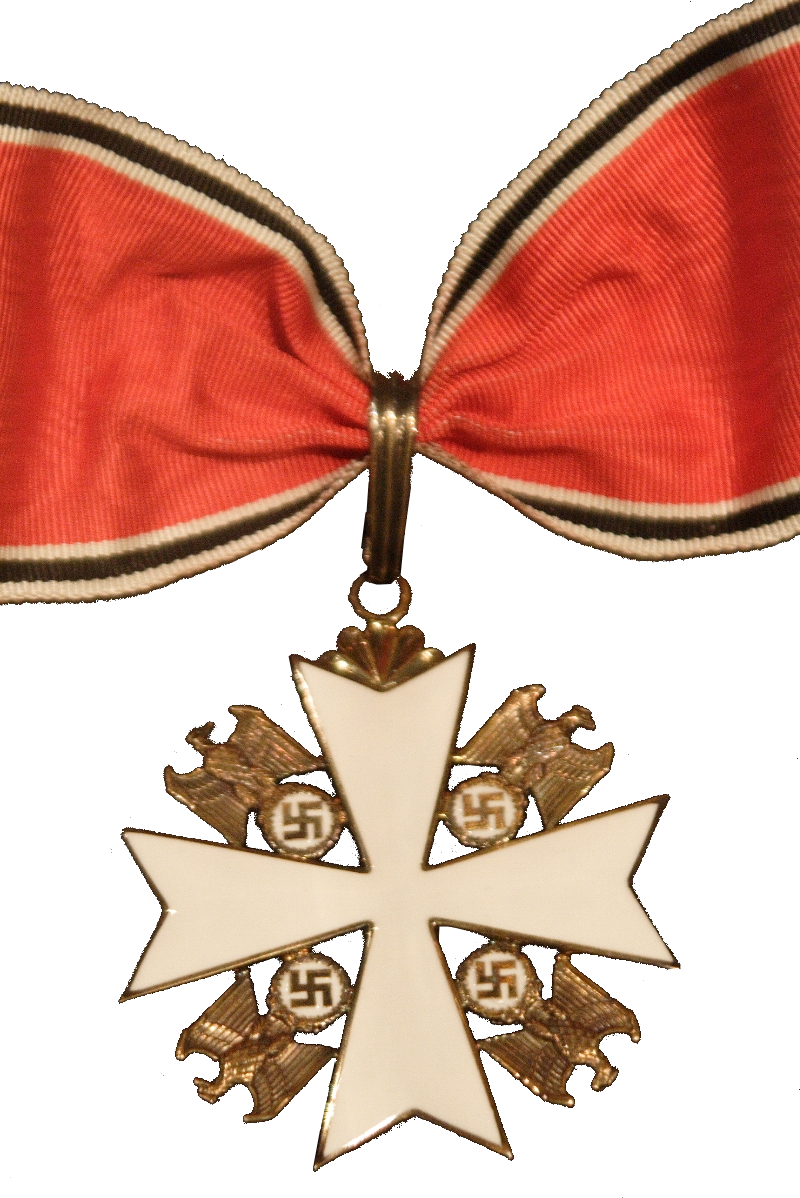
Grand Cross of the German Eagle, an award bestowed on Henry Ford by Nazi Germany on July 30, 1938.

In July 1938, the German consul in Cleveland gave Ford, on his 75th birthday, the award of the Grand Cross of the German Eagle, the highest medal Nazi Germany could bestow on a foreigner. James D. Mooney, vice president of overseas operations for General Motors, received a similar medal, the Merit Cross of the German Eagle, First Class.

On January 7, 1942, Ford wrote another letter to Sigmund Livingston disclaiming direct or indirect support of "any agitation which would promote antagonism toward my Jewish fellow citizens". He concluded the letter with, "My sincere hope that now in this country and throughout the world when the war is finished, hatred of the Jews and hatred against any other racial or religious groups shall cease for all time."

The distribution of The International Jew was halted in 1942 through legal action by Ford, despite complications from a lack of copyright. Testifying at Nuremberg, convicted Hitler Youth leader Baldur von Schirach who, in his role as Gauleiter of Vienna, deported 65,000 Jews to camps in Poland, stated: "The decisive anti-Semitic book I was reading and the book that influenced my comrades was ... that book by Henry Ford, The International Jew. I read it and became anti-Semitic. The book made a great influence on me and my friends because we saw in Henry Ford the representative of success and also the representative of a progressive social policy."

Robert Lacey wrote in Ford: The Men and the Machines that a close Willow Run associate of Ford reported that when he was shown newsreel footage of the Nazi concentration camps, he "was confronted with the atrocities which finally and unanswerably laid bare the bestiality of the prejudice to which he contributed, he collapsed with a stroke – his last and most serious." Ford had suffered previous strokes and his final cerebral hemorrhage occurred in 1947 at age 83.

== International business ==
After signing the contract for technical assistance in building Nizhny Novgorod (Gorky) Automobile Plant. Dearborn, Mich., May 31, 1929. Left to right, Valery I. Mezhlauk, Vice Chairman of VSNKh; Henry Ford; Saul G. Bron, President of Amtorg.

Ford's philosophy was one of economic independence for the United States. His River Rouge Plant became the world's largest industrial complex, pursuing vertical integration to such an extent that it could produce its own steel. Ford's goal was to produce an automobile from scratch without reliance on foreign trade. He believed in the global expansion of his company. He believed that international trade and cooperation led to international peace, and he used the assembly line process and production of the Model T to demonstrate it.

He opened Ford assembly plants in Britain and Canada in 1911, and soon became the biggest automobile manufacturer in those countries. In 1912, Ford cooperated with Giovanni Agnelli of Fiat to launch the first Italian automotive assembly plants. The first plants in Germany were built in the 1920s with the encouragement of Herbert Hoover and the Commerce Department, which agreed with Ford's theory that international trade was essential to world peace and reduced the chance of war. In the 1920s, Ford also opened plants in Australia, France, India, and Mexico, and by 1929, he had successful dealerships on six continents. Ford experimented with a commercial rubber plantation in the Amazon jungle called Fordlândia; it failed.

In 1929, Ford agreed with the Soviets to provide technical aid over nine years in building the first Soviet automobile plant (GAZ) near Nizhny Novgorod (Gorky) (an additional contract for construction of the plant was signed with The Austin Company on August 23, 1929). The contract involved the purchase of $30,000,000 worth of knocked-down Ford cars and trucks for assembly during the first four years of the plant's operation, after which the plant would gradually switch to Soviet-made components. Ford sent his engineers and technicians to the Soviet Union to help install the equipment and train the workforce, while over a hundred Soviet engineers and technicians were stationed at Ford's plants in Detroit and Dearborn "for the purpose of learning the methods and practice of manufacture and assembly in the Company's plants". Said Ford: "No matter where industry prospers, whether in India or China, or Russia, the more profit there will be for everyone, including us. All the world is bound to catch some good from it."

By 1932, Ford was manufacturing one-third of the world's automobiles. It set up numerous subsidiaries that sold or assembled the Ford cars and trucks:

- Ford of Australia
- Ford of Britain
- Ford of Argentina
- Ford of Brazil
- Ford of Canada
- Ford of Europe
- Ford India
- Ford South Africa
- Ford Philippines

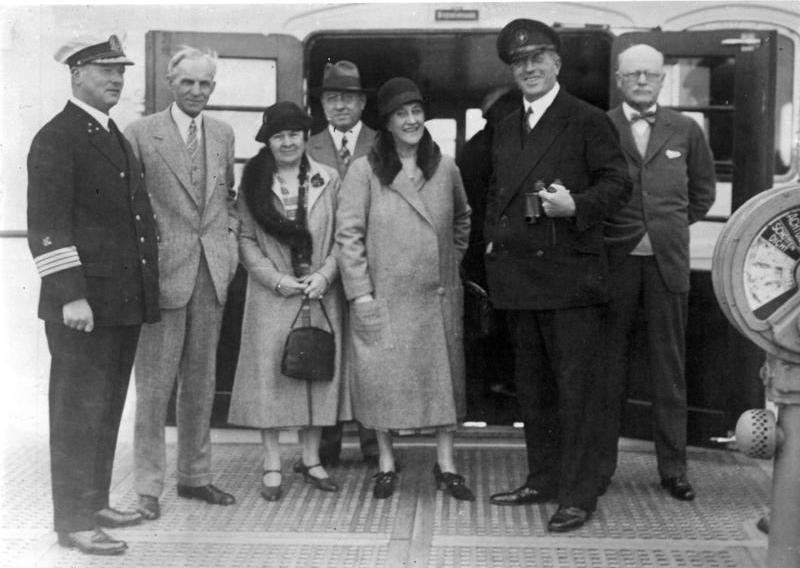
Henry Ford in Germany; September 1930

Ford's image transfixed Europeans, especially the Germans, arousing the "fear of some, the infatuation of others, and the fascination among all". Germans who discussed "Fordism" often believed that it represented something quintessentially American. They saw the size, tempo, standardization, and philosophy of production demonstrated at the Ford Works as a national service—an "American thing" that represented the culture of the United States. Both supporters and critics insisted that Fordism epitomized American capitalist development, and that the auto industry was the key to understanding economic and social relations in the United States. As one German explained, "Automobiles have so completely changed the American's mode of life that today one can hardly imagine being without a car. It is difficult to remember what life was like before Mr. Ford began preaching his doctrine of salvation". For many Germans, Ford embodied the essence of successful Americanism.

In My Life and Work, Ford predicted that if greed, racism, and short-sightedness could be overcome, then economic and technological development throughout the world would progress to the point that international trade would no longer be based on (what today would be called) colonial or neocolonial models and would truly benefit all peoples.

== Racing ==
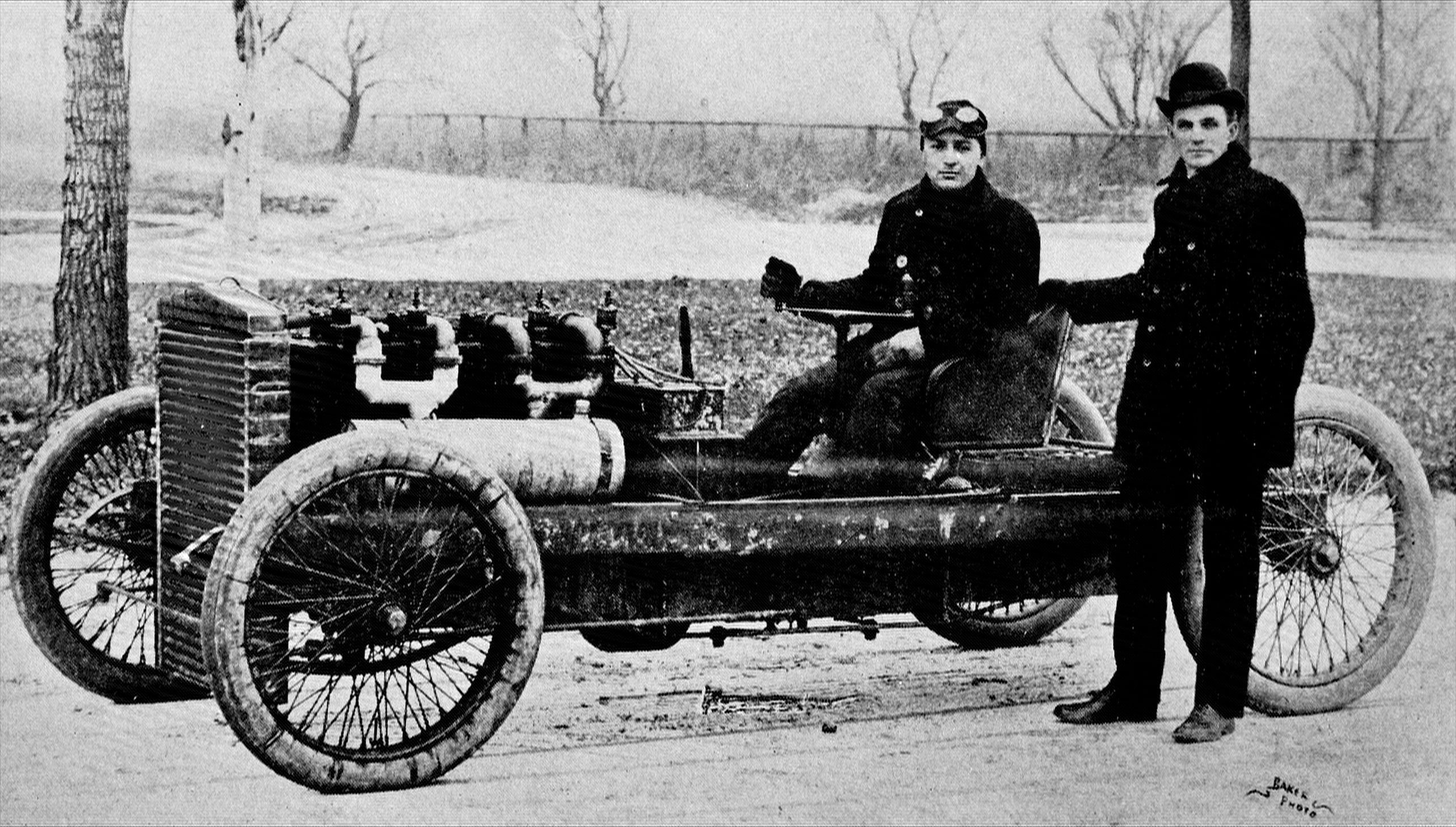
Ford (standing) launched Barney Oldfield's career in 1902.

Ford maintained an interest in auto racing from 1901 to 1913 and began his involvement in the sport as both a constructor and a driver, later turning the wheel over to hired drivers. On October 10, 1901, he defeated Alexander Winton in a race car named "Sweepstakes"; it was through the wins of this car that Ford created the Henry Ford Company. Ford entered stripped-down Model Ts in races, finishing first (although later disqualified) in an "ocean-to-ocean" (across the United States) race in 1909, and setting a one-mile (1.6 km) oval speed record at Detroit Fairgrounds in 1911 with driver Frank Kulick. In 1913, he attempted to enter a reworked Model T in the Indianapolis 500 but was told rules required the addition of another 1,000 pounds (450 kg) to the car before it could qualify. Ford dropped out of the race and soon thereafter exited racing permanently, citing dissatisfaction with the sport's rules, demands on his time by the booming production of the Model T, and his low opinion of racing as a worthwhile activity.

In My Life and Work Ford speaks (briefly) of racing in a rather dismissive tone, as something that is not at all a good measure of automobiles in general. He describes himself as someone who raced only because in the 1890s through 1910s, one had to race because prevailing ignorance held that racing was the way to prove the worth of an automobile. Ford did not agree. But he was determined that as long as this was the definition of success (flawed though the definition was), then his cars would be the best that there were at racing. Throughout the book, he continually returns to ideals such as transportation, production efficiency, affordability, reliability, fuel efficiency, economic prosperity, and the automation of drudgery in farming and industry, but rarely mentions, and rather belittles, the idea of merely going fast from point A to point B.

Nevertheless, Ford did make an impact on auto racing during his racing years, and he was inducted into the Motorsports Hall of Fame of America in 1996.

== Later career and death ==
By 1943, Henry Ford's health was in decline. He had suffered multiple cardiovascular events and was exhibiting signs of mental inconsistency, including increased suspicion and an inability to manage the immense responsibilities of running the company he founded. Despite his advanced age of nearly 80 and the reservations of the board of directors, Ford resumed the presidency of Ford Motor Company following the death of his son, Edsel Ford, in May 1943. While he had not held an official executive title for two decades, his de facto control over the company had never been seriously challenged, and the board once again yielded to his authority, electing him to the presidency.

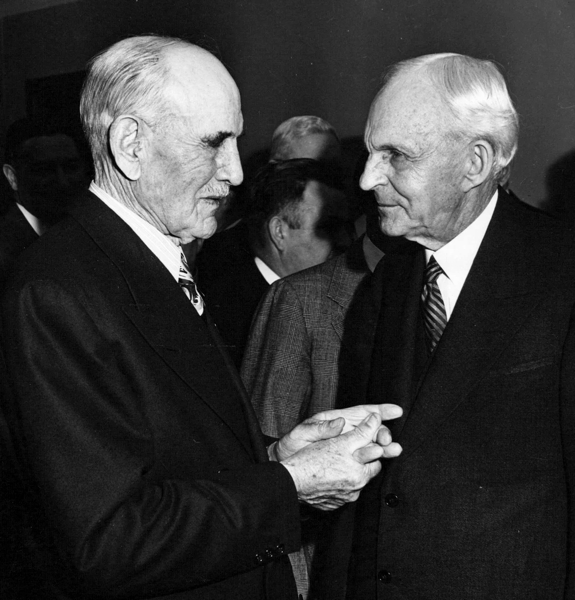
Charles W. Nash and Ford at the 1946 Automotive Jubilee, when both were 82

The company's financial state deteriorated significantly during his final term as president. It was losing over $10 million a month ($186,060,000 today), and its operations were in such disarray that the Franklin Roosevelt administration reportedly considered a government takeover to ensure the company's continued contribution to the war effort. This plan never came to fruition, and Ford's presidency ended when he ceded control to his grandson, Henry Ford II, in September 1945, at which point he retired completely.

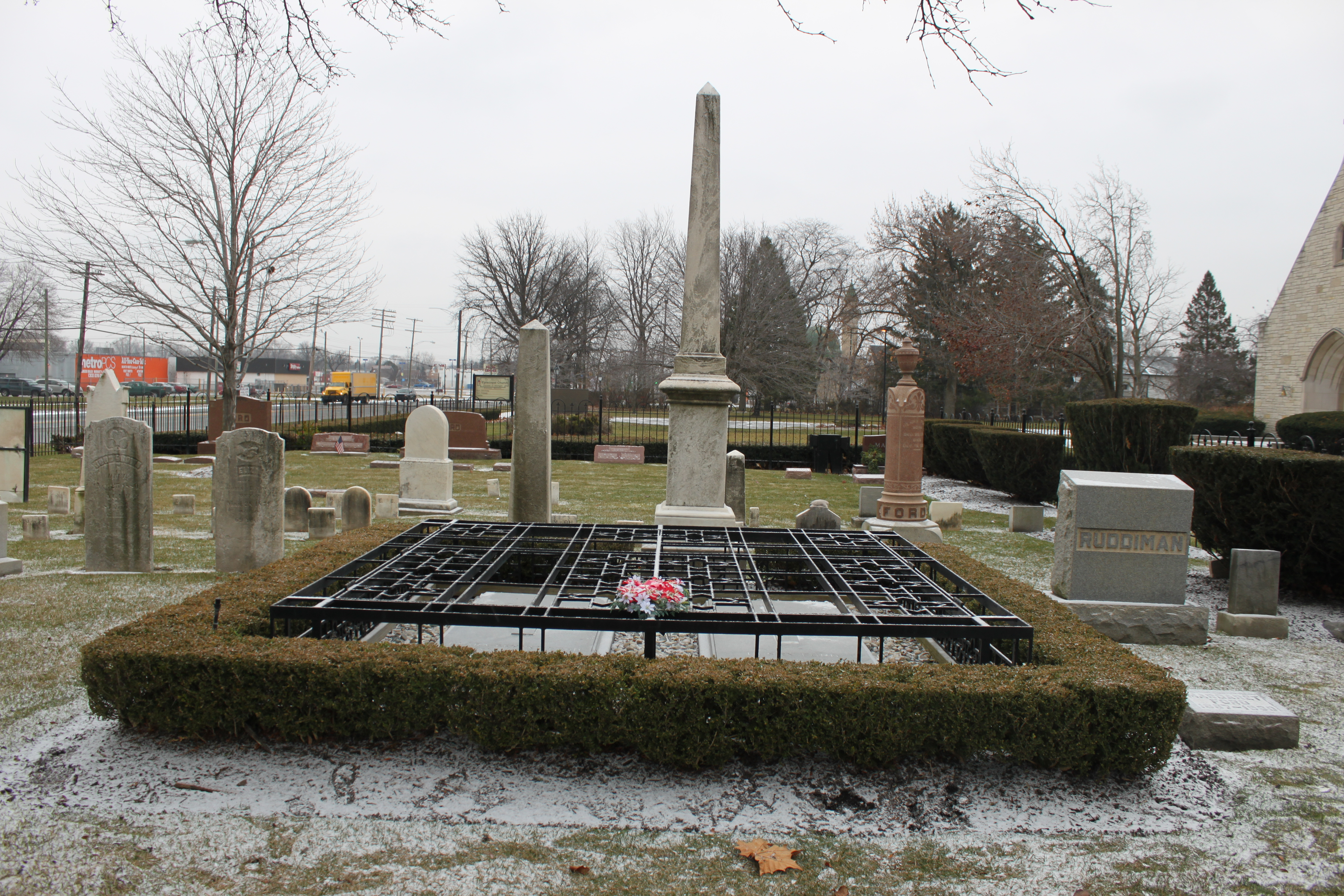
Ford grave, Ford Cemetery

Ford was honored for his profound impact on the automotive industry a year before his death. The Automobile Manufacturers Association sponsored the "Automotive Golden Jubilee". Numerous events celebrated Detroit's status as the "Automobile Capital of the World" and commemorated the production of over 90 million automobiles in the industry's first 50 years. The culminating ceremony on May 31, 1946, brought together fourteen living automotive pioneers. Ford was awarded for contributing to industrial development and "putting the world on wheels".

Ford died on April 7, 1947, at the age of 83, from a cerebral hemorrhage at his estate, Fair Lane, in Dearborn, Michigan. A public viewing was held at Greenfield Village, attracting up to 5,000 people per hour who paid their respects. Funeral services took place at Cathedral Church of St. Paul, and he was laid to rest at the Ford Cemetery in Detroit.

== Personal interests ==
A compendium of short biographies of famous Freemasons, published by a Freemason lodge, lists Ford as a member. The Grand Lodge of New York confirms that Ford was a Freemason and was raised in Palestine Lodge No. 357, Detroit, in 1894. When he received the 33rd degree of the Scottish Rite in 1940, he said, "Masonry is the best balance wheel the United States has."

In 1923, Ford's pastor and head of his sociology department, Episcopal minister Samuel S. Marquis, claimed that Ford believed, or "once believed," in reincarnation.

Ford published an anti-smoking book, circulated to youth in 1914, called The Case Against the Little White Slaver, which documented many dangers of cigarette smoking attested to by many researchers and luminaries. At the time, smoking was ubiquitous and not yet widely associated with health problems, making Ford's opposition to cigarettes unusual.

Ford contributed to the article "Mass Production" in the Encyclopedia Britannica.

=== Interest in materials science and engineering ===
Henry Ford had a long-held interest in materials science and engineering. He enthusiastically described his company's adoption of vanadium steel alloys and subsequent metallurgical R&D work.

Ford also had a long-standing interest in plastics developed from agricultural products, particularly soybeans. He cultivated a relationship with George Washington Carver for this purpose. Soybean-based plastics were used in Ford automobiles throughout the 1930s in plastic parts such as car horns, in paint and other components. The project culminated in 1942, when Ford patented an automobile made almost entirely of plastic, attached to a tubular welded frame. It weighed 30% less than a steel car and was said to be able to withstand blows ten times greater than steel. It ran on grain alcohol (ethanol) instead of gasoline. The design never caught on.

Ford was interested in engineered woods ("Better wood can be made than is grown") (at this time plywood and particle board were little more than experimental ideas); corn as a fuel source, via both corn oil and ethanol; and the potential uses of cotton. Ford was instrumental in developing charcoal briquets, under the brand name "Kingsford". His cousin-in-law, Edward G. Kingsford, used wood scraps from the Ford factory to make the briquets.

In 1927, Ford partnered with Thomas Edison and Harvey Samuel Firestone (each contributing $25,000) to create the Edison Botanic Research Corporation in Fort Myers, Florida, to seek a native source of rubber.

Ford was a prolific inventor and was awarded 161 U.S. patents.

=== Florida and Georgia residences and community ===
Ford had a vacation residence in Fort Myers, Florida, next to that of Thomas Edison, which he bought in 1915 and used until c. 1930. It still stands today as a museum.

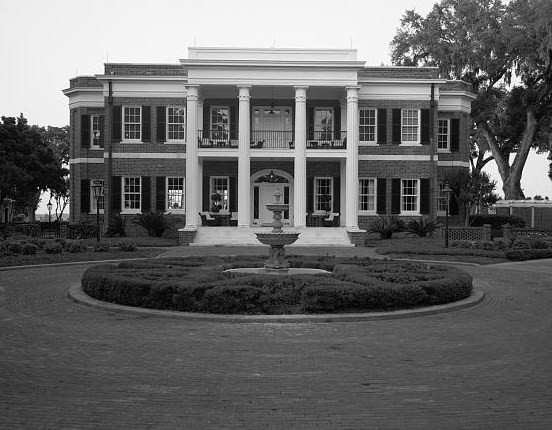
The Ford Mansion on the Richmond Hill Plantation.

He also had a vacation home (known today as the "Ford Plantation") in Richmond Hill, Georgia, which is now a private community. Ford started buying land in this area and eventually owned 70,000 acres (110 square miles) there. In 1936, Ford broke ground for a beautiful Greek revival style mansion on the banks of the Ogeechee River on the site of a 1730s plantation. The grand house, made of Savannah-gray brick, had marble steps, air conditioning, and an elevator. It sat on 55 acres (22 ha) of manicured lawns and flowering gardens. The house became the center of social gatherings with visits by the Vanderbilts, Rockefellers, and the DuPonts. It remains the centerpiece of The Ford Plantation today. Ford converted the 1870s-era rice mill into his personal research laboratory and powerhouse and constructed a tunnel from there to the new home, providing it with steam. He contributed substantially to the community, building a chapel and schoolhouse and employing numerous residents.

=== Preserving Americana ===
Ford had an interest in Americana. In the 1920s, he began work to turn Sudbury, Massachusetts, into a themed historical village. He moved the Redstone schoolhouse, supposedly referred to in the "Mary Had a Little Lamb" nursery rhyme, from Sterling, Massachusetts, and purchased the historic Wayside Inn. The historical village plan never came to fruition. He repeated the concept of collecting historic structures with the creation of Greenfield Village in Dearborn, Michigan. It may have inspired the creation of Old Sturbridge Village as well. About the same time, he began collecting materials for his museum, which had a theme of practical technology. It was opened in 1929 as the Edison Institute. The museum has been greatly modernized and is still open today.

== In popular culture ==
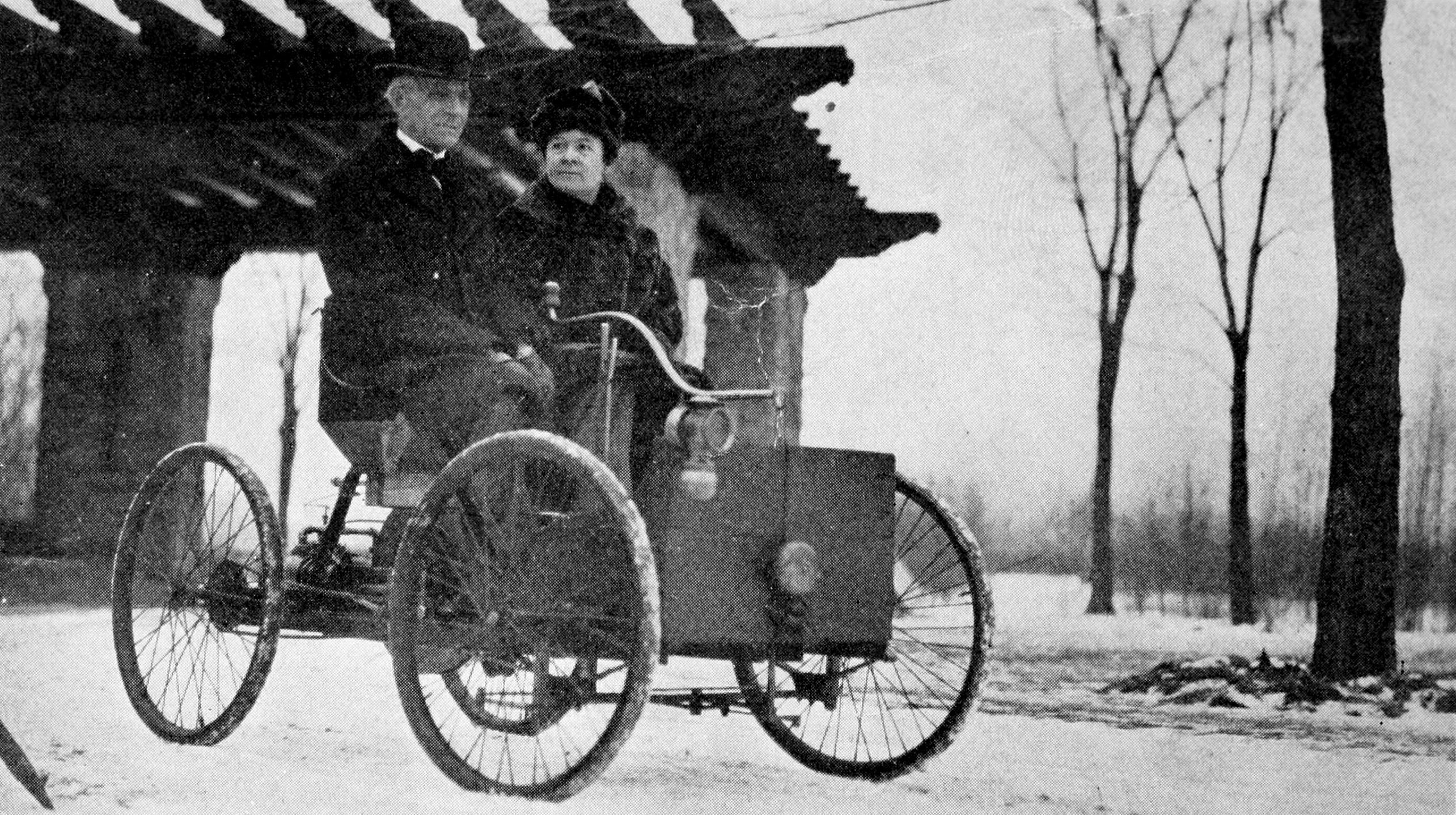
Henry and Clara Ford in his first car, the Ford Quadricycle

- In the 1927 classic film Metropolis, Joh Frederson, the cold, calculating master of the city played by Alfred Abel, bears a striking resemblance to Henry Ford.
- In Aldous Huxley's Brave New World (1932), society is organized on "Fordist" lines, the years are dated A.F. or Anno Ford ("In the Year of Ford"), and the expression "My Ford" is used instead of "My Lord". The Christian cross is replaced with a capital "T" for Model-T.
- Upton Sinclair created a fictional description of Ford in the 1937 novel The Flivver King.
- Symphonic composer Ferde Grofé composed a tone poem in Henry Ford's honor (1938).
- "Lord, Mr. Ford", a 1973 song written by Deena Kaye Rose and recorded by Jerry Reed for his album of the same name, describes the impact of the automobile on modern American life and has the narrator addressing Ford in the chorus.
- Ford appears as a character in several historical novels, notably E. L. Doctorow's Ragtime (1975), and Richard Powers' Three Farmers on Their Way to a Dance (1985).
- Ford, his family, and his company are the subjects of the 1987 television film Ford: The Man and the Machine, based on the 1986 biography Ford: The Men and the Machine by Robert Lacey and starring Cliff Robertson in the title role.
- In the 2004 alternative history novel The Plot Against America, Philip Roth features Ford as Secretary of the Interior in a fictional Charles Lindbergh presidential administration after Lindbergh's victory over Roosevelt in the 1940 presidential election. The novel draws heavily on the administration's antisemitism and isolationism as a catalyst for its plot.
  - In the 2020 HBO adapted miniseries of the same name, Ford is portrayed by actor Ed Moran.
- Ford's career is highlighted in the History Channel's miniseries docudrama The Men Who Built America.
- Ford appears as a Great Builder in the 2008 strategy video game Civilization Revolution.
- In the fictional history of the Assassin's Creed video game franchise, Ford is portrayed as having been a major Templar influence on the events of the Great Depression, and later World War II.
- Ford is featured as an ally of Thomas Edison in the YouTube series Super Science Friends.
- Todd Hofley portrays Ford twice in the Canadian television period detective series Murdoch Mysteries, in episode 6 of season 5 "Who Killed the Electric Carriage?" (April 3, 2012) and in episode 11 of season 13 "Staring Blindly into the Future" (January 13, 2020).
- In 2023, Ford was featured in an episode of the YouTube comedic series Epic Rap Battles of History, rapping against Karl Marx.

== Honors and recognition ==
- In 1928, Ford was awarded the Franklin Institute's Elliott Cresson Medal.
- In 1928, Ford was awarded the Grand Cross of the Order of the Crown of Romania by the Royal House of Romania.
- In 1938, Ford was awarded Nazi Germany's Grand Cross of the German Eagle, a medal given to foreigners sympathetic to Nazism.
- The United States Postal Service honored Ford with a Prominent Americans series (1965–1978) 12¢ postage stamp.
- He was inducted into the Automotive Hall of Fame in 1946.
- In 1975, Ford was posthumously inducted into the Junior Achievement U.S. Business Hall of Fame.
- In 1985, he was inducted into the National Aviation Hall of Fame.
- He was inducted into the Motorsports Hall of Fame of America in 1996.
- In December 1999, Ford was among 18 included in Gallup's List of Widely Admired People of the 20th Century, from a poll conducted of the American people.

== See also ==
- Capitalist peace
- Detroit, Toledo and Ironton Railroad
- Dodge v. Ford Motor Company
- Edison and Ford Winter Estates
- Ferdinand Porsche
- Ford family (Michigan)
- John Burroughs
- List of covers of Time magazine (1920s)
- List of richest Americans in history
- Outline of Henry Ford
- Preston Tucker
- Ransom Olds
- William Benson Mayo

Business positions
Preceded by John S. Gray	President of Ford Motor Company; July 6, 1906 – July 11, 1919	Succeeded by Edsel Ford
Preceded by Edsel Ford	President of Ford Motor Company; May 26, 1943 – September 21, 1945	Succeeded by Henry Ford II

Party political offices
First	Democratic nominee for U.S. Senator from Michigan (Class 2); 1918	Succeeded by Mortimer Elwyn Cooley
