= List of leaders of the Ford Motor Company =

== CEOs and Chairmen ==
The position of CEO and Chairman have been assumed as a single position, unless noted (CEOs who were not Chairman were generally President at the time). From April to September 2006, the role of President was absorbed into the role of Executive Chairman.

CEO and Chairman of Ford Motor Company
| No. | Name | Took office | Left office | Tenure | Role |
|---|---|---|---|---|---|
| 1 | John S. Gray | 1903 | 1906 | 3 years | CEO |
| 2 | Henry Ford | 1906 | 1945 | 39 years | CEO |
| 3 | Henry Ford II | 1945 | 1955 | 10 years | CEO |
| – | Ernest R. Breech | 1955 | 1960 | 5 years | Chairman |
| – | Henry Ford II | 1960 | March 13, 1980 | 19.5 years | Chairman |
| 4 | Philip Caldwell | 1979 | February 1, 1985 | 5.4 years | CEO |
| – | Philip Caldwell | March 13, 1980 | February 1, 1985 | 4.9 years | Chairman |
| 5 | Donald Petersen | February 1, 1985 | March 1, 1990 | 5.1 years | CEO and Chairman |
| 6 | Harold Arthur Poling | March 1, 1990 | 1993 | 3.6 years | CEO and Chairman |
| 7 | Alexander Trotman | November 1993 | December 31, 1998 | 5.2 years | CEO and Chairman |
| 8 | Jacques Nasser | January 1, 1999 | 2001 | 2.7 years | CEO |
| – | William Clay Ford Jr. | January 1, 1999 | September 5, 2006 | 7.7 years | Chairman |
| 9 | William Clay Ford Jr. | October 30, 2001 | September 5, 2006 | 4.8 years | CEO |
| – | William Clay Ford Jr. | September 5, 2006 | Present | 20 years | Executive Chairman |
| 10 | Alan Mulally | September 5, 2006 | July 1, 2014 | 7.8 years | CEO |
| 11 | Mark Fields | July 1, 2014 | May 22, 2017 | 2.9 years | CEO |
| 12 | James Hackett | May 22, 2017 | September 30, 2020 | 3.4 years | CEO |
| 13 | Jim Farley | October 1, 2020 | Present | 6 years | CEO |

== Presidents ==
The President of Ford Motor Company has been a key officer since 1903, with four noted vacancies after Semon Knudsen was fired in 1969, after two vice-chairmen were appointed in 1987, Philip Benton Jr's retirement on January 1, 1993, and Jim Padilla's retirement in April 2006.

President of Ford Motor Company
| No. | Name | Took office | Left office | Notes |
|---|---|---|---|---|
| 1 | John S. Gray | June 17, 1903 | July 6, 1906 | Died in office |
Office vacant July 6 – October 22, 1906
| 2 | Henry Ford | October 22, 1906 | January 1, 1919 | |
| 3 | Edsel Ford | January 1, 1919 | May 26, 1943 | Died in office |
| 4 | Henry Ford | May 26, 1943 | September 21, 1945 | |
| 5 | Henry Ford II | September 21, 1945 | November 9, 1960 | |
| 6 | Robert McNamara | November 9, 1960 | January 1, 1961 | The first non-Ford family member to be president since John S. Gray. Left to become Secretary of Defense after just two months. |
| 7 | John Dykstra | January 1, 1961 | May 1, 1963 | |
| 8 | Arjay Miller | May 1, 1963 | February 6, 1968 | |
| 9 | Semon Knudsen | February 6, 1968 | September 1969 | |
Office vacant September 1969 – December 10, 1970
| – | Robert Hampson | 1969 | 1970 | President of Non-Automotive |
| – | Robert Stevenson | 1969 | 1970 | President of Automotive International |
| – | Lee Iacocca | 1969 | 1970 | President of Automotive North America |
| 10 | Lee Iacocca | December 10, 1970 | July 13, 1978 | |
| 11 | Philip Caldwell | October 16, 1978 | March 13, 1980 | |
| 12 | Donald Petersen | March 13, 1980 | February 1, 1985 | |
| 13 | Harold Arthur Poling | February 1, 1985 | October 13, 1987 | |
Office vacant October 13, 1987 – 1990
| — | John E. Hardiman | 1989 | 1994 | President of Germany, Italy, and Portugal |
| 14 | Philip Benton | 1990 | January 1, 1993 | |
Office vacant January 1, 1993 – 1999
| 15 | Jacques Nasser | 1999 | 2001 | |
| 16 | William Clay Ford Jr. | 2001 | 2001 | |
| 17 | Nick Scheele | October 2001 | 2004 | President and COO |
| 17 | Nick Scheele | April 2004 | February 2005 | President |
| 18 | Jim Padilla | February 2005 | April 2006 | President and COO |
Office vacant April to September 2006
| 19 | Alan Mulally | September 2006 | June 2014 | President and CEO |
| 20 | Mark Fields | July 1, 2014 | May 2017 | President and CEO |
| 21 | Jim Hackett | May 2017 | October 2020 | President and CEO |
| 22 | James D. Farley Jr. | October 2020 | present | President and CEO |
