= Ashutosh Tewari =

American urologist, oncologist

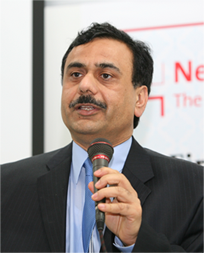
- Born: Ashutosh Kumar Tewari; Kanpur, Uttar Pradesh, India
- Education: University of Florida; University of California, San Francisco; Sanjay Gandhi Post Graduate Institute of Medical Sciences; GSVM Medical College
- Known for: Pioneering oncological research in the field of genitourinary robotic surgery and development of revolutionary techniques to maximize cancer control and recovery of urinary and sexual function
- Spouse: Mamta Tewari
- Relatives: Apoorva Ramaswamy (daughter); Vivek Ramaswamy (son in-law)
- Scientific career
- Fields: Robotic prostatectomy and urologic-oncology outcomes
- Workplaces: Icahn School of Medicine at Mount Sinai; Mount Sinai Hospital, New York
- Website: www.prostatecancercenternyc.com

Ashutosh Kumar Tewari is an Indian-American urologist and scientist specializing in prostate cancer. He is the surgeon-in-chief at the Tisch Cancer Hospital and chairman of urology at the Icahn School of Medicine at Mount Sinai Hospital in New York City.

== Robotic prostatectomy ==
With the introduction of the da Vinci Surgical System, the advent of robotic surgery using a laparoscopic approach has significantly changed the way prostate cancer surgery and prostatectomy procedures in general are performed as compared to the traditional 'open' methodology. Much of Tewari's research projects serve to promote robotic surgery as opposed to open procedures. For example, Tewari has shown that the operating field has become more visible to the surgeon, unobscured by the copious amounts of blood encountered in traditional surgery and is thus able to view the urological structures under three-dimensional, enlarged magnification. Patients reap even greater benefits. Due to the minimally invasive nature of the procedure, they experience minimized pain, minimized blood loss, less scarring and fewer complications. Post-surgery recovery is accelerated and patients experience quicker return to urinary continence and sexual function.

== Career ==
On 15 October 2013, Tewari was named the chairman of urology at the Icahn School of Medicine at Mount Sinai Hospital in New York City. Previously he served as director of the Lefrak Institute of Robotic Surgery, director of prostate cancer, as well as the director of robotic prostatectomy and prostate cancer-urologic oncology outcomes at the Brady Urology Foundation of Weill Medical College. He is a tenured professor of urology at the Icahn School of Medicine at Mount Sinai. In addition, Tewari directs a fellowship program in Robotic Prostatectomy and Prostate Cancer Outcomes that has conducted research comparing robotic surgery outcomes versus those of laparoscopic and open surgeries. Tewari is an Attending physician at the Mount Sinai Hospital in New York City.

=== Medical degree ===
Receiving his medical degree from Ganesh Shankar Vidyarthi Memorial Medical College (GSVM) in Kanpur city of Uttar Pradesh, India, Tewari graduated with honors in 1984 with 17 gold academic medals to credit. He received his training in urology from Sanjay Gandhi Post Graduate Institute of Medical Sciences (SGPGIMS) in India under the mentorship of Professor Mahendra Bhandari and completed the McH and DNB program in 1991.

=== Training ===
Tewari has trained in the U.S. at UCSF, University of Florida and at HFHS under Dr. Mani Menon, where was part of the surgical team that performed the first robotic procedure at VUI. Tewari completed his urology residency at the Vattikuti Urology Institute (VUI) of the Henry Ford Hospital in Detroit, Michigan, in 2004.

=== Research ===
Tewari's research interests revolve around the diagnosis and treatment of patients with urological cancers, with a focus on prostate cancer. His research ranges from the study of patient outcomes, robotic techniques, molecular markers for cancer aggressiveness, racial disparity in cancer biology, quality of life studies, strategies to improve nerve sparing and sexual function recovery, and anatomic studies to facilitate continence preservation to the development of next generation robotic techniques. He has received several federal and non-federal research funding grants for his research on prostate cancer, totaling several million dollars in grant capital. He is one of the few urologists in the world to receive an NIH R01 Grant. Additionally, he is among the first surgeons to use real time tissue imaging during surgery to minimize nerve damage in the patient and was the first surgeon in the world to use the catheter-less Prostate Surgery. The catheter-less surgery minimizes postoperative pain after prostatectomy.

== Professional activities ==
Tewari serves as a reviewer for a number of prestigious professional journals, including the Journal of Urology, British Journal of Urology, Contemporary Urology, Medscape, Post Graduate Medicine, and Oncology Operational. He is the associate editor for BJU International. Tewari has served as a visiting professor and lecturer at dozens of venues both in the United States and abroad. Recently, Tewari spoke at the Annual International Prostate & Robotics Symposium in the United Arab Emirates and the Ohio State World Symposium of Robotic Surgery. He is also previously been on faculty of the International Robotic Urology Symposium.

== Philanthropy ==
=== Covid-19 Relief in India ===
Tewari responded to the COVID-19 crisis in India by rallying together with his team at the Department of Urology, his charitable organization Global Prostate Cancer Research Foundation, and the Mount Sinai Health System leadership, to donate over 450 pallets with over $4 million worth of oxygen concentrators, ventilators, BiPap machines and PPE equipment. The life-supporting devices were shipped to Mumbai and distributed to hospitals across India.

The initiative, called Project Heal India, was supported by actor Anupam Kher along with Baba Kalyani, the chairman and managing director of Bharat Forge, who assisted in coordinating the distribution of the essential supplies in India.

=== Mount Sinai Robert F. Smith Mobile Prostate Cancer Screening Unit Program ===
The Mount Sinai Robert F. Smith Mobile Prostate Cancer Screening Unit Program was launched to support prostate health in Black communities through mobile screening appointments and follow-up visits with urologists at Mount Sinai Hospital. The project, funded through a grant by philanthropist Robert F. Smith, is in response to the higher incidence and mortality of prostate cancer in Black men. Expected to launch in 2021, the program, headed by Tewari, will partner with local communities and raise prostate cancer awareness.

== Personal life ==
Tewari is married to Mamta Tewari.

Tewari is the father to otolaryngologist, Apoorva Ramaswamy. Apoorva is married to Vivek Ramaswamy, the Republican nominee for the governor of Ohio.
