= Jacques Nasser =

American-Australian business executive

- Born: Jacques Albert Nasser; 12 December 1947 (age 78); Amyoun, Lebanon
- Education: Royal Melbourne Institute of Technology
- Occupations: Business executive, philanthropist
- Years active: 1968–present
- Board member of: Koç Holding; Altimetrik; Great Barrier Reef Foundation
- Awards: National Order of the Cedar; Ellis Island Medal of Honor; Order of Australia; Centenary Medal; Companion of the Order of Australia
- Website: JacNasser.com

Jacques Albert Nasser AC (Arabic: جاك نصر; born 12 December 1947) is a Lebanese Australian American business executive and philanthropist. Known for a management career at Ford Motor Company spanning several decades and continents, from 1999 to 2001 he served as Ford's CEO and president. He subsequently was a partner at One Equity Partners (JPMorgan), as well as on the boards of British Sky Broadcasting and Brambles. Also previously on the international advisory council of Allianz and Chairman of the Australian mining company BHP Billiton from 2010 to 2017, Smart Company named Nasser No. 6 on a 2012 list of the "most powerful people in Australian boardrooms."

Nasser is currently on the board of Koç Holding, and served on the board of Fox Corporation, as both lead independent director and chairman of the compensation committee for the latter. He is also currently on the advisory board of Altimetrik and on the chairman's panel of the Great Barrier Reef Foundation. Nasser, who funds a number of scholarship programs, is a member of both the National Order of the Cedar in Lebanon and the Order of Australia. Nasser was also awarded the Ellis Island Medal of Honor, which pays homage to contributions made to America by immigrants. In 2017 he was named a Companion of the Order of Australia.

== Early life and education ==
Jacques "Jac" A. Nasser was born in the city of Amioun, Lebanon on 27 December 1947. He is the son of a former bus driver and independent businessman, Abdo Nasser. At four years of age Nasser moved with his family to Melbourne, Australia. He attended Northcote High School. He started a number of businesses as a teenager, including a bicycle-making operation and several discotheques with his brother Jamie, which they promoted in Melbourne. He also has a sister, Betty. Nasser's first professional experience was at Ford Australia as a student intern. He graduated with a business degree from the Royal Melbourne Institute of Technology in Melbourne in 1968, where he would later be awarded an honorary doctorate of technology. He speaks four languages: English, Arabic, Spanish and Portuguese.

== Business career ==
=== Ford Motor Company ===
==== Early positions (1968–1997) ====
Upon graduating, in 1968 the 20-year-old Nasser joined Ford as a financial analyst, working at the head office in Australia. In 1973 he joined Ford's global financial staff and transferred to Ford's North American Truck Operations in the United States. Afterward, he returned to Australia to work as a manager of product programming and financial analysis, before joining Ford's International Automotive Operations. While with the international division, he helped oversee Asia-Pacific and Latin American operations. While working in Argentina, Nasser was notably kidnapped by political extremists, being returned to the Ford plant two days later.

Nasser helped in the negotiations of Ford's South African joint venture program in 1982. The following year, he developed a business and operating plan for Ford's Hermosillo Assembly Plant in Mexico. In 1987 Nasser became the first director and vice president of Autolatina, a joint venture between Ford and Volkswagen in Brazil and Argentina. While remaining in charge of Autolatina, in 1989 he also took charge of Ford Australia, where he had started his career. He remained president and CEO of Ford Australia until 1993, where he picked up the corporate nicknames "Jac the Knife" for cost-cutting efficiencies. He was also dubbed "Black Jack" for his ability to keep numbers north of red. On 1 January 1993, Nasser was elected chairman of the board of Ford Europe, a role he maintained until 1996. He was promoted to vice president of Ford Motor Company in 1993 as well, becoming Ford's group vice president of product development in 1994. While in his position of Ford's VP, Fortune writes that he developed a reputation for working 18-hour days and regularly interacting with Ford employees via a newsletter. Wrote Fortune about his time as VP, "if Ford is a religion, then Nasser is the head preacher." On 1 November 1996, he began heading Ford Automotive Operations. Nasser was the featured speaker at the 1998 New York International Auto Show (NYIAS).

==== CEO and diversification (1998-1999) ====
Bloomberg Businessweek described Nasser in late 1998 as a "scrappy, hard-nosed cost-cutter who is widely credited with Ford's turnaround," and Fortune in June 1998 described Nasser as "heir apparent" to Ford CEO Alex Trotman, who was soon to retire. The projected high-profile appointment met with a great deal of attention in the press, and largely positive reactions. On 1 January 1999, Nasser became president and CEO, as well as a member of the board of directors, of Ford Motor Company in Dearborn, Michigan. During Nasser's time, Ford was the world's most profitable automaker, with profits of $7.2 billion on sales of $163 billion, so he was given free rein to experiment by the simultaneously appointed chairman Bill Ford. Nasser announced that he would transform Ford, according to The Economist, into a "consumer-products and services company". He stated he would work to help Ford surpass GM in US market share, and would also try to make Ford less reliant on pickup truck sales and expand into markets including electric, connected vehicles.

Nasser promptly instituted a number of changes as CEO, closing plants that were losing money and selling unprofitable operations. He also instituted a new human resources policy mandating that 10 percent of low-performing managers could be subject to termination, arguing that new people and turnover were good for the company. He also instituted a program that gave internet access and home computers to employees. Beyond human resources, Nasser's other focus was brand management, and under Nasser's watch, in 1999 Ford formed Premier Automotive Group (PAG) to expand its market share in the luxury segment. PAG was formed to oversee the business operations of Ford's high-end automotive marques, and it grew to include responsibility for the Lincoln, Mercury, Aston Martin, Jaguar, Land Rover and Volvo brands. To reinvigorate certain brand lines, Nasser brought in car designer J Mays. He also oversaw Ford's 1999 acquisition of Volvo, Land Rover, and helped Ford start an "automotive e-business integrated supply chain."

He diversified Ford's businesses to include e-commerce, junkyards, auto-repair shops, and car distribution among others. By August 1999, The Economist clarified that Nasser had already acquired the Kwik Fit exhausts-and-brakes chain in Europe, American scrapyard businesses, the consumer-finance arm of Japan's Mazda, and had "even signed a deal to provide drivers with satellite-fed audio and other services for a monthly fee." The Economist pointed out the diversification was an attempt to increase profit margins, as "whereas car makers are lucky to scrape operating margins of more than 5% from actually making cars, other businesses such as leasing, renting, insurance, finance and car repair, can all achieve margins of 10-15%." Also, by late 1999 Nasser was working to sell the under-performing in-house parts company, Visteon. Ford of North America began marketing the Ford Focus in October 1999 for the 2000 model year as a surprise Christmas present for Nasser, with some changes from the European version. Ford's profits in 1999 were US$6.5 billion ($A9.94 billion), which Drive.com claims was the largest "ever made in the world car industry."

==== Disputes and Firestone (2000–2001) ====
According to CNN, Nasser was "point man" in the dispute between Ford and Bridgestone/Firestone Inc. over tire safety. After an investigation in early 2000 found that tread separation on Firestone tires had led to fatalities in some Ford Explorers, Nasser appeared on prime-time television to announce a product recall allowing Ford owners to change the affected tires for others. Firestone responded by arguing that Ford Explorers had caused the accidents, not its tires, while Nasser defended the Explorer as one of the safer SUVs on the market. On 6 September 2000, Nasser and Bridgestone executive Masatoshi Ono confronted a US Congressional sub-committee on the recall. Dispute arose in the hearings over whether Ford and Firestone had known about similar problems in the 1970s and 1990s. Nasser again denied that Ford had responsibility in the accidents, with Ono admitting some fault. On 22 May 2001, Bridgestone's CEO wrote to Nasser canceling the 100-year supply relationship between their companies, arguing Ford's tire recall was "casting doubt on the quality of Firestone tires." After numerous class action lawsuits, Firestone ultimately recalled millions of tires later that year, with Ford Motor using AUS$4.4 billion of its own funds to replace Firestone tires on its vehicles. The scandal helped lead to a sharp dip in Ford's 2001 quarterly share prices.

By late 2001, Nasser's efforts to diversify Ford's core business had met with mixed reactions in the press, with analysts at The Economist and CNN arguing that diversification and recent recalls had hampered productivity. Nasser's manager evaluation system had also proved controversial at Ford, with allegations of reverse discrimination. In July 2001, Nasser announced that the system was being changed to "allow for more flexibility." Ford settled several lawsuits over the system in late 2001 without admitting liability. In October 2001, Nasser retired from his position as Ford's CEO. He was succeeded in both positions by William Clay Ford Jr, who as Henry Ford's great-grandson had previously been chairman and president.

=== Sky and One Equity Partners (2001–2010s) ===
In February 2001, Nasser became a member of the International Advisory Council of Allianz Aktiengeselischaft, a role he would maintain until 2017. In 2002 he became a senior partner at One Equity Partners, the private equity arm of JPMorgan Chase. While with One Equity, he served as chairman of One Equity's Polaroid Corporation subsidiary starting in July 2002, before selling the company in 2005. Nasser was also involved when One Equity speculated on bidding for Jaguar Cars and Premier Automotive Group in 2006. He remained a One Equity partner until 2014, and from 2013 until 2019 he was an advisor to One Equity Partners LLP. Nasser was on the board of British Sky Broadcasting from November 2002 to November 2012 and he served on the board of BuyTV.com. In 2004, he began a four-year tenure on the board of directors at Brambles.

=== BHP Billiton chairman (2010–2016) ===
In June 2006 he was appointed to the board the Australian mining company BHP Billiton. He was elected chairman of BHP Billiton in March 2010, ending an 18-month search to find a replacement for the retiring Don Argus. The Wall Street Journal claimed that "analysts welcomed the appointment," and that Nasser had possibly been selected because BHP was "looking for the stability of another long-term chairman." He officially became chairman of BHP Billiton on 13 March 2010. Over the following years Nasser would help implement a number of policy changes at BHP, including a large de-merger. Nasser also focused on maintaining the company's long-term financial goals, working to keep the balance sheet stable during a global downturn in the metals and oil markets, and revising the company's progressive annual dividend policy, which the Australian Financial Review dubbed strategic for the "new era."

On 5 December 2012, Smart Company named Nasser No. 6 on a list of the "most powerful people in Australian boardrooms." Nasser became a board member at 21st Century Fox in 2013, and in 2015, Nasser joined the board of Koç Holding, a large Turkey-based conglomerate.

At the height of the fracking boom in 2011, Nasser had overseen a $20 billion investment in US shale oil and gas. Afterwards, a fall in oil prices led to "pre-tax writedowns of about $13 billion on the [US] business." Within six years BHP considered exiting its US shale gas assets, with Nasser stating publicly that although "we bought exactly what we thought we were buying [in the US]," the timing had been off. After the deadly Bento Rodrigues dam disaster in Brazil on 5 November 2015, Nasser announced that BHP would be permitting an external investigation into the incident, with findings to be released publicly. In October 2016, he announced he planned to step down as chairman in 2017, and would be overseeing the board during the selection of a successor. In June 2017, BHP announced that BHP board member Ken MacKenzie had been selected to succeed Nasser as chairman effective on 1 September 2017. Nasser retired as a director and chairman of BHP.

=== Recent positions (2017–2024) ===
As a 21st Century Fox director, among other high-profile issues, in April 2017 Nasser took part in closed board meetings to decide if Fox News presenter Bill O'Reilly would be fired over sexual harassment settlements reported in the press.

Since 2015, he is a board member of the largest Turkish conglomerate Koc Holding, which is a long time Ford partner through its subsidiary Ford Otosan.

In 2018, Nasser backed the Australian financial-advice software company Ignition Advice. In March 2019, when 21st Century Fox sold assets to Disney and formed Fox Corporation, Nasser was announced as one of the new company's board members. Nasser was also elected Lead Independent Director, chairman of the compensation committee, and a member of the audit committee. Fox Corporation's assets at the time of the spinoff included Fox News Channel, Fox Business Network, the Fox Sports channels FS1 and FS2, Fox Broadcasting, and various television stations. As of 2021, Nasser was a member of the four-person advisory board of Altimetrik. He was also on the chairman's panel of the Great Barrier Reef Foundation.

== Honors and philanthropy ==
Nasser was named 'Automobile Industries Man of the Year' in 1999 by the Retail Motor Industry Organization. In 2002 he was named an officer of the National Order of the Cedar, the highest honour in Lebanon. Also that year, as part of the 2002 Australia Day Honours Nasser was appointed an Officer of the Order of Australia and received the Centenary Medal for "his contribution to Australian industry, as an Advisor to Government, and for education in the areas of technology." The National Ethnic Coalition of Organizations (NECO) awarded Nasser the Ellis Island Medal of Honor, which pays homage to contributions made to America by immigrants. At the 2017 Queen's Birthday Honours in Australia he was named a Companion of the Order of Australia for his "leadership in the mining sector, development of sustainable policies and philanthropy."

Nasser funds several scholarship programs that assist individual students, including the Jacques Nasser Scholarship in Entrepreneurship at RMIT University in Melbourne, the Jacques Nasser Scholarship for MBA students at the American University of Beirut, and the Jacques Nasser Scholarship at the INSEAD School of Business in France. He also founded the Jacques Nasser Rural and Regional Scholarship at RMIT University and has supported organizations such as Focus: HOPE, a training centre in Detroit. Nasser created the Jacques Nasser Scholarship Fund in 2004, which provides needs-based scholarships to RMIT students for "global entrepreneurship travel experiences." In 2021 he then started the Jacques Nasser Fund for Innovation, which funds startups which use technology in ways that "drive positive social impact."

== Personal life ==
Nasser and his ex-wife Jennifer, also an Australian, married in 1970 and have four children together. By 2009 Nasser was based primarily out of his home in Michigan, though after becoming chairman of BHP Billiton in 2010 he began spending equal time in Australia, also having properties in New York City, London, and Melbourne. He has Australian-American dual citizenship and is nicknamed "Jac". Described as a fan of racing, Nasser has served as a periodic judge at Concours d'Elegance events. He owns a 1961 Lincoln Continental.

== See also ==
- List of leaders of Ford Motor Company
- List of alumni and faculty of the Royal Melbourne Institute of Technology
- List of Lebanese Australians / Australian Americans / Lebanese Americans
- List of Lebanese people / in Australia / by net worth

Business positions
Preceded by Alex Trotman	Chief executive officer of the Ford Motor Company; 1999–2001	Succeeded by William Clay Ford, Jr.
