= Ford Taurus (third generation) =

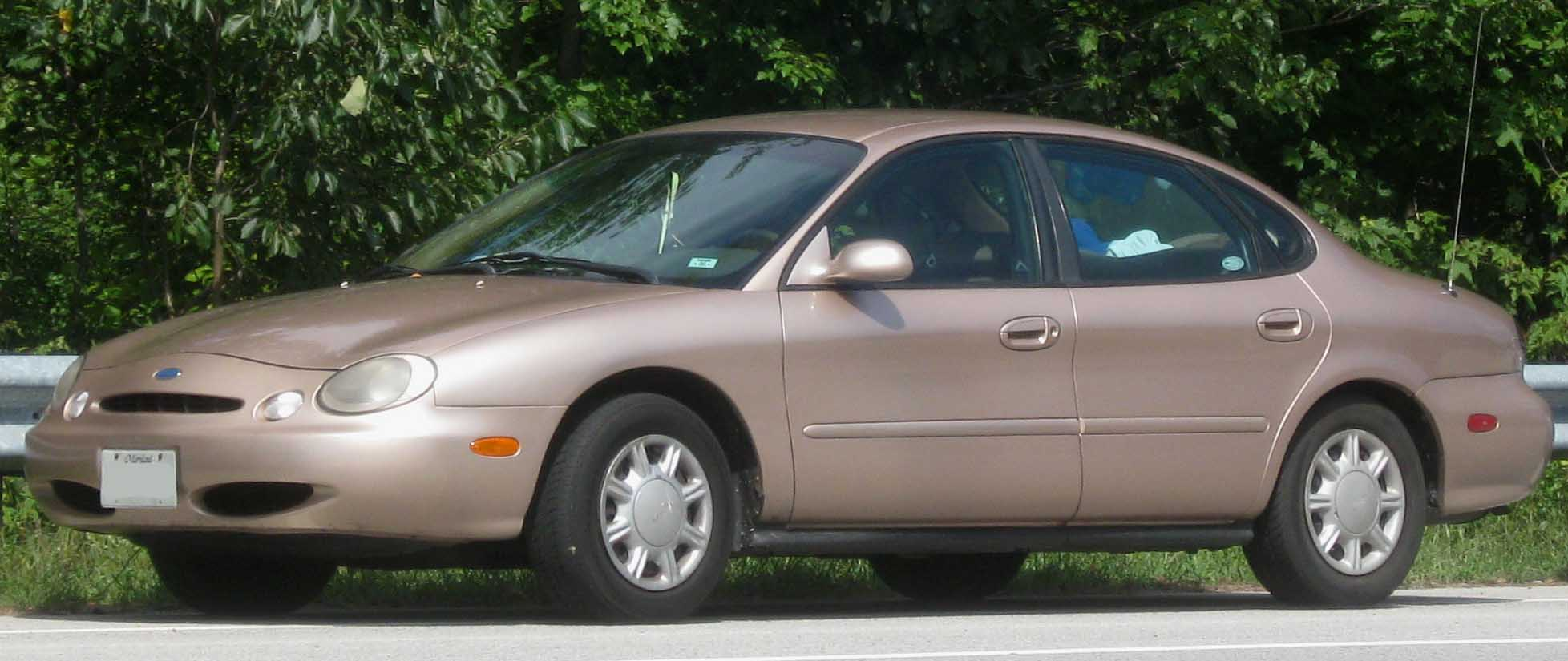

Overview
- Manufacturer: Ford
- Production: June 19, 1995 – September 1999
- Model years: 1996–1999
- Assembly: Atlanta Assembly, Hapeville, Georgia, U.S. Chicago Assembly, Chicago, Illinois, U.S.
- Designer: Doug Gaffka (1991, 1992)

Body and chassis
- Class: Mid-size car
- Body style: 4-door sedan 5-door station wagon
- Layout: FF layout
- Platform: Ford DN101 platform
- Related: Mercury Sable; Ford Taurus SHO; Lincoln Continental; Ford Windstar

Powertrain
- Engine: 3.0 L Vulcan SFI V6; 3.0 L Duratec 30 DOHC V6; 3.4 L Yamaha SHO DOHC V8
- Transmission: 4-speed AX4N automatic 4-speed AX4S automatic

Dimensions
- Wheelbase: 108.5 in (2,756 mm)
- Length: Sedan: 197.5 in (5,016 mm); Station wagon: 199.6 in (5,070 mm)
- Width: 73.0 in (1,854 mm)
- Height: Sedan: 55.1 in (1,400 mm); Station wagon: 57.6 in (1,463 mm)

Chronology
- Predecessor: Ford Taurus (second generation)
- Successor: Ford Taurus (fourth generation)

The third-generation Ford Taurus is an automobile that was marketed by Ford for the 1996 to 1999 model years, having entered production in June 1995. While the chassis underpinnings were largely carried over, the redesign gave the Taurus its first complete exterior redesign since its 1986 introduction. As a mid-size car it slotted between the compact Ford Contour and full-size Ford Crown Victoria in Ford's North American model range. The third-generation Taurus was again offered as a four-door sedan and as a five-door station wagon, marketed alongside the Mercury Sable.

In contrast to the evolutionary 1992 update of the second generation, the third generation sought to recreate the class-leading design introduced by the 1986 Taurus, also in response to the 1992 introduction of the Chrysler LH cars. Following the 1986 introduction of the Taurus, the model line had gained two significant competitors — the Toyota Camry and Honda Accord (the latter of which, the Taurus had overtaken as best-selling car in the United States) alongside traditional GM and Chrysler-brand competition. The first Ford to combine round headlights with composite-style housings, the third-generation Taurus adopted oval shapes for multiple design elements of the exterior and interior, including the grille openings, taillamps, the rear window (for the Taurus sedan and Taurus/Sable station wagons), and side window openings for the Taurus/Sable.

The model line was released for sale in late 1995; in contrast to the near-universal acceptance of the first-generation Taurus, the third-generation Taurus received mixed reactions from consumers. For the 1996 model year, the Taurus remained the best-selling car in the United States; however, only 49% of the model line were sold to retail customers, with the rest nearly entirely supported through fleet sales. For 1997, the more conservatively redesigned Toyota Camry overtook the Taurus as the best-selling car in the United States (a position it has held ever since).

The third-generation Taurus was assembled by Ford at its Atlanta Assembly (Hapeville, Georgia) and Chicago Assembly (Chicago, Illinois) facilities.

== Development ==
Development for the third-generation Taurus began in 1991, and its designers and engineers believed that they were faced with a daunting task; they compared completely redesigning the Taurus to repainting the Mona Lisa. Like the first-generation Taurus, the new Taurus was developed by a team effort, in which the exterior and interior designers, engineers, and marketing staff had input on the new car.

Many designs were considered during the development process, from designs that resembled the second generation cars, to more radically styled cars. They eventually decided on a radical new styling scheme based upon oval derived design elements in April 1992 (final approval), which would prove to be the car's Achilles heel in the marketplace. Chief designer Jack Telnack, who oversaw the development of the first and second generation Taurus, said that his Taurus was designed the way it was to stand out in the marketplace, and that the use of the oval was becoming the new global design theme for Ford.

Breaking down and testing competing cars, as well as listening to customer input played a large part in the development of the third-generation Taurus, just like it did during the development of the first generation. Many competing cars were broken down and extensively tested in order for the Taurus to be designed to be superior to them in terms of comfort, performance, and refinement. Most notably, the Toyota Camry and Honda Accord were extensively tested, and the Taurus' suspension was designed to emulate these cars' ride and handling techniques. Customer input played a large part into the design of the third generation Taurus' interior.

The dashboard's design originated from a large number of complaints from customers that the previous Taurus' radio and climate control modules were cluttered with many small and similar feeling buttons, as well as small graphics, which caused the driver to have to look away from the road to be able to operate them properly. As a result, a large portion of the third generation's dash was devoted to the radio and climate control, with each button on these modules containing a unique design, making it easier for the driver to operate the radio and climate control without taking their eyes off the road. This would eventually lead to the creation of the Integrated Control Panel.

Making the new Taurus pleasing to the senses was a recurring theme throughout the third-generation Taurus' development. Ford's engineers specially tuned every panel and component, so that every sound that the Taurus made, from the doors closing to the engine running, was acoustically pleasing. Ford's trim designers specially selected every one of the Taurus' interior materials, so that every surface, as well as every button and control, was pleasing to the touch.

=== Reception ===
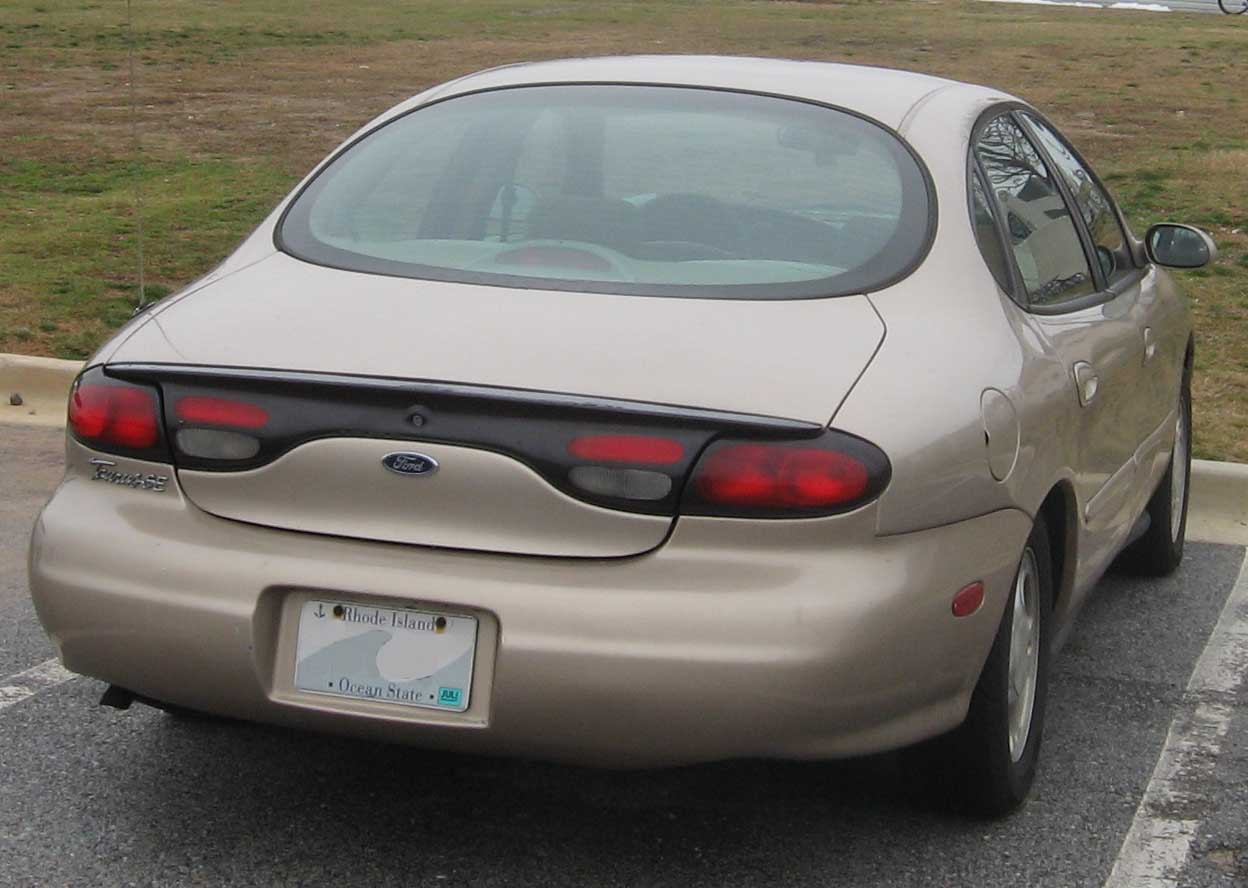
Controversial oval rear window

The third-generation Taurus and Sable sedans were unveiled at the Cobo Center during the 1995 North American International Auto Show in Detroit, and garnered more attention from journalists and publications than any other car at the show. The wagon was unveiled on February 9, 1995 at the Chicago Auto Show, and garnered similar amounts of attention. After their respective unveilings, both vehicles became among the most anticipated new cars of the 1996 model year, similar to the first generation Taurus.

The first third-generation Taurus was built on July 12, 1995 at the Chicago Assembly Plant. Ford Chairman Alexander Trotman, who took part in the ceremonies, was joined by state and local politicians and union and plant officials in dipping their hands in yellow paint to "autograph" the hood of the first Taurus off the line. The hood is earmarked for permanent display at the plant. The Taurus was released to showrooms on September 24 of that year, and sales began a week later on October 1. The Taurus was released almost a week later than the Sable, as Ford designers consulted a $500 Sherman Oaks, California astrologer to figure out the best solstice date to release the car.

Reception to the new Taurus by automotive publications was generally positive. Road & Track gave the Taurus a good review upon its release, and found its handling and refinement impressive. Motor Trend also gave the Taurus a positive review, although they found the oval styling awkward at first glance. Despite this, they found it to have many redeeming qualities. However, unlike the first-generation Taurus, it fell short of their Car of the Year award, which was instead awarded to the redesigned 1996 Dodge Caravan.

Consumer reaction was mixed, however. Detractors of the new design pejoratively refer to this generation as the "Bubble" Taurus or "Submarine" Taurus based on the window shaping and broad curves used in the front end being seen as a negative. Ford had hoped the radical redesign would lead to the same success it had with the 1986 Taurus, and went as far as predicting that the new Taurus would continue the outgoing model's record of selling over 400,000 units a year. Sales were somewhat slow at first, prompting Ford to add a low priced "G" model mid-year 1996. Ford also offered incentives such as a six-month lease for Toyota Camry and Honda Accord owners, a $250 Cash Allowance on lease renewals, and a $50 dinner certificate for test driving the vehicle. It managed to keep its position as the best selling car in the United States in 1996, although this was because of heavy sales to rental fleets, which comprised 51% of all Taurus sales for that year. This is opposed to the Toyota Camry, of which the bulk of its sales were through retail outlets to individual customers. In 1997, the Taurus lost its bestselling title, as it slipped to #3 behind a redesigned Toyota Camry and the Honda Accord.

== Overview ==
=== Exterior ===
The exterior of the third-generation Taurus was completely redesigned for 1996. It used a controversial new shape that chief designer Jack Telnack claimed was penned to make the Taurus stand out to sedan buyers, and compared the current Taurus to the likeness of a pair of slippers. This shape was based upon that of an oval, which was perhaps inspired by that of Ford's own logo, and while the previous Taurus used a flat, streamlined shape, this Taurus used a rounded shape similar to that of the Chrysler Concorde. The heavily-contoured sides took their cue from the Lincoln Mark VIII. Station wagons also got new sheet metal, although from the firewall back, the Taurus and Mercury Sable wagons again shared the same panels, with all station wagon doors being the same as those used on the Sable sedans. As the new-generation Taurus was aimed at a more mature, affluent customer base, its exterior contained many upscale styling touches. For example, the LX came with chrome alloy wheels, chrome dual exhaust tips, and the "Taurus" badge on the back was written in script, as opposed to the block letters used in previous generations.

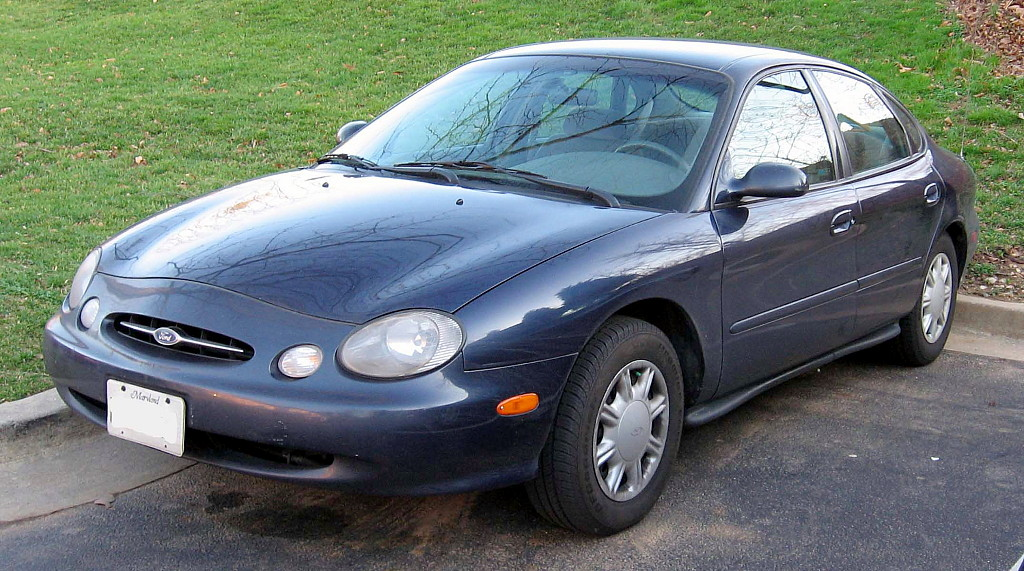
1998–1999 Taurus sedan

In 1998, the exterior of the Taurus received a slight redesign to make the shape more mainstream, in order to appeal to a wider customer base. The front bumper was redesigned to have a full-length opening, as well as moving the Ford logo down onto a chrome bar mounted in the grille, similar to that of the third-generation Taurus SHO. These years were also fitted with different front turn signal lenses, featuring completely clear lenses and a multi-reflector surface in the rear of the housing, around the bulb. The rear turn signal lenses were also changed from amber to red, to match the rest of the lightbar assembly.

=== Interior ===
The interior was also completely redesigned for the 1996 model year. Like that of the previous two generations, the interior was designed to be user-friendly. The gauges were placed in an oval pod while the dashboard wrapped slightly around the driver; all of the main controls were placed within easy reach, and were designed to be recognizable by touch and to be operated by drivers without taking their eyes off the road. The controls for the radio and climate control (some of which, like the preset buttons, were oval shaped) were combined into an oval-shaped "Integrated Control Panel" mounted in the center of the dash, which was created in response to many complaints from Taurus owners that they could not easily operate the main controls of the radios and climate control systems without taking their eyes off the road. The "Integrated Control Panel" either came with a manual climate controls, or automatic climate controls. Gone was wide and couch-like front row bench seating of previous generations.

Another innovation was the "Flip-Fold" center console on cars not equipped with a standard floor console. It was a seat in between the bucket seats that could be transformed into a console, reducing the seating count by one. The seat cushion folded out into a console with a lockable storage bin and cupholders, resting against the dashboard. The seatback also folded down to become an armrest. A traditional center console with a floor-mounted shifter was installed on cars equipped without the flip fold console.

This generation's interior was not as configurable as that of the first two generations. The G and GL models (see below) were only available with steering column-mounted shifter, along with a cloth front bench seat and the "Flip-Fold" center console. The LX, on the other hand, came standard with bucket seats that could be ordered with either cloth or leather upholstery, along with a center console and floor-mounted shifter. However, a column-mounted shifter and a cloth front bench was available as a no-cost option. In 1999, the interior was again available in three configurations, like that of the first-generation Taurus; a front bench seat with a column-mounted shifter, front bucket seats with a center console and floor-mounted shifter, or front bucket seats with a center console and a column-mounted shifter. Each configuration was offered in both Taurus models (see below).

The Ford Taurus has many seating options, ranging from five people to eight people. On wagons and sedans equipped with the floor mounted shifter, it seated five people standard, and wagons could seat up to seven people, with a bench in the third row. Also, models equipped with the flip fold console could seat either six or eight people, depending on whether the wagons had a third row bench or not. The sedans could seat a maximum of six people with the flip fold console, and five people with a regular console.

=== Models and engines ===
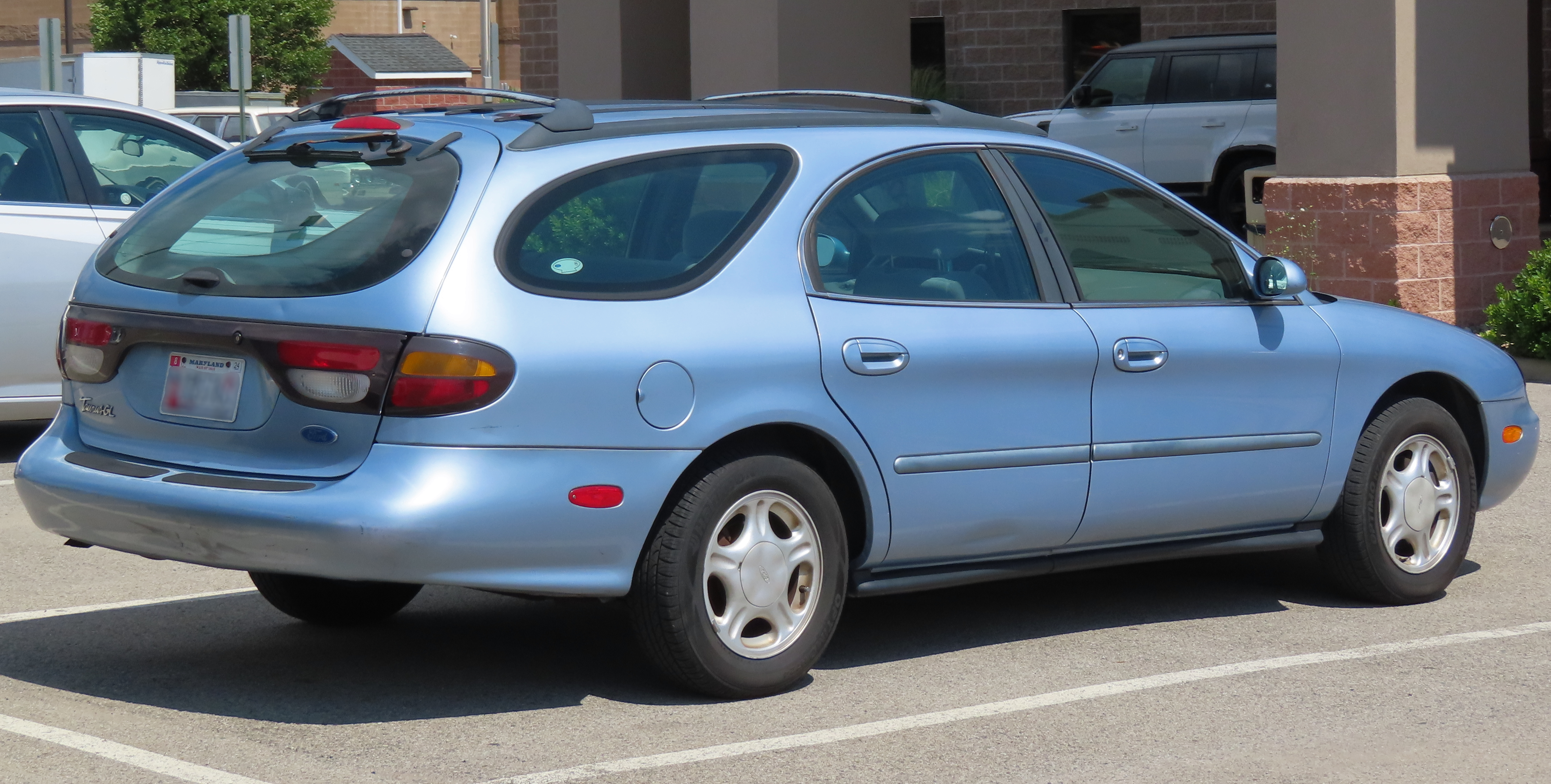
Taurus wagon

At its launch, the Taurus was available in two models, the GL, which was the entry level/value model, and the LX, which was the top-of-the-line model. The GL was basic and did not have many optional features, while the LX came with many standard features and was highly configurable.

To close the price gap between the Taurus and the Ford Contour, as well as to increase sales, an entry-level G model was added midway into the 1996 model year, as essentially a slightly de-contented GL. For the 1998 model year, the models of Taurus were completely changed. The G and GL were dropped, and the LX became the entry-level/value model. The SE model from 1995 was revived, and it became the top-tier model. The SE was offered with two special packages; the Comfort package which added chrome wheels carried over from the LX, automatic climate control, the Duratec engine V6 (see below), and bucket seats with a center console and a floor-mounted shifter, or the Sport package, which contained all of the features in the comfort package, but substituted the chrome wheels for five-spoke alloy wheels.

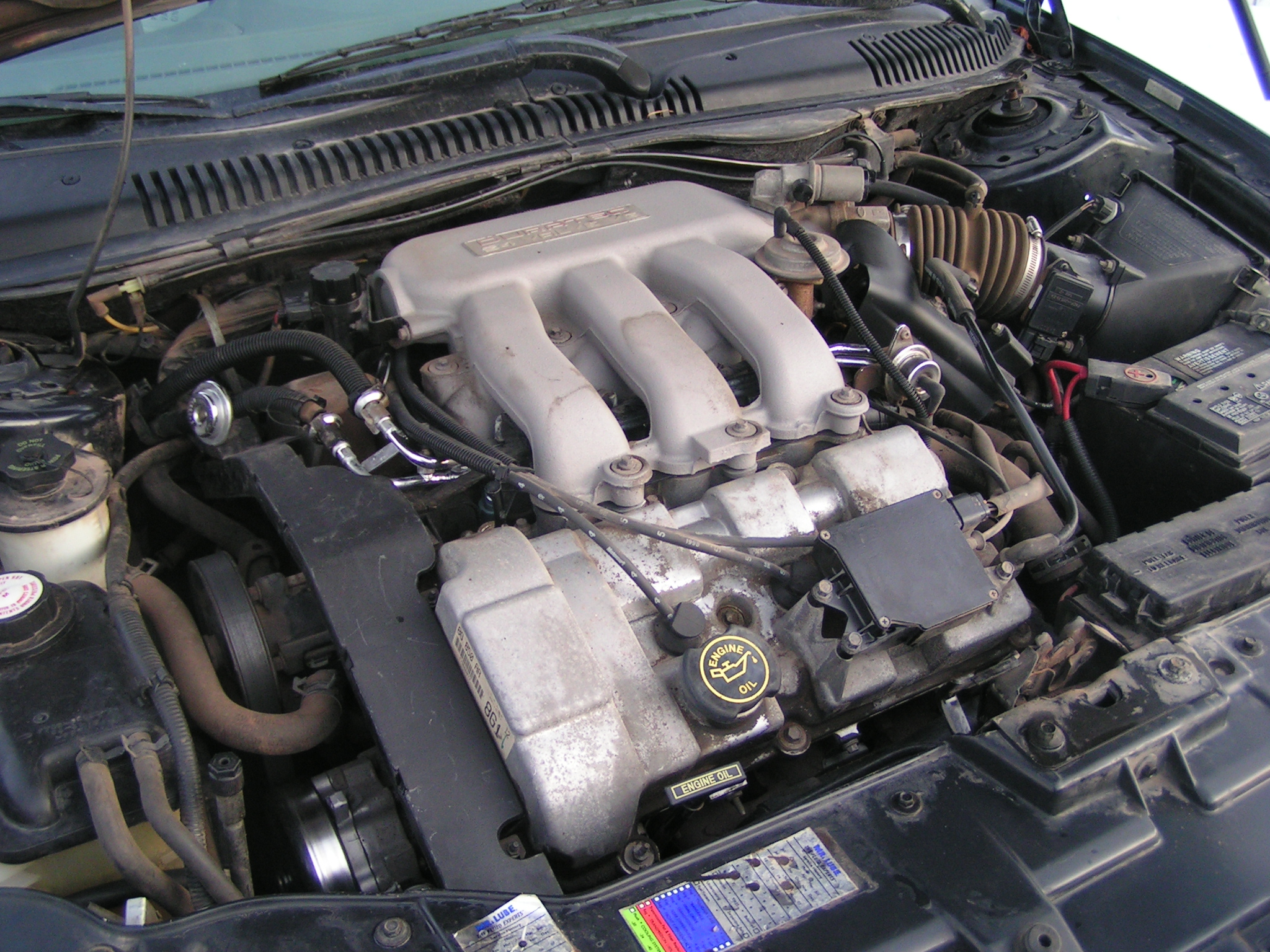
A 3.0L DOHC Duratec V6 engine in a 1998 Ford Taurus

The 1996 model year was the first time that the Taurus did not have an optional engine. The base G and GL had the 3.0 L Vulcan V6, which was a carryover from the previous model. The top-of-the-line LX, however, got the new 3.0 L DOHC Duratec 30 V6, which produced 200 hp (150 kW) and was developed specifically for this model. When Ford rearranged the Taurus models for 1998, the Vulcan became the standard engine, and the Duratec became optional on all models. However, it was only available on the SE for 1999. Vulcan-equipped models came with the four-speed AX4S automatic transmission, while Duratec equipped models got the four-speed AX4N transmission. However, some Vulcan-equipped models randomly received the AX4N transmission for no apparent reason. Ford also deleted some features for the 1999 model year, in order to lower the price about one thousand dollars, and possibly boost sales. Some deleted features included the floor courtesy lamps and glove compartment lamp.

== Variants ==
=== Mercury Sable ===
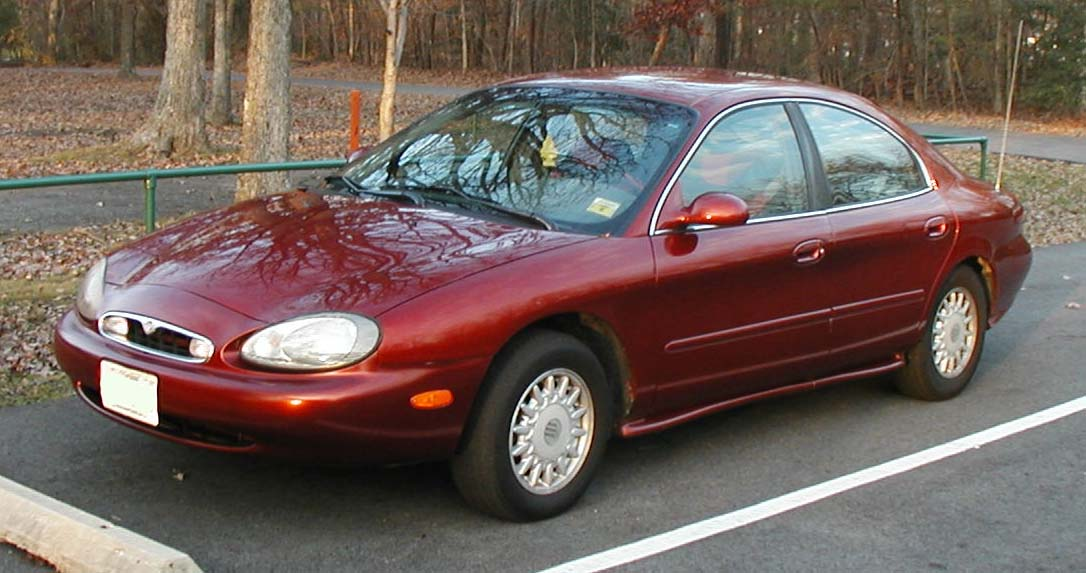
Third-generation Mercury Sable GS

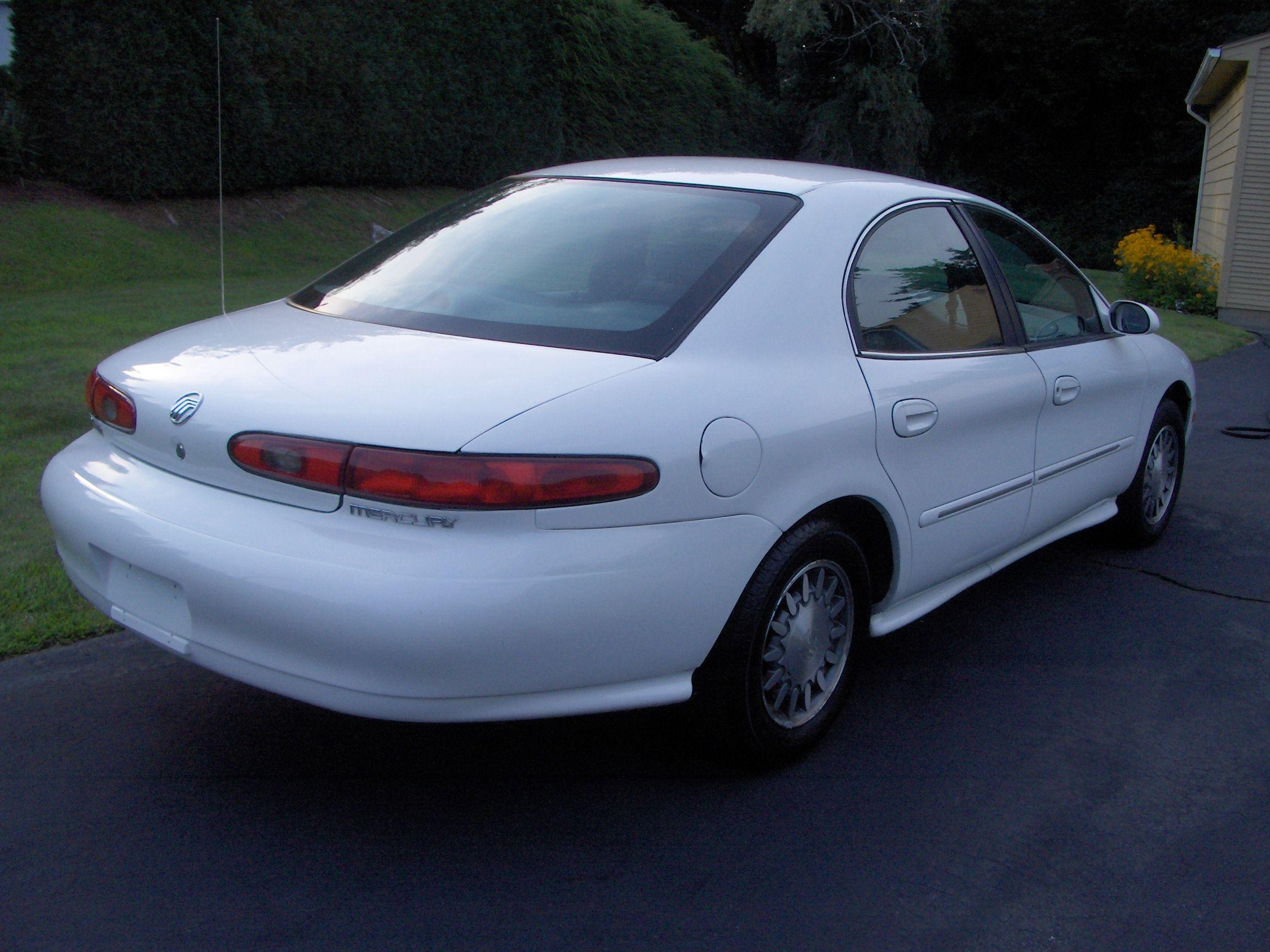
Third-generation Mercury Sable

The Mercury Sable, a sister model of the Taurus aimed at a more upscale audience, was also redesigned for the 1996 model year. As with previous generations, the Sable used the same mechanical parts as the Taurus with a unique body. However, the 1996 Sable ditched the unique styling cues of the previous generations, specifically the front light bar, wrap-around rear glass and skirted rear fender, in favor of a design theme that more closely resembled that of the Taurus. For the first time, the Sable did not get a unique interior design, instead sharing all of its interior components with the Taurus with the exception of branded parts and unique woodgrain trim. Trim levels were carried over from the previous generation: A base model GS and high-end LS, with a base G model briefly offered during the second half of the 1996 model year. The Sable had the same powertrains and most features as the Taurus, though no counterpart to the high performance SHO was offered. Prices increased, corresponding with the increase in price of the Taurus. While the design of the Taurus was polarizing, the more conservative design of the Sable was praised; Automobile Magazine selected the Sable as its 1996 design of the year. Unlike the Taurus, sales of the Sable stayed steady with the previous model, and styling revisions for 1998 were limited to a new grille and headlamps. The Taurus and Sable were produced concurrently through the 1999 model year.

=== Ford Taurus SHO ===
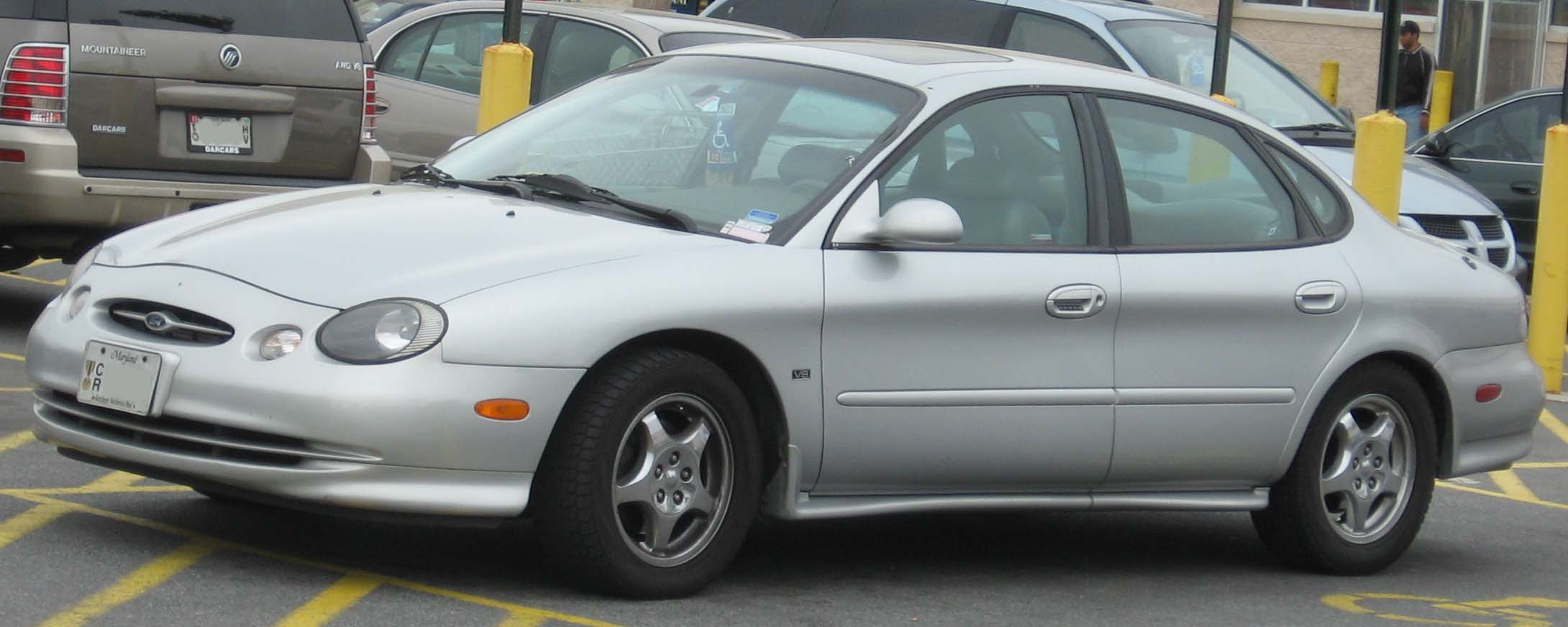
Third-generation Ford Taurus SHO

As with the Taurus, a new model of Taurus SHO was launched for 1996. Although it contained less aggressive styling than its predecessors, it still differed from the normal Taurus with different seats, wheels, bumpers, drivetrain, as well as a fin being put on the driver's side windshield wiper, to keep it on the windshield at high speeds. A 235 hp (175 kW) aluminum 3.4 L V8 engine with heads from Yamaha and block from Cosworth was specified for the SHO model, but it was given the same 4-speed transmission as the LX: the manual gearbox option was no longer offered on the SHO. This was partly because this model of SHO was designed for comfort instead of performance.

This model of SHO gained a reputation of being trouble-prone due to a large number of engine failures at around the 50,000-mile mark due to separation of the camshaft from its sprocket. However, this problem can be rectified by having the camshafts welded. Possibly because of this, this generation of SHO sold substantially worse than its predecessor, with sales peaking at 9,000 in 1997. As a result, the SHO was discontinued outright after the 1999 model year.

=== Export models ===
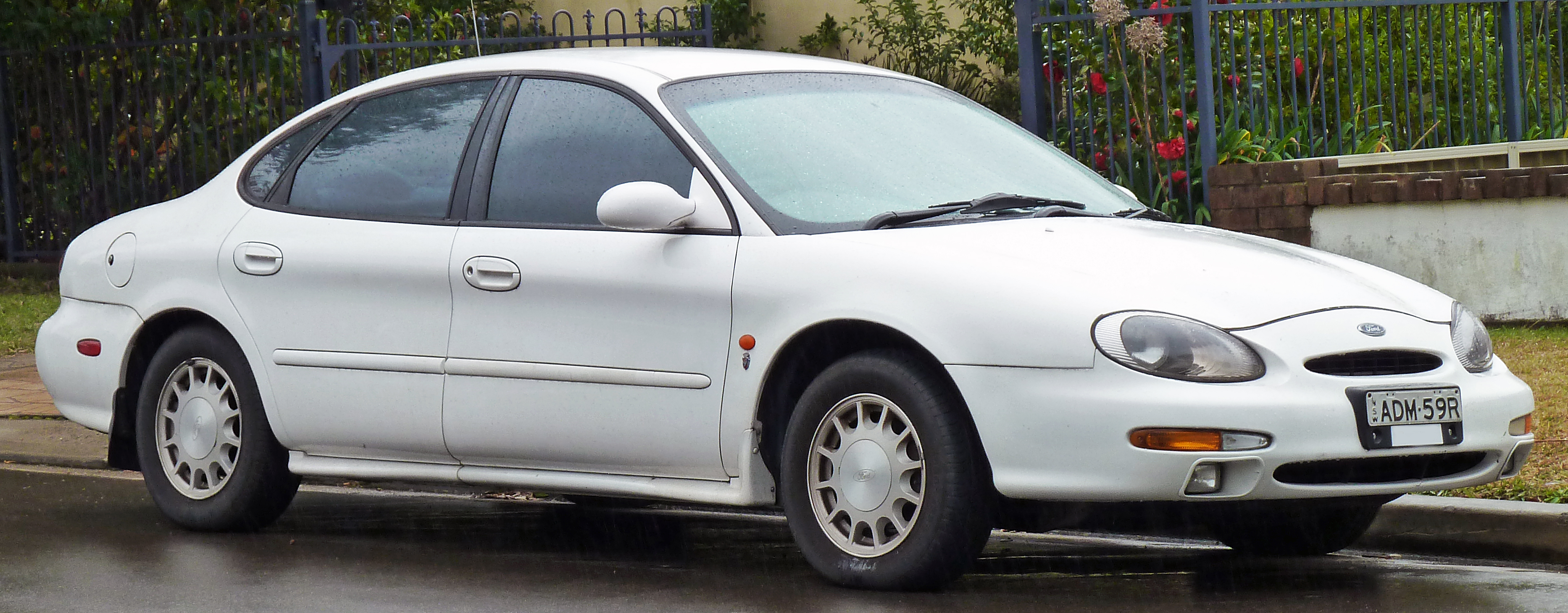
1996–1998 Ford Taurus Ghia sedan (Australia)

In addition to being sold in the North American market, third-generation models were exported to many other countries, in left and right-hand drive configurations. However, this action proved unsuccessful. Export models wore Mercury Sable headlamps and a unique front bumper cover to conform to these countries' regulations regarding automotive lighting. Right-hand-drive versions used a hand-operated parking brake in the center console instead of a foot-operated parking brake as in North America. The Taurus was poorly received in Australia due to its high price; a well-equipped, larger-engined, rear-wheel drive Ford Fairmont cost around the same amount. Australian buyers could only opt for a single-spec sedan, known as the Taurus Ghia. However, in New Zealand the Taurus was reasonably popular. While Australia only saw the sedan model, both the sedan and station wagon models were available in New Zealand.

Launched while Japan was in a recession following the 1991 collapse of the Japanese asset price bubble, this generation Taurus was exported to Japan in limited numbers, and sold at Japanese auto dealerships called Autorama (a joint venture with Mazda), where the sedan and wagon versions with right-hand driving positions were available until 1997. To Japanese buyers, it was regarded as a luxury vehicle as the exterior dimensions and engine displacement exceeded Japanese Government compact car regulations, and buyers in Japan were liable for additional taxes. The engine displacement also put operating costs for Japanese owners in a higher annual road tax obligation.

== Replacement ==
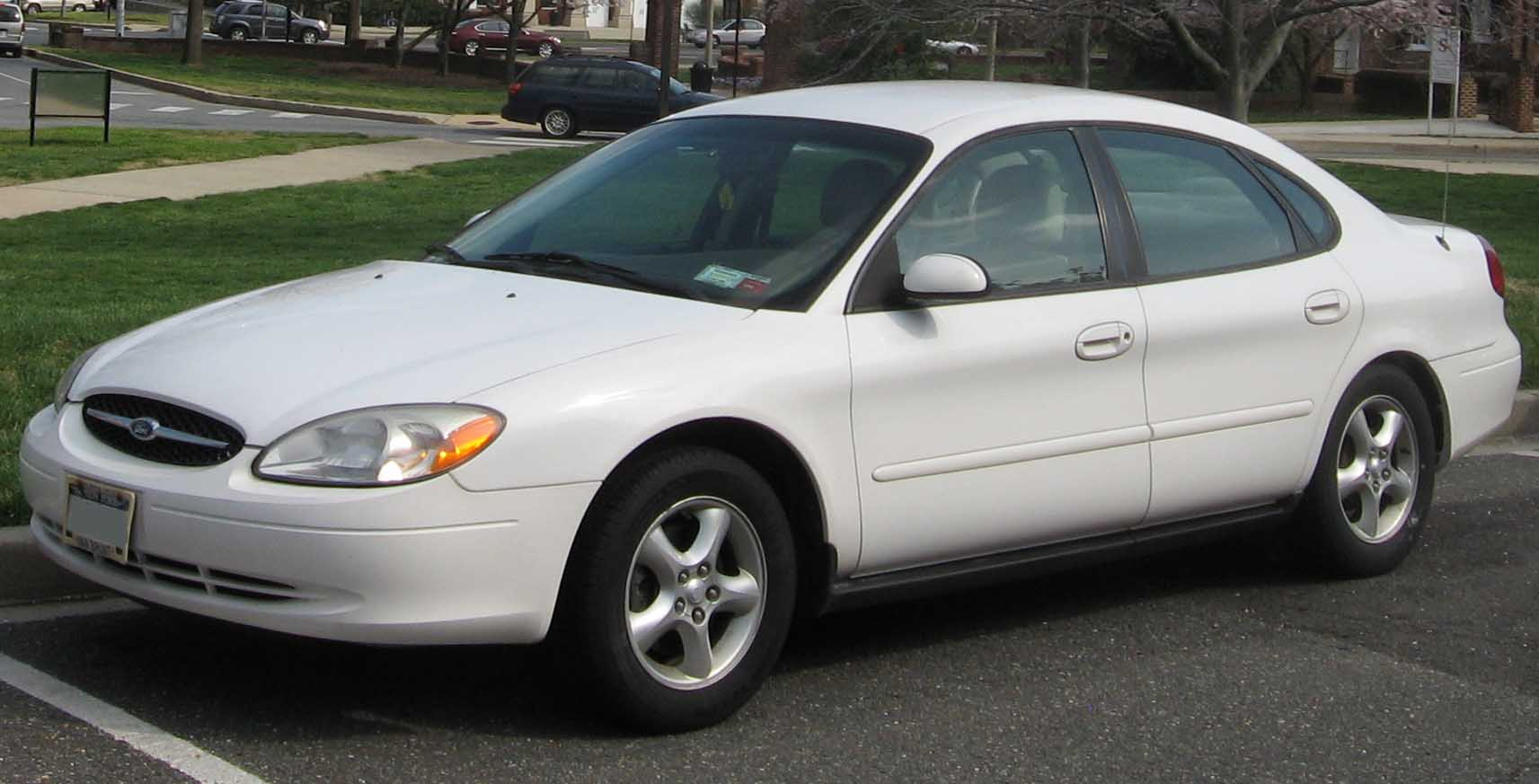
Fourth-generation Ford Taurus front view

In 1999, Ford launched the fourth-generation Ford Taurus to replace the third generation. Although the doors and mechanical parts were carried over, this generation was designed with a more conservative design in hopes of increasing its appeal to customers. This new shape contained a more upright trunk and rear roof panel, of which increased headroom and trunk space substantially. This generation also contained a redesigned interior that sported a more conservative look, while retaining many features offered in the third generation.

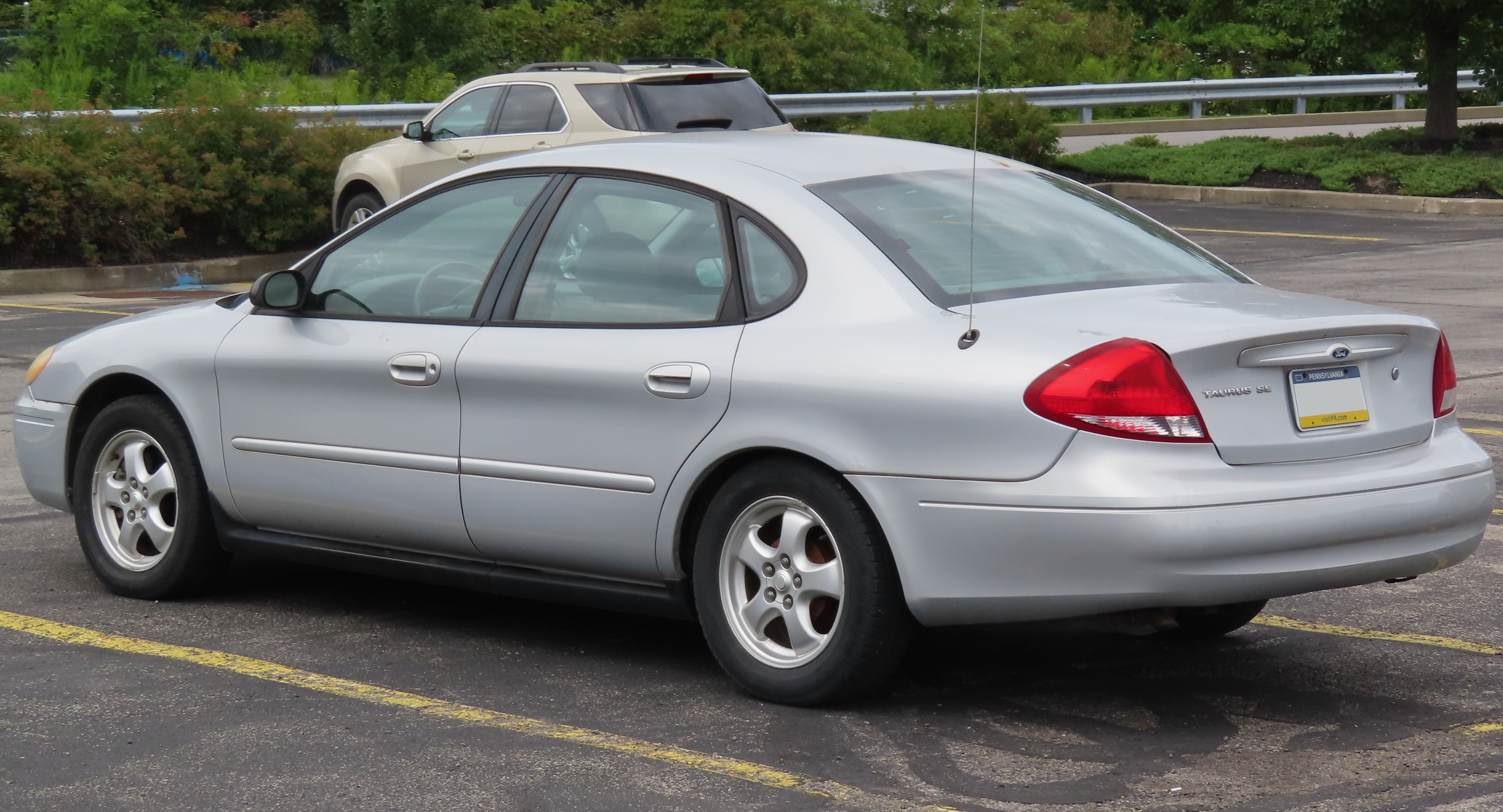
Fourth-generation Ford Taurus rear view

However, this model of Taurus is most notable for offering a special system that Ford called the "Personal Safety System". This system had sensors in the seat that detected a passenger's weight and position, and inflated the airbags to match. This generation of Taurus was sold from 1999 through the beginning of the 2007 model year, in which it was discontinued with the entire Taurus nameplate. However, the Taurus nameplate would later be revived in a matter of months due to the insistence of then-new Ford CEO Alan Mulally.
