= Mahendra Bhandari =

Indian surgeon

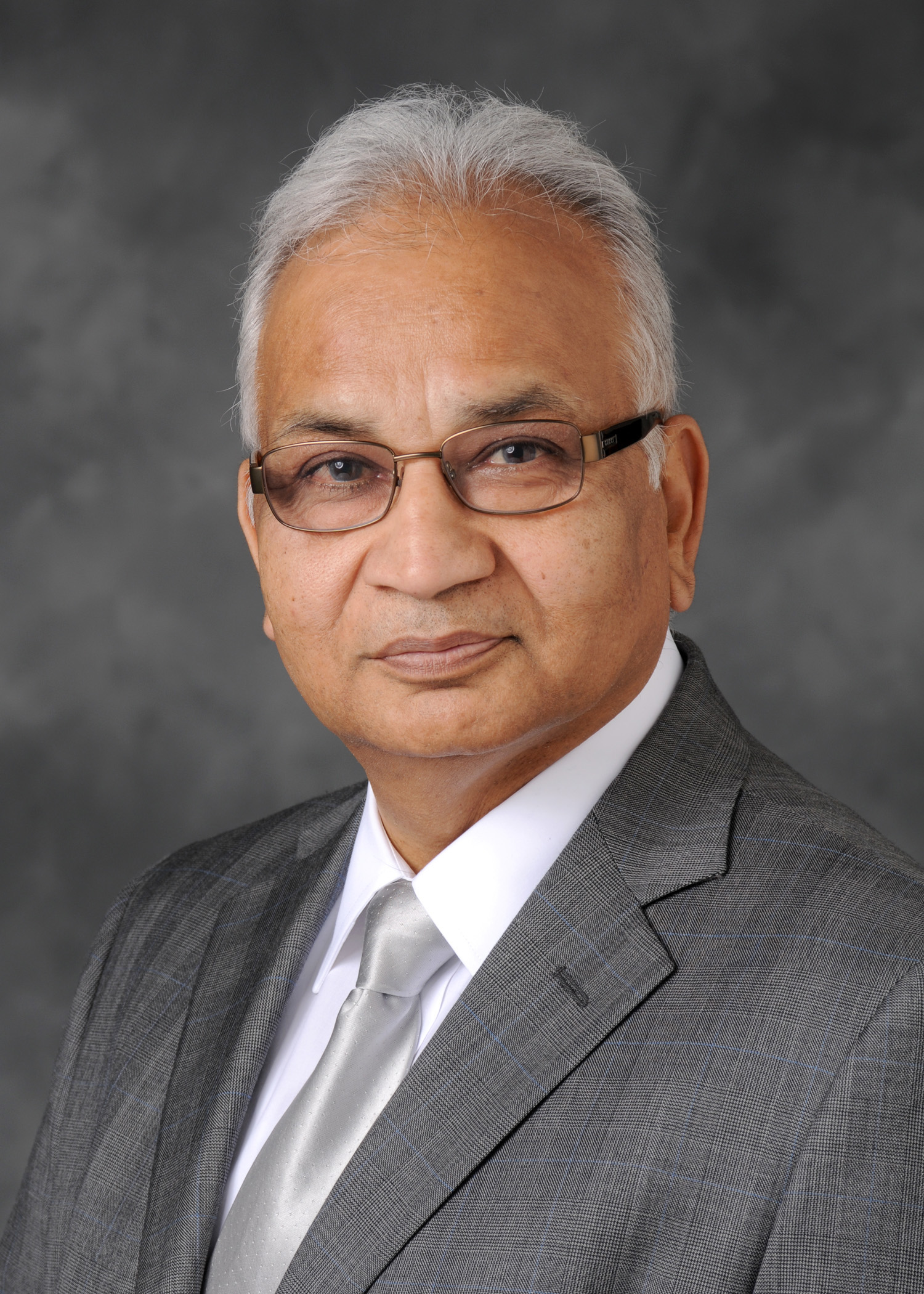
- Born: 24 December 1945 (age 80)
- Education: Sawai Man Singh Medical College
- Occupations: Urologist and Senior Bio-Scientist and Director of Robotic Surgery Research & Education at the Vattikuti Urology Institute at the Henry Ford Hospital in Detroit, MI
- Spouse: Sushma Bhandari
- Children: Dr. Akshay Bhandari

Mahendra Bhandari (born 24 December 1945) is an Indian surgeon who has made substantial contributions to the specialty of urology, medical training, hospital administration, robotic surgery and medical ethics. For his efforts, he was awarded the Padma Shri by the government of India in 2000. Bhandari is currently Senior Bio-scientist and Director of Robotic Surgery Research & Education at the Vattikuti Urology Institute (VUI) in Detroit, MI. He was the Symposium coordinator of the International Robotic Urology Symposium. He also has been the CEO of the Vattikuti Foundation since 2010.

== Academic career ==
A medical graduate of Rajasthan University, Bhandari completed his urology residency at Christian Medical College, Vellore, India. Beginning his academic career as a lecturer at the Sawai Man Singh Medical College and Hospital in Jaipur, Bhandari would eventually rise to become the Head of the Department of Urology and Kidney Transplantation at the Sanjay Gandhi Post Graduate Institute of Medical Sciences (SGPGIMS) in Lucknow, India. He was the Vice Chancellor of King George's Medical University, Lucknow. Here, Bhandari mentored urologic surgeons who have since assumed leadership posts in medical institutions in India and around the world. He is the founder of the Center of Biomedical Magnetic Resonance in Lucknow, India and is currently enlisted as an honorary professor.

Bhandari's eclectic interests include kidney transplantation, stone disease, and urethroplasty. Bhandari's research would substantially improve the management of urethral strictures, the narrowing of the urethra, caused by either injury or infection. Bhandari also established the Indian Journal of Urology in 1984, an open-access and widely read source of literature.

In April 2008, Bhandari completed a graduate bio-statistic course at the Faculty of Arts and Science at Harvard University alongside two of his most promising associates. Dr. Bhandari received his Masters in Business Administration at the Ross School of Business at the University of Michigan in Ann Arbor on 30 April 2010. He also earned a certificate in a course conducted by Prof. John B. Taylor: Principles of Economics from Stanford University 19 September 2017, (With Distinction).

== Administration ==
Upon promotion to Director and lead administrator of the Sanjay Gandhi Post Graduate Institute of Medical Sciences (SGPGIMS) in Lucknow, Bhandari began a long administrative career, including the post of Vice Chancellor at Lucknow Medical University. Despite severe resistance from entrenched interests and the general bureaucratic nature of government of India, Bhandari played an important role in advancing India's medical training as the country entered the 21st century.

Serving on the boards of multiple journals and as the president of several medical societies, Bhandari exerted vast influence on the practice and teaching of medicine, especially the development of residency programs for the specialty of urology. After a successful span at the SGPGIMS, he was named director and became the first Vice-Chancellor of Chhatrapati Shahu Ji Maharaj Medical University (now King George's Medical University) in Lucknow, India in 2003. His leadership also included a founding role in the production of medvarsity.com, an online portal for medical education.

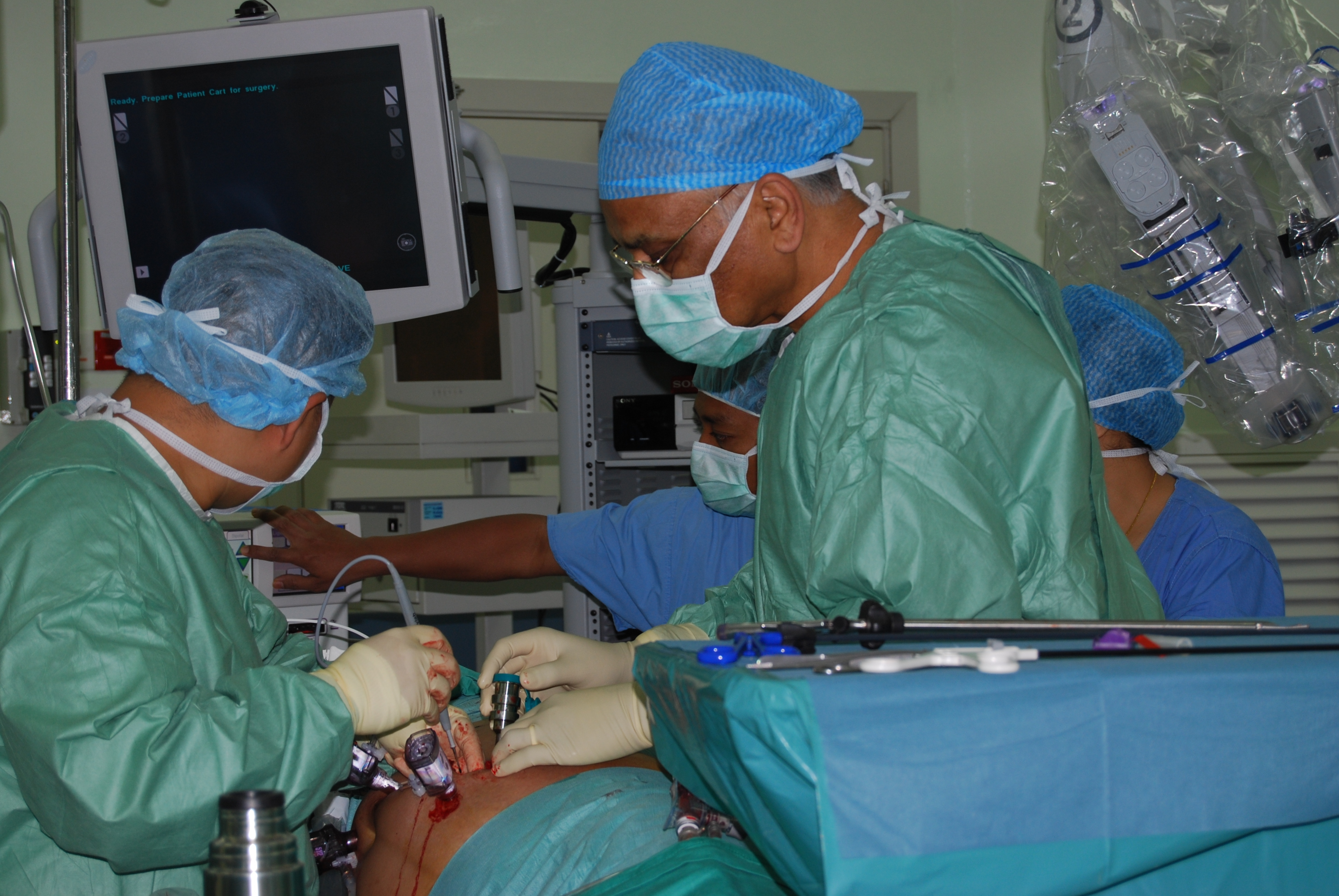
Bhandari Operating in Malaysia.

== Medical Ethics Activism ==
Bhandari's interest in renal transplantation sparked an active role in creating regulations for safe donor practices while addressing gender and economic inequality in access to care. In 2004, Bhandari was a member of the select Vancouver forum that created a definitive statement for ethical live lung, liver, pancreas, and intestinal organ donation.

== Vattikuti Urology Institute ==
Bhandari made his move to Detroit, Michigan to join Dr. Mani Menon and his team of robotic surgeons at the Vattikuti Urology Institute (VUI) in 2005, to aid them in advancing methods to treat prostate cancer and other urology procedures robotically. At the VUI, Bhandari has focused on developing the clinical research program and improving the use of biostatistics in medical research. He is also actively promoting the development of robotic surgery in Indian urology. He was part of the VUI-Medanta team which developed the Robotic Kidney Transplant With Regional Hypothermia, a new means of cooling a donor kidney- before insertion into the recipient- and during the transplant (anastomosis) process itself inside the body.

== Vattikuti Foundation ==
In 2010, Dr. Bhandari was appointed CEO of the Vattikuti Foundation. Some of his accomplishments include: November, 2011: Launching the "Vattikuti Road Show," a tour of major Indian cities promoting the benefits of robotic surgery to surgeons, hospitals and the public. 2012 & 2015 sponsoring the Vattikuti Global Robotics Multispecialty Robotic Surgery Conferences. In 2014, Indian robotic surgeons gathered in what was one of the first meetings of the Vattikuti Foundation sponsored 'Robotic Surgeons Council of India.' Dr. Robert Cerfolio was the guest International Faculty, speaking to a large audience. The group continues to meet bi-annually, holding academic discussions and sharing robotic surgery knowledge. The most recent meeting hosted over 200 members. The Vattikuti Collective Quality Initiative (VCQI) is a prospective robotic surgery database established by the Vattikuti Foundation to provide trustworthy material for researchers to study surgeon and patient outcomes. Several Vattikuti Foundation partner institutions have been established around the world. Indian news media have reported that there are 60 'da Vinci Surgical Systems' in use in India, with 360 surgeons using them as of January, 2018. The Vattikuti Foundation also has Scholarship and Fellowship programs to guide and help train young Indian surgeons.

== Honours and awards ==
1. Padma Shri, Government of India, 2000 List of Padma Shri award recipients (2000–2009)
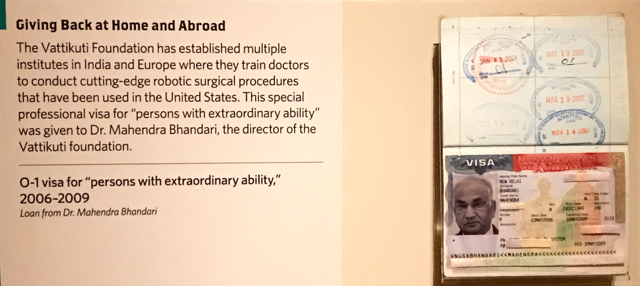
  Photo of part of a current display in the Smithsonian National Museum of American History 'Many Voices, One Nation' exhibit containing the personal visa belonging to Dr. Mahendra Bhandari.
2. Dr. B. C. Roy Award, 1995
3. President's Gold Medal, Urological Society of India,
4. Urology Gold Medal, Urological Society of India, USICON 2006
5. Dr. Pinamanneni Gold Medal, Urological Society of India
6. Dr. Himadari Sarkar Memorial Orator, Urological Society of India
7. Col. Sangam Lal Oration, National Academy of Medical Sciences of India
8. Indian American Urological Association President Award, 2014

== Recognition ==
1 Smithsonian Institution National Museum of American History 'Many Voices, One Nation' exhibit, display of professional visa, website mention, 2016
