= Craig G. Rogers =

- Born: May 26, 1971 (age 55)
- Occupations: Chair, Department of Urology Vattikuti Urology Institute, Detroit, Michigan

Craig G. Rogers (born May 26, 1971), is an American urologist and academic surgeon who serves as Chair of the Department of Urology at the Vattikuti Urology Institute, Henry Ford Hospital in Detroit, Michigan. His clinical and academic work has focused on minimally invasive and robotic approaches to urologic oncology, particularly renal surgery using da Vinci Surgical System. In 2009, he received international media attention for participating in a live robotic surgical procedure that incorporated real-time communication via social media.

== Education and career ==
Rogers earned his medical degree from Stanford University School of Medicine and completed residency training in urology at Johns Hopkins Hospital, where he served as chief resident at the Brady Urological Institute.

Following residency, he pursued fellowship training in urologic oncology at the National Cancer Institute. During his residency training and subsequent fellowship years, Rogers described formative mentorship and training under Patrick C. Walsh.

== Career and research ==
Rogers joined Henry Ford Health System in 2007, where he has held multiple clinical and academic leadership roles and was later appointed Chair of the Department of Urology. His clinical practice has centered on urologic oncology, with a focus on minimally invasive and robotic surgical techniques for renal and prostate disease.

His work has included early clinical experience with adjunct technologies in robotic renal surgery, including the use of robotically controlled intraoperative ultrasound for tumor localization and surgical planning

== Professional leadership and service ==
In addition to his institutional roles, Rogers has been active in professional and educational activities related to robotic urologic surgery, including participation in instructional courses and surgical workshops. He has also held elected leadership positions within national professional societies, including serving as a past president of the Society of Urologic Robotic Surgeons.

== Public engagement ==
In 2009, Rogers participated in a live robotic kidney surgery that incorporated real-time messaging via Twitter, an event that received coverage from major media outlets and was cited as an early example of social media engagement in the operating room.

== See also ==
- Vattikuti Urology Institute
- Robotic Surgery
