= Bourneville, Ohio =

- CDP
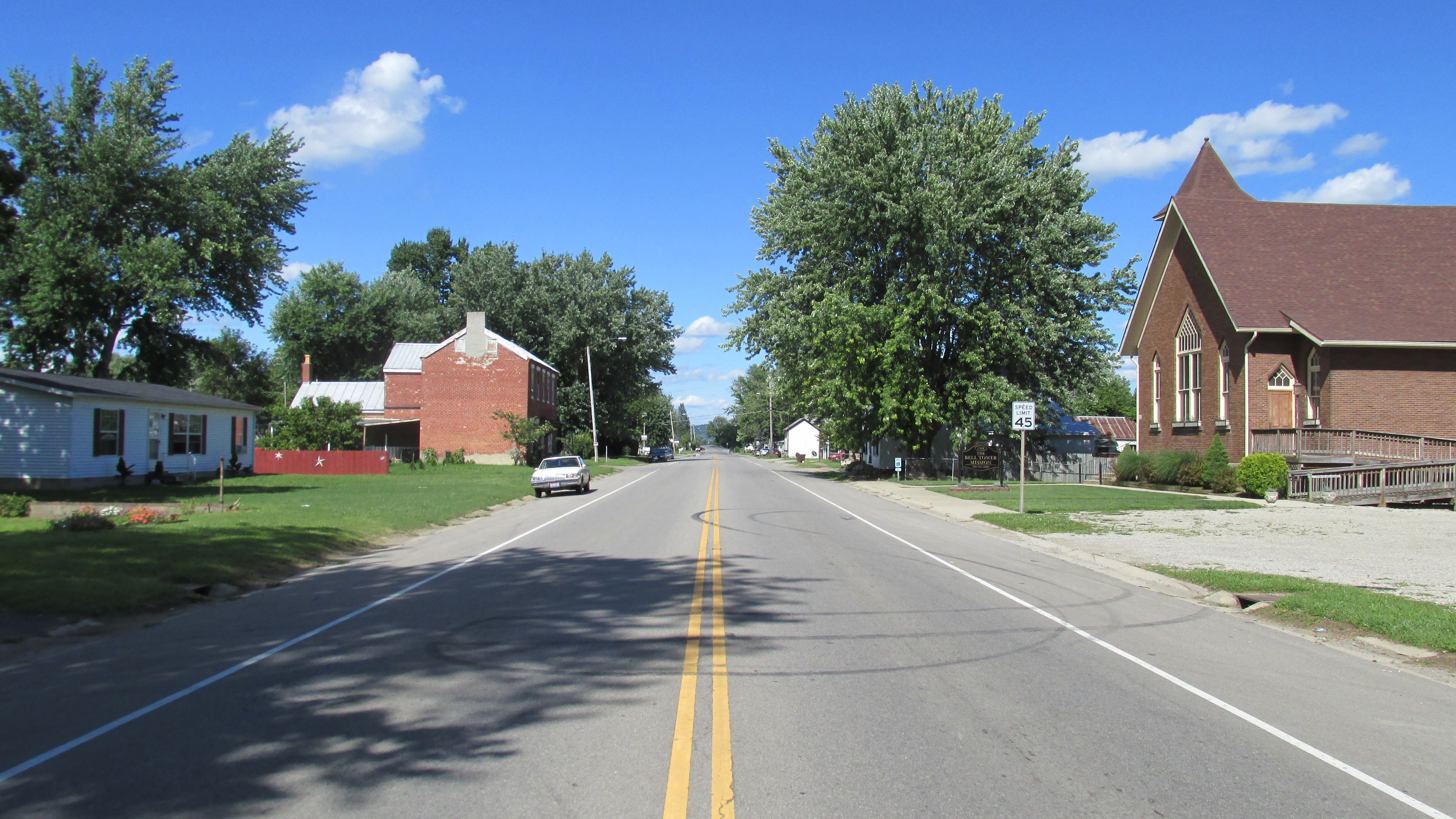
- Looking east on Main Street (US Highway 50) in Bourneville

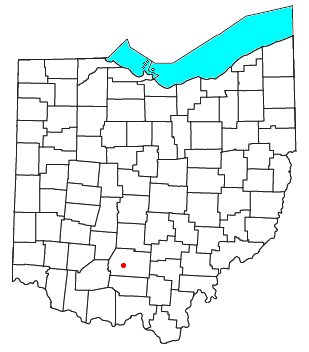
- Location of Bourneville, Ohio
- Coordinates: 39°16′58″N 83°09′35″W
- Country: United States
- State: Ohio
- County: Ross
- Township: Twin
- Elevation: 696 ft (212 m)

Population (2020)
  - Total: 241
- Time zone: UTC-5 (Eastern (EST))
  - Summer (DST): UTC-4 (EDT)
- ZIP: 45617
- GNIS feature ID: 2628867

Bourneville is a census-designated place in central Twin Township, Ross County, Ohio, United States. It has a post office with the ZIP code 45617. It lies along U.S. Route 50. The population of the CDP was 241 at the 2020 census.

== History ==
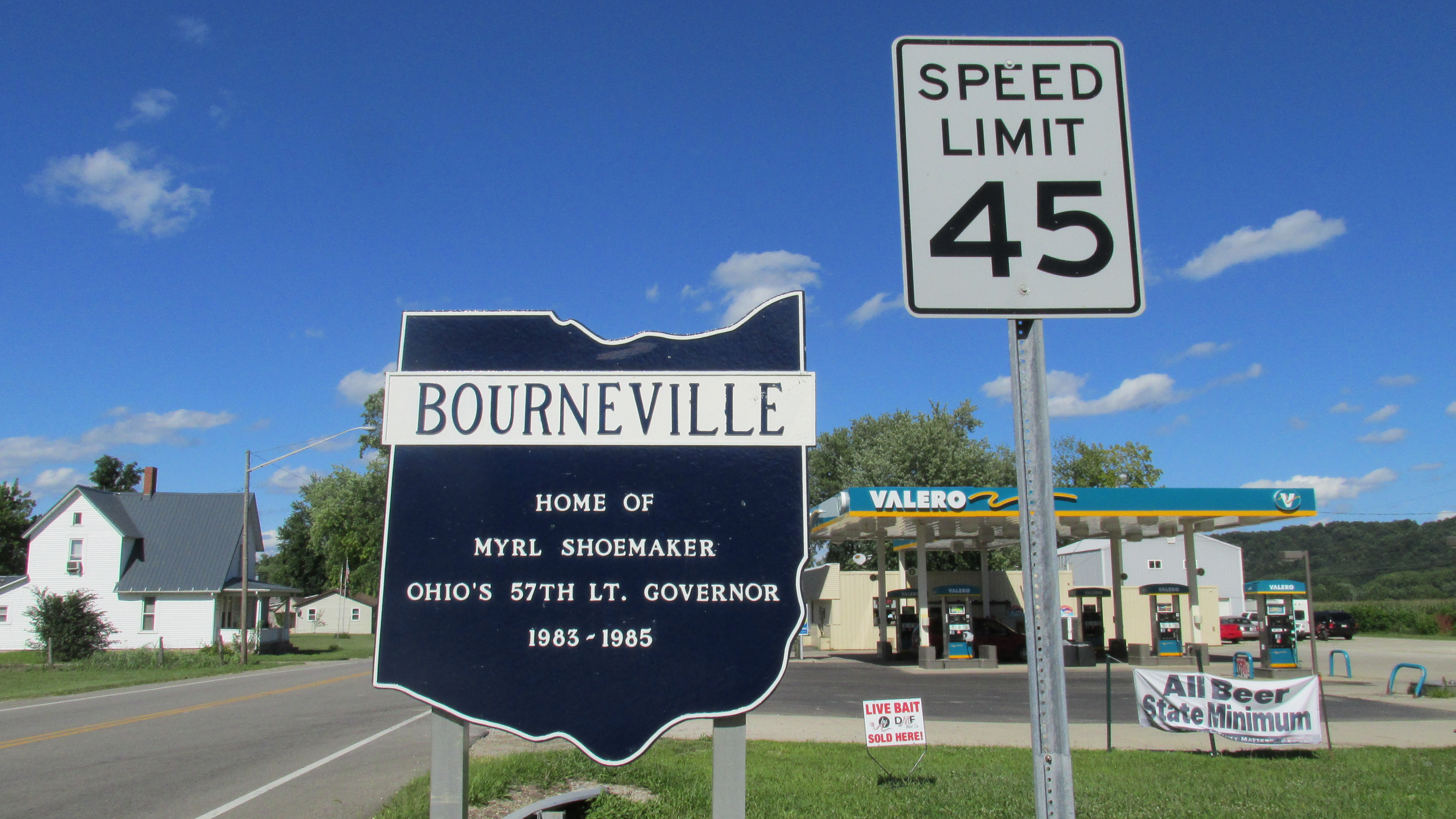
Bourneville community sign.

The first permanent settlement at Bourneville was made in the 1790s. Bourneville was platted in 1832 by Colonel Bourne, and named for him. A post office has been in operation at Bourneville since 1832. The resemblance to Bourneville, a town in Normandy, France, is a coincidence, since it is an old *Burnenville (Medieval Latin Burnenvilla, 12th century).

As of 1847, an Indian stone work was located near Bourneville. It was surveyed by Ephraim George Squier and Edwin Hamilton Davis and was featured in their book, Ancient Monuments of the Mississippi Valley, which was published in 1848.

== Education ==
It is in the Paint Valley Local School District.

== Notable person ==
- Philip Caldwell, businessman
