= Doug Gaffka =

Douglas Fredrick Gaffka is an American automotive designer widely known as the chief designer for the third generation Taurus and Sable vehicle programs in 1994 and the Mustang in 1999.

Since April 2001, Gaffka has been the design director of Ford Motor Company's Living Legends vehicle program, in which he oversees the development of classic Ford nameplates, like the Thunderbird and Mustang, as well as new vehicle design.

== Background and career ==
Gaffka graduated from the Center for Creative Studies in Detroit, Michigan with a Bachelor of Fine Arts degree in 1978. He then joined Ford that same year.

After joining Ford in 1978, Gaffka held a number of vehicle design-related positions for the company's North American operations and has worked in Ford's German and Australian operations. Gaffka was the chief designer for the Taurus and Sable vehicle programs in 1994, the Mustang in 1999, and the Thunderbird in 2001. He was also the chief designer behind the 2008 Mustang Bullitt and 2010 Mustang.

== Ford's Living Legends ==
Since April 2001, Gaffka has been the design director for the Ford Motor Company's Living Legends vehicle program. Ford's Living Legends oversees the development of classic Ford nameplates, like the Thunderbird and Mustang, as well as new vehicle design.
