= Harold Arthur Poling =

American automobile businessman

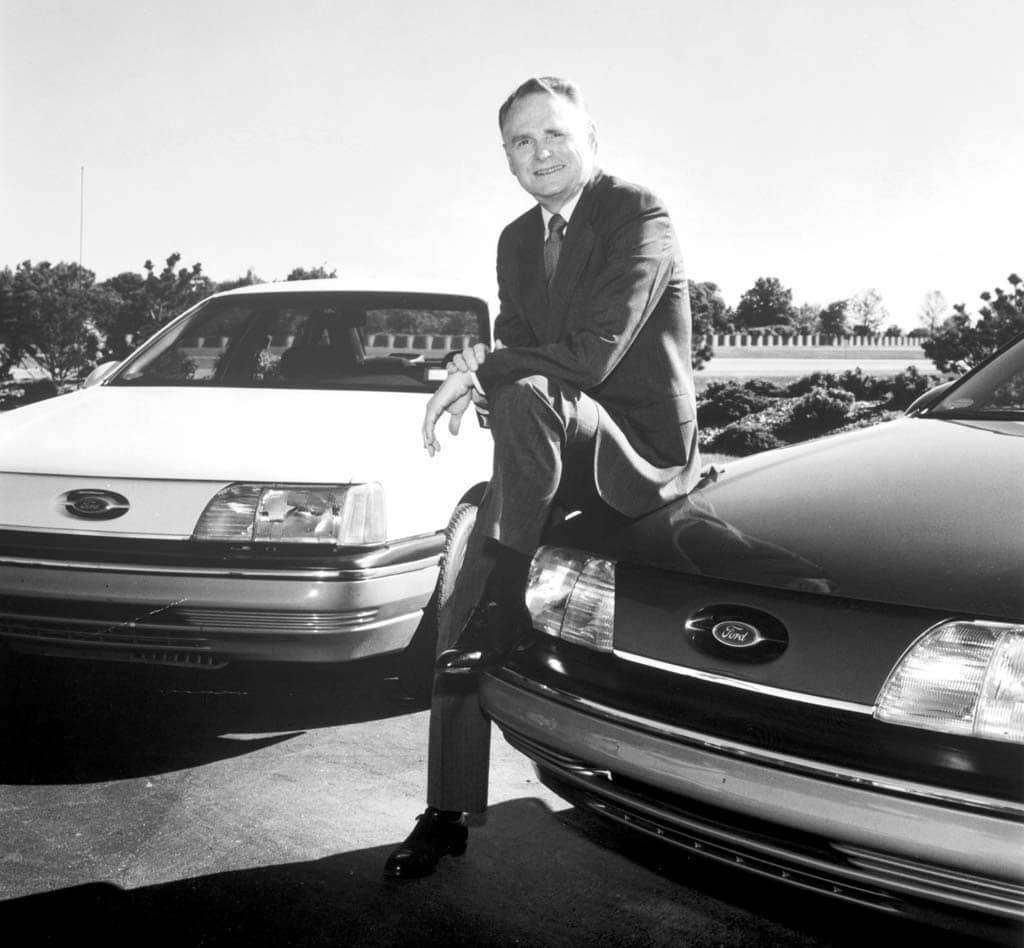
- Poling in 1986
- Born: October 14, 1925; Troy, Michigan, U.S.
- Died: May 12, 2012 (aged 86); Pacific Grove, California
- Other name: Harold Arthur "Red" Poling
- Education: Monmouth College, Indiana University
- Occupations: President of the Ford Motor Company (1985–1987); Vice-chairman (1987–1989); CEO and chairman (1990–1993)
- Awards: Lone Sailor Award, by the U.S. Navy Memorial Foundation for his naval career. Inductee, Automotive Hall of Fame.

Harold Arthur "Red" Poling (October 14, 1925 – May 12, 2012) was an American automobile businessman who was CEO and chairman of Ford Motor Company from 1990 to 1993.

== Early life and education ==
Poling was born October 14, 1925, in Troy, Michigan, and grew up in Fairfax, Virginia, in Northern Virginia. Poling began his post-high school education at Monmouth College in the U.S. Navy's V-12 program during World War II. Poling graduated from Monmouth College in 1949 majoring in economics and business administration. He earned his MBA at Indiana University.

== Career ==
=== United States Navy ===
Poling was a fighter pilot in the United States Navy. His sometime corporate rival, Robert Lutz, had been a fighter pilot in the United States Marine Corps. Their clashes sometimes led subordinates to joke about "who won the dogfight today?"

=== Ford Motor Company ===
Poling started at Ford Motor Company as an intern, while still attending Indiana University. After school, he took a job in 1951 as a cost analyst at Ford's Steel Division. Poling made his swift climb through the company as a financial executive, manager, assistant controller, and controller of the transmission and chassis division during the 1960s, then as controller of the engine division, then controller of the car product development group. During this time he was responsible for codification of much of Ford's "Finance Manual", directing his subordinates in standardization of the company's financial reporting and analysis practices. During the mid-1970s he worked in Ford's European Operations.

In the late 1970s he was vice president of corporate staffs, then in 1980 replaced William O. Bourke as executive vice-president of North American Automotive Operations (the company's biggest operating unit). The company was in cash and cost trouble, and Bourke refused to make some of the cost cuts that chairman Philip Caldwell thought necessary. Poling was never averse to cutting cost and succeeded in returning the unit to profitability. He was often cited as the man that saved Ford Motor Company in the 80's.

He was the president of the Ford Motor Company between February 1985, and October 1987, when he took the role of second vice chairman alongside then vice chairman William Clay Ford Jr. He became the CEO and chairman in March 1990, and remained in that role until 1993. He made his mark at Ford's European operations in the late 1970s and was widely considered as a savior of the company in his stint as executive vice-president for North America in the early 1980s.

== Personal life ==
Poling married Marian Lee in 1957. He had three children: Pamela, Kathryn, and Douglas. Poling was an avid and accomplished golfer.

He served as the chair of the Monmouth College board of trustees.

== Death ==
He died at the age of 86 on May 12, 2012, at his home in Pacific Grove, California.

== Awards and honors ==
In 1993, Poling was awarded the Lone Sailor Award by the U.S. Navy Memorial Foundation for his naval career.

In 1999, Poling was inducted into the Automotive Hall of Fame.

Business positions
Preceded by Donald Petersen	President of the Ford Motor Company; February 1, 1985 – October 13, 1987	Succeeded by Alexander Trotman
Preceded by Donald Petersen	Chief Executive Officer and Chairman of the Ford Motor Company; March 1, 1990 – 1993	Succeeded by Alexander Trotman
