= Great Barrier Reef Foundation =

Australian non-profit organisation

- Formerly: Great Barrier Reef Research Foundation
- Company type: Non-profit
- Industry: Environment
- Founded: 19 November 1999; 26 years ago in Newstead, Queensland, Australia
- Headquarters: Brisbane, Australia
- Area served: Australia
- Key people: David Thodey AO (Chairman); Anna Catherine Marsden (Managing Director)
- Revenue: 123,483,704 Australian dollar (2023)
- Total assets: 183,475,471 Australian dollar (2023)
- Number of employees: 42 (2021)
- Website: barrierreef.org

The Great Barrier Reef Foundation is an Australian non-profit organisation established in 1999 to help protect and preserve the Great Barrier Reef. The foundation was formed in response to the first mass coral bleaching of the reef in 1998. Climate change is the number one threat to the Great Barrier Reef and coral reefs globally. The foundation is the lead charity for the Great Barrier Reef, funding more than 300 projects with over 400 partners bringing together science, traditional owners, community, citizen science, government, business and non-governmental organizations in the mission to save the Reef and all its living diversity for future generations.

== 2018 Government grant ==
During the International Year of the Reef in 2018 the Turnbull government announced a AUD$443 million grant to the foundation. The purpose of the grant is to achieve significant, measurable improvement in the health of the Great Barrier Reef World Heritage Area in accordance with the Reef 2050 framework and underpinned by innovation, science and community engagement:

Projects enabled through the partnership between the Australian Government's Reef Trust and the foundation have six areas of focus: water quality, crown-of-thorns starfish control, reef restoration and adaptation science, traditional owner reef protection, community Reef protection and integrated monitoring and reporting.
