= Donald Petersen =

American businessman (1926–2024)

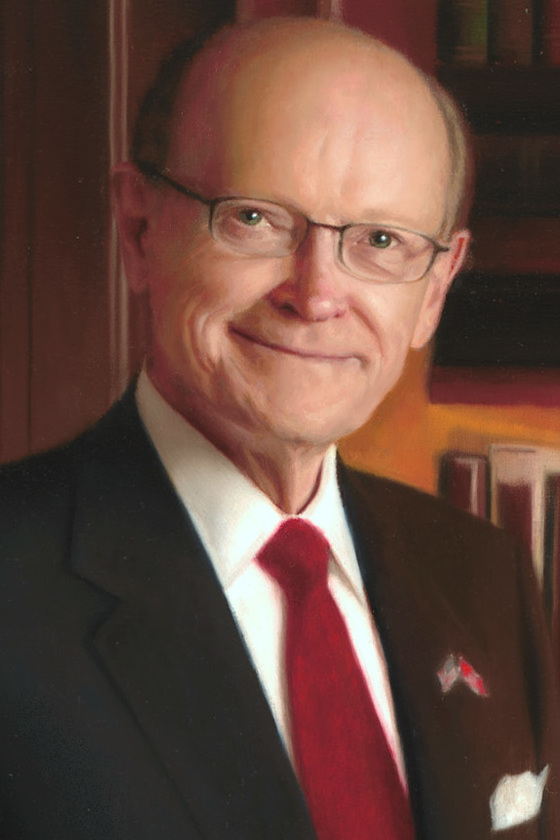
- Petersen portrait painting by Michele Rushworth
- Born: September 4, 1926; Pipestone, Minnesota, U.S.
- Died: April 24, 2024 (aged 97); Bloomfield Hills, Michigan, U.S.
- Education: University of Washington (BS, ME)
- Occupation: Businessman

Donald Eugene Petersen (September 4, 1926 – April 24, 2024) was an American businessman who was employed by the Ford Motor Company for 40 years, most notably as its chief executive officer from 1985 to 1990.

== Early life ==
Donald Eugene Petersen was born in Pipestone, Minnesota, on September 4, 1926. He served in the U.S. Marine Corps in World War II and the Korean War. Petersen received his B.S. and M.E. from the University of Washington in 1946. He was a member of Beta Theta Pi fraternity.

== Career ==
=== Tenure at Ford (1949–1990) ===
Petersen joined Ford in 1949 after receiving his MBA from the Stanford Graduate School of Business. Prior to his election as chairman, Petersen was president and COO (chief operating officer) from March 13, 1980. He was a member of the board of directors from September 8, 1977, until his retirement on March 1, 1990.

Petersen stepped down as president, and became chairman of the board and chief executive officer of Ford Motor Company on February 1, 1985. Petersen transformed Ford with his inclusive, team-oriented management style.

Petersen instructed the Ford design staff to create vehicles they would want to own. For example, when he asked Vice President of Design Jack Telnack if he would want the 1980 Ford Thunderbird in his driveway, Telnack's negative response led the company to request a complete restyling. This resulted in the redesign of the ninth-generation Thunderbird, which introduced aerodynamic body design to Ford vehicles in North America, reducing its drag coefficient from 0.50 to 0.35. This design approach was followed by other models, including the 1984 Ford Mustang SVO, 1984 Ford Tempo, 1986 Ford Aerostar, and 1986 Ford Taurus. The redesign of the Thunderbird increased sales and profitability during the 1980s.

=== Final years at Ford (1987–1990) ===
Petersen's relationship with members of the founding Ford family became strained after he opposed the nomination of founder Henry Ford's great-grandsons, Edsel Bryant Ford II ("Edsel") and William Clay Ford Jr. ("Billy", "Bill Jr.", and later just "Bill") to certain committees of the board of Ford in the wake of the death of family patriarch and former Ford chairman & CEO Henry Ford II in 1987. Petersen's primary motivation was to permit more time to pass before a decision was made concerning the futures of the two young Fords. The widening of this schism later cut short Petersen's tenure at Ford, after a high-profile and public disagreement spilled over into the press regarding differences in strategic direction between Petersen and the members of the Ford family.

These differences were largely due to Petersen's purchase of the bankrupt Jaguar Cars company after a bidding war between Ford and General Motors. In this case, the press did not have the story straight, as Petersen had indicated his plan to retire before the decision was made to acquire Jaguar.

In the years since, Ford contributed major managerial resources to and several times recapitalized Jaguar with no subsequent return of investment. Ford divested itself of Jaguar on June 2, 2008.

Petersen was succeeded as CEO by Harold "Red" Poling.

=== Life after Ford ===
Petersen at various times held director-level board positions at The Boeing Company, starting in 1997, Dow Jones & Co., the Hewlett-Packard Company, Capital Research and Management Company (mutual funds), Axicon Technologies, the Juran Center for Leadership in Quality (member, executive advisory board), the College of Arts & Sciences at the University of Washington (president, advisory board), and Long Shadows Vintners. A portrait of Petersen, painted by artist Michele Rushworth hangs in the Petersen Room in the Allen Library at the University of Washington.

In 2006, he recommended Alan Mulally of Boeing to Bill Ford Jr. for the position of CEO and president at Ford Motor Company.

== Personal life ==
Petersen was a member of the Business Council, the National Academy of Engineering, SAE, the Engineering Society of Detroit, and Mensa.

Petersen and his wife, Jo Anne, resided in Bloomfield Hills, Michigan; Seattle, Washington; and Montecito, California. They had two children, Leslie Price (born 1956), and Donald L. Petersen (born 1958).

Petersen died in Bloomfield Hills, Michigan on April 24, 2024, at the age of 97.

== Awards and honors ==
- 1981 - Won University of Washington's Distinguished Alumnus Award
- 1985 - Was awarded the Stanford Business School Alumni Association's Arbuckle Award for outstanding achievement in business management
- 1986 - Golden Plate Award of the American Academy of Achievement
- 1988 - "Most Valuable Person" by USA Today
- 1988 - Elected as member of the National Academy of Engineering for "outstanding leadership in the development of high-quality, smaller, lighter, more fuel-efficient, and more socially acceptable automobiles"
- 1989 - Named "CEO of the Year" by Chief Executive Magazine

Business positions
Preceded by Philip Caldwell	President of the Ford Motor Company; March 13, 1980 – February 1, 1985	Succeeded by Harold Arthur Poling
Preceded by Philip Caldwell	Chief executive officer and chairman of the Ford Motor Company; February 1, 1985 – 1990	Succeeded by Harold Arthur Poling
