= Mani Menon =

American surgeon (born 1948)

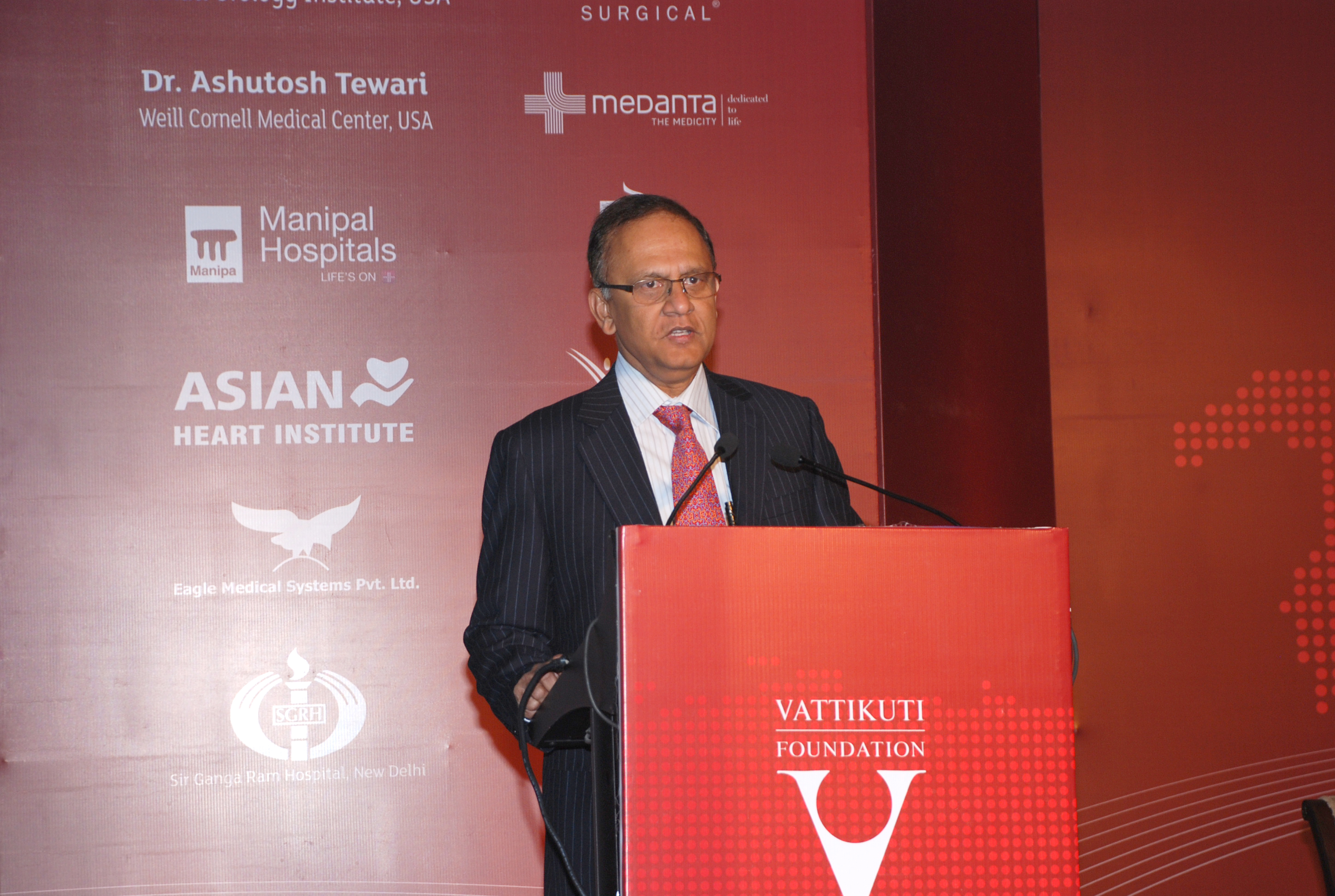
- Dr. Mani Menon at VGR 2012
- Born: 9 July 1948 (age 78) in Trichur, Kerala, India
- Education: Jawaharlal Institute of Postgraduate Medical Education and Research
- Occupations: Director of the Vattikuti Urology Institute, Detroit, Michigan
- Spouse: Dr. Shameem Menon
- Website: www.henryford.com/physician-directory/m/menon-mani

Mani Menon (born 9 July, 1948) is an Indian-American urologist whose work has helped to lay the foundation for modern Robotic cancer surgery. He is the founding director and the Raj and Padma Vattikuti Distinguished Chair of the Vattikuti Urology Institute at the Henry Ford Hospital in Detroit, MI, where he established the first cancer-oriented robotics program in the world. Menon is widely regarded for his role in the development of robotic surgery techniques for the treatment of patients with prostate, kidney, and bladder cancers, as well as for the development of robotic kidney transplantation.

Menon is the recipient of the Gold Cystoscope Award (American Urological Association, 2001), Hugh Hampton Young award (American Urological Association, 2011), the Keyes Medal (American Association of Genitourinary surgeons, 2016), the prestigious B.C. Roy award (Awarded by the President of India, for his achievements in the fields of urology and robotics).

== Early years and career ==
He started his medical journey from JIPMER in 1964, where he did his MBBS. Menon developed a novel technique to measure androgen receptors in the human prostate. At the age of 34, Menon became the chairman of the Urology department at the University of Massachusetts Medical Center in Worcester, Massachusetts. During early career, his major contributions were in the field of kidney stone disease where he helped develop the use of intra-operative ultrasonography as an aid to renal stone management and also devised methods to quantify citrate and oxalate levels in urine using ion chromatography.

== See also ==
- Vattikuti Urology Institute
- International Robotic Urology Symposium
