= Alexander Trotman, Baron Trotman =

British businessman (1933–2005)

The Right Honourable The Lord Trotman
- Born: Alexander James Trotman; 22 July 1933; Isleworth, Middlesex, United Kingdom
- Died: 25 April 2005 (aged 71); Yorkshire, United Kingdom
- Occupation: Company director

Member of the House of Lords
- Lord Temporal
- Life peerage 2 March 1999 – 25 April 2005

Alexander James Trotman, Baron Trotman (22 July 1933 – 25 April 2005) was a British-born businessman who was the CEO of Ford Motor Company from 1993 to 1998. Trotman was the first foreign-born chairman and CEO of a Big Three American automobile manufacturer.

== Life and career ==
Trotman was born on 22 July 1933 in Middlesex. He was educated at Boroughmuir School in Edinburgh, and after studying at the University of East London, received a Master's degree in business administration from Michigan State University in East Lansing, United States. Trotman was a member of the Royal Air Force before leaving for the private sector.

Trotman joined Ford in 1955 as a management trainee in the United Kingdom. He was involved in the development of the Ford Cortina compact car there and was noticed by Henry Ford II. He came to the United States and earned a reputation for cost cutting.

Trotman became CEO of the company in November 1993 and remained in the position until he stepped down in December 1998. Trotman retired in January 1999 after 43 years with Ford in a variety of positions throughout Europe, North America, and Asia-Pacific. He was the first foreign-born CEO of the company, followed by Jacques Nasser who was also born abroad (in Lebanon, raised in Australia).

One of Trotman's main contributions at Ford was the Ford 2000 initiative, launched in 1995. This was an attempt to unify and consolidate Ford's manufacturing, marketing and product development forces around the world. The initiative produced $5 billion in cost savings, and produced $7 billion in profits for Ford in 1997. Some people considered it a failure, however, as many of the resulting products (like the Ford Contour and Mercury Mystique designs based on the European Ford Mondeo platform), were not very competitive in the American market in the long term, and the major restructuring was disruptive to the company. The inability of senior management to successfully implement this program in the mid- to late-1990s turned out to be a huge opportunity lost, one that Ford was still desperately trying to leverage under the leadership of Alan Mulally in 2007.

Trotman was knighted by Queen Elizabeth II in 1996 and was created a Life peer as Baron Trotman of Osmotherley in the County of North Yorkshire, on 2 March 1999 in recognition of his contributions to industry.

Trotman was a director of ICI from 1997 until 2003 and became Chairman in January 2002. He ranked number 865 on the Sunday Times Rich List 2004 with a net worth of £45m.

He died on 25 April 2005 in Yorkshire.

Business positions
Preceded by Harold Arthur Poling	Chief Executive Officer of the Ford Motor Company; 1993–1998	Succeeded by Jacques Nasser
