= Philip Caldwell =

American businessman (1920–2013)

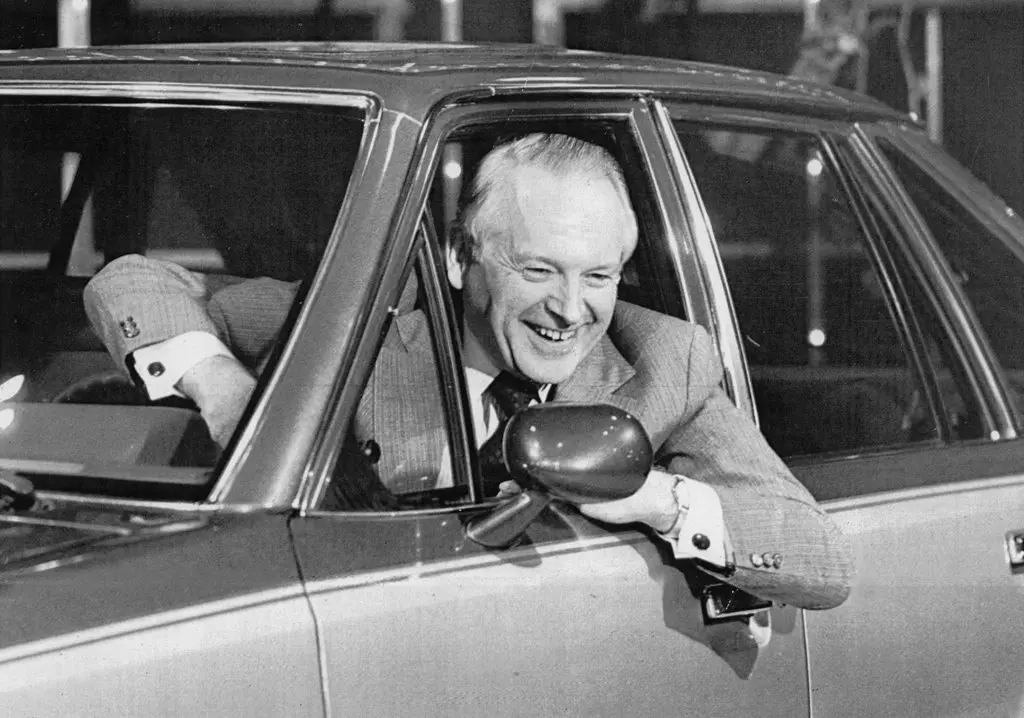
- Caldwell in 1981
- Born: January 27, 1920; Bourneville, Ohio, U.S.
- Died: July 10, 2013 (aged 93); New Canaan, Connecticut, U.S.
- Education: Muskingum College (BA) Harvard University (MBA)
- Occupation: Automobile industry executive
- Employer: Ford Motor Company
- Awards: Automotive Hall of Fame

Philip Caldwell (January 27, 1920 – July 10, 2013) was the first person to run the Ford Motor Company (after John S. Gray) who was not a member of the Ford family. He orchestrated one of the most dramatically successful turnarounds in business history.

== Early life and education ==
Caldwell was born in Bourneville, Ohio, the son of Robert Clyde Caldwell (1882 – 1935), a farmer, and Wilhelmina Hemphill (1881 – 1966). He grew up in South Charleston, Ohio, and graduated from Southeastern High School. Caldwell was of English ancestry.

Caldwell was a 1940 graduate of Muskingum College where he majored in economics and was a member of the school's debate team. In 1942, he earned a Master of Business Administration degree from the Harvard Business School.

== Career ==
He served in the U.S. Navy as a Lieutenant during World War II.

Starting at Ford in 1953, he successively headed truck operations, the Philco division, and international operations; in the last of these positions he introduced the Ford Fiesta into Europe.

Following the firing of Lee Iacocca in July 1978, Caldwell became president of Ford Motor Company on October 16, 1978. On October 1, 1979, Henry Ford II retired as CEO and as chairman of the board of directors on March 13, 1980; Caldwell succeeded him in each position.

As Chairman of the Board and CEO, Caldwell approved and oversaw the development and launch of the Ford Taurus (and its corporate sister the Mercury Sable) which were introduced to the media days before his retirement, thus allowing him to take public credit for the Taurus program, which became one of the biggest successes in automobile business history. On February 1, 1985, Caldwell retired from Ford, He later accepted a position as senior managing director at Shearson Lehman Brothers in New York. On September 23, 1985, he was one of 21 new members appointed to the President's Export Council. He was inducted into the Automotive Hall of Fame in 1990.

== Death ==
Caldwell died at his home in New Canaan, Connecticut, on July 10, 2013, at the age of 93.

== Awards and honors ==
- Industry Leader of the Year Award, Automotive Hall of Fame (1984)
- Golden Plate Award of the American Academy of Achievement (1984)
- Inducted into the Automotive Hall of Fame (1990)
- Harvard Business School named the Philip Caldwell Professor of Business Administration chair in his honor (1990)

Business positions
Preceded by Henry Ford II	Chief executive officer of the Ford Motor Company; 1979 – 1985	Succeeded by Donald Petersen
Preceded by Lee Iacocca	President of the Ford Motor Company; October 16, 1978 – March 13, 1980	Succeeded by Donald Petersen
Preceded by Henry Ford II	Chairman of the Ford Motor Company; March 13, 1980 – 1985	Succeeded by Donald Petersen
