= Raj Vattikuti =

American-Indian entrepreneur, business executive and philanthropist

- Born: 15 April 1950 (age 76)
- Occupations: Entrepreneur, Business Executive, Philanthropist
- Known for: Founder of Altimetrik, Covansys, Synova, Vattikuti Ventures, Vattikuti Technologies, Vattikuti Foundation, and Davinta Technologies

Raj Vattikuti is an American-Indian entrepreneur, business executive and philanthropist. He is the Founder and Chairman of Altimetrik Corp. He is also the founder of Vattikuti Foundation. through which he is involved in many charitable causes. Previously, he was Founder and CEO of Covansys Corp., an IT services company, which was acquired by Computer Sciences Corporation in a $1.3 billion deal.

== Early life and education ==
Raj Vattikuti was born in the state of Andhra Pradesh, India. He is married to Padma Vattikuti. He attended College of Engineering, Guindy India, where he earned a bachelor's degree in Electronic Engineering. He then attended Wayne State University where he earned an MS degree in Electrical and Computer Engineering. Raj Vattikuti also holds an Honorary Doctorate in Business Administration from Bryant College.

== Career ==
Prior to his first venture, Raj Vattikuti was an MIS project leader for Chrysler Corporation between 1977 and 1983. Between 1983 and 1985, he was the Director of MIS in Yurika Foods Corporation. He founded Covansys Corp. – initially named Complete Business Solutions, Inc. – in 1985, which was acquired by Computer Science Corporation in 2007. He founded Vattikuti Foundation in 1997; Synova, Inc., in 1998; and Altimetrik Corp., in 2012. He is also the founder of Davinta Technologies, Vattikuti Technologies, and Vattikuti Ventures.

== Awards and recognition ==
Raj Vattikuti is the recipient of the 2021 Inspire Arts & Music "Champion Award" with his wife, Padma Raj has also received the TiE Detroit 2017 Lifetime Achievement Award, 2007 Woodrow Wilson Award for Corporate Citizenship, 2002 Ellis Island Medal of Honor, and Dykema Gossett 2001 Lifetime Achievement Award.

== Philanthropy ==
Raj Vattikuti donated $20 million each to Henry Ford Hospital and William Beaumont Hospital in Detroit, Michigan in 2001. He founded the Poverty Alleviation Initiative in 2009 which works towards rural health, education and employment in rural India. In April 2020, he donated $400,000 to facilitate – in partnership with the Henry Ford Health System and the City of Detroit – on-site COVID-19 testing for all residents of the city's 126 nursing homes and senior assisted living facilities.
