= Vattikuti Urology Institute =

The Vattikuti Urology Institute
- VUI Logo
- Established: April, 2001
- Chair: Dr. Craig Rogers
- Vice Chair: Dr. Jim Peabody
- Staff: 150 (2007)
- Location: Henry Ford Hospital, Detroit, Michigan United States
- Website: Vattikuti Urology Institute

The Vattikuti Urology Institute (VUI) is a clinical and research center for urology, located at the Henry Ford Hospital in Detroit, Michigan.

It is known for being the first institute to implement robotic surgery as a type of treatment for patients with prostate cancer. To date, the institute has performed more than 10,000 robotic procedures.

The Vattikuti Urology Institute has been ranked highly by U.S. News & World Report. The VUI treats nearly 50,000 patients annually.

== History ==
The Henry Ford Hospital recruited Dr. Mani Menon as department chair in 1997. In 1999, Raj Vattikuti announced a research initiative to help patients with prostate cancer. The University of Michigan, William Beaumont Hospital, and Henry Ford Hospital competed for the funds. Menon's proposal, submitted by Henry Ford Hospital, was to establish an institute to develop techniques for minimally invasive surgery for prostate cancer. This proposal was accepted by the Vattikuti Foundation, and the Vattikuti Urology Institute was initialized in 2001.

== The Vattikuti Foundation ==
The Vattikuti Foundation was registered with the State of Michigan as a nonprofit on October 30, 1997 and is named after Raj Vattikuti and his wife, Padma Vattikuti. The Vattikuti Foundation is a philanthropic organization located in Michigan, founded by the Vattikuti's. Vattikuti is also the founder and CEO of Covansys Corporation in Farmington Hills, Michigan. The Vattikuti Foundation is notable for making the largest philanthropic contribution to cancer research in Michigan. The Foundation donated $20 million to the Henry Ford Hospital and also $20 million to the William Beaumont Hospital, establishing the Vattikuti Digital Breast Diagnostic Center in 2001. The donation to Henry Ford Hospital was used to support the treatment and study of prostate cancer, research, and treatment advances.

== Chairmen ==
- 1997–2019: Dr. Mani Menon (Chairman Emeritus)
- 2019–present: Dr. Craig Rogers
