= Boston–Edison Historic District =

Historic district in Michigan, United States

- U.S. National Register of Historic Places
- U.S. Historic district
- Michigan State Historic Site
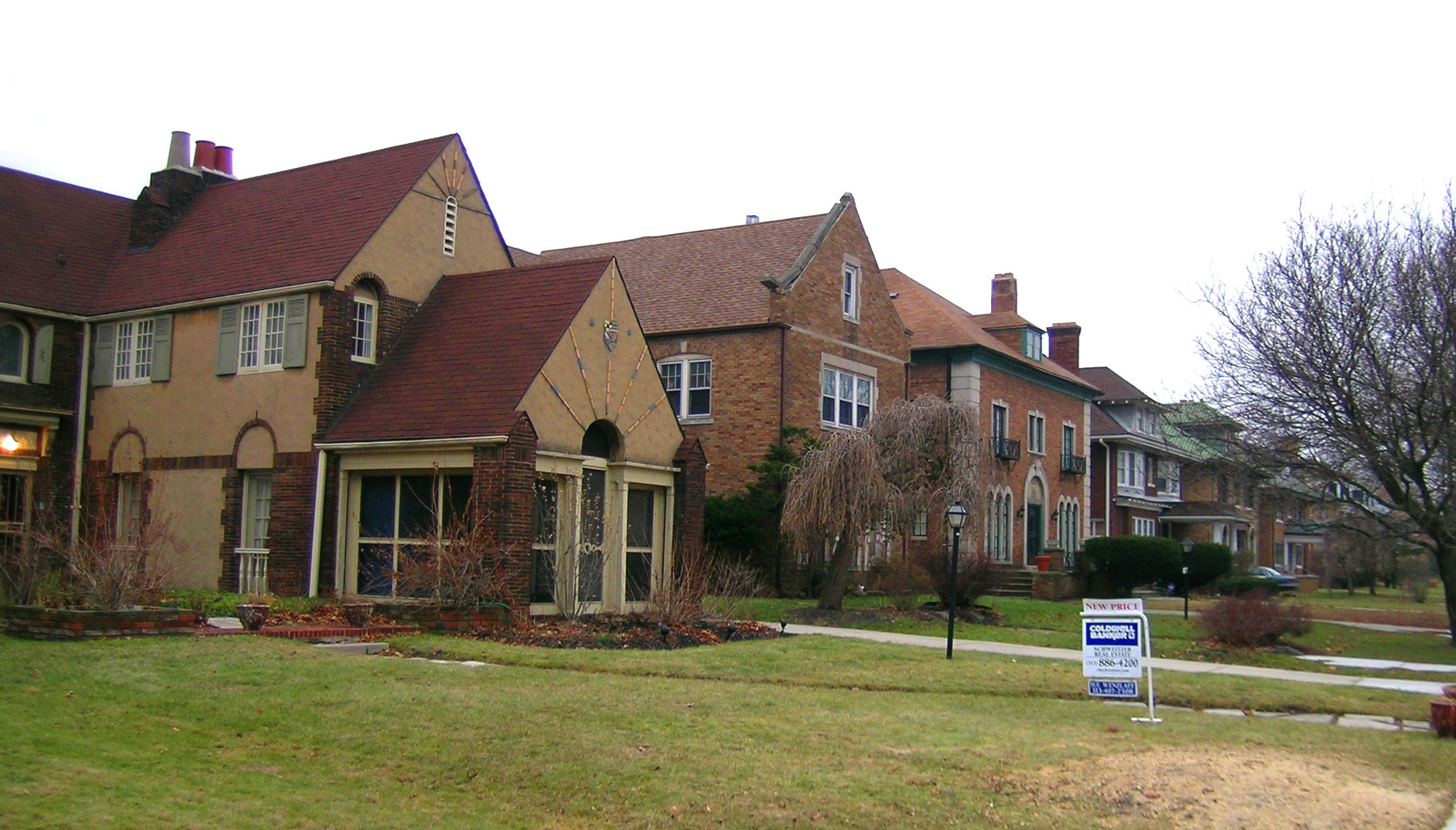
- Homes on West Boston Boulevard
- Interactive map of Boston–Edison Historic District
- Location: Bounded by Edison Ave., Woodward Ave., Linwood Ave., and W. Boston Blvd. Detroit, Michigan, U.S.
- Coordinates: 42°22′54″N 83°5′50″W
- Area: 256 acres (104 ha)
- Architectural style: Colonial Revival, Late 19th and Early 20th Century American Movements, Late 19th and 20th Century Revivals
- NRHP reference No.: 75000965

Significant dates
- Added to NRHP: September 5, 1975
- Designated MSHS: December 11, 1973

The Boston–Edison Historic District is a neighborhood located in Detroit, Michigan. It consists of over 900 homes built on four east-west streets: West Boston Boulevard, Chicago Boulevard, Longfellow Avenue and Edison Avenue, stretching from Woodward Avenue in the east to Linwood Avenue in the west. It is one of the largest residential historic districts in the nation. It is surrounded by Sacred Heart Major Seminary to the west, the Arden Park-East Boston Historic District and the Cathedral of the Most Blessed Sacrament to the east, and the Atkinson Avenue Historic District to the south. The district was designated a Michigan State Historic Site in 1973 and listed on the National Register of Historic Places in 1975.

== Description ==
A substantial number of prominent Detroiters have lived in the neighborhood. Notable residents have included labor leader Walter P. Reuther, Rabbi Morris Adler, Detroit Tigers Harry Heilmann, Dizzy Trout, Michigan Supreme Court justices Franz C. Kuhn and Henry Butzel, U.S. Representative Vincent M. Brennan, Michigan governor Harry Kelly, boxer Joe Louis, druggist Sidney Barthwell, Congressman Charles C. Diggs Jr., Congressman George D. O'Brien, Motown record label founder Berry Gordy, Detroit Tiger Willie Horton, and dentist and pioneering WCHB radio station owner Wendell F. Cox.

The District boasts the city's oldest continuous neighborhood association, the Historic Boston–Edison Association, which was founded in 1921. The District received historic designation from the Michigan State Historic Preservation Office in 1973, the Detroit Historic District Commission in 1974, and the National Register of Historic Places in 1975.

According to the 2000 Census data (which includes the surrounding streets of Atkinson, Clairmount, and Glynn Court) show Boston–Edison has both Black and White residents. The homes are owned by people from diverse occupations and professions.

== Architecture ==
Name	Image	Year	Location	Style	Architect	Notes
Walter O. Briggs House		1915	700 West Boston Boulevard	English Manor style	Chittenden and Kotting	This house was built for Walter O. Briggs, the founder of Briggs Manufacturing Company, a car-body manufacturing firm, and owner of the Detroit Tigers. The house is constructed from light-colored fieldstone.
James Couzens House		1910	610 Longfellow Avenue	Tudor Revival	Albert Kahn	This house was built for James Couzens, who was at the time a major shareholder in the immensely profitable Ford Motor Company. After leaving Ford Motor Company, James Couzens entered public service, becoming the mayor of Detroit and later a U. S. Senator. His son, Frank Couzens, also served as mayor of Detroit and lived in this house.
Charles T. Fisher House		1915	670 West Boston Boulevard	Tudor Revival	George D. Mason	This house was built for Charles T. Fisher, the president of Fisher Body corporation. It is the largest house in the Boston–Edison Historic District at 18,000 square feet (1,700 m^{2}).
Henry Ford House		1908	140 Edison Avenue	Italian Renaissance Revival	Malcomson, Higginbottom and Clement	This house was built for Henry Ford and his wife Clara, in the same year that the Model T went into production at the nearby Ford Piquette Avenue Plant. The Fords lived here until 1914 when their Fair Lane estate in Dearborn was completed. A State of Michigan Historical marker is placed in front of this house.
Berry Gordy House		1917	918 West Boston Boulevard	Italian Renaissance Revival		Originally built in 1917 for Nels Michelson, a Danish businessman who made his fortune in timber and real estate, the 10,500 sq ft (980 m^{2}) mansion was purchased in 1967 by Berry Gordy, the founder of Motown Records. It is also known as Motown Mansion.
S. S. Kresge House		1914	70 West Boston Boulevard	Mediterranean villa	Meade and Hamilton	This house was built for Sebastian S. Kresge, the founder of S. S. Kresge Company, the precursor to K-Mart. The stucco house is situated on the largest lot in the Boston–Edison neighborhood.
Benjamin Siegel House		1914	150 West Boston Boulevard	Italian Renaissance	Albert Kahn	This house was built for Benjamin Siegel, the founder of a large women's clothing store. It is built entirely of limestone, maintaining a strict sense of symmetry.

== History ==
- Henry Ford House
- U.S. Historic district – Contributing property
- Michigan State Historic Site
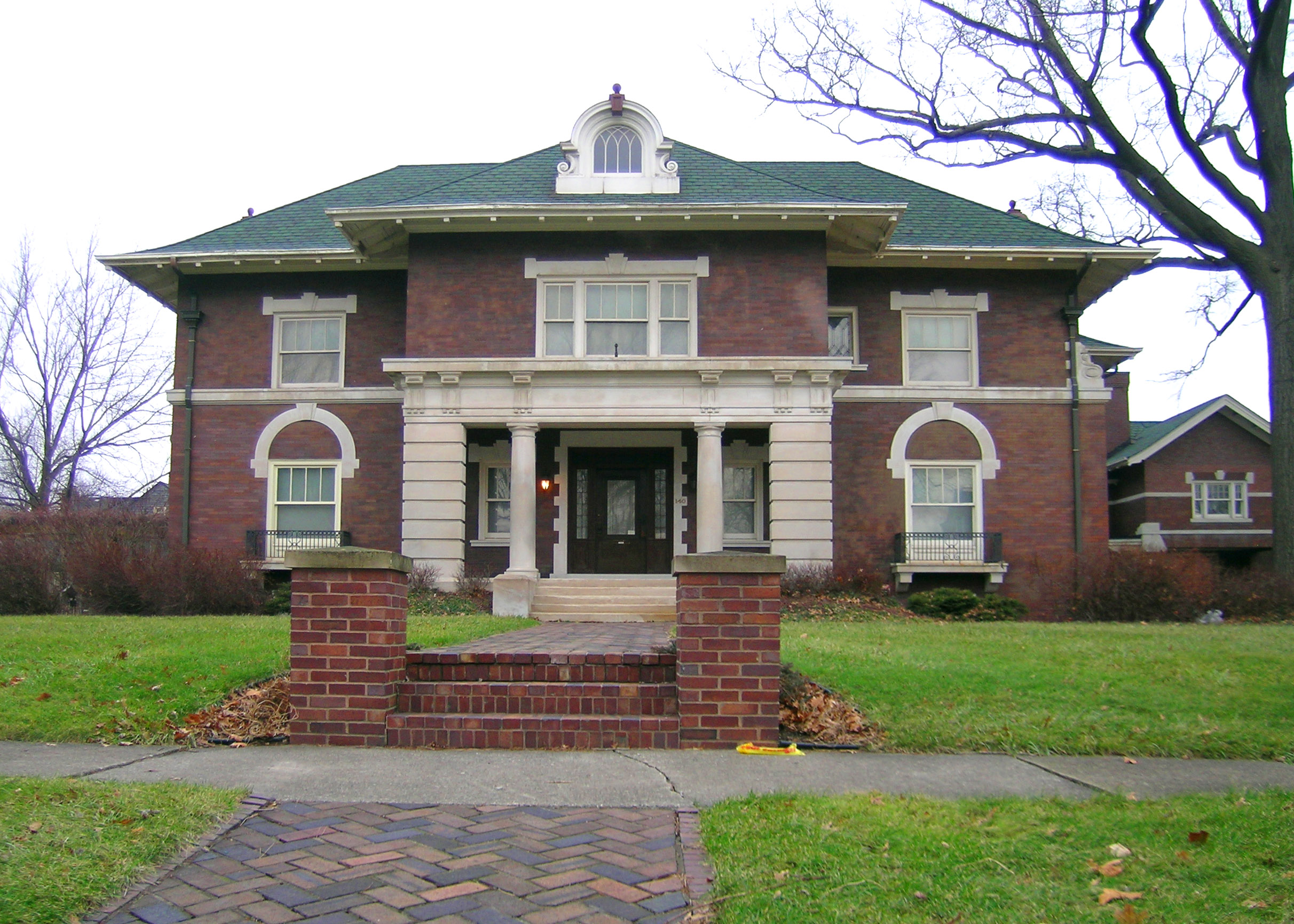
- Architect: Malcomson, Higginbotham and Clement
- Part of: Boston–Edison Historic District (ID75000965)
- Designated MSHS: July 17, 1986

The land now within the boundaries of Boston–Edison was first owned by John R. Williams (who was granted a single parcel in 1822) and Thomas Palmer (who was granted three parcels in 1828 and 1832). These original four grants were transferred from owner to owner over the next fifty years until they were obtained by the Joy family, the Newberry family, and Edward W. Voigt.

In 1891, Voigt, foreseeing the growth of Detroit northward, platted the Voigt Park subdivision, consisting of seven east–west streets from Woodward and Hamilton: Calvert Avenue, Glynn Court, Schiller Esplanade, Shakespeare Esplanade, Longfellow Avenue, Edison Avenue, and Atkinson Avenue. Four of these streets—Schiller Esplanade (now Boston Boulevard), Shakespeare Esplanade (now Chicago Boulevard), Edison Avenue and Longfellow Avenue—formed the Boston–Edison neighborhood. The original location of the neighborhood park was originally to have been between Chicago and Boston Boulevards, but was later changed to be situated between Longfellow and Edison Avenues.

The Voigt Park subdivision was immediately incorporated into the City of Detroit. Voigt platted spacious lots and set building restrictions that established the unique character of the neighborhood. His vision was followed by Truman and John Newberry, who platted the West Boston Boulevard Subdivision between Hamilton and 12th Street (now known as "Rosa Parks Boulevard") in 1913. The subdivision included lots on West Boston, Chicago, Longfellow, and Edison, as well as on Atkinson to the south. In 1915, Henry B. Joy platted the Joy Farms Subdivision between 12th Street and Linwood. This subdivision included lots on the same seven streets originally platted by Voigt. Both of these subdivisions were annexed by the City of Detroit by 1915.

The first homes built in the Boston–Edison Historic District were occupied starting in 1905, with the majority of the homes built between 1905 and 1925. Each of the homes in the neighborhood is unique. Architectural styles represented include English Tudor revival, Roman and Greek Revival, French Provincial, Colonial Revival, Italian Renaissance, Prairie Style, and Vernacular. These homes range in size from modest two-story vernaculars to massive mansions set on sprawling grounds. Although the homes are unique in style, homes along the streetscape are generally exhibit uniformity in roofline, scale, setback from the street, and the materials used, including stone, brick or wood construction. This uniformity creates a gracious suburban ambiance.

=== Original residents ===
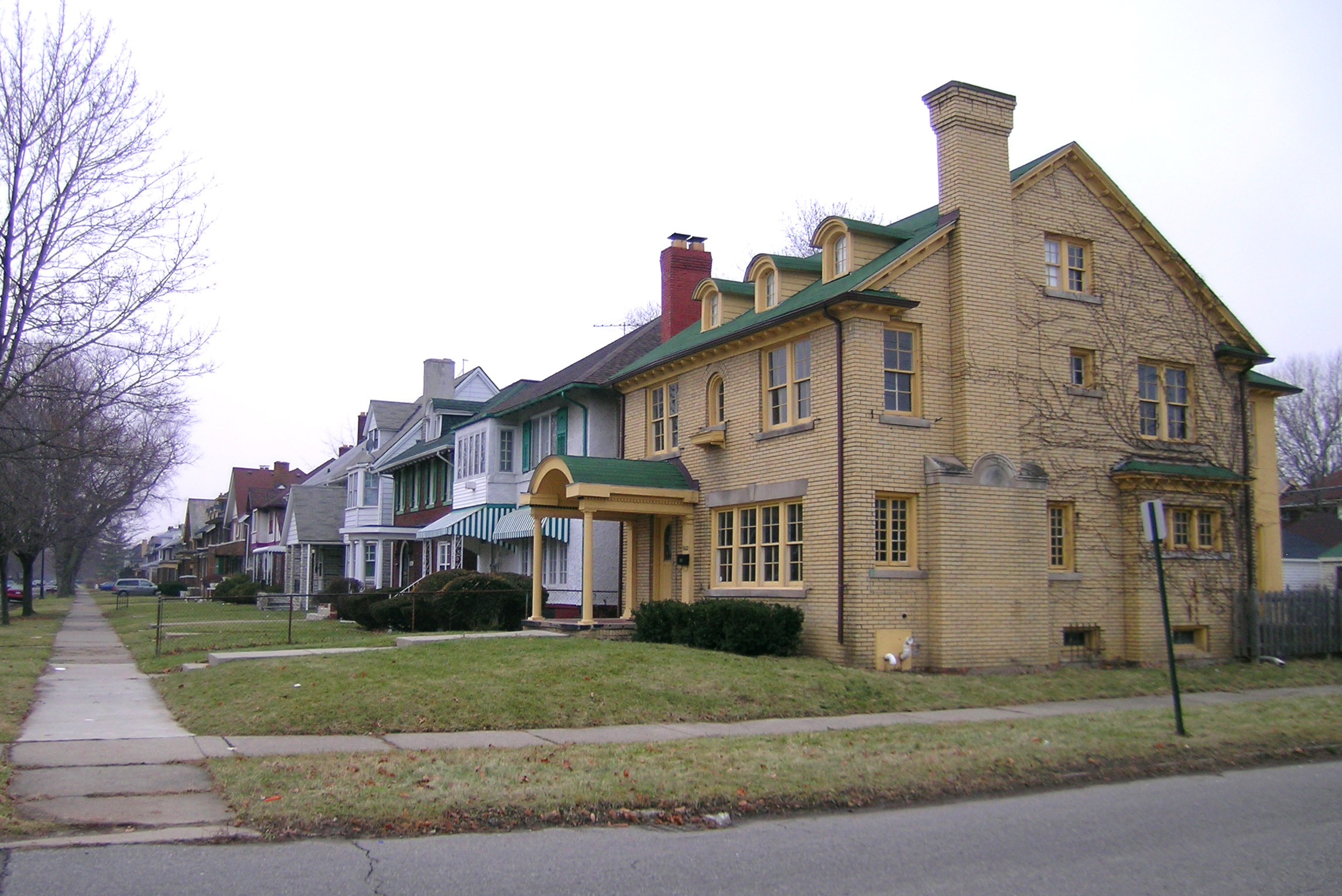
A street scape on Edison Avenue

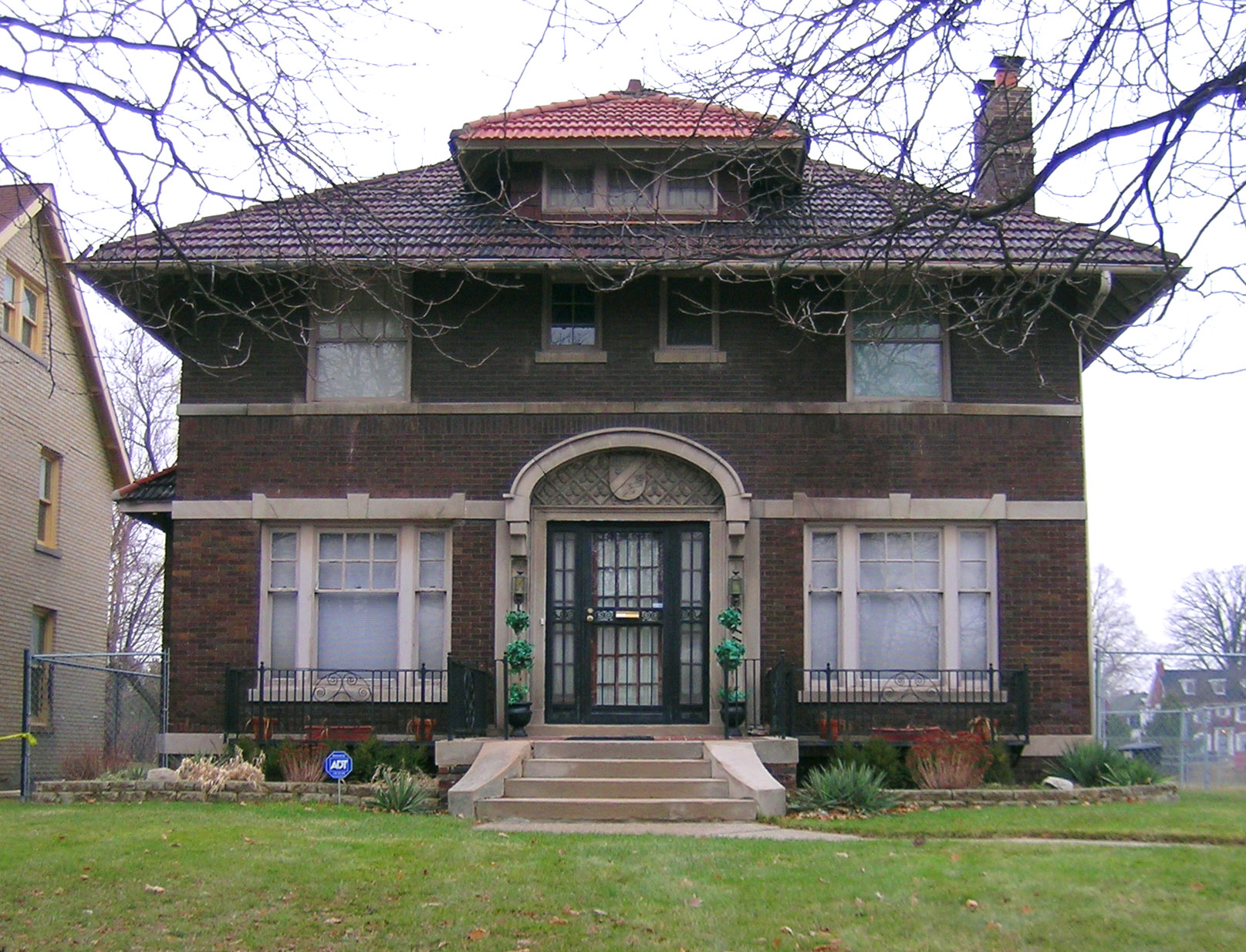
A three-story colonial on Chicago Boulevard near Hamilton

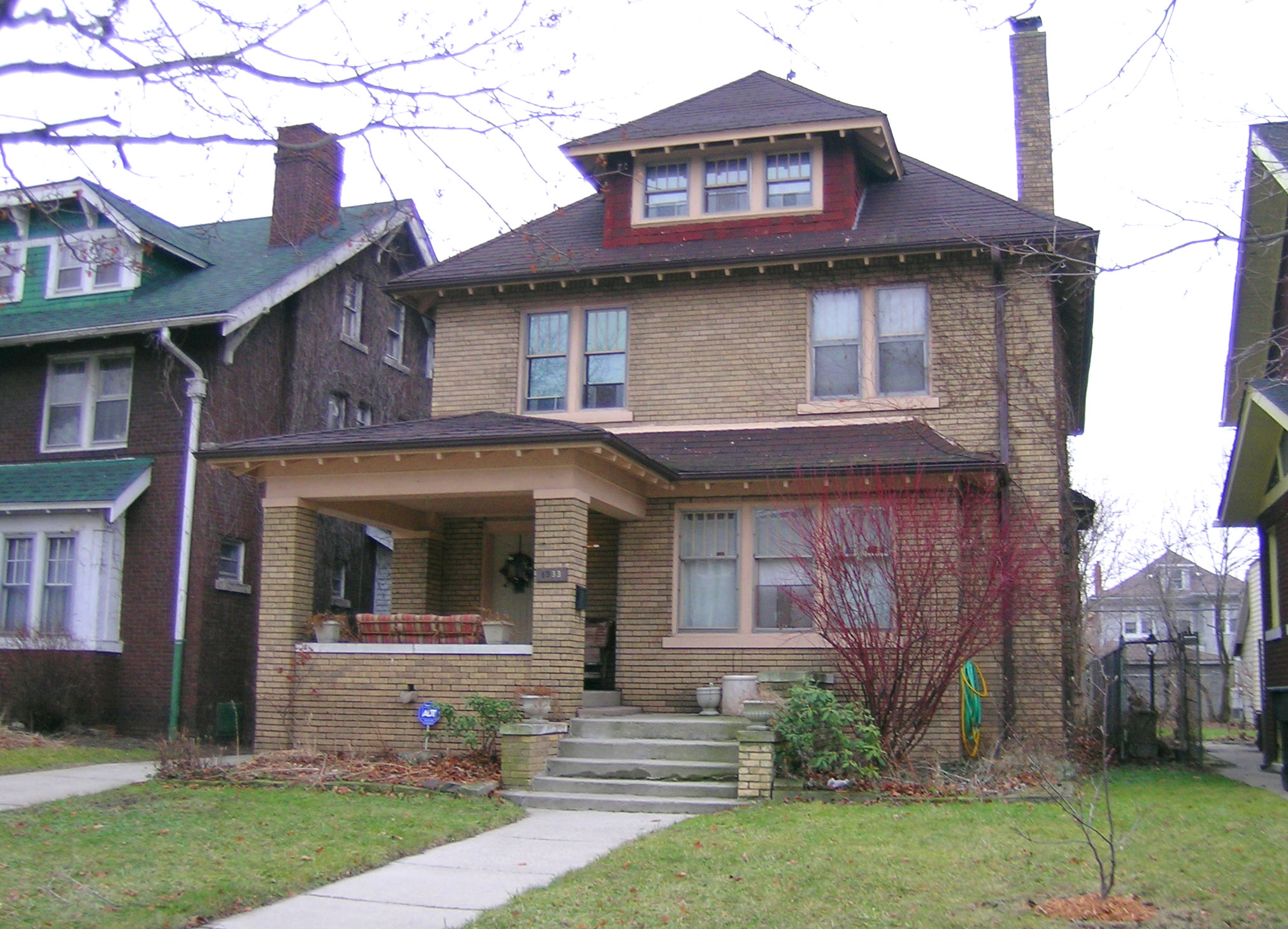
A modest three-story vernacular on Edison Avenue

One of the earliest residents of the Boston-Edison neighborhood, Henry Ford, was also one of the most well-known. In 1907, Ford had a brick and limestone Italian Renaissance Revival residence built at the corner of Edison and Second at a cost of $483,253. Ford and his wife, Clara, moved in the next year, residing in the neighborhood until 1915, when they moved to Fair Lane, their estate in Dearborn. During the time that Ford lived in Boston–Edison, his introduction of the Model T, mass production methods, and wage-price theories revolutionized American industry. Henry Ford built a machine shop above the garage, situated behind the house for his son Edsel to support and encourage Edsel's interest in automobile design. A historical marker issued by the State of Michigan, describing the history and significance of the home, is located on the front lawn.

Henry Ford was only the first of many automotive pioneers to live in the Boston–Edison neighborhood. Ford's early business partners and Ford Motor Company stockholders James Couzens and Horace Rackham also built homes near Ford's in Boston–Edison. (Two other Ford stockholders, John Dodge, and Alexander Y. Malcomson, lived in the adjoining Arden Park-East Boston neighborhood.) They were followed by other early and important Ford collaborators such as Peter E. Martin, C. Harold Wills, and Clarence W. Avery. In addition, other pioneers in the early automobile industry such as Walter Briggs Sr. of Briggs Manufacturing Co, four of the Fisher brothers (of Fisher Body), Charles Lambert of Regal Motor Car Co., John W. Drake from Hupp Motor Car Co., and William E. Metzger from Cadillac and E-M-F. likewise built homes in Boston–Edison.

Other prominent Detroit businessmen lived in Boston–Edison neighborhood during the early years of the neighborhood, including Sebastian S. Kresge (founder of the S.S. Kresge Company—later Kmart), Benjamin Siegel (founder of a major early clothing store), and J. L. Webber (nephew of J. L. Hudson). Additional notable early residents included conductor Ossip Gabrilowitsch and his wife Clara Clemens, Detroit Tigers owner Frank Navin, Detroit Tigers player Ty Cobb (who lived on nearby Atkinson Avenue at Third), historian Clarence M. Burton, and Rabbi Leo M. Franklin.

In the early history of Boston–Edison, three factors influenced the character of the community. The first factor was the tendency for employees and business associates to live in a cluster, similar to early associates of Henry Ford did. In addition, six employees of S.S. Kresge lived in the neighborhood. The second factor was the tendency of several family members to live in close range. In addition to the four Fisher brothers (a fifth brother, Frederic, lived in the adjacent Arden Park-East Boston neighborhood), a number of Benjamin Siegel's relatives lived in the neighborhood, as did a number of Wagner family members (owners of Wagner's bakery). The third factor was the construction of Henry Ford Hospital in 1915, only a mile south of the neighborhood. Twenty-three physicians built homes in Boston–Edison.

== Education ==
Residents are zoned to schools in the Detroit Public Schools district. Durfee K-8, Loving and Thirkell elementary schools serve separate sections of the neighborhood. All of Boston–Edison is zoned to Durfee K-8 for middle school. All residents are zoned to Central High School.

In the past, portions of Boston–Edison were served by Hutchins Middle School.
