= Amos Northup =

American automotive designer

- Born: Amos Earl Northup; October 23, 1889; Bellevue, Ohio
- Died: February 8, 1937 (aged 47); Detroit, Michigan
- Occupation: Automotive designer
- Spouse: Leeta Helen Adams

Amos Earl Northup (October 23, 1889 – February 8, 1937) was an American automotive designer. Regarded as a leader in the field in the United States by the late 1920s, Northup worked for the Wills Sainte Claire, Murray Corporation of America, Hupmobile, American Austin, REO, Willys-Overland, Willys-Knight, and Graham-Paige automakers during his career. His design for the 1932 Graham Bluestreak included a number of revolutionary features in automotive design.

== Career ==
Northup was employed by cabinet maker C. J. Wadsworth in Painesville, Ohio, early in his career. Then he worked as a designer for automaker Wills Sainte Claire under Childe Wills. Northup joined Murray Corporation of America in 1924 where he was in charge of regular production bodies and Ray Dietrich designed their custom bodies. Murray did a lot of body design work for their client companies that did not have internal design departments. The 1928 Hupmobile Century Eight was one of the first designs that Northup influenced at Murray. Murray was given a commission by American Austin in 1929 for a body design of their version of the English Austin that Northup designed but ultimately a competing design by Alexis de Sakhnoffsky for Hayes Body Company was chosen for production. Northup designed the 1931 REO Royale Eight.

By the time Northup was appointed Art Director and Chief Designer for Willys-Overland in March 1928 he was considered a leading automotive stylist of the day. He designed the 1929 Willys Whippet lines and 1929 Willys-Knights and the 1932 Graham Bluestreak which was viewed as a revolution in automotive design with more enclosed fenders and a backward sloping grill and radiator cap moved to under the hood. These features were widely copied. He was working on a successor design for the Graham Blue Streak when he died in 1937.
