= Arden Park–East Boston Historic District =

Historic district in Michigan, United States

- U.S. National Register of Historic Places
- U.S. Historic district
- Michigan State Historic Site
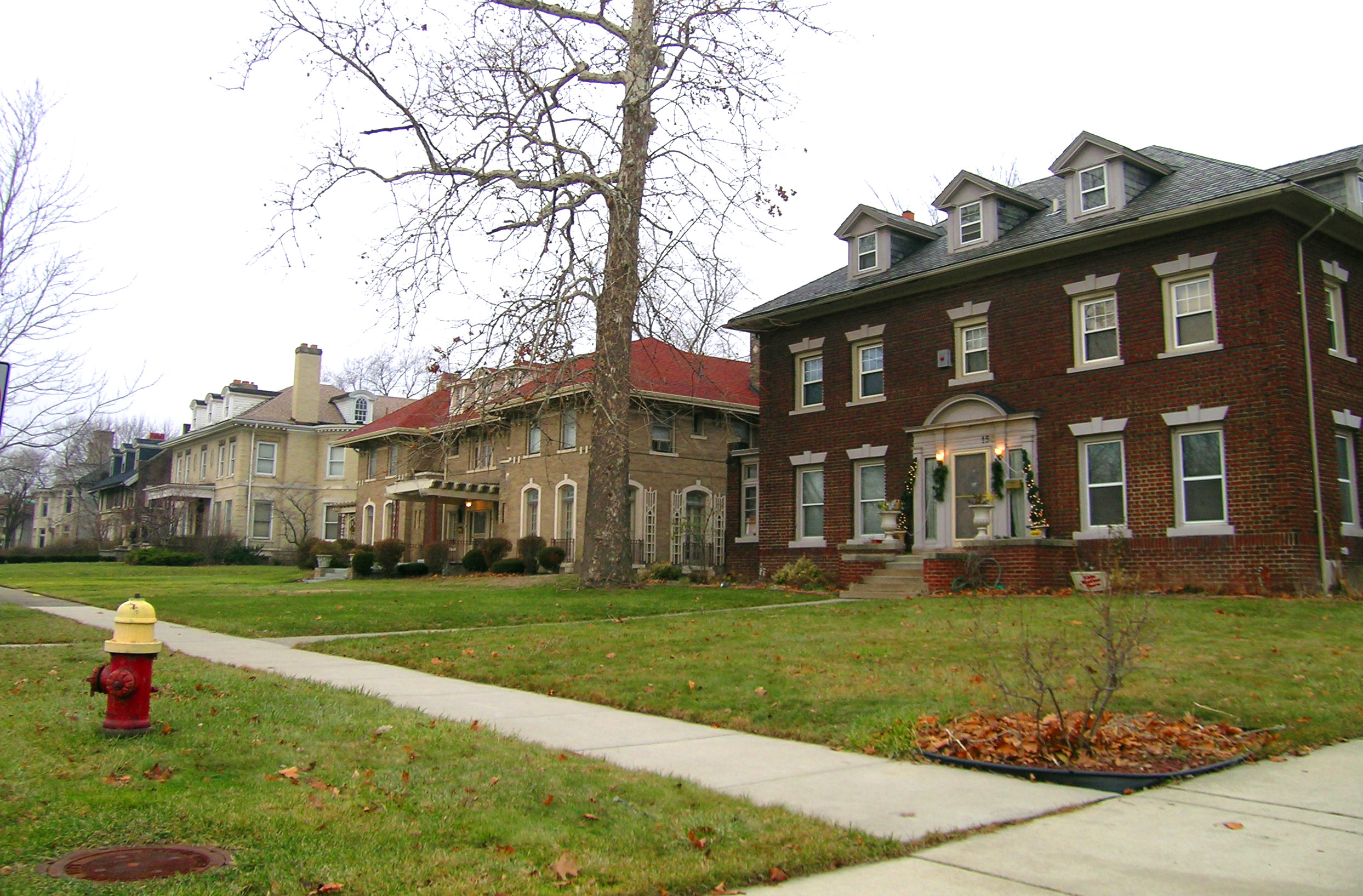
- Interactive map
- Location: Detroit, Michigan, U.S.
- Coordinates: 42°23′17″N 83°04′51″W
- Architect: Multiple
- Architectural style: Late 19th And Early 20th Century American Movements, Late 19th And 20th Century Revivals, Renaissance
- NRHP reference No.: 82002891
- Added to NRHP: April 29, 1982

The Arden Park–East Boston Historic District is a neighborhood located in Detroit, Michigan, bounded on the west by Woodward Avenue, on the north by East Boston Boulevard, on the east by Oakland Avenue, and on the south by Arden Park Boulevard. The area is immediately adjacent to the much larger and better-known Boston-Edison Historic District, which is on the west side of Woodward Avenue, and also close to Atkinson Avenue which is just south of Boston-Edison. There are 92 homes in the district, all on East Boston or Arden Park Boulevards. Arden Park Boulevard and East Boston Boulevard feature prominent grassy medians with richly planted trees and flowers. The setbacks of the homes are deep, with oversized lots. The district was listed on the National Register of Historic Places in 1982.

== History ==
The neighborhood was originally platted in 1892 by Joseph R. McLaughlin and Edmund J. Owen along two streets east of Woodward: specifically, East Boston Boulevard and East Chicago Boulevard. and given the name "McLaughlin and Owen's Subdivision." The lots were spacious to attract the city's wealthier residents. The subdivision was sold twice before being purchased by Max Broock, a prominent real estate developer, in 1910. At Broock's urging, the name of "East Chicago" was changed to "Arden Park," giving the thoroughfare its present name.

Although the neighborhood was first platted in 1892, most of the homes built in the community date to the first two decades of the Twentieth Century. This time period coincided with an economic boom in Detroit, and many newly minted millionaires hired architects to design prestigious dwellings in the neighborhood. Architectural styles represented in Arden Park–East Boston include Italian Renaissance, Colonial Revival, Tudor, Bungalow style and Prairie Style.

Some of the neighborhood's first residents included automotive icons Frederick Fisher and John Dodge, retail pioneer J.L. Hudson, as well as Alexander Y. Malcomson, Clayton and Albert Grinnell. Another retail magnate, Stanley Kresge, Jr. of K-Mart fame, lived in the community. The home of Frederick Fisher, on Arden Park Boulevard, was built in 1918 in the Italian Villa style to the plan of architect George D. Mason. The residence—which comprises nearly 12,000 square feet (1,100 m^{2})—is built entirely of Indiana limestone and features elaborate stone-carvings and ironwork.

211 Arden Park was built in 1914 by Hans Gehrke for renowned jeweler of the time, Robert C.J. Traub (until 1911, the Traub Bros. & Co. jewelry store was located in downtown Detroit where Foran's Grand Trunk Pub is now. The store later moved to the corner of Woodward Avenue and Grand River). The Traub house was featured on the cover of the "House Beautiful" magazine in 1914, and every page of the issue featured photographs of interiors of the house. This source provided an opportunity for maintaining the architecture and interior design of the house in its original state.

The neighborhood's most prominent landmark is the Cathedral of the Most Blessed Sacrament. Next door to the cathedral, is the personal residence of Detroit's Roman Catholic archbishop.

In the 1940s, notable residents included Dr. Dewitt Burton, founder of the Burton Mercy Hospital; Charles Diggs, Sr. first black elected to the Michigan State Senate (father of Charles Diggs, Jr.), and Dr. Haley Bell, dentist, and the first black to receive an FCC license to operate a radio station (WCHB). Rev. Dr. Stephen C. Campbell, Pastor of the Russell St. Baptist Church. Prophet Jones, a prominent African-American Detroit religious leader of the 1950s, lived in a mansion on Arden Park and often addressed his congregation from the front steps of the residence.

Today, the city neighborhood is home largely to professionals, many of whom work in downtown Detroit. The neighborhood is listed on the National Register of Historic Places, the State of Michigan Register of Historic Sites, and is a City of Detroit Designated Historic District.

== Schools ==
Residents are zoned to schools in the Detroit Public Schools district. Residents are assigned to Loving Elementary School, Golightly Education Center (6–8), and Central High School.

== Gallery ==
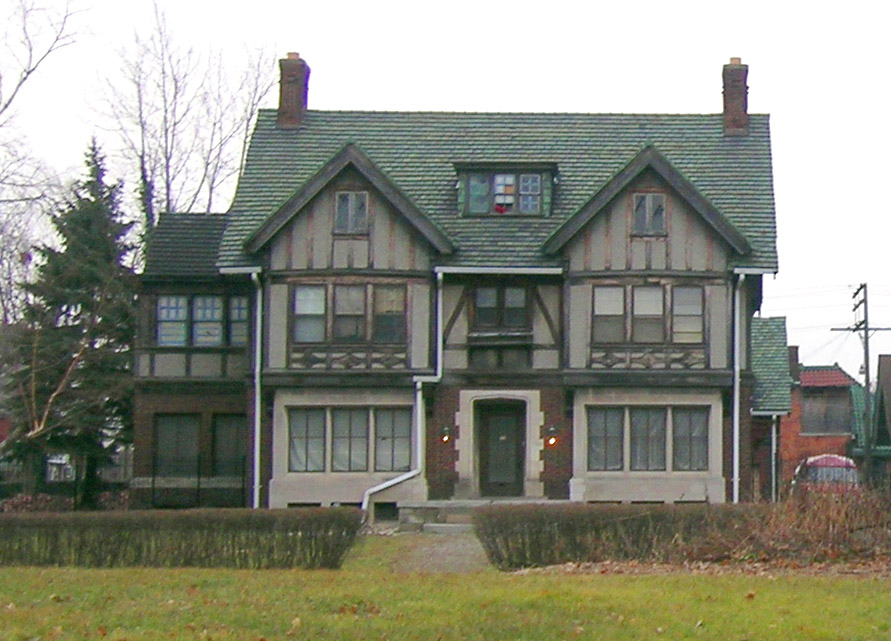
A typical house in the Arden Park–East Boston neighborhood.

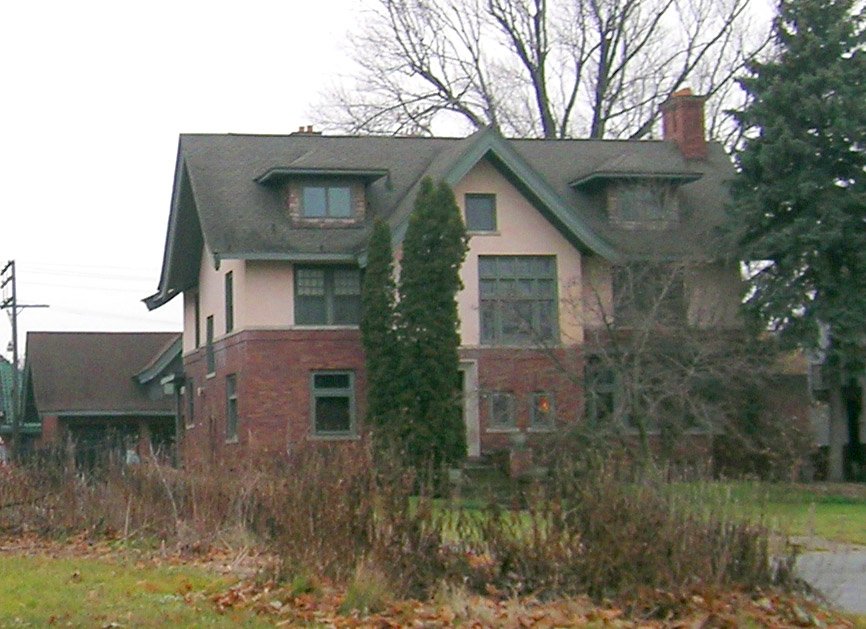
Another typical house in the Arden Park–East Boston neighborhood

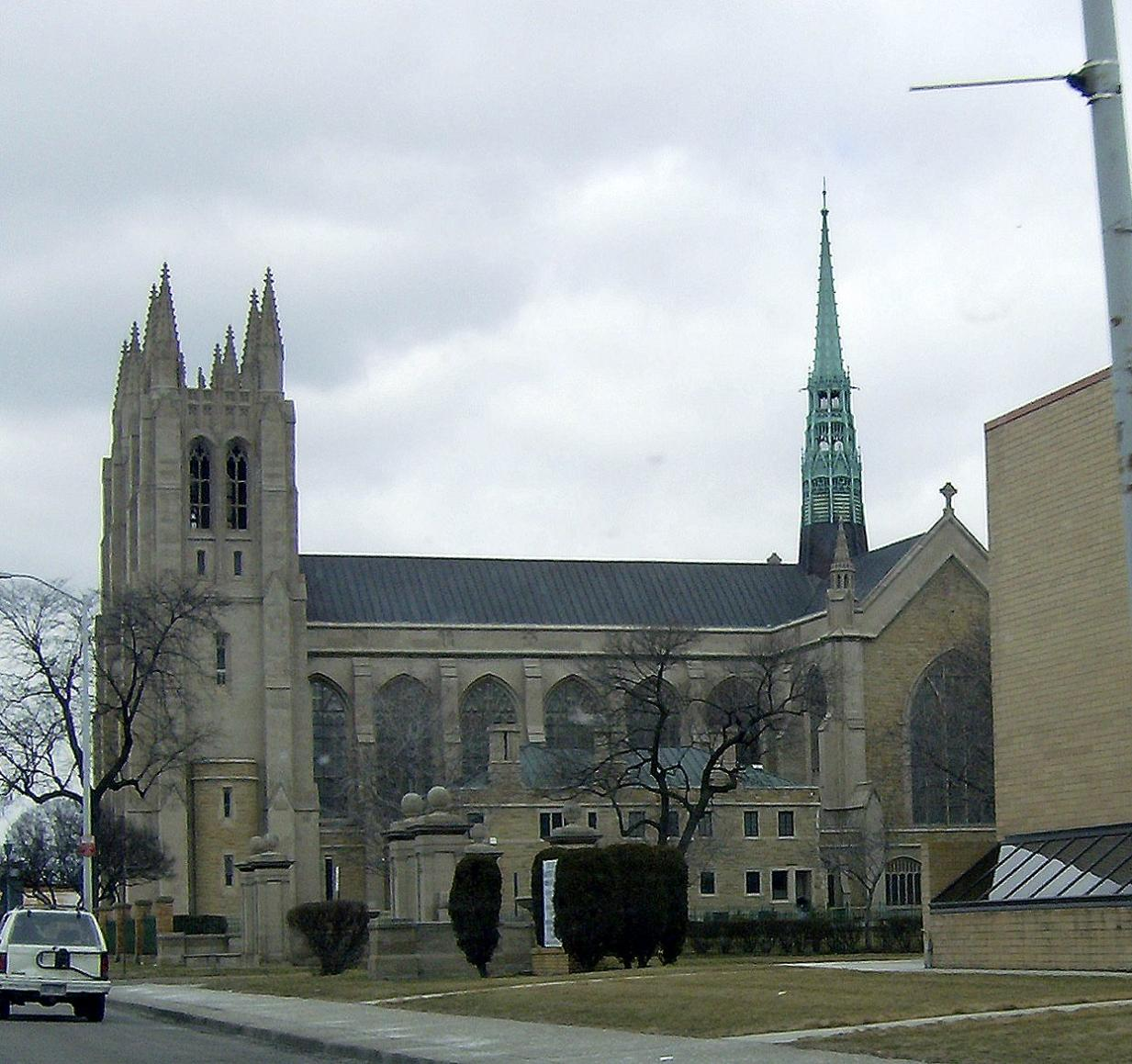
Cathedral of the Most Blessed Sacrament on Woodward Avenue

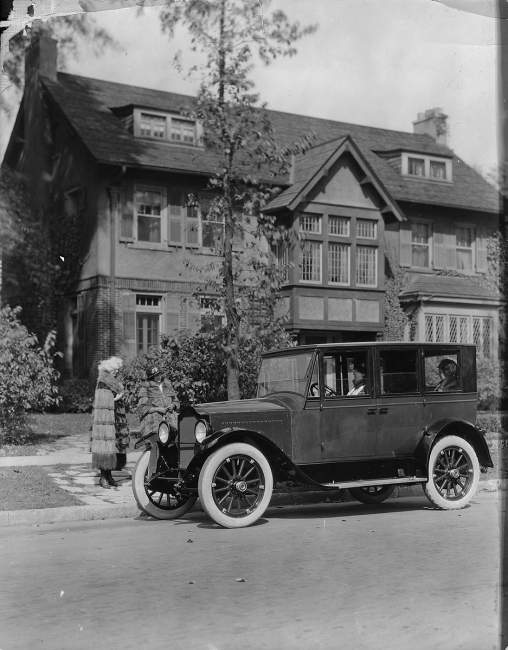
211 Arden Park Blvd, Detroit, 1921. The photo was used in Packard Automotive advertising
