= Clarence W. Avery =

- Born: Clarence Willard Avery; February 15, 1882; Dansville, Michigan, U.S.
- Died: May 13, 1949 (aged 67)
- Education: Ferris State University; University of Michigan
- Occupation: Business executive

Clarence Willard Avery (February 15, 1882 – May 13, 1949) was an American business executive. He was considered a driving force behind Ford Motor Company's moving assembly line, and was president and chairman of auto-body supplier Murray Corporation of America.

== Early life ==
Clarence Avery was born in Dansville, Michigan in 1882. After graduating from high school, he continued his education at Ferris Institute (now Ferris State University) and then at the University of Michigan, completing a two-year course in manual training (the precursor to today's vocational education). He taught at a rural school for a year, and then, in 1902, became the head of manual training in the Battle Creek public schools.

While in Battle Creek, Avery married Lura Warner. The couple eventually had two daughters, Eloise and Anabel. The next year, Avery accepted the post of principal at the Michigan Manual Training School in Ishpeming, Michigan. He spent three years in Ishpeming, then, in 1907, moved to Detroit to become head of manual training at Detroit University School.

== Ford Motor Company ==
In Detroit, one of Avery's pupils was a teenaged Edsel Ford; the young Ford was taken with Avery's mechanical ingenuity. In 1912, Avery casually mentioned to Edsel his desire to enter the automobile business. Edsel introduced Avery to his father, Henry Ford. The elder Ford immediately hired Avery as Charles E. Sorensen's assistant at his Highland Park plant. Sorenson put Avery through an extensive eight-month training course, where he worked in every phase of production at the plant, learning the system.

With that experience, Avery's first large project was the establishment of a moving assembly line at the plant. The assembly line project was worked on by a number of Ford's top men, including C. Harold Wills, Peter E. Martin, and Charles Ebender in addition to Avery and Sorenson. Although credit for the moving assembly line can't be pinned to one individual, those who took part acknowledged Avery as the guiding light of the project, and he became Ford's time study expert. By the end of 1913, the project had reduced assembly time for a Model T from 12.5 man-hours down to 2.7 man-hours. Later improvements reduced that time to only 1.5 man-hours.

Avery soon had a reputation for himself as a problem-solver, and was eventually promoted to Ford's chief development engineer. He continued work on Ford's assembly line, designing operations for sub-assemblies leading into the final assembly. In 1918, Ford assigned Avery to the task of increasing the clarity of automotive glass. Avery experimented with a novel procedure of pouring molten glass onto a moving table, and by 1921 Ford had a system in place. In 1920, Avery was put in charge of Ford's iron and lumber operations in northern Michigan.

In 1922, Ford purchased Lincoln, and Avery worked closely with Edsel Ford to Fordize the Lincoln design and manufacture. This cooperation continued until 1927. In 1927, many operations were transferred to the Rouge plant. Top Ford management, headed by Sorensen, was not receptive to Avery, and he decided to leave Ford.

== Murray Corporation ==
In January 1927, the financially struggling Murray Auto Body was re-organized into the Murray Corporation of America. Anticipating a potentially large contract from Ford, then retooling for the Model A, Murray President William R. Wilson recruited Avery as chief engineer. Sensing opportunity, Avery joined Murray. Within a year, Avery was president of the firm and chairman of its board of directors.

Avery steered Murray for the rest of his life. The company supplied Ford with quasi-custom bodies for the Model A, as well as custom bodies for Lincoln cars. In addition, Murray built bodies for other manufacturers such as Chrysler, Hupmobile, Reo, Dodge, Peerless, Packard, Hudson, and Essex. The company struggled during the Great Depression, losing money in 1931–1934. However, Ford, with an eye to keeping one of its major suppliers afloat, helped the company out with larger contracts and allowed Murray to use some Ford-owned dies. As a result, Murray posted a profit in 1935, and kept in business throughout the Depression.

At the beginning of World War II, Murray Corporation of America was well-positioned to fulfill military contracts and Avery steered the company into the production of airplane wings and other components. The company's workforce increased to over 13,000 employees, and Murray produced parts for the B-17 and B-29 bombers, the A-20 light bomber, and the P-47 fighter/bomber. Near the end of the war, Avery started to solicit Ford and Kaiser-Frazer, to develop Murray's post-war business.

In 1944, the University of Michigan presented Avery with an honorary Doctor of Engineering degree. In 1948, Avery gave up his position as president of Murray, but continued as its chairman.

On May 13, 1949, Avery suffered a heart attack and died at home. In 1990, he was inducted into the Automotive Hall of Fame for his contributions to the moving assembly line.
