= Walbri Hall =

- U.S. National Register of Historic Places
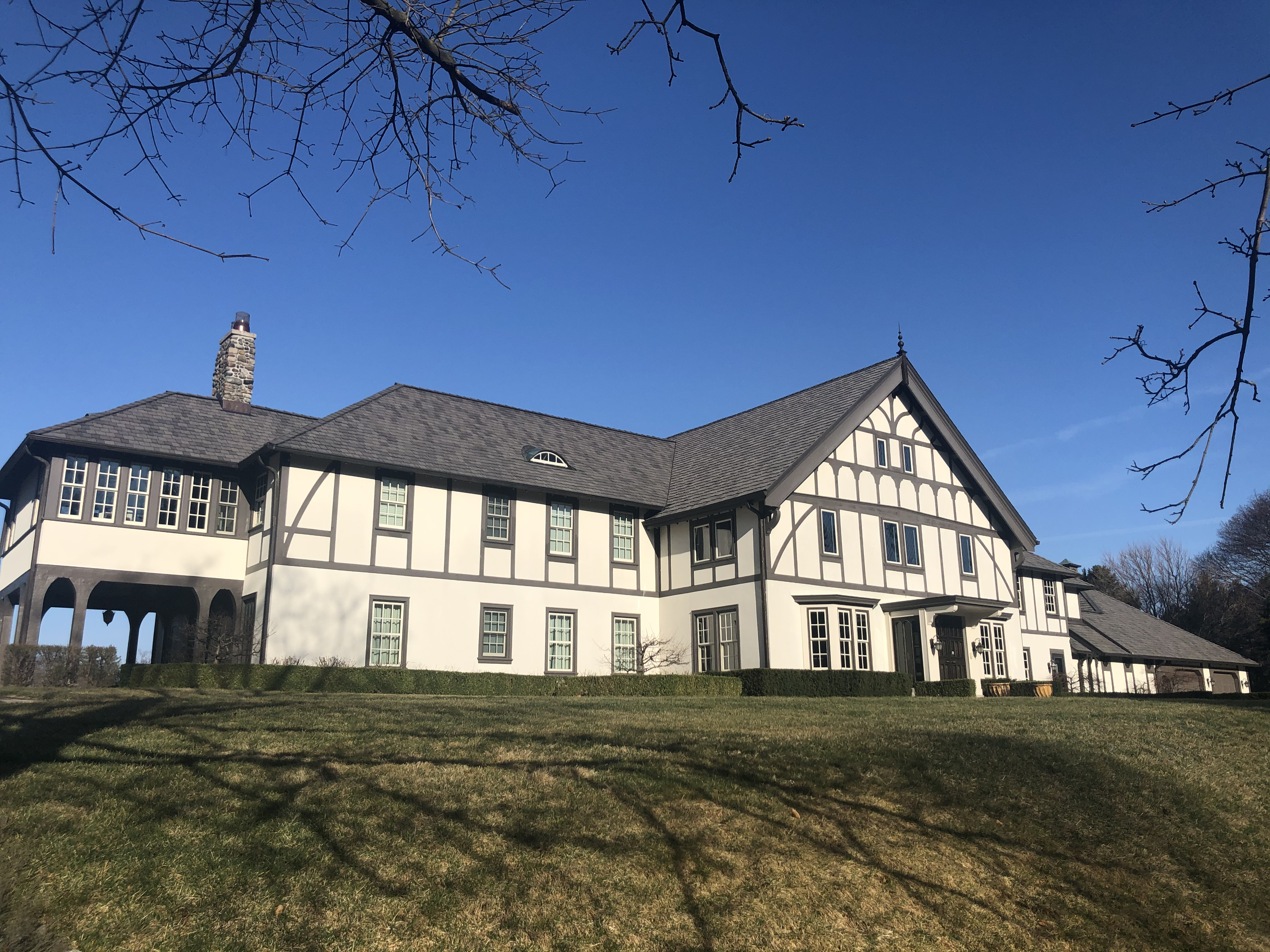
- Interactive map showing the location of Walbri Hall
- Location: 3570 Walbri Dr. Bloomfield Hills, Michigan
- Coordinates: 42°35′20″N 83°13′24″W
- Area: 2.71 acres (1.10 ha)
- Built: 1925
- Architect: Charles Kotting
- Architectural style: Tudor Revival
- NRHP reference No.: 100007209
- Added to NRHP: January 6, 2022

Walbri Hall is the main house of a former country estate, built for Detroit industrialist (and Detroit Tigers owner) Walter O. Briggs. The house is located at 3570 Walbri Drive in Bloomfield Hills, Michigan. It was listed on the National Register of Historic Places in 2022.

== History ==
In the early 1900s, Bloomfield Hills became the home of many affluent families from nearby Detroit. In the early 1920s, Walter O. Briggs, owner of Briggs Manufacturing Company, purchased 67 acres in Bloomfield Hills for his country estate. He retained Charles Kotting to design residential buildings on the estate. Kotting had previously designed Brigg's mansion in the Boston-Edison neighborhood in Detroit. Walbri Hall (named using the first three letters of Walter Briggs's first and last names) was completed in 1925. Briggs and his family used the house as a summer estate, and Briggs also hosted social and business functions there.

After Briggs died in 1952, his children inherited the estate. They subdivided the acreage, part of which now houses the Sacred Heart Academy school in Bloomfield Hills. This left a little over 2-1/2 acres surrounding Walbri Hall, with over a 100-foot rolling backyard drop to a 15-acre lake. The home is over 10,000 sq. ft. with a 40 ft. high, 2200 sq. ft. great hall, containing a cantilevered balcony made of German oak that housed a beautiful library. The home has hosted many prominent events through the years, including the 1982 Michigan Republican Gubernatorial debate. The building itself went through a succession of owners, including Dr. Ben and Audrey Weinberg, a local interior designer and dentist who bought and renovated the home in 1975 and then Wilhelm Kast, a renowned Michigan entrepreneur who also owned American Spoon Foods. It was subsequently purchased and beautifully renovated again by the present owners, James and Olga Mackenzie, in 2011.

== Description ==
Walbri Hall is a two-story wood-framed Tudor Revival house built on a small rise above two spring-fed lakes. The house was built with a cross-shaped footprint; this has been somewhat altered by the addition of a modern garage on one end of the house. The house sits on a concrete block foundation, with a stuccoed first story and a half-timbered second story. The rafters above have exposed ends, and a composite roof is similar in form to the original wooden version. The house has two large fieldstone chimneys and original leaded glass windows in the upper story.

The front facade has a central projecting gabled section with wings to each side. The central section is three bays wide with ornate timbering. An enclosed entryway, added in the late 20th century, is in the center, flanked by bay windows. The upper floor has four window bays, with the central two paired over the entry door. The wings are each four bays wide.

== See also ==
- National Register of Historic Places listings in Oakland County, Michigan
