= Wills Sainte Claire =

Defunct American motor vehicle manufacturer

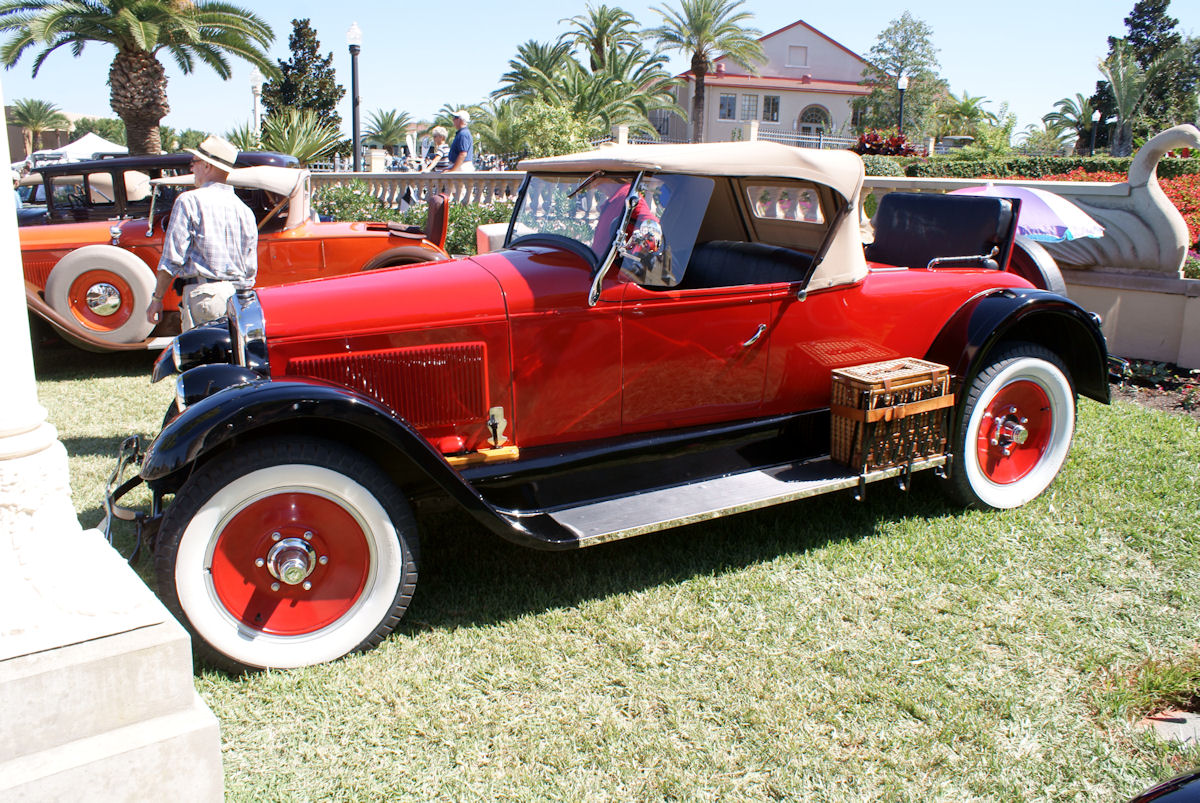
1921 Wills Sainte Claire Roadster

Wills Sainte Claire was an American automobile brand manufactured by C. H. Wills and Company, in Marysville, Michigan, from 1921 to 1927. Childe Harold Wills, the company founder, was a perfectionist and his automobile company focused on very high quality cars.

As a metallurgical engineer, Wills was an aide of Henry Ford. Wills introduced vanadium steel for the production of the Ford Model T; it was the first large scale application of the alloy. Wills was also a designer and is credited with designing the script "Ford Blue Oval" emblem that the company uses to this day.

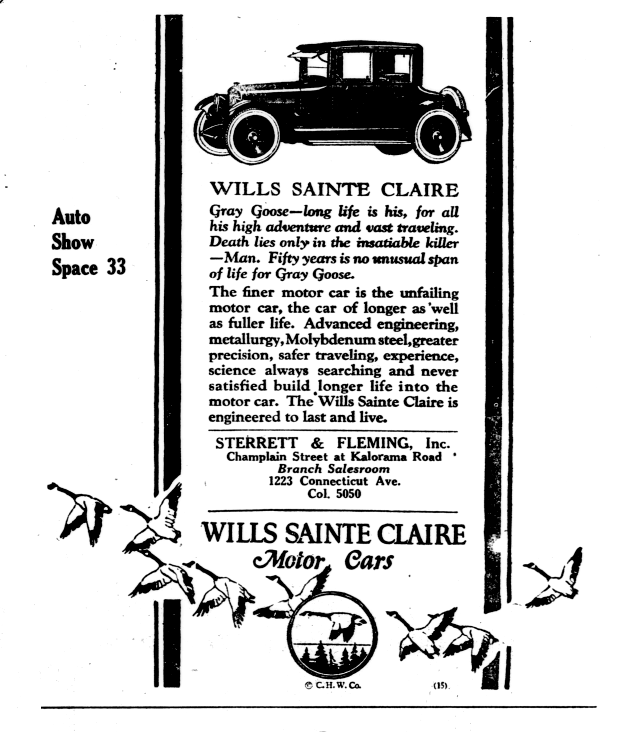
1923 ad for the company and their presence at the 1923 Washington DC Autoshow.

Wills left Ford on his own terms and with a severance package of more than 1.5 million dollars, which he used to establish his own car company he originally named "Wills Saint Clair" – Wills for himself and "Saint Clair" for the Saint Clair River near his new factory. Wills later added the extra e's, thinking that the French spelling elevated the cachet of the product.

The first Wills Sainte Claire rolled off the assembly line in 1921. Production was delayed due to metallurgy issues surrounding the use of molybdenum in castings, which Wills insisted be used in the production of the car in order to ensure its durability. Despite the durability of the cars, once production got underway most of Wills' executive staff abandoned him by 1922 because Wills was known to shut the whole assembly line down if a new and innovative method occurred to him. After going into receivership that year, the company was refinanced by a group of bankers from Boston and reincorporated as Wills Sainte Claire Incorporated in 1923. Automotive designer Amos Northup worked at Wills Sainte Claire until 1924.

Wills cars rode on either 121 in (3,073 mm) or 127 in (3,226 mm) wheelbases and featured either V8 or inline-6-cylinder overhead cam engines. There was also a wide range of body styles - four-passenger roadster; five-passenger Gray Goose special touring car; seven-passenger touring car; 4-door brougham; four-passenger coupe; five-passenger sedan; five-passenger Imperial sedan and town car. Unable to sustain volume sufficient to make a profit, Wills closed the factory in 1927. Wills was later involved in the development of the front-wheel drive Ruxton automobile. The factory was later acquired by Chrysler.

All Wills Sainte Claire automobiles are classified as "Classic Cars" by the Classic Car Club of America. Outside of automotive circles, Wills Sainte Claire is best known for its Canada goose logo. Wills chose it because he felt the Canada goose was the ultimate traveler of the world.

== Wills Ste. Claire Auto Museum ==
In 2002, volunteers opened the Wills Ste. Claire Auto Museum at 2408 Wills Street in Marysville, Michigan. It is open the second Sunday of every month. Of the approximately 80 Wills Sainte Claire cars believed to exist (of approximately 12,000 manufactured), eleven are on display, plus several unrestored Wills Sainte Claire cars stored awaiting restoration.
