= Atkinson Avenue Historic District =

Thoroughfare in Detroit, Michigan

Coordinates: 42.3794°N 83.0939°W

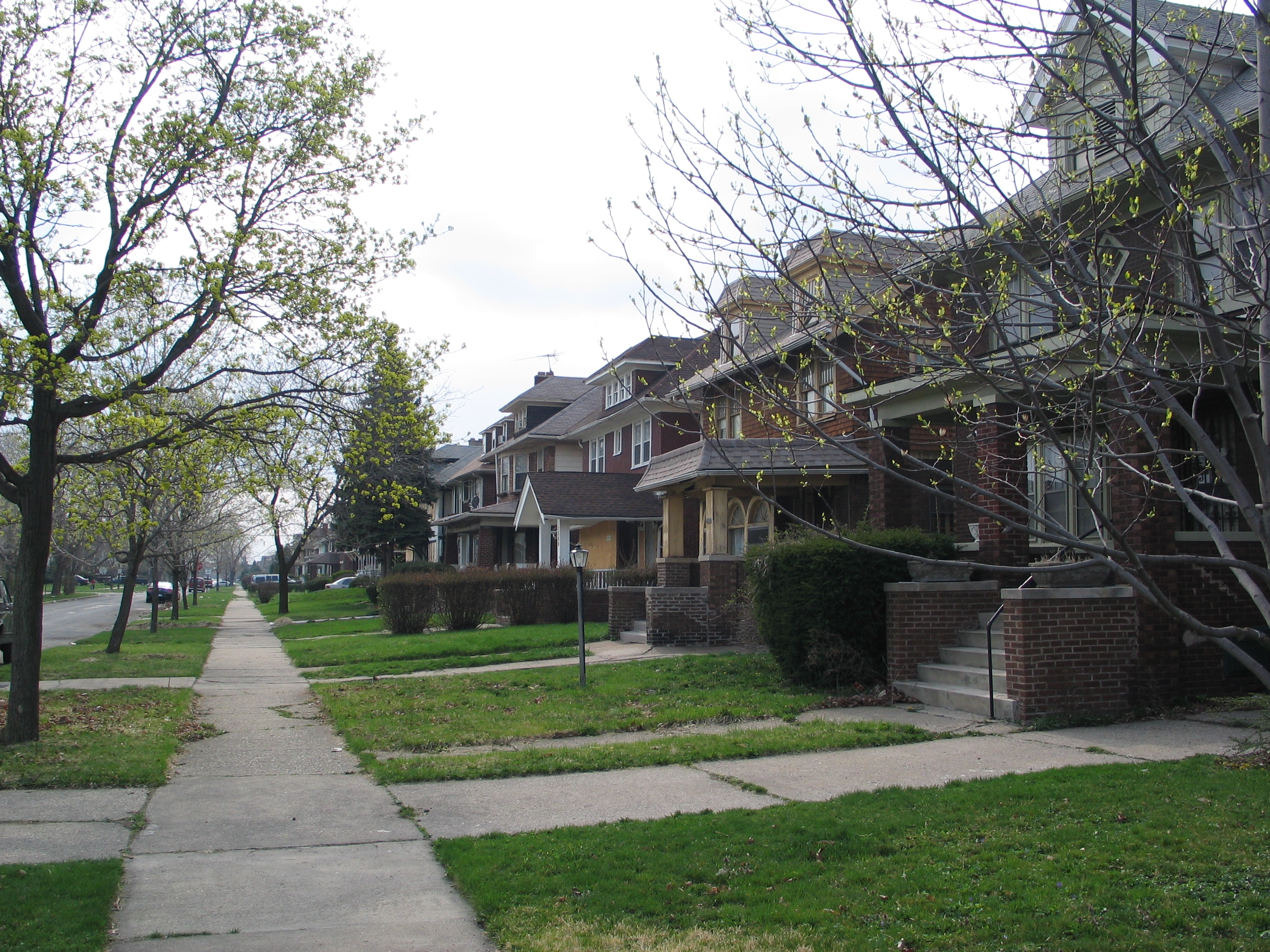
Atkinson Avenue Historic District in Detroit. Pictured is the block of Atkinson between Byron Avenue and Woodrow Wilson Avenue, looking toward the west. Photographed in 2007

Atkinson Avenue is an east–west street located in the geographic heart of the city of Detroit, Michigan. The historic district had 225 houses in 2010.

Atkinson Avenue was named in honor of William Francis Atkinson. Held prisoner by the Confederacy, Atkinson courageously escaped and rose to the rank of captain before leaving the service in 1886. Captain Atkinson had a commendable war record. Long after the Civil War, he studied law and was admitted to the bar.

In its entirety, Atkinson Avenue begins at Woodward Avenue and travels westerly to Linwood Avenue, where Atkinson Avenue abruptly stops. Atkinson Avenue resumes at Savery Avenue and continues traveling westerly to its final terminus at McQuade Avenue, just west of Dexter Boulevard. For a time, during the 1890s, that portion of Atkinson Avenue situated between 12th Street and "Crawford" Street (later renamed "Hamilton"), actually constituted a part of the boundary of Detroit's city limits.

Atkinson Avenue consists of parts of six subdivisions, specifically Joy Farm, Lewis Park, Jackson Park, Voigt Park, Boston Boulevard, and Guerold's Subdivision. The adjacent Boston-Edison Historic District is composed of the same subdivisions. The Atkinson Avenue Historic District, however, only includes those six blocks of Atkinson Avenue situated between the John C. Lodge Expressway and Linwood Avenue. The Atkinson Avenue Historic District, as it exists today, was established by action of the Detroit City Council in March 1984 (Journal City Council 262 66, passed March 7, 1984, and effective March 26, 1984). All remaining portions of Atkinson Avenue are not within the boundaries of any historic district.

Of those portions not already within the city limits, the remaining land in the vicinity was incorporated into the City of Detroit by 1915. The peak building time for the area was 1915 to 1925, which corresponded to the construction of Henry Ford Hospital—several blocks to the south—in 1915. The neighborhood became a middle-class area of very nice homes. Doctors, poets, ministers, real estate agents, salesmen and a newspaper writer were among the community's first residents. The first and only Poet Laureate of Michigan, Edgar Guest lived at 1500 Atkinson, and one of the thoroughfare's most well-known residents was the renowned baseball player Ty Cobb who resided in a brick dwelling at the intersection of Atkinson and Third (not within the boundaries of the historic district).

Each of the aforementioned subdivisions had similar building restrictions. Homes were to be built 30 feet from the front of the lot line and building materials were to be solid brick, stone, cement, stone veneer or stucco. Few dwellings were of wooden frame construction. All residences were to have full basements. Most houses are of the "basic box" or "four square" types with Mediterranean, Colonial or Tudor elements and are two stories tall with an attic. If a home had an ornamental fence, it was to be of no more than five feet in height.

Cost of construction was also specified to be between $3,000 to $4,000. The majority of homes were to be single-family residences. Unlike other neighborhoods within the city, Atkinson Avenue residents did not file deed restrictions prohibiting non-Caucasians from purchasing homes.

== History ==
When Atkinson Avenue was first established, it did not prohibit African-Americans and Jewish people from living there, making it one of only a few middle-class areas to allow those groups to live there.

In 2010 about 25% of the houses in Atkinson Avenue Historic District were unoccupied and boarded up.

== Education ==
Detroit Public Schools operates the schools serving Atkinson Avenue district.

Durfee K-8 and Thirkell elementary schools serve separate sections of the neighborhood for elementary school. All of the historic district is zoned to Durfee K-8 for middle school. All residents are zoned to Central High School.

Previously Hutchins Middle School served portions of Atkinson Avenue Historic District.
