= Charles E. Sorensen =

American businessman (1881–1968)

- Born: Carl Emil Sørensen; September 7, 1881; Copenhagen, Denmark
- Died: August 13, 1968 (aged 86); Bethesda, Maryland, United States

Charles Emil Sorensen (7 September 1881 – 13 August 1968) was a Danish-American principal of the Ford Motor Company during its first four decades. Like most other managers at Ford at the time, he did not have an official job title, but he served functionally as a patternmaker, foundry engineer, mechanical engineer, industrial engineer, production manager, and executive in charge of all production.

By the end of his career, he had become an officer of the company: a vice president and a director. Speaking figuratively, he saw himself during most of his career as "a viceroy ruling the production province of the Ford empire," and at the end as a "regent," who managed the company during the "interregnum" between the reigns of Henry Ford I and Henry Ford II.

== Early life ==
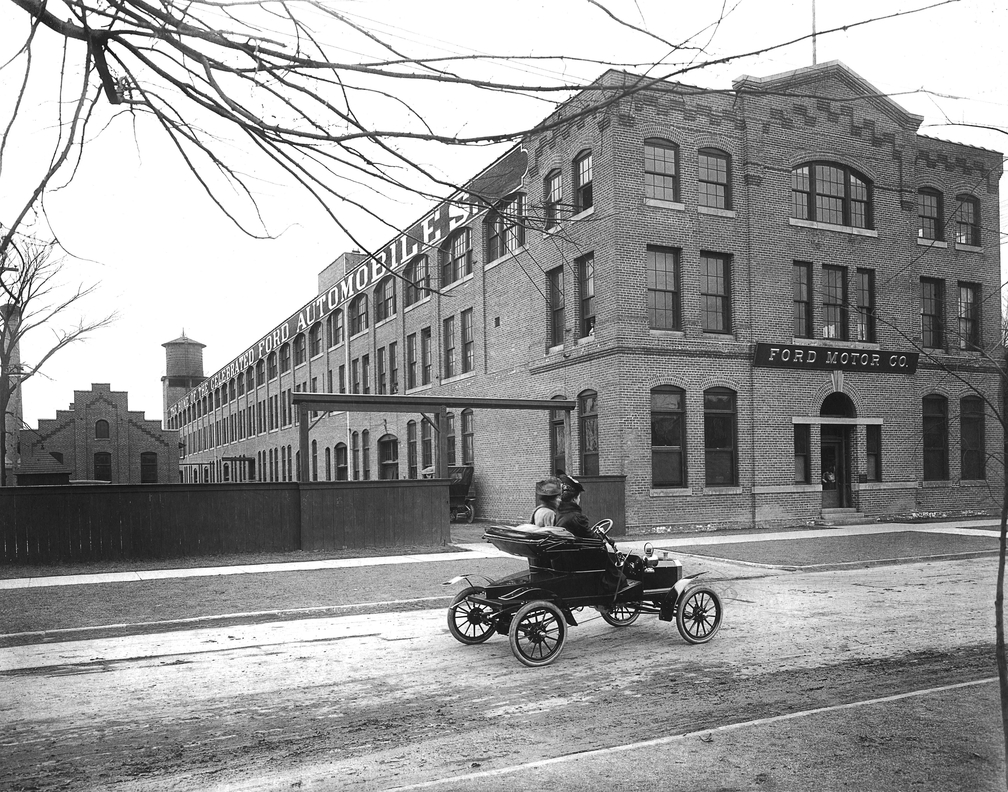
Ford Piquette Avenue Plant

Sorensen was baptised Carl Emil Sørensen. He emigrated from Denmark to the United States with his parents in 1885, when he was four. He first worked as a surveyor's assistant and then apprenticed as a patternmaker and foundryman at the Jewett Stove Works in Buffalo, New York. The family moved to Detroit in 1900.

== Early career ==
In 1900, the family moved to Detroit, and while working at a foundry in Detroit, he met Henry Ford. In 1905, he accepted a job as a patternmaker at Ford Motor Company. By 1907, he was head of the pattern department. He translated Ford's ideas, which came to him in the form of simple sketches or descriptions, into prototypes and into the patterns from which the parts would be cast.

Sorensen (with others, notably Walter Flanders, Clarence Avery, and Ed Martin) is credited with developing the first automotive assembly line, having formulated the idea of moving a product (for cars, that would be in the form of the chassis) through multiple workstations. His innovations were widely applied to the mass production of complex products, which average people could afford.

One Sunday in 1910, at the Ford Piquette Avenue Plant, Sorensen asserted that he and another Ford executive, Charles Lewis, tested his idea. Apparently, by the end of the day, he had determined that moving a car in a straight line from one end of the factory to the other, with parts added along the way by specialized workers performing repetitive tasks, with the stockrooms also placed strategically along the line, was the most efficient and therefore the cheapest way to build an automobile. To prove his theory, he then towed an automobile chassis on a rope over his shoulders through the Ford plant while others added the parts.

== Later life ==
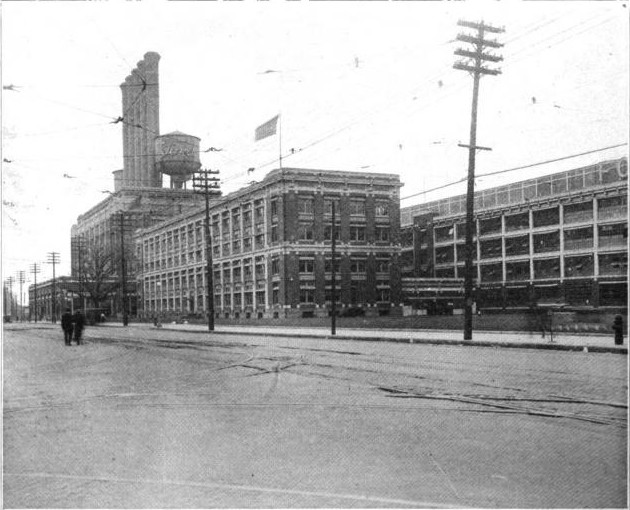
Highland Park Ford Plant

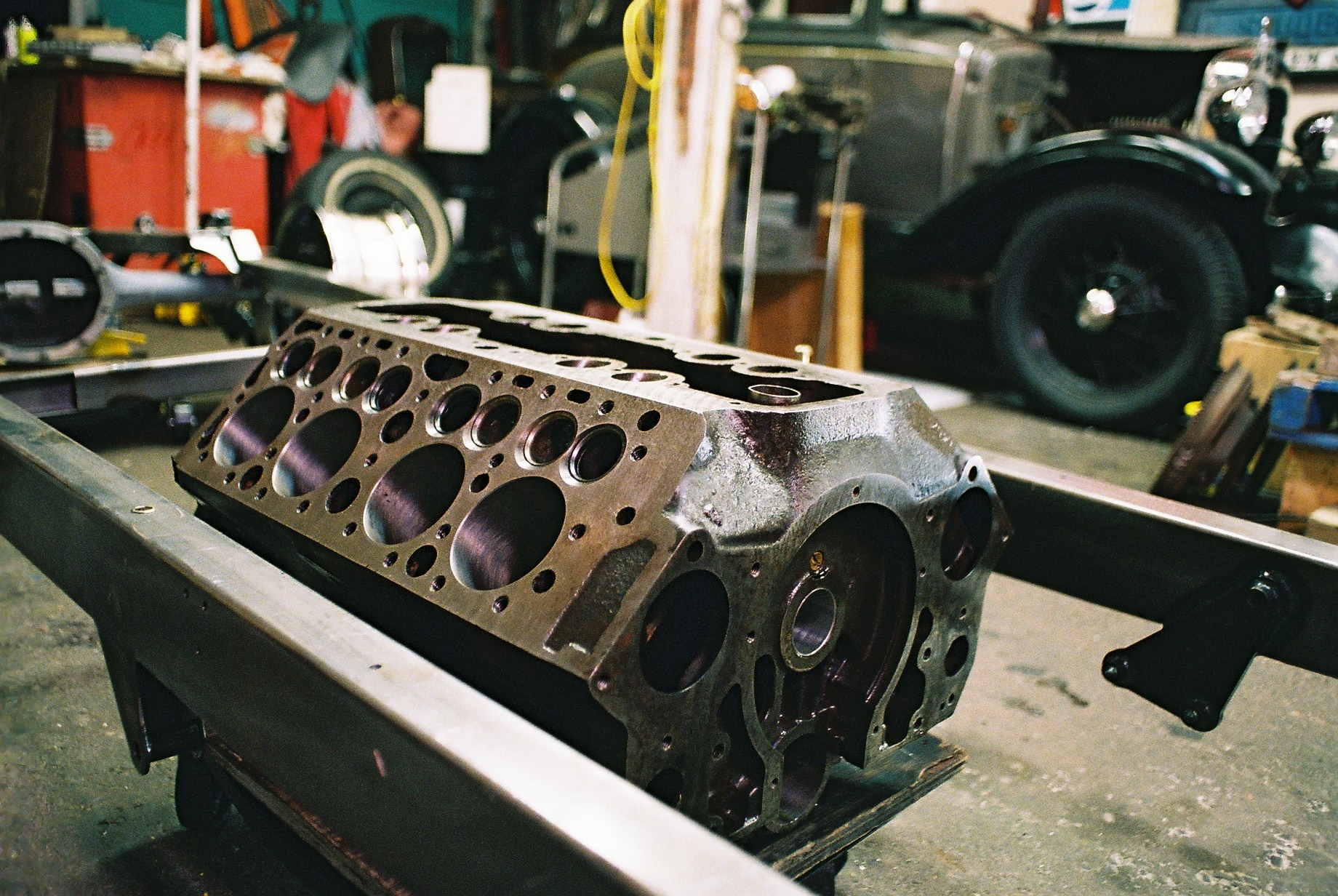
Flathead engine block

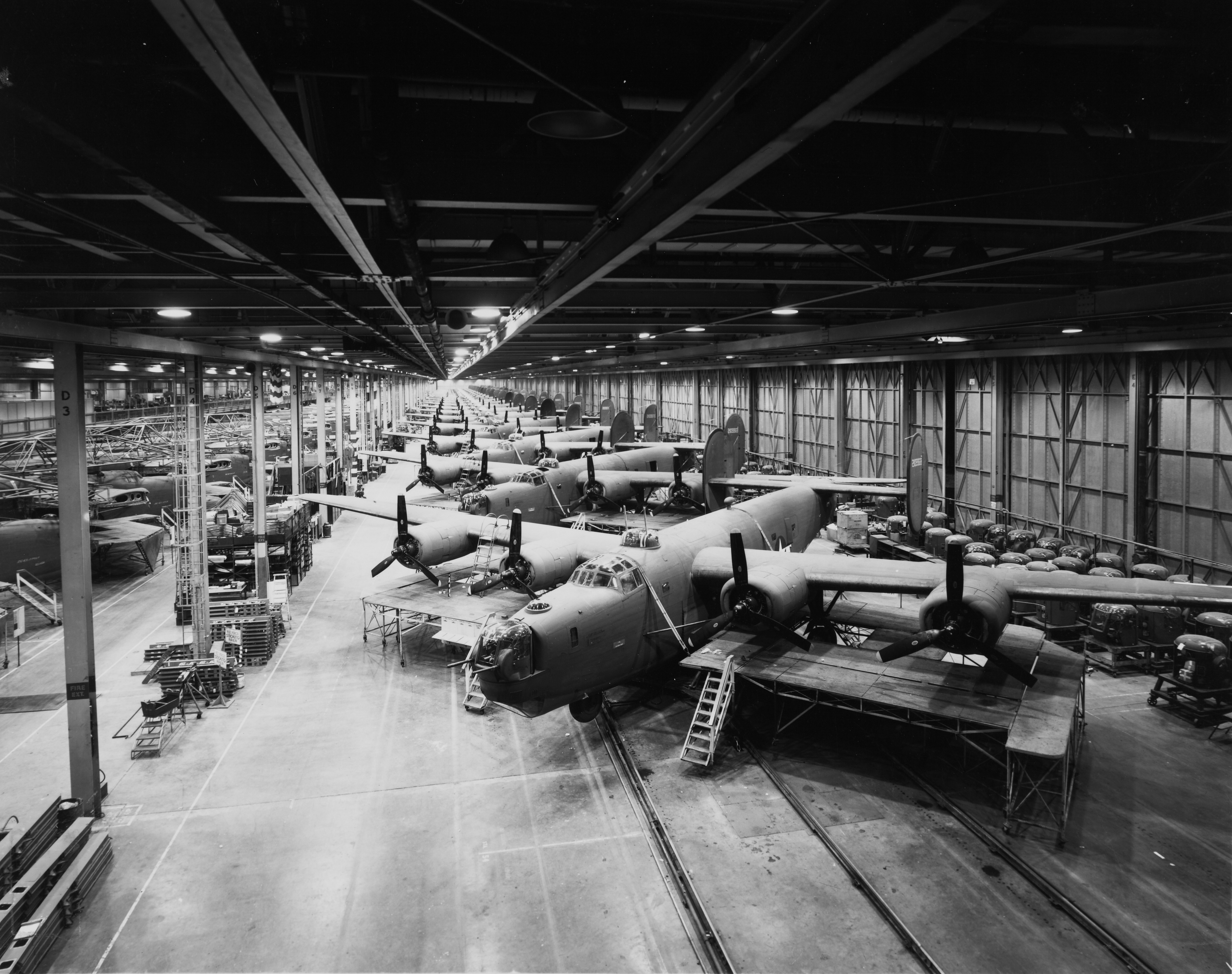
B-24 assembly line at Willow Run

Sorensen was a major contributor to the launch of the Highland Park Ford Plant in 1910, where he was second in command to production chief Peter (Ed) Martin. He then helped with the development of the Fordson tractor and modernization of Edsel Ford's Lincoln when it was purchased by Ford from Henry M. Leland in 1922. Following transfer of auto assembly to the Rouge in the late 1920s, he was a "key leader" in manufacturing as number two man to Ed Martin, who was made vice president of manufacturing in 1924. He was manager of production planning and development. "Ed Martin, who was plant superintendent, and I practically lived at the Rouge." It has been said he considered himself the "Head of Production," and Henry Ford's "right-hand man," but he was only one of at least six company leaders claiming that distinction. (Ford's practice of telling his men to "[j]ust go out there and run the plant […] [a]nd don't worry about titles" contributed to these variations in viewpoints.)

Sorensen's help in innovating foundry practice for mass production earned for him from Henry Ford the nickname of "Cast-Iron Charlie" during the company's first decade, when he invented (or at least independently reinvented) the use of metal patterns, instead of wood ones, to withstand the huge number of moldmaking cycles needed for mass production and methods of core registration to position the cores accurately without relying on the sand under them to assist in the registration. In 1928 Sorensen joined Henry and Edsel Ford as the three US directors out of seven on the board of Ford's new reorganized independent European operations. During the 1930s, Sorensen was also responsible for production techniques allowing the manufacture of a sophisticated V-8 engine block from a single casting, and using a more automated foundry workflow than ever before. The resulting Ford Flathead engine continued in production until 1953; a derivative design was used in French military vehicles into the 1990s.

During the early 1940s, Sorensen had responsibility for Ford's defense contracts, including Ford's Jeep and aircraft engines and production of the B-24 Liberator bomber.He led the design of the Willow Run plant. Each B-24 is often described as comprising 488,193 parts.. Late-war publicity put peak output at one aircraft per hour; earlier Consolidated production is commonly given as about one per day. Ford completed 6,792 Liberators at Willow Run and shipped 1,893 knockdown kits to Consolidated and Douglas. In 1930 he was appointed Ridder of the Order of the Dannebrog in 1937 he was appointed Kommandør.

During his career, he was noted for his brilliance in organization and his hard-driving personality, and also for insensitivity to others and an explosive temper. Sorensen's memoirs intended to show how the Ford industrial empire was kept intact and his hard struggle to bring Henry Ford II to the direction of its destinies. After leaving the navy, a 24-year-old Henry Ford II joined company management as a vice-president on December 15, 1943. Sorensen, who had mentored the young Ford, was not offered a major role by him. He requested retirement in December 1943, to be effective January 1, 1944, as previously agreed with the elder Ford in 1941. His retirement was effective on March 13, 1944. He then accepted a position as president of automaker Willys-Overland, presiding over the transition from wartime production back to civilian-market production. Sorensen effectively retired after clashes with the board but retained a title and salary as vice-chairman from 1946 until full retirement in 1950. Willys became Kaiser Jeep and was later acquired by American Motors Corporation (AMC). AMC was later bought out by Chrysler.

He retired in and He had extensive land holdings in (which were seized by the new government after the Cuban revolution). He died on August 28, 1968, at Bethesda Naval Hospital in Maryland. He is buried in Miami Beach, Florida. He was preceded in death by his first wife Helen (née Mitchell) Sorensen and son Clifford Sorensen.

He retired in Florida and the US Virgin Islands. Some accounts state that he held land in Cuba later taken after 1959; that holding is not documented here by a deed or a Foreign Claims Settlement Commission decision. He died on 13 August 1968 at his summer home in Bethesda, Maryland. He is buried at Woodlawn Park North Cemetery and Mausoleum in Miami. He was preceded in death by his first wife, Helen (née Mitchell) Sorensen (d. 1959), and their son Clifford. He married Edith Thompson in Palm Beach on 17 January 1960.

== Sources ==
- Bryan, Ford R. (1993). Henry's Lieutenants. ISBN 0-8143-2428-2.
- Herman, Arthur (2012). Freedom's Forge: How American Business Produced Victory in World War II. New York, NY: Random House. ISBN 978-1-4000-6964-4.
- Hounshell, David A. (1984), From the American System to Mass Production, 1800–1932: The Development of Manufacturing Technology in the United States, Baltimore, Maryland: Johns Hopkins University Press, ISBN 978-0-8018-2975-8, LCCN 83016269, OCLC 1104810110
- Sorensen, Charles E. (1956), My Forty Years with Ford, New York: W. W. Norton, LCCN 56010854, OCLC 912748. Various republications, including ISBN 9780814332795.
- Sorensen, Charles M. (great grandson).
- Ohno, Taiichi (1988), Toyota Production System: Beyond Large-Scale Production, Productivity Press, ISBN 0-915299-14-3.
- New York Times, 14 August 1968, “Charles E. Sorensen, 86, Dead; Henry Ford’s Production Chief.”
- “Chas E. Sorensen,” Dansk Biografisk Leksikon.
- “Mooney for Willys,” TIME, 28 January 1946.
