= C. Harold Wills =

American engineer and businessman (1878–1940)

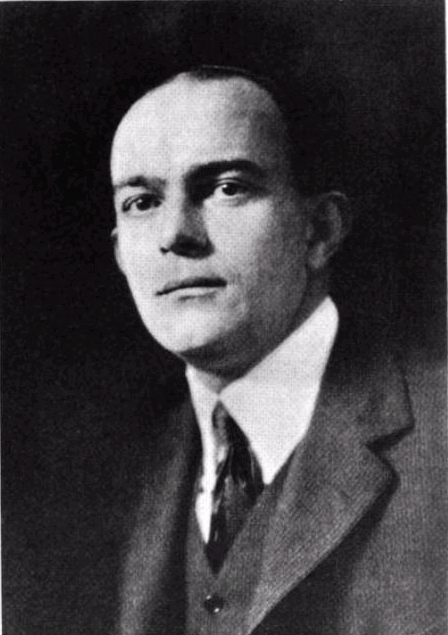
- C. Harold Wills, c. 1922
- Born: Childe Harold Wills; June 1, 1878; Fort Wayne, Indiana, U.S.
- Died: December 30, 1940 (aged 62); Detroit, Michigan, U.S.
- Occupations: Businessman, engineer

Childe Harold Wills (June 1, 1878 – December 30, 1940) was an American engineer and businessman. He was an early associate of Henry Ford, one of the first employees of the Ford Motor Company, and the chief contributor to the design of the Model T. After leaving Ford, he began his own automobile company, Wills Sainte Claire.

== Early career ==
Wills was born in Fort Wayne, Indiana, in 1878, the youngest child of John C. and Angelina S. Wills. His first name Childe was taken from the poem Childe Harold's Pilgrimage by Lord Byron. Wills hated the name, however, and always went by his middle name Harold or his initials C. H. instead. By 1885, the family had moved to Detroit, Michigan, where Wills finished his schooling. Wills seemed to have an equal interest in commercial art and mechanical engineering; he learned a considerable amount about the latter from his father, a railroad mechanic.

When Wills was 17, he began a four-year apprenticeship as a toolmaker at the Detroit Lubricator Company, where his father worked. At the same time, he took night courses in metallurgy, chemistry and mechanical engineering. After serving his apprenticeship, he moved on to the Boyer Machine Co., later the Burroughs Adding Machine Co., becoming chief engineer in 1901, when he was only 23.

== Ford Motor Company ==
However, Wills was strongly attracted to automobiles, and in 1899 approached Henry Ford, offering to work for him part-time. Wills worked with Ford in the early mornings and late evenings at the Detroit Automobile Company, of which Ford was superintendent. The Detroit Automobile Company was reorganized in 1901 as the Henry Ford Company, and by 1902, Wills was working for Ford full-time, helping him build his 999 and Arrow racers. When Ford started the Ford Motor Company in 1903, Wills went along as chief designer and metallurgist. Although Wills was too poor to afford stock in the new company, Ford offered Wills 10% of Ford's profits.

At Ford, Wills hired Peter E. Martin in 1903. He worked hand-in-hand with Ford on the early Ford models. When Ford planned mass production of cars, Wills saw the importance of lightweight, strong, nickel-chrome vanadium steel to the mass production process. Ford tasked Wills with determining how to produce the necessary quantities of steel. Wills eventually found a mill to produce it, and in 1907 Ford used the alloy in the production of his Model N at the Ford Piquette Avenue Plant.

Wills also contributed heavily to the design of the Ford Model T. Wills is credited with designing the planetary transmission used in the Model T and the detachable cylinder head as well as (with his early interest in commercial art and calligraphy) the calligraphy of the script "Ford" logo that is still in use today. Wills also was given charge of the production of the Liberty engine during World War I.

In 1904, Wills married Mabel Preston. Henry Ford was the best man at their wedding. The couple had a son in 1906 who only survived an hour. They then had two daughters: Virginia, born in 1908, and Josephine, born in 1910. In 1914, Wills married Mary Coyne. He had two sons with Mary: John Harold and Childe Harold Jr.

Although Ford and Wills began as friends, over time the relationship between the two grew frosty, exacerbated by Charles E. Sorensen's dislike for Wills. In 1919, as Ford began buying out his minority shareholders, Wills demanded an accounting of the profit-sharing he had accrued. Ford ultimately provided Wills with a $1.5 million severance package. In addition, Wills had amassed another $4 million from his own shrewd investments in steel firms.

== After Ford ==
With his capital, Wills started his own automobile firm, Wills Sainte Claire. He built a factory just north of Detroit near Marysville, Michigan after scouting the area on his yacht, the Tashmu. Wills incorporated and re-platted the surrounding area of Marysville, moving it from its original location to where the town park is today. The company's first automobile model, the Gray Goose, debuted in 1921, and featured the first recorded instance of back-up lights, an invention that supposedly occurred to Wills due to the number of fire hydrants he had accidentally backed into. The car received a lot of press, but its $3000 cost led to low sales, and the company lost money. Although Wills supported the company, it lost money every year, and Wills shut the doors in 1927. Chrysler bought the plant in 1933.

Wills went on to join Ruxton and eventually consulted at Chrysler as a metallurgist. His various patents also provided a steady income. In 1940, Wills suffered a stroke and died a short time later at Henry Ford Hospital. He is buried at Woodlawn Cemetery, Detroit, Michigan.
