= Peter E. Martin =

Ford production executive

Peter Edmund Martin
- Born: 1882; Wallaceburg, Ontario
- Died: 1944 (aged 61–62); Detroit, Michigan, United States
- Occupation: Business executive
- Employer: Ford Motor Company
- Known for: Ford Motor Company's fifth employee

Peter Edmund Martin (1882–1944) was an American business executive who was a leading early production executive of the Ford Motor Company.

== Career ==
Martin was hired by close Henry Ford associate C. Harold Wills on December 15, 1903, and at that time was the company's fifth employee.

He was placed in charge of the Assembly Department at the Ford Piquette Avenue Plant in January 1906. On October 17, 1906, when Walter E. Flanders was manager of Manufacturing, Ed Martin was promoted to assistant to Thomas S. Walburn in active charge of all manufacturing departments. In January, 1907 he became superintendent under Walburn.

On April 21, 1908, Walter Flanders resigned. Henry Ford called Martin and Charles E. Sorensen into his office and told Martin and Sorensen to go out and run the Piquette Avenue Plant. By 1913, Martin had been officially appointed superintendent of production and Sorensen as his assistant. This began a close association between Martin and Sorensen that lasted over 30 years. Sorensen was also Martin's second in command at the Highland Park Plant and nominally, later at the Rouge Plant although Martin had less influence over Sorenson's actions there.

Edsel Ford became President of the Ford Motor Company in January, 1919. According to an organization chart dated November 1, 1919 Peter E. Martin was General Superintendent. According to Sorensen, in 1920 Peter E. Martin was plant superintendent at the River Rouge complex and Martin and Sorenson both practically lived at the plant. On December 24, 1924, Martin was named vice president in charge of Manufacturing.

On May 5, 1926, Martin offered his resignation to Henry and Edsel Ford as First Vice President of the Ford Motor Company. Martin's stated reason was his belief it would result in better coordination of the executives and the officials of the company. His resignation was not accepted.

On May 31, 1929, Ed Martin signed a contract between the Ford Motor Company and the Supreme Soviet of the National Economy of the USSR for the purpose of building tractors in Russia. Charles Sorensen was a witness.

According to the June 15, 1935 newspaper "Detroit Saturday Night," Peter E. Martin was in charge of the Rouge plant.

Time magazine reported in its January 18, 1937 issue that Henry Ford drew dividends but no salary, while son Edsel's $100,378 was topped by Vice President Peter. E. Martin's $128,008 and Charles Sorensen's $115,100. In 1939 Time reported Edsel's salary at $146,056, Peter E. Martin's at $171,465 and Charles Sorensen's at $166,071. Also it was reported that Ford Motor Company had only three members of the company's board of directors, Henry Ford, son Edsel Ford and Vice President Peter E Martin.

By 1940 according to Nevins and Hill, Decline and Rebirth p242, Henry Ford listened only to Sorensen, P.E. Martin and Harry Bennett. Edsel, of course would get a hearing.

On July 17, 1941, Peter E. Martin resigned for health reasons, and the resignation led to Charles Sorensen being named as his replacement. This was the first time Sorensen held an office of the Ford Motor Company. Notably, neither man was known to have complained of the other in over 30 years. However the more outgoing Sorensen became quite famous while Martin is little known. he died in Henry Ford Hospital in Detroit Michigan from complications of cancer at age 61-62 years
