= Jeep Cherokee =

Line of American vehicles sold by Jeep under various vehicle classes

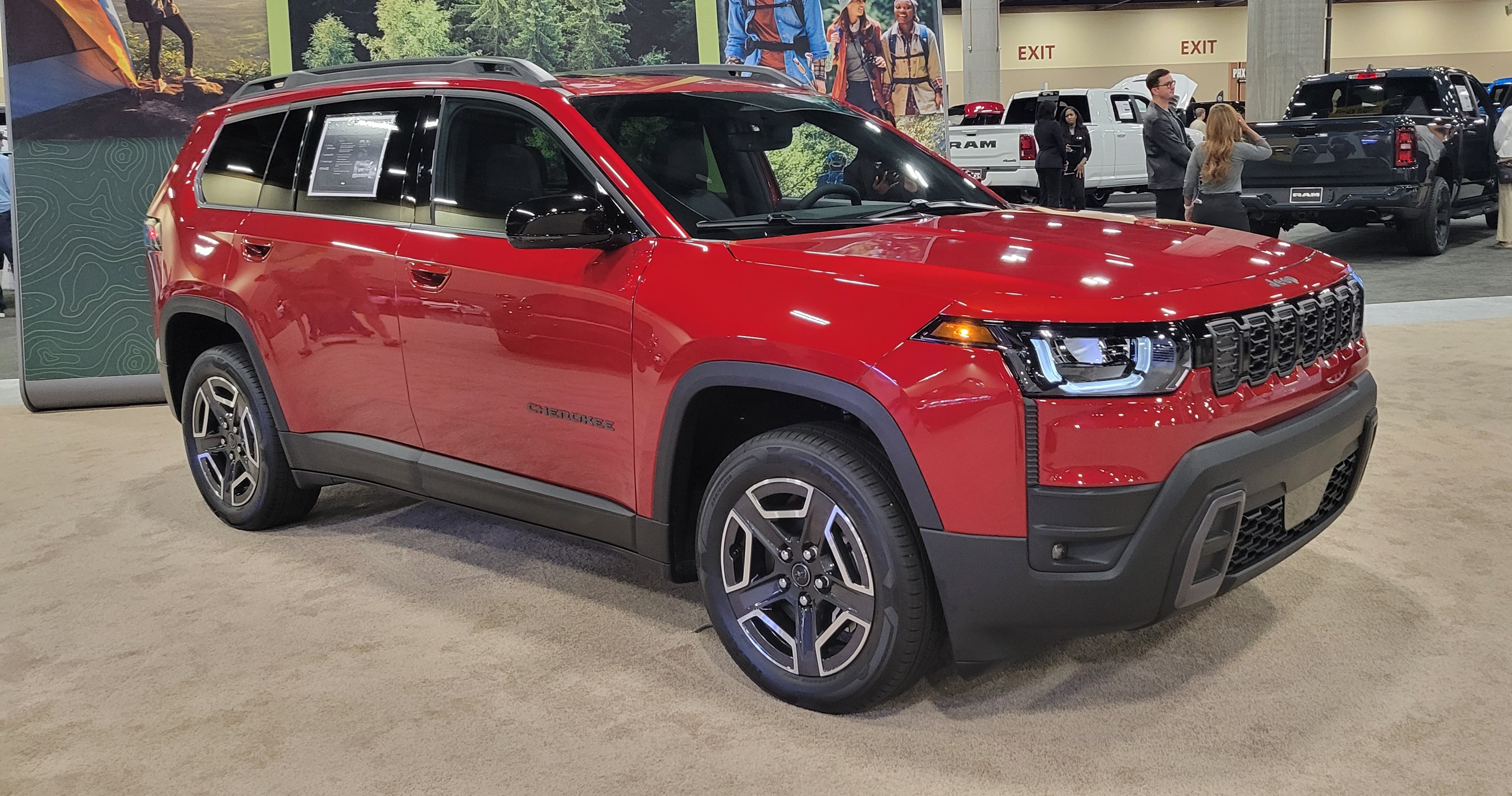
- Sixth generation (KM)

Overview
- Manufacturer: Jeep (Note: American Motors Corporation (1974–1987); Chrysler Corporation (1988–1998); DaimlerChrysler (1999–2007); Chrysler LLC (2008–2009); Chrysler Group LLC (2010–2014); FCA US LLC (2015–2021); Stellantis North America (2022–2023, 2026–present))
- Also called: Jeep Liberty (2002–2012)
- Model years: 1974–2012; 2014–2023; 2026–present

Body and chassis
- Class: Full-size SUV (1974–1983); Compact SUV (1984–2013); Compact crossover SUV (2014–2023, 2026–present)
- Layout: Front-engine, rear-wheel-drive (1974–2013); Front-engine, front-wheel-drive (2014–2023); Front-engine, four-wheel-drive (1974–2023, 2026–present)
- Chassis: Body-on-frame (1974–1983); Unibody (1984–2023, 2026–present)

The Jeep Cherokee is a line of sport utility vehicles (SUV) manufactured and marketed by Jeep over six generations. Marketed initially as a variant of the Jeep Wagoneer (SJ), the Cherokee has evolved from a full-size station wagon (before the SUV description came into use) to one of the first compact SUVs and into its latest generation as a crossover SUV.

Named after the Cherokee tribe of Native Americans in the United States, Jeep has used the nameplate in some capacity since late 1973 when American Motors Corporation (AMC) introduced the 1974 model year line.

Production of the Cherokee ended in February 2023, and restarted in August 2025.

== First generation (SJ; 1974) ==
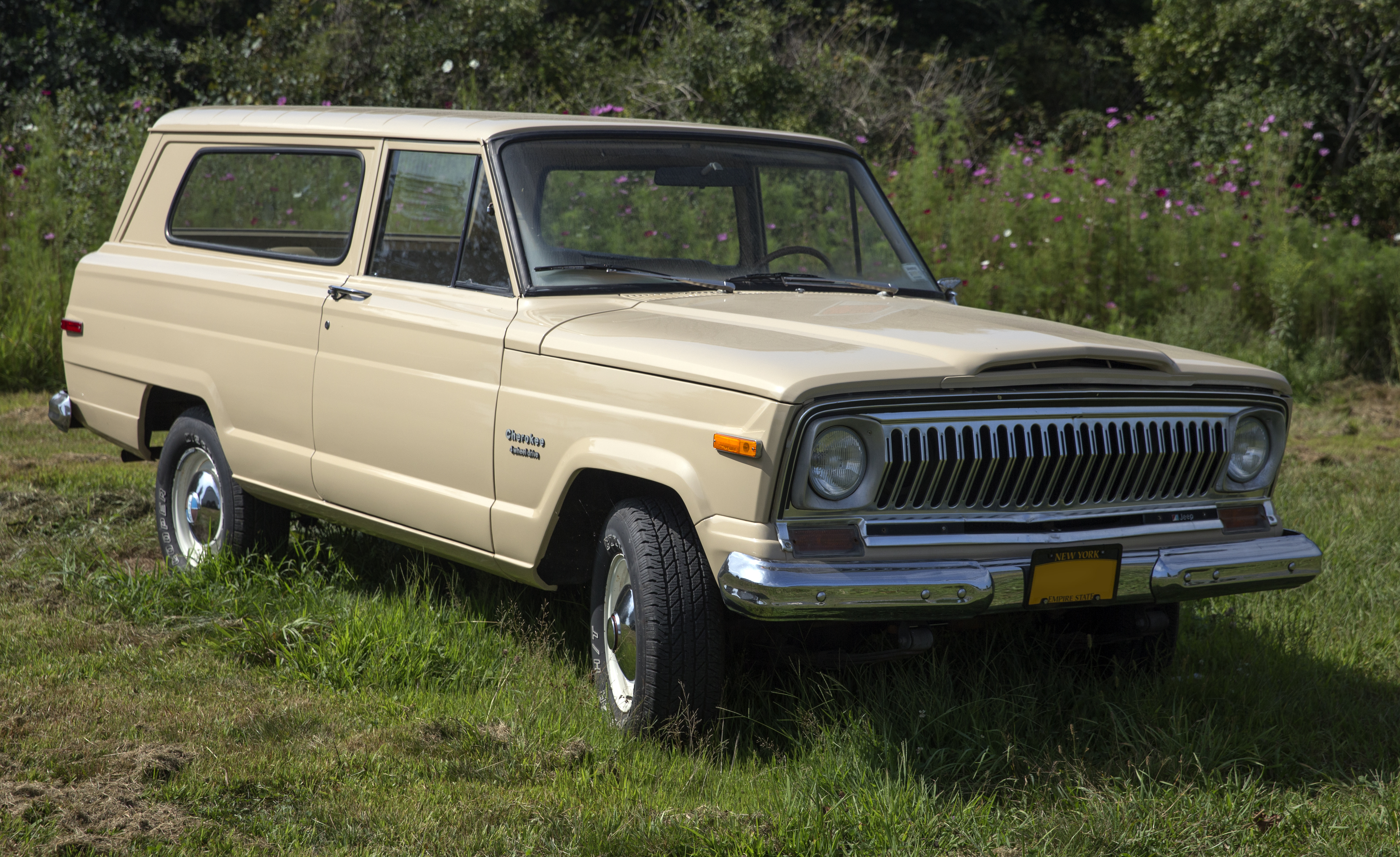
1975 Jeep Cherokee (US)

The first generation Cherokee was a rebadged reintroduction of a two-door body style Jeep Wagoneer. It featured a redesigned greenhouse that eliminated the car's C-pillar. Instead, the Cherokee had a much broader D-pillar and a single, long fixed rear side window with an optional flip-out section. A two-door version was previously available in the Jeep Wagoneer line (from 1963 through 1967). However, this design had the same pillar and window configuration as the four-door Wagoneer.

The Cherokee replaced the Jeepster Commando, whose sales had not met expectations despite extensive upgrades for the 1972 and 1973 model years. The Cherokee was positioned to appeal to a younger market segment than the Wagoneer, which was regarded more as a family SUV.

The Cherokee was revealed in late 1973, and it was marketed as the "sporty" two-door variant of Jeep's station wagon that went beyond the CJ-5 in interior space with off-road ability.

The term "sport(s) utility vehicle" appears for the first time in the 1974 Cherokee sales brochure. This was the "birth" of the SUV, a "slogan for a vehicle that offered go-almost-anywhere capability along with the practicality of an estate" (station wagon).

A four-door was added to the lineup for the 1977 model year. In addition to the base model, the trim levels of the Cherokee included the S (Sport), Chief, Golden Eagle, Golden Hawk, Limited, Classic, Sport, Pioneer, and Laredo.

== Second generation (XJ; 1984) ==
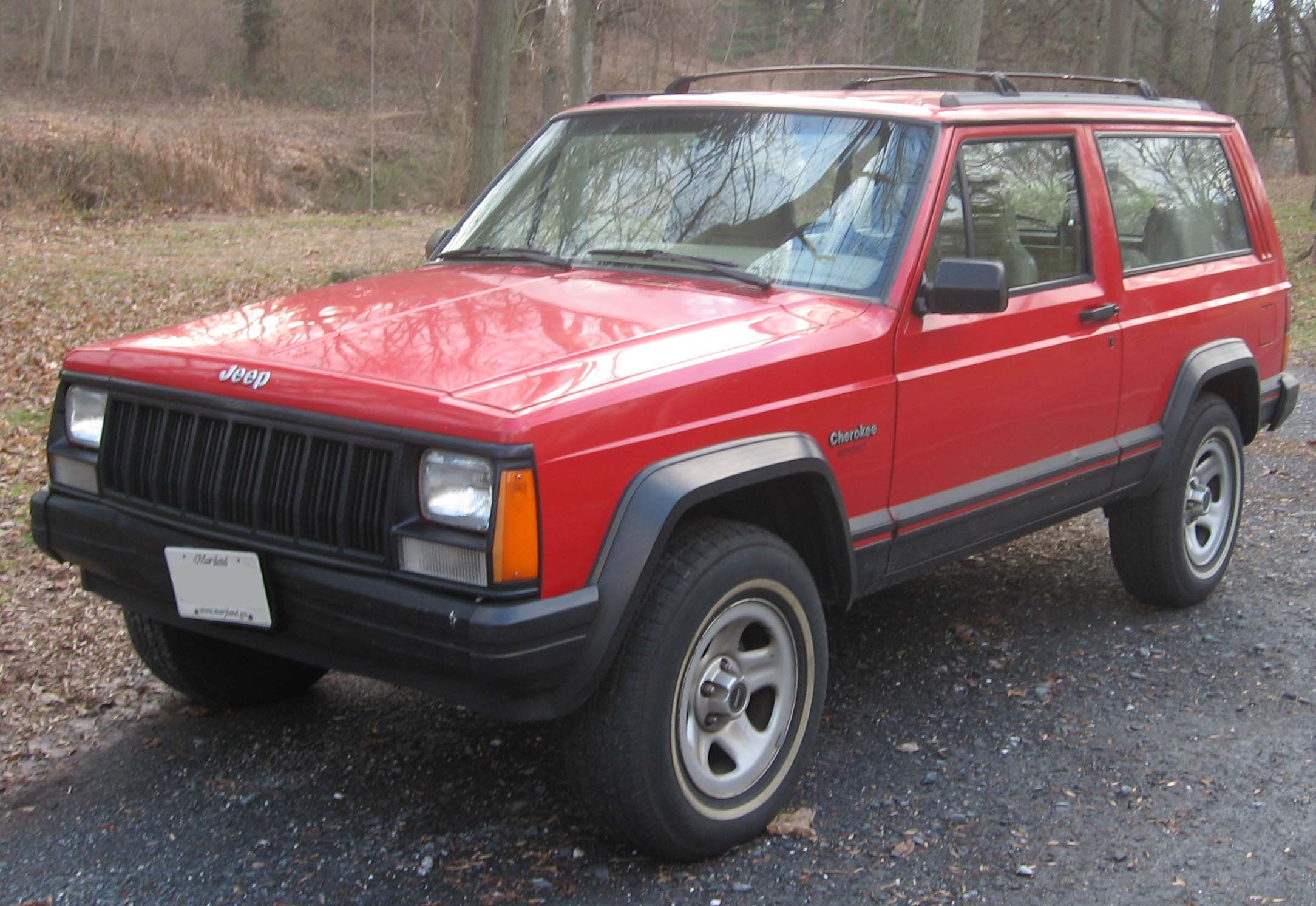
1984–2001 Jeep Cherokee 2-door

While the full-sized Wagoneer continued production for another eight years as the Grand Wagoneer, the Cherokee nameplate was moved to a new platform starting with the 1984 model year and continuing through 2001. Without a traditional body-on-frame chassis, the Cherokee instead featured a lightweight unibody design.

This generation of Cherokee would eventually be well known as the innovator of the modern SUV, as it spawned competitors, and other automakers noticed that this Jeep design began replacing regular cars. It also began to supplant the role of the station wagon and "transformed from truck to limousine in the eyes of countless suburban owners." The XJ is a "significant link in the evolution of the 4x4."

It would prove so popular that the second generation Cherokee's replacement was released as a separate vehicle, the Jeep Grand Cherokee, starting a successive line of Jeep flagship models.

== Third generation (KJ; 2002) ==
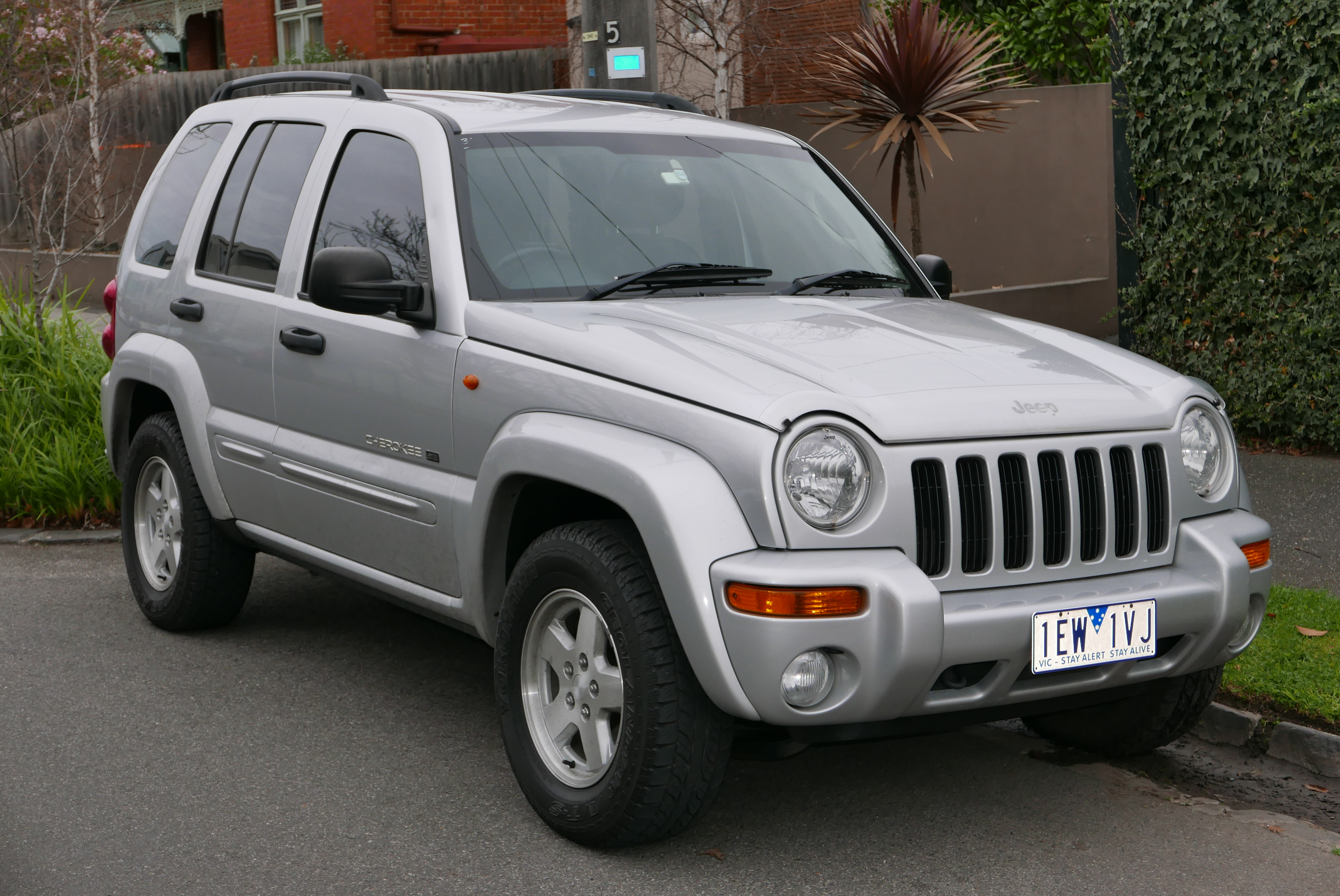
2003 Jeep Cherokee Limited Edition wagon (Australia)

The third generation, marketed as the Jeep Liberty in North America to differentiate it from the Grand Cherokee, was introduced in April 2001 for the 2002 model year. It was sold as the Jeep Cherokee in markets outside of North America.

The Cherokee was priced between the Wrangler and Grand Cherokee. It remained the smallest of the four-door Jeep SUVs until the crossover-based four-door Compass and Patriot were introduced for the 2007 model year. The Cherokee featured unibody construction. It was assembled at the Toledo North Assembly Plant in the United States and other countries, including Egypt and Venezuela.

The KJ was the first Jeep vehicle to use rack and pinion steering. It was also the first Jeep to feature the newly introduced "PowerTech" engines; the 150 hp (112 kW; 152 PS) 2.4 L I4, which was used until 2006, and the 210 hp (157 kW; 213 PS) 3.7 L V6. The KJ Cherokee was also the second Jeep vehicle to incorporate an independent front suspension, with the 1963 Wagoneer first to feature this as an option on four-wheel-drive.

== Fourth generation (KK; 2008) ==
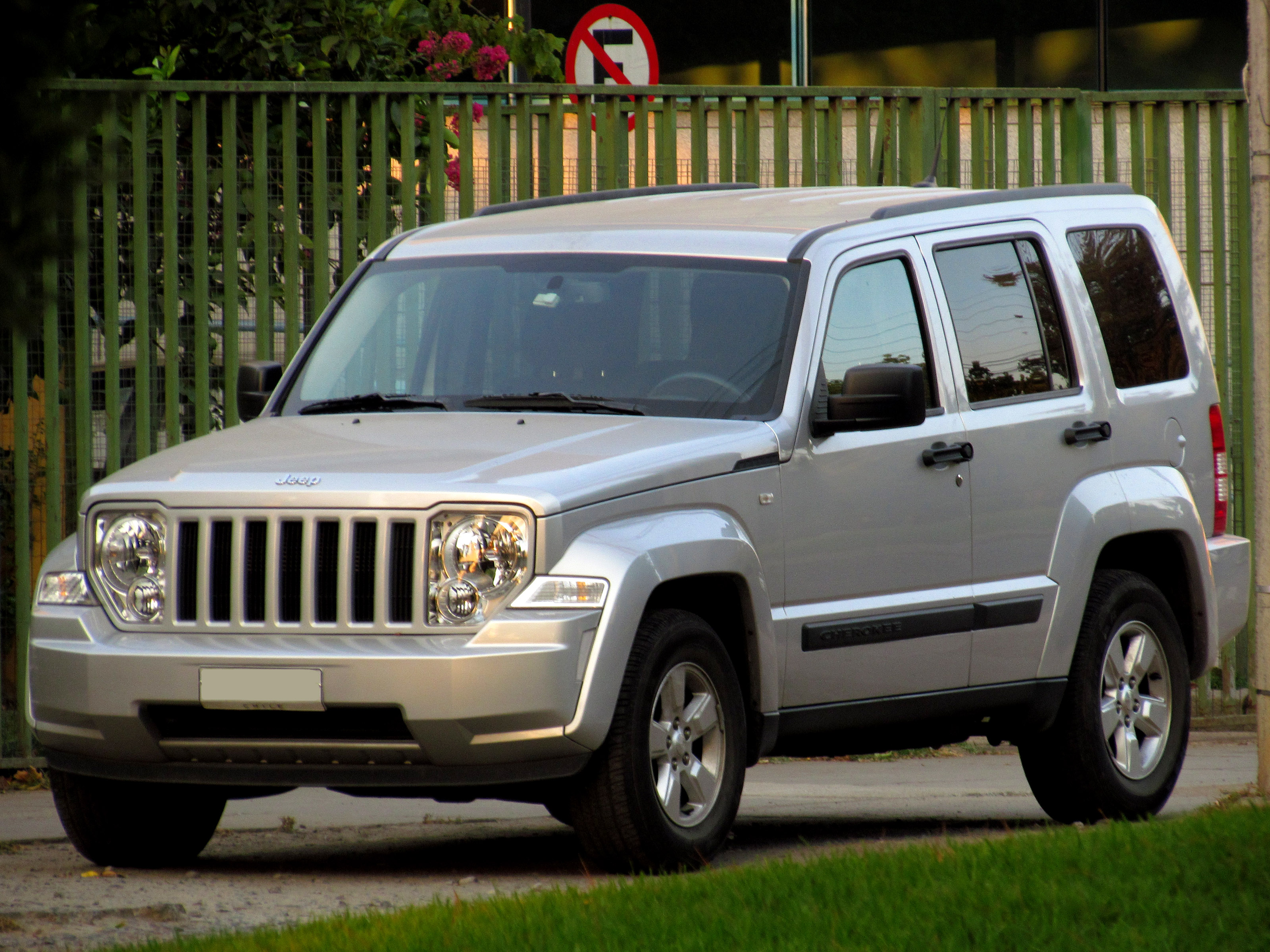
Jeep Cherokee (Chile)

Continuing to be marketed as the Jeep Liberty in North America, the Cherokee was redesigned in 2008. For the first time, a rebadged fourth-generation Cherokee was marketed by Dodge as the Nitro. The Nitro was discontinued after 2011, and Sergio Marchionne wanted to avoid duplicate vehicles with Dodge and Jeep (as well as Chrysler) sharing the same sales network.

The four-cylinder engine was dropped from the Cherokee's models because the smaller Patriot and Compass offered greater fuel efficiency. The iron-block, aluminum-head V6 became the standard engine with the 2008 models. The towing capacity was 5,000 pounds (2,268 kg). Jeep discontinued the Cherokee's CRD for the American market because it could not meet the more rigid 2007 emissions standards for diesel engines. Transmission choices were both carry-overs: a six-speed manual or a four-speed automatic. Standard equipment included electronic stability control with roll mitigation, traction control, and anti-lock brakes with brake assist. New Features included standard side airbags. Optional features were rain-sensing wipers, Sirius Satellite Radio, Bluetooth, a navigation system, and the MyGig entertainment system with a 30GB hard drive.

== Fifth generation (KL; 2014) ==
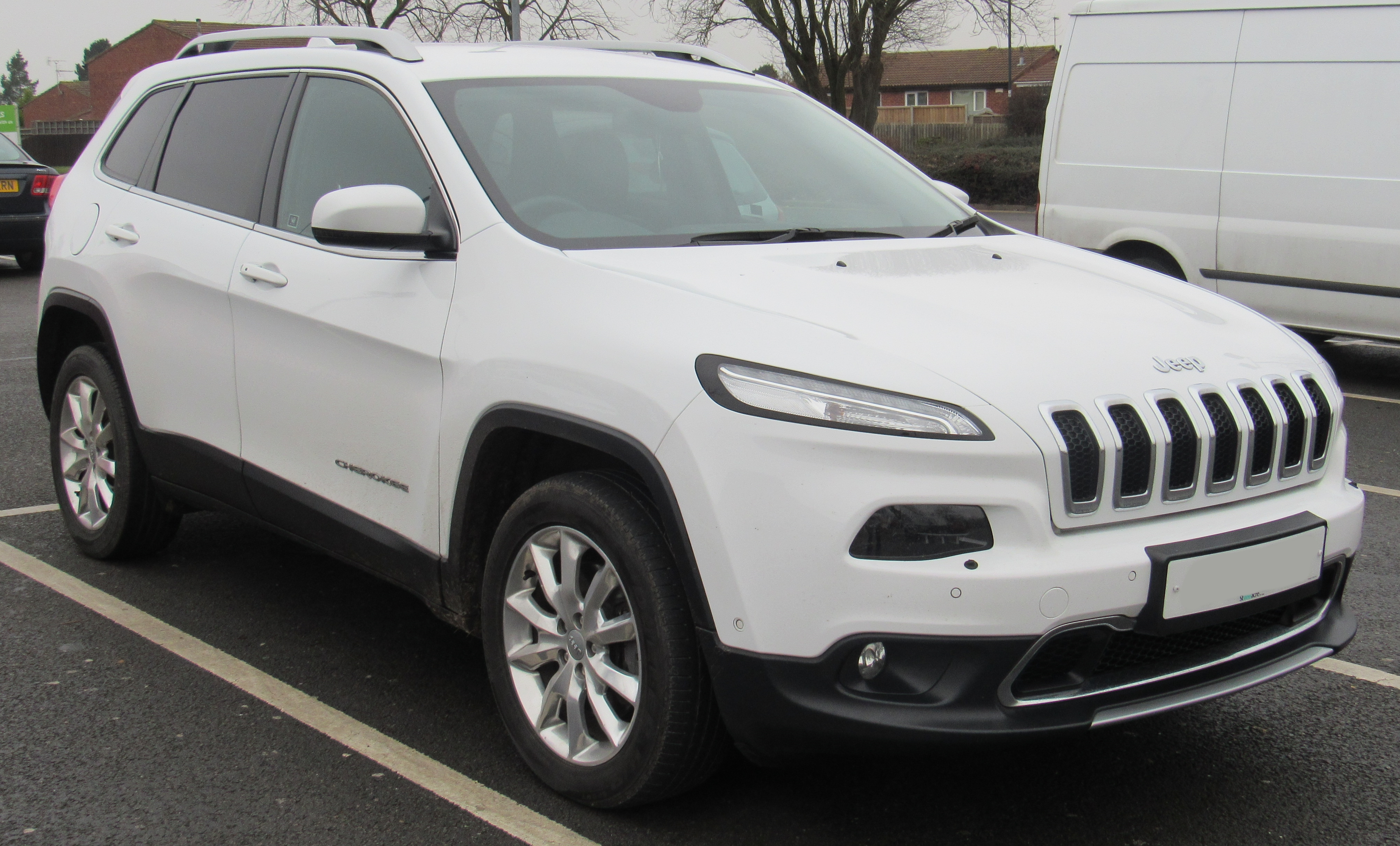
Jeep Cherokee Limited Multijet (United Kingdom)

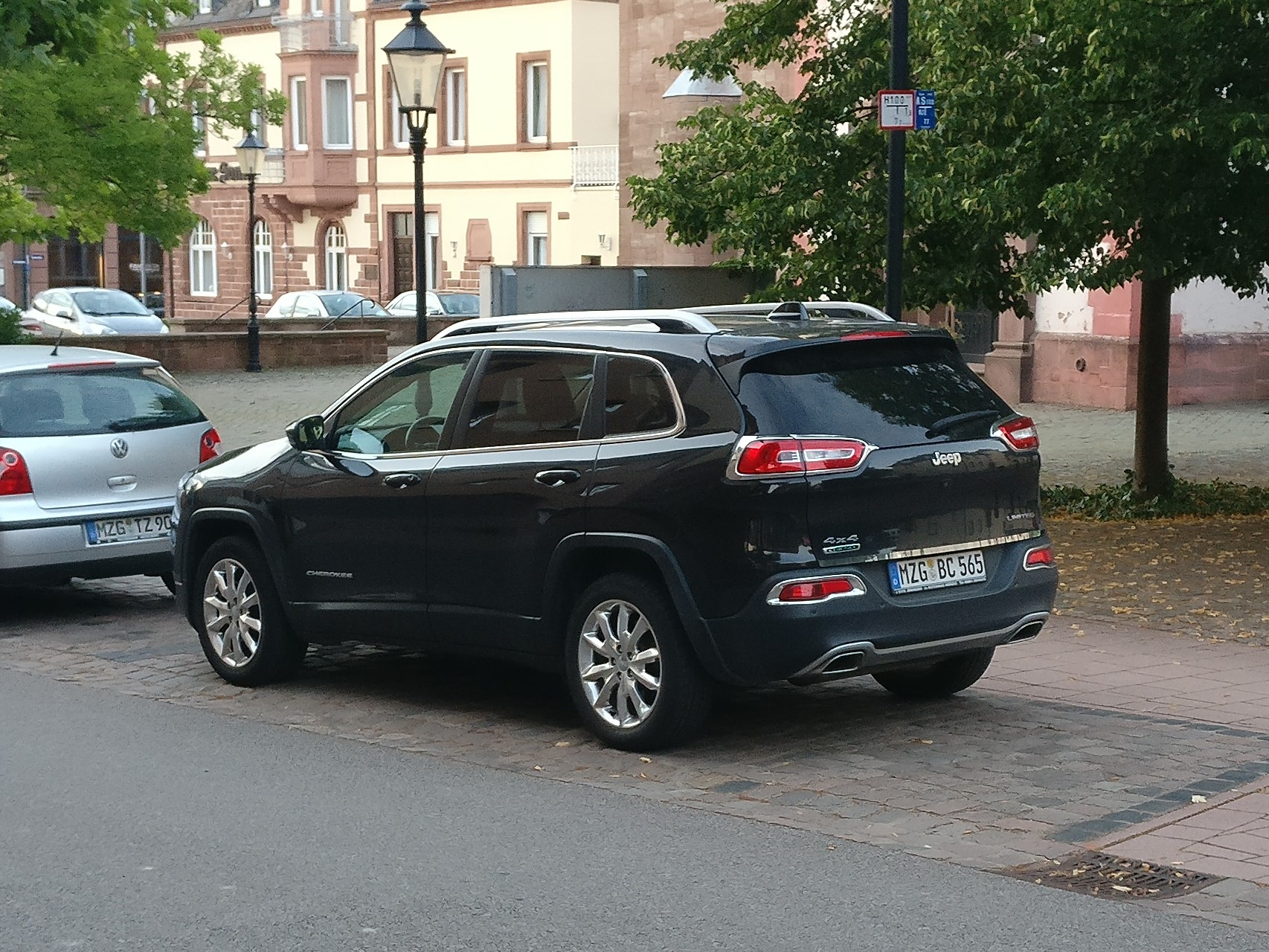
5th Gen Jeep Cherokee in Mettlach, Germany

For the fifth generation, the Cherokee nameplate returned to North America as the vehicle was converted to a crossover and grew to midsize to make room for the Jeep Renegade below the Cherokee and Compass. It was introduced for the 2014 model year at the 2013 New York International Auto Show, with sales starting in November 2013. The Cherokee is the first Jeep vehicle to be built on the Fiat Compact/Compact U.S. Wide platform, co-developed by Chrysler and Fiat.

The Cherokee has a highway fuel economy rating of 31 miles per U.S. gallon (7.6 L/100 km; 37 mpg_{‑imp}) and a 45% better fuel economy rating than the Liberty/Cherokee it replaced.

The Cherokee was facelifted for the 2018 model year, and a new 2.0 L turbo engine became available, rated with 270 hp (201 kW; 274 PS) and 295 pound force-feet (400 N⋅m) of torque. The other engines included the 3.2 L V6 and 2.4 L inline-four.

For the 2021 model year, Jeep added more standard comfort and convenience features on each trim, as well as introduced the Latitude Lux and related 80th Anniversary trims.

The Jeep Cherokee assembly was at the Belvidere Assembly Plant in Belvidere, Illinois, until 28 February 2023.

== Sixth generation (KM; 2026) ==
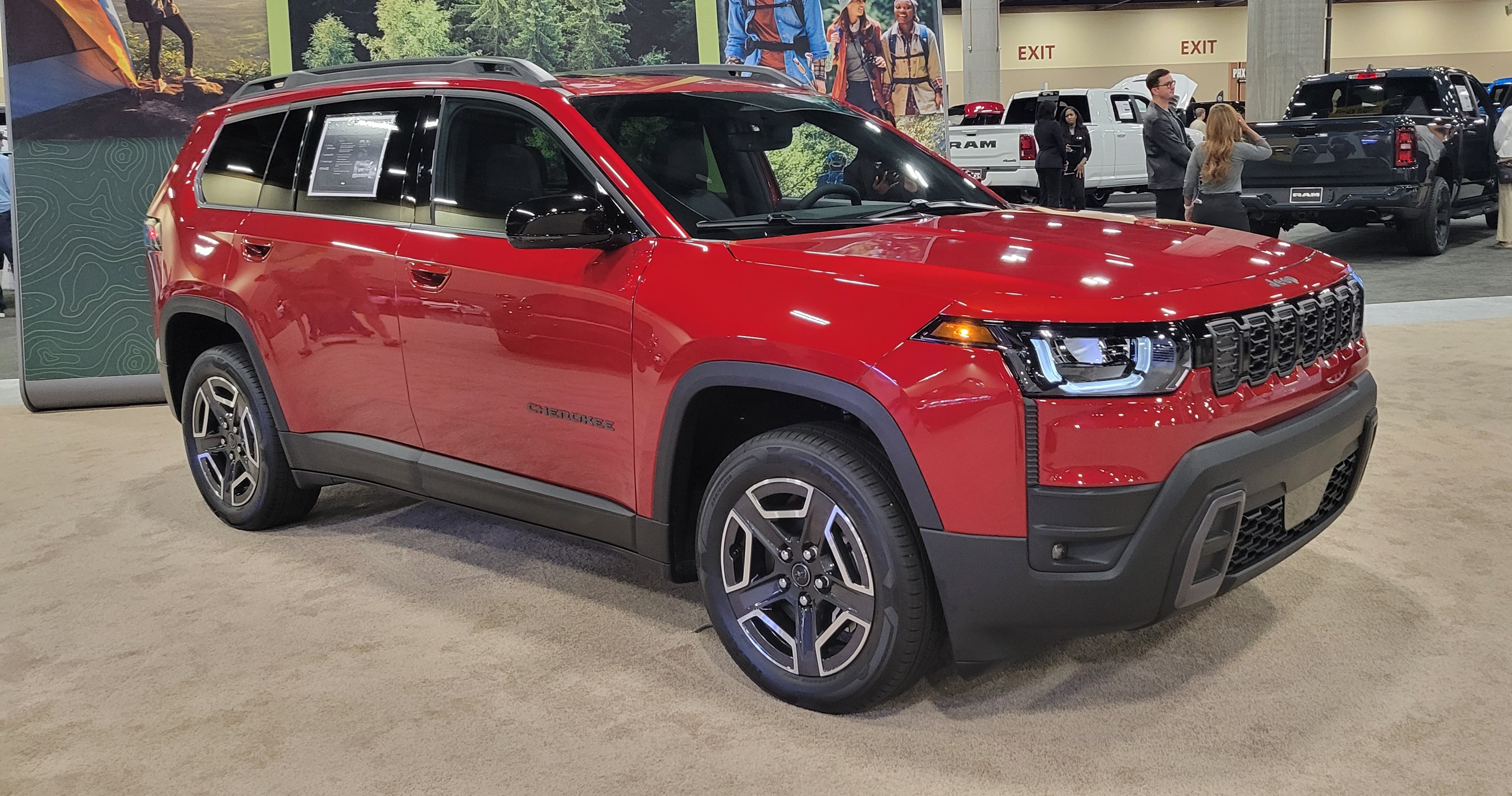
2026 Jeep Cherokee Limited

Jeep revived the Cherokee for a sixth generation (KM) in August 2025. It is based on the STLA Large Transverse platform. It was launched with a 1.6-liter Stellantis Prince engine EP6CDTX turbocharged four-cylinder hybrid drivetrain only, with the potential for a gasoline ICE-only model later, possibly the 2.0 L Hurricane 4 EVO Turbo-I4 in late 2026 for the 2027 model year. Production started in August 2025 at Toluca Car Assembly for the 2026 model year, although on October 14, 2025, Stellantis CEO Antonio Filosa announced that as part of the company's $13 billion US investment, production of the Cherokee (KM) would be moved to the long idled Belvidere Assembly Plant in Belvidere, Illinois for the 2027 model year from Toluca. In May 2026 this plan was cancelled and the Cherokee will permanently be produced in Toluca. As Belvidere will now serve as the hub for vehicles riding on the company’s new architecture the STLA One platform.

== Call to change the name ==
In February 2021, Chuck Hoskin, Jr., principal chief of the Cherokee Nation, called for Jeep to change the vehicle's name. "I think we're in a day and age in this country where it's time for both corporations and team sports to retire the use of Native American names, images and mascots from their products, team jerseys and sports in general." The Cherokee Nation had previously made no official request to stop using the name since its introduction in 1973. There is no copyright on the Cherokee name, and the tribe was not offered royalties for its use. A Stellantis spokesperson said that vehicle names "have been carefully chosen and nurtured over the years to honor and celebrate Native American people for their nobility, prowess, and pride."

By March 2021, Carlos Tavares stated that Stellantis was open to dropping the Cherokee name from its vehicles, and "the company was in talks with the Cherokee Nation over the use of tribe's name on its SUVs." Following the discussions, Jeep will continue the Cherokee name on some versions of the vehicles.
