= Chrysler =

American subsidiary of automaker Stellantis

FCA US, LLC

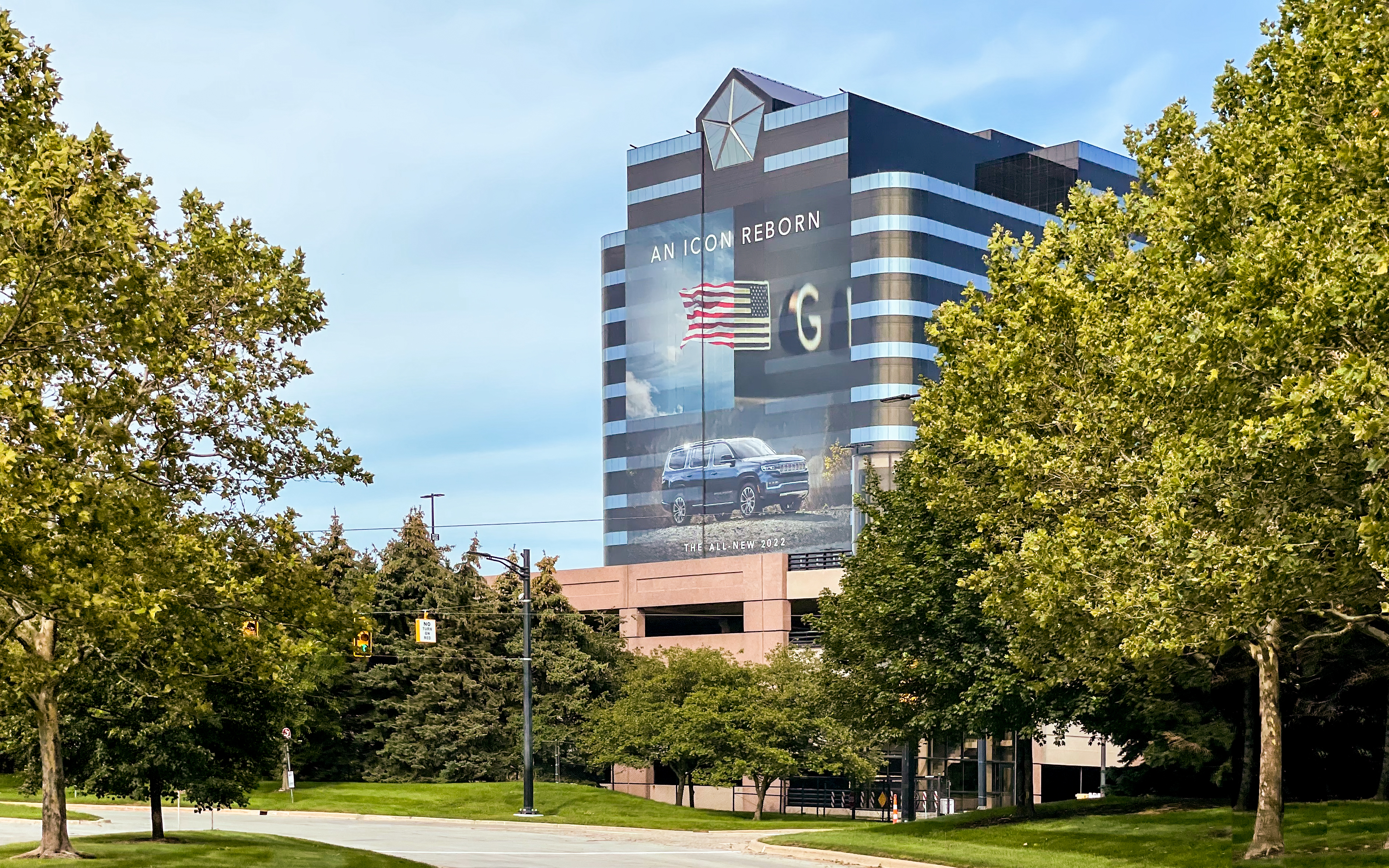
- The Chrysler World Headquarters and Technology Center in Auburn Hills, Michigan, headquarters of Stellantis North America
- Trade name: Stellantis North America
- Formerly: Chrysler Corporation (1925‍–‍1999); DaimlerChrysler Corporation (1999‍–‍2007); Chrysler LLC (2007‍–‍2009); Chrysler Group LLC (2009–2014); Fiat Chrysler Automobiles US (2014‍–‍2021)
- Type: Subsidiary
- Traded as: NYSE: C (until 1998)
- Industry: Automotive
- Predecessor: United States Motor Company (1910–1913); Maxwell-Chalmers (1913–1925)
- Founded: June 6, 1925; 101 years ago
- Founder: Walter Chrysler
- Headquarters: 1000 Chrysler Drive, Auburn Hills, Michigan, United States
- Number of locations: See List of Stellantis North America factories
- Area served: North America
- Key people: Antonio Filosa (CEO)
- Brands: Chrysler; Dodge; Jeep; Ram Trucks; Mopar; SRT
- Number of employees: 81,341 (2023)
- Parent: Stellantis
- Subsidiaries: Stellantis Canada

FCA US, LLC, doing business as Stellantis North America and known historically as the Chrysler Corporation (/ˈkraɪslər/ KRY-slər), is one of the "Big Three" automobile manufacturers in the United States, headquartered in Auburn Hills, Michigan. It is the American subsidiary of the multinational automotive company Stellantis. Stellantis North America sells vehicles worldwide under the Chrysler, Dodge, Jeep, and Ram Trucks nameplates. It also includes Mopar, its automotive parts and accessories division, and SRT, its performance automobile division. The division also distributes Alfa Romeo, Fiat, and Maserati vehicles in North America.

The original Chrysler Corporation was founded in 1925 by Walter Chrysler from the remains of the Maxwell Motor Company. In 1998, it merged with Daimler-Benz, which renamed itself DaimlerChrysler but in 2007 sold off its Chrysler stake. The company operated as Chrysler LLC through 2009, then as Chrysler Group LLC. In 2014, it was acquired by Fiat S.p.A.; it subsequently operated as a subsidiary of the new Fiat Chrysler Automobiles (FCA), then as a subsidiary of Stellantis, the company formed from the 2021 merger of FCA and PSA Group (Peugeot Société Anonyme).

After founding the company, Walter Chrysler used General Motors (GM)'s brand diversification and hierarchy strategy that he knew of when he worked at its Buick division. He then acquired Fargo Trucks and the Dodge Brothers Company, and created the Plymouth and DeSoto brands in 1928. Facing postwar declines in market share, productivity, and profitability, as GM and Ford were growing, Chrysler borrowed $250 million in 1954 from Prudential Insurance to pay for expansion and updated car designs.

Chrysler expanded into Europe by taking control of French, British, and Spanish auto companies in the 1960s; but in 1978 Chrysler Europe was sold to PSA Peugeot Citroën for a nominal $1. The company struggled to adapt to changing markets, increased U.S. import competition, and safety and environmental regulation in the 1970s. It began an engineering partnership with Mitsubishi Motors, and began selling Mitsubishi vehicles branded as Dodge and Plymouth in North America. On the verge of bankruptcy in the late 1970s, it was saved by $1.5 billion in loan guarantees from the U.S. government. New CEO Lee Iacocca was credited with returning the company to profitability in the 1980s. In 1985, Diamond-Star Motors was created, further expanding the Chrysler-Mitsubishi relationship. In 1987, Chrysler acquired American Motors Corporation (AMC), which brought the profitable Jeep, as well as the newly formed Eagle, brands under the Chrysler umbrella. In 1998, Chrysler merged with German automaker Daimler-Benz to form DaimlerChrysler AG; the merger proved contentious with investors. As a result, Chrysler was sold to Cerberus Capital Management and renamed Chrysler LLC in 2007.

Like the other Big Three automobile manufacturers, Chrysler was affected by the automotive industry crisis of 2008–2010. The company remained in business through a combination of negotiations with creditors, filing for Chapter 11 bankruptcy reorganization on April 30, 2009, and participating in a bailout from the U.S. government through the Troubled Asset Relief Program. On June 10, 2009, Chrysler emerged from the bankruptcy proceedings with the United Auto Workers pension fund, Fiat S.p.A., and the U.S. and Canadian governments as principal owners. The bankruptcy resulted in Chrysler defaulting on over $4 billion in debts. In May 2011, Chrysler finished repaying its obligations to the U.S. government five years early, although the cost to the American taxpayer was $1.3 billion.

Over the next few years, Fiat S.p.A. gradually acquired the other parties' shares. In January 2014, Fiat acquired the rest of Chrysler from the United Auto Workers retiree health trust, making Chrysler Group a subsidiary of Fiat S.p.A. In May 2014, Fiat Chrysler Automobiles was established by merging Fiat S.p.A. into the company. Chrysler Group LLC remained a subsidiary until December 15, 2014, when it was renamed FCA US LLC, to reflect the Fiat-Chrysler merger.

As a result of the merger between FCA and PSA, on 17 January 2021 it became a subsidiary of the Stellantis Group.

== History ==
=== 1925–1998: Chrysler Corporation ===
The Chrysler company was founded by Walter Chrysler on June 6, 1925, when the Maxwell Motor Company (est. 1904) was re-organized into the Chrysler Corporation. The company was headquartered in the Detroit enclave of Highland Park, where it remained until completing the move to its present Auburn Hills location in 1996.

Chrysler had arrived at the ailing Maxwell-Chalmers company in the early 1920s, hired to overhaul the company's troubled operations (after a similar rescue job at the Willys-Overland car company). In late 1923, production of the Chalmers automobile was ended.

In January 1924, Walter Chrysler launched the well-received Chrysler automobile. The Chrysler Six was designed to provide customers with an advanced, well-engineered car, at an affordable price. Elements of this car are traceable to a prototype which had been under development at Willys during Chrysler's tenure The original 1924 Chrysler included a carburetor air filter, high compression engine, full pressure lubrication, and an oil filter, features absent from most autos at the time. Among the innovations in its early years were the first practical mass-produced four-wheel hydraulic brakes, a system nearly completely engineered by Chrysler with patents assigned to Lockheed, and rubber engine mounts, called "Floating Power" to reduce vibration. Chrysler also developed a wheel with a ridged rim, designed to keep a deflated tire from flying off the wheel. This wheel was eventually adopted by the auto industry worldwide.

The Maxwell brand was dropped after the 1925 model year, with the new, lower-priced four-cylinder Chryslers introduced for the 1926 year being badge-engineered Maxwells. The advanced engineering and testing that went into Chrysler Corporation cars helped to push the company to the second-place position in U.S. sales by 1936, which it held until 1949.

In 1928, the Chrysler Corporation began dividing its vehicle offerings by price class and function. The Plymouth brand was introduced at the low-priced end of the market (created essentially by once again reworking and rebadging the Chrysler Series 50 four-cylinder model). At the same time, the DeSoto brand was introduced in the medium-price field. Also in 1928, Chrysler bought the Dodge Brothers automobile and truck company and continued the successful Dodge line of automobiles and Fargo range of trucks. By the mid-1930s, the DeSoto and Dodge divisions would trade places in the corporate hierarchy.

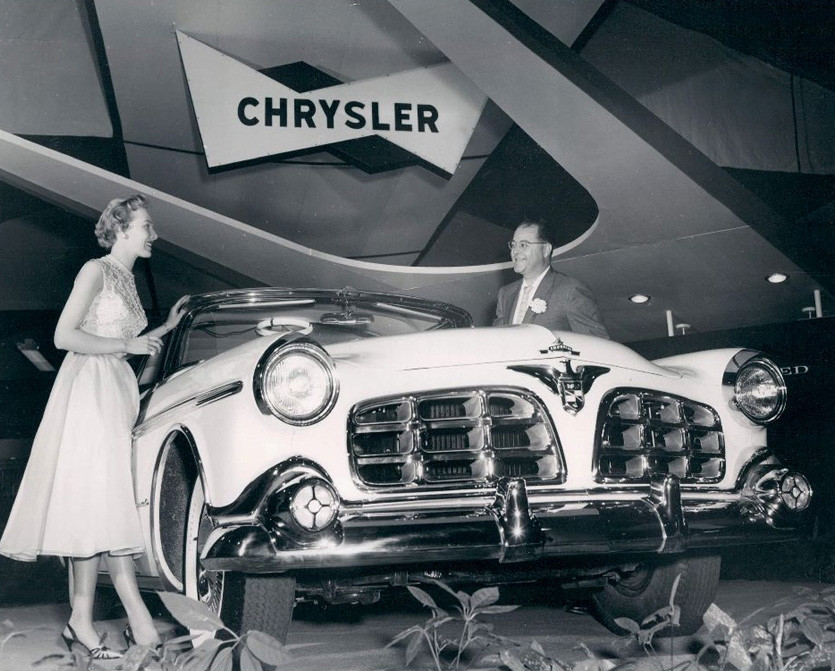
1955 Imperial car model, in its first year as a separate make, apart from Chrysler, shown on display at January 1955 Chicago Auto Show

The Imperial name had been used since 1926 but was never a separate make, just the top-of-the-line Chrysler. However, in 1955, the company decided to offer it as its own make/brand and division to better compete with its rivals, Lincoln and Cadillac. This addition changed the company's traditional four-make lineup to five (in order of price from bottom to top): Plymouth, Dodge, DeSoto, Chrysler, and the now-separate Imperial.

1955 Chrysler – Philco all-transistor car radio – "Breaking News" radio broadcast announcement

On April 28, 1955, Chrysler and Philco announced the development and production of the World's First All-Transistor car radio. The all-transistor car radio, Mopar model 914HR, developed and produced by Chrysler and Philco, was a $150 option on the 1956 Imperial automobile models. Philco began manufacturing this radio in the fall of 1955 at its Sandusky Ohio plant.

On September 28, 1957, Chrysler announced the first production electronic fuel injection (EFI), as an option on some of its new 1958 car models (Chrysler 300D, Dodge D500, DeSoto Adventurer, Plymouth Fury). The first attempt to use this system was by American Motors on the 1957 Rambler Rebel. Bendix Corporation's Electrojector used a transistor "computer brain" modulator box, but teething problems on pre-production cars meant very few cars were made. The EFI system in the Rambler ran fine in warm weather, but suffered hard starting in cooler temperatures and AMC decided not to use this EFI system on its 1957 Rambler Rebel production cars that were sold to the public. Chrysler also used the Bendix "Electrojector" fuel injection system and only around 35 vehicles were built with this option, on its 1958 production-built car models. Owners of EFI Chryslers were so dissatisfied that all but one were retrofitted with carburetors (while that one has been completely restored, with original EFI electronic problems resolved).

The Valiant was also introduced for the 1960 model year as a distinct brand. In the U.S. market, Valiant was made a model in the Plymouth line for 1961 and the DeSoto make was discontinued in 1961. With those exceptions per applicable year and market, Chrysler's range from lowest to highest price from the 1940s through the 1970s was Valiant, Plymouth, Dodge, DeSoto, Chrysler, and Imperial.

In 1954, Chrysler was the exclusive provider of its Hemi V8 engine in the Facel Vega, a French coachbuilder that offered its own line of hand-built luxury performance cars, coupled with the PowerFlite and TorqueFlite automatic transmissions. The Facel Vega Excellence was a four-door hardtop with rear-hinged coach doors that listed for US$12,800 ($142,837 in 2025 dollars). In 1960 Facel Vega introduced the smaller Facellia sports car to capitalize on its sales success with Chrysler supplied engines. At the time, Chrysler didn't produce a four-cylinder engine, and the company had to find alternatives before production began.

In 1960, Chrysler became the first of the "Big Three" automakers to switch to unibody construction for its passenger cars, with the exception of Imperial, which continued to be produced on the body-on-frame platform prevalent in the US until 1967, when the unibody construction had proven itself to be reliable enough that Chrysler was willing to also apply it to its flagship.

From 1963 through 1969, Chrysler increased its existing stakes to take complete control of the French Simca, British Rootes, and Spanish Barreiros companies, merging them into Chrysler Europe in 1967. In the 1970s, an engineering partnership was established with Mitsubishi Motors, and Chrysler began selling Mitsubishi vehicles branded as Dodge and Plymouth in North America.

Chrysler struggled to adapt to the changing environment of the 1970s. When consumer tastes shifted to smaller cars in the early 1970s, particularly after the 1973 oil crisis, Chrysler could not meet the demand, although its compact models on the "A" body platform, the Dodge Dart and Plymouth Valiant, had proven economy and reliability and sold very well. Additional burdens came from increased US import competition, and tougher government regulation of car safety, fuel economy, and emissions. As the smallest of the Big 3 US automakers, Chrysler lacked the financial resources to meet all of these challenges. 1975 would be the last year for Imperial, except for an ill-fated attempt at revival in 1981-1983, for its low sales no longer justified it as a separate brand when it didn't offer much over a high-end Chrysler New Yorker. In 1976, with the demise of the reliable Dart/Valiant, quality control declined. Their replacements, the Dodge Aspen and Plymouth Volare, were comfortable and had good roadability, but owners soon experienced major reliability problems which crept into other models as well. Engines failed and/or did not run well, and premature rust plagued bodies. In 1978, Lee Iacocca was brought in to turn the company around, and in 1979 Iacocca sought US government help. Congress later passed the Loan Guarantee Act providing $1.5 billion in loan guarantees. The Loan Guarantee Act required that Chrysler also obtain $2 billion in concessions or aid from sources outside the federal government, which included interest rate reductions for $650 million of the savings, asset sales of $300 million, local and state tax concessions of $250 million, and wage reductions of about $590 million along with a $50 million stock offering. $180 million was to come from concessions from dealers and suppliers. Also in 1978, Iacocca offloaded the ailing European operation to PSA Peugeot Citroën for a nominal $1, taking with it the group's substantial losses and debts which had been dragging the rest of the business down.

After a period of plant closures and salary cuts agreed to by both management and the auto unions, the Plymouth Reliant and Dodge Aries compact was introduced in 1981 on the all-new Chrysler K platform, which was developed from the Plymouth Horizon and Dodge Omni hatchbacks, which were introduced in 1978. Chrysler returned to profitability in 1980, repaying the loans with interest in 1983. The Omni/Horizon were first offered with four-cylinder engines provided by Chrysler Europe brand Simca, then Volkswagen, until the all-new Chrysler engineered Chrysler K engine arrived. Chrysler had not manufactured a four-cylinder engine since 1933 when the Chrysler flathead four-cylinder was canceled. In November 1983, the Dodge Caravan/Plymouth Voyager was introduced, built on a modified K platform, establishing the minivan as a major category, and initiating Chrysler's return to stability.

In 1985, Diamond-Star Motors was created, further expanding the Chrysler-Mitsubishi relationship.

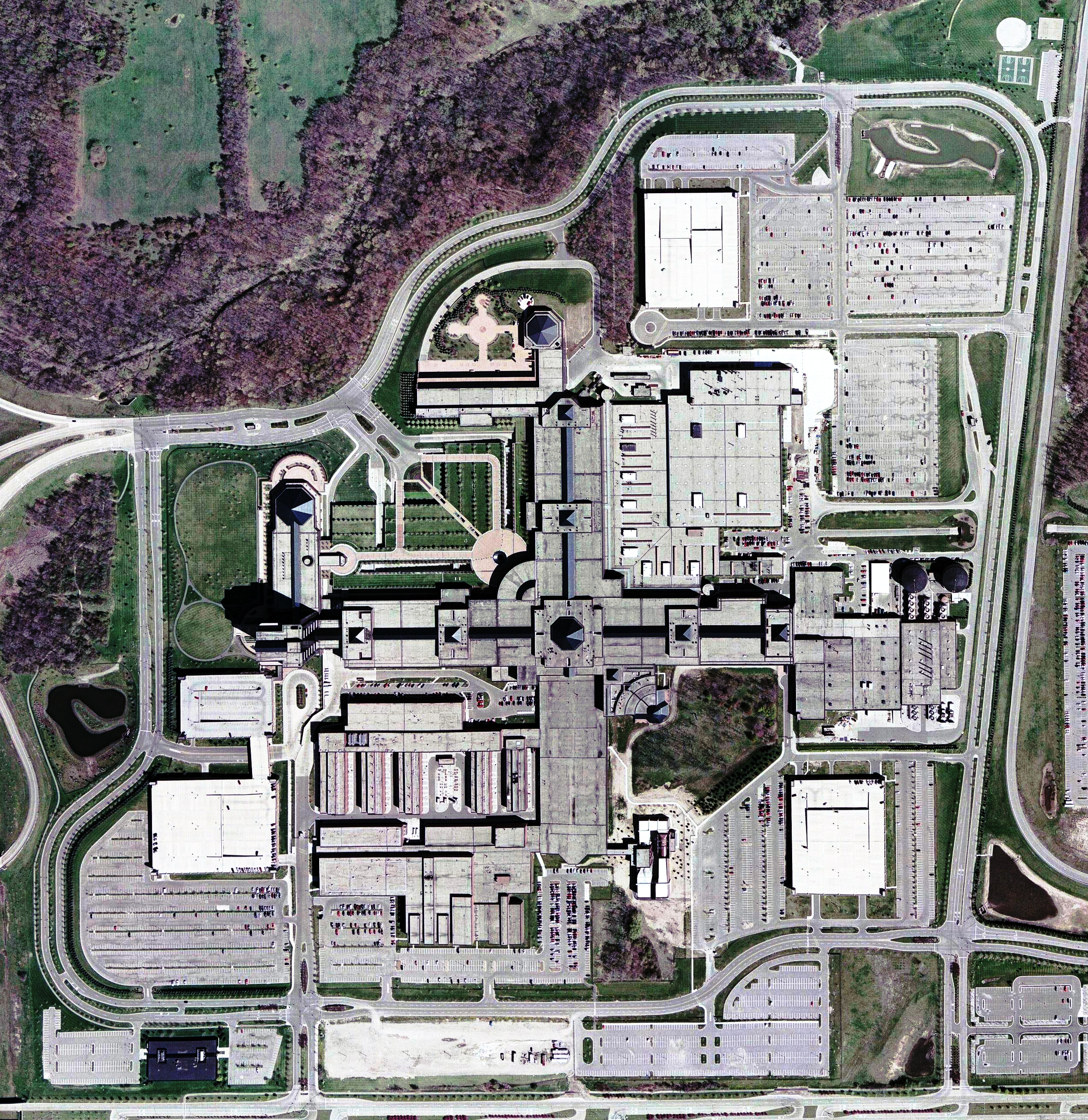
Aerial view of the Chrysler World Headquarters and Technology Center in Auburn Hills, Michigan, completed in 1996. Photo was taken in 2002.

In 1985, Chrysler entered an agreement with American Motors Corporation to produce Chrysler M platform rear-drive, as well as Dodge Omnis front wheel drive cars, in AMC's Kenosha, Wisconsin, plant. In 1987, Chrysler acquired the 47% ownership of AMC that was held by Renault. The remaining outstanding shares of AMC were bought on the NYSE by August 5, 1987, making the deal valued somewhere between US$1.7 billion and US$2 billion, depending on how costs were counted. Chrysler CEO Lee Iacocca wanted the Jeep brand, particularly the Jeep Grand Cherokee (ZJ) that was under development, the new world-class manufacturing plant in Bramalea, Ontario, and AMC's engineering and management talent that became critical for Chrysler's future success. Chrysler established the Jeep/Eagle division as a "specialty" arm to market products distinctly different from the K-car-based products with the Eagle cars targeting import buyers. Former AMC dealers sold Jeep vehicles and various new Eagle models, as well as Chrysler products, strengthening the automaker's retail distribution system.

Eurostar, a joint venture between Chrysler and Steyr-Daimler-Puch, began producing the Chrysler Voyager in Austria for European markets in 1992.

=== 1998–2007: DaimlerChrysler ===
In 1998, Chrysler and its subsidiaries entered into a partnership dubbed a "merger of equals" with German-based Daimler-Benz AG, creating the combined entity DaimlerChrysler AG. To the surprise of many stockholders, Daimler acquired Chrysler in a stock swap before Chrysler CEO Bob Eaton retired. Under DaimlerChrysler, the company was named DaimlerChrysler Motors Company LLC, with its U.S. operations generally called "DCX". The Eagle brand was retired soon after Chrysler's merger with Daimler-Benz in 1998 Jeep became a stand-alone division, and efforts were made to merge the Chrysler and Jeep brands as one sales unit. In 2001, the Plymouth brand was also discontinued.

Eurostar also built the Chrysler PT Cruiser in 2001 and 2002. The Austrian venture was sold to Magna International in 2002 and became Magna Steyr. The Voyager continued in production until 2007, whereas the Chrysler 300C, Jeep Grand Cherokee, and Jeep Commander were also built at the plant from 2005 until 2010.

On May 14, 2007, DaimlerChrysler announced the sale of 80.1% of Chrysler Group to American private equity firm Cerberus Capital Management, L.P., thereafter known as Chrysler LLC, although Daimler (renamed as Daimler AG) continued to hold a 19.9% stake.

=== 2007–2014: Effects of Great Recession ===
The economic collapse during the 2008 financial crisis pushed the company to the brink. On April 30, 2009, the automaker filed for Chapter 11 bankruptcy protection to be able to operate as a going concern, while renegotiating its debt structure and other obligations, which resulted in the corporation defaulting on over $4 billion in secured debts. The U.S. government described the company's action as a "prepackaged surgical bankruptcy".

On June 10, 2009, substantially all of Chrysler's assets were sold to "New Chrysler", organized as Chrysler Group LLC. The federal government provided support for the deal with US$8 billion in financing at nearly 21%. Under CEO Sergio Marchionne, "World Class Manufacturing" or WCM, a system of thorough manufacturing quality, was introduced and several products were re-launched with quality and luxury. The Ram, Jeep, Dodge, SRT, and Chrysler divisions were separated to focus on their own identity and brand, and 11 major model refreshes occurred in 21 months. The PT Cruiser, Nitro, Liberty and Caliber models (created during DCX) were discontinued. On May 24, 2011, Chrysler repaid its $7.6 billion loans to the United States and Canadian governments. The US Treasury, through the Troubled Asset Relief Program (TARP), invested $12.5 billion in Chrysler and recovered $11.2 billion when the company shares were sold in May 2011, resulting in a $1.3 billion loss. On July 21, 2011, Fiat bought the Chrysler shares held by the US Treasury. The purchase made Chrysler foreign-owned again, this time as the luxury division. The Chrysler 300 was badged Lancia Thema in some European markets (with additional engine options), giving Lancia a much-needed replacement for its flagship.

=== 2014–2021: Fiat Chrysler Automobiles ===
On January 21, 2014, Fiat bought the remaining shares of Chrysler owned by the VEBA worth $3.65 billion. Several days later, the intended reorganization of Fiat and Chrysler under a new holding company, Fiat Chrysler Automobiles (FCA), together with a new logo were announced. The most challenging launch for this new company came immediately in January 2014 with a completely redesigned Chrysler 200. The vehicle's creation is from the completely integrated company, FCA, executing from a global compact-wide platform.

On December 16, 2014, Chrysler Group LLC announced a name change to FCA US LLC.

On January 12, 2017, FCA shares traded at the New York Stock Exchange lost value after the EPA accused FCA US of using emissions cheating software to evade diesel-emissions tests, however the company countered the accusations, and the chairman and CEO Sergio Marchionne sternly rejected them. The following day, shares rose as investors played down the effect of the accusations. Analysts gave estimates of potential fines from several hundred million dollars to $4 billion, although the likelihood of a hefty fine was low. Senior United States Senator Bill Nelson urged the FTC to look into possible deceptive marketing of the company's diesel-powered SUVs. Shares dropped 2.2% after the announcement. FCA US would in 2022, plead guilty to a criminal charge of conspiring to defraud the US, to wire fraud, and to violate the Clean Air Act.

On July 21, 2018, Sergio Marchionne stepped down as chairman and CEO for health reasons, and was replaced by John Elkann and Michael Manley, respectively.

As a result of ending domestic production of more fuel-efficient passenger automobiles such as the Dodge Dart and Chrysler 200 sedans, FCA US elected to pay $77 million in fines for violating the anti-backsliding provision of fuel economy standards set under the Energy Independence and Security Act of 2007 for its model year 2016 fleet. It was again fined for the 2017 model year for not meeting the minimum domestic passenger car standard. FCA described the $79 million civil penalty as "not expected to have a material impact on its business."

As part of a January 2019 settlement, FCA was to recall and repair approximately 100,000 automobiles equipped with a 3.0-liter V6 EcoDiesel engine having a prohibited defeat device, pay $311 million in total civil penalties to US regulators and CARB, pay $72.5 million for state civil penalties, implement corporate governance reforms, and pay $33.5 million to mitigate excess pollution. The company was also to pay affected consumers up to $280 million and offer extended warranties on such vehicles worth $105 million. The total value of the settlement was about $800 million, though FCA did not admit liability, and it did not resolve an ongoing criminal investigation.

=== 2021–present: Stellantis ===
On December 21, 2020, the European Commission approved the merger between FCA and PSA Group with minimal conditions. Shareholders approved the deal on January 4, 2021, and the merger was finalized on January 16, 2021, with FCA US now part of a new entity: Stellantis.

Stellantis shares began trading under the symbol “STLA” on the Milan Stock Exchange and Euronext Paris on January 18, and on the New York Stock Exchange on 19 January. For accounting purposes, PSA was designated the acquirer, and financial statements reflect PSA's historical performance.

Under Carlos Tavares' leadership, Stellantis faced growing criticism over its cost-cutting strategy, declining sales, and strained relations with key stakeholders. Tavares implemented aggressive restructuring measures, including job cuts and strict control over product development, which some analysts blamed for delays in launching new models and weakening brand performance, particularly at Stellantis North America. U.S. dealers expressed concern about rising inventories and brand mismanagement, while the United Auto Workers criticized the company over job cuts and halted investment plans. In 2024, Stellantis reported a 70% drop in net profit, with global shipments and U.S. market share declining significantly. Amid internal friction with the board and worsening financial performance, Tavares resigned in December 2024, two years before his contract was set to expire.

On May 28, 2025, the board of Stellantis unanimously appointed Antonio Filosa, a longtime executive who had led Stellantis operations in North and South America, as CEO starting June 23. Filosa is expected to place renewed emphasis on the North American market. However, the majority of its management team remains based in Europe. Following the appointment of Filosa, formerly COO of Stellantis North America, Stellantis announced on June 10, 2025, that he would be based in Auburn Hills, Michigan. His predecessor, Carlos Tavares, former CEO of PSA, was based in Europe and regularly worked remotely from his Portuguese property. He was considered by some to have insufficient presence in the United States.

On October 14, 2025, Stellantis announced an investment of $13 billion to strengthen its growth in the United States over the next four years. The company claims this is its largest investment in its century-long history in the United States. The Belvidere, Illinois, plant will reopen for production of two new Jeep Cherokee and Jeep Compass vehicles. The company also said it will create more than 5,000 manufacturing jobs in four Midwestern U.S. states.

On May 20, 2026, Stellantis and British luxury carmaker Jaguar Land Rover signed a memorandum of understanding to "explore synergies in areas such as product and technology development" within the United States.

=== Logo evolution ===
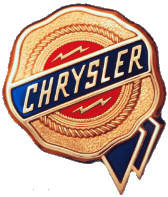
1925–1955

1955–1962

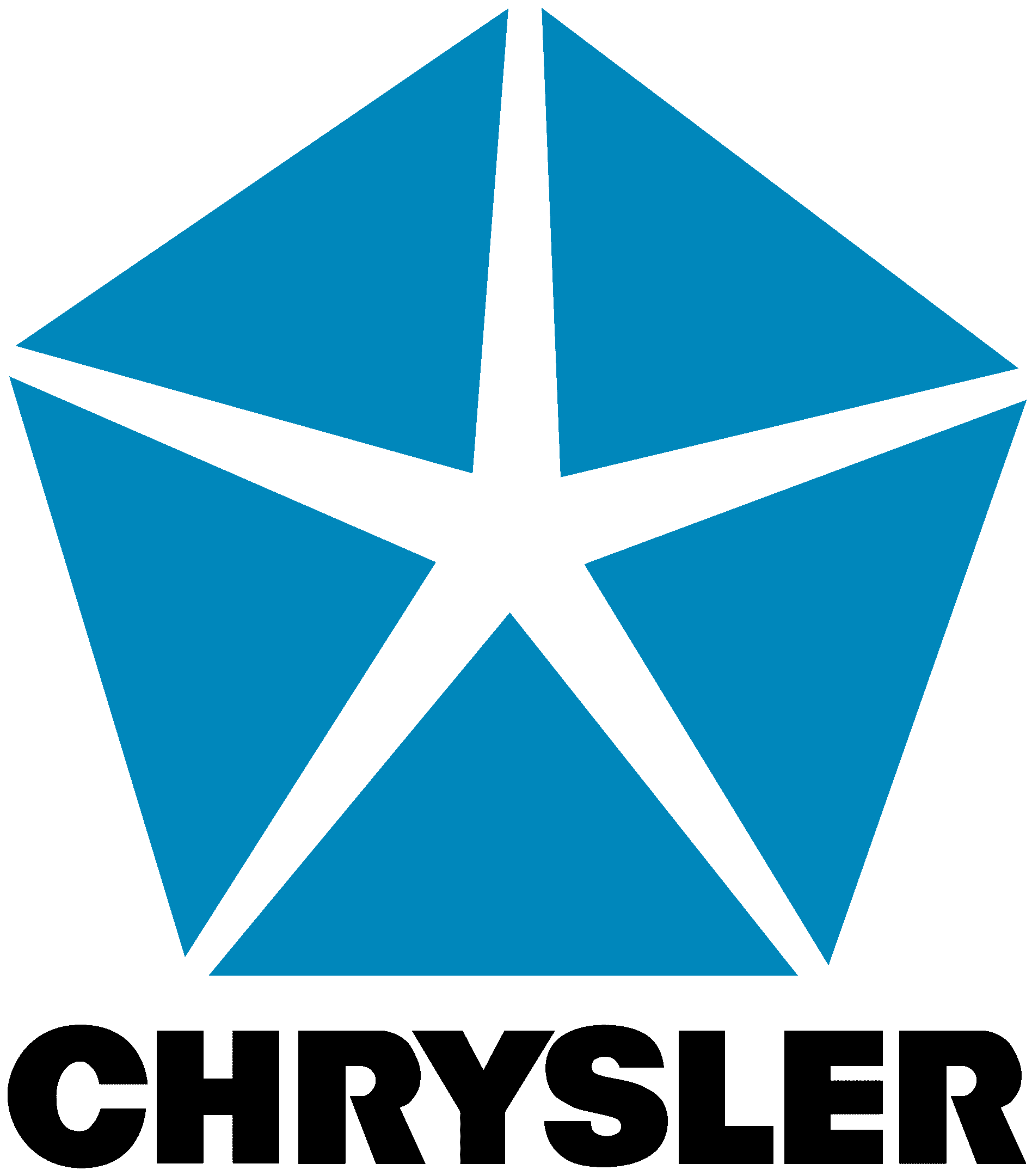
1962–1998

1998–2007 (Note: DaimlerChrysler logo)

2007–2014

2014–2021 (Note: Fiat Chrysler Automobiles logo)

2021–present (Note: Stellantis logo)

== Corporate governance ==
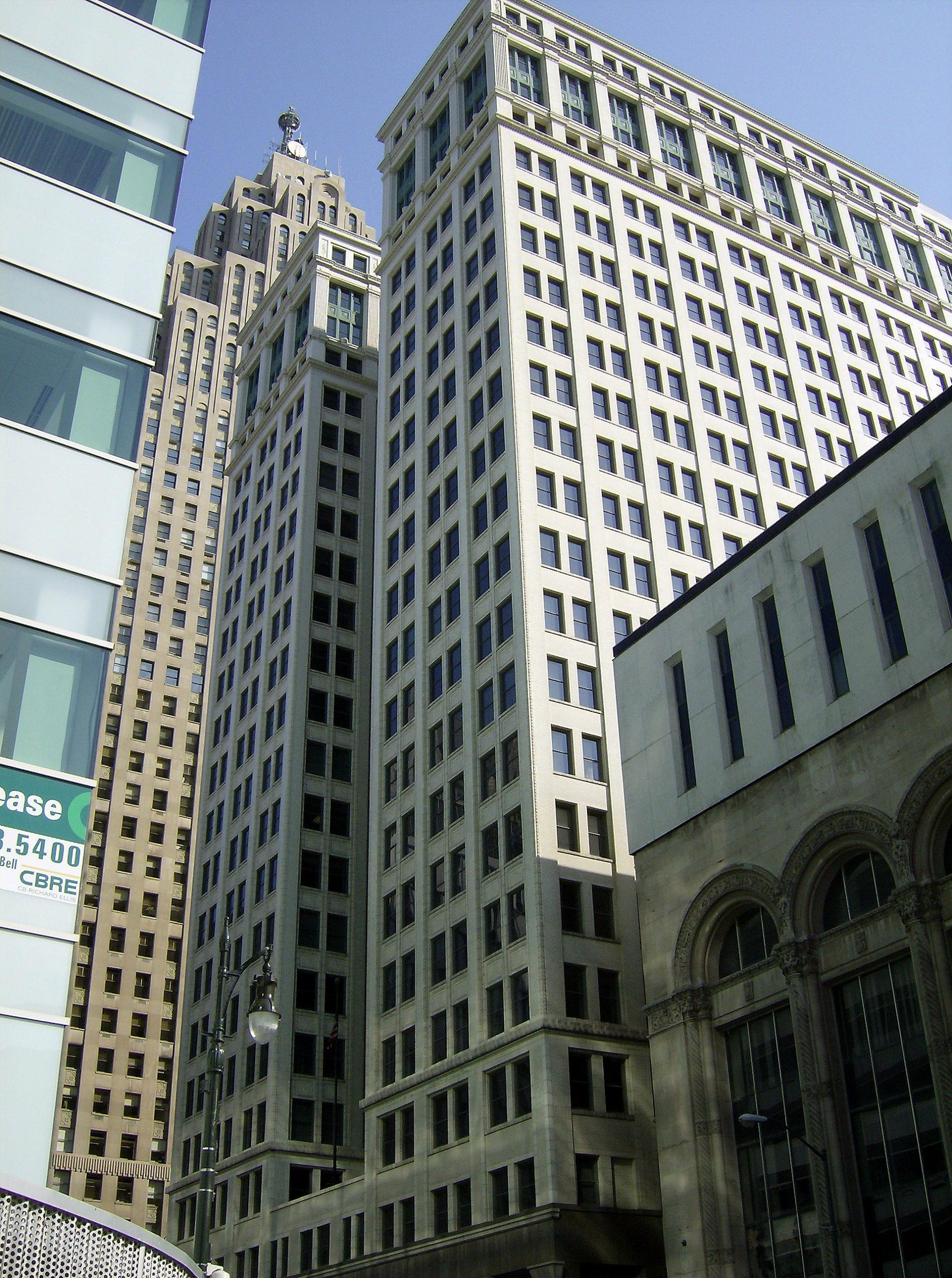
Chrysler House landmark executive offices in the Detroit Financial District

As of 2022, management positions of Stellantis North America include:

=== Board of directors ===
- Carlos Zarlenga, COO (since February 2024)
- Richard Palmer, CFO

=== Management team ===
- Jeffrey Kommor: head of US sales
- Lottie Holland: head of diversity, inclusion, and engagement, FCA - North America
- Bruno Cattori: president and CEO, FCA Mexico, S.A. de C.V.
- Mark Champine: head of quality, FCA - North America
- Mark Chernoby: chief technical compliance officer, Stellantis N.V.
- Martin Horneck: head of purchasing and supply chain management, FCA - North America
- Mamatha Chamarthi: chief information officer, FCA - North America and Asia Pacific
- Marissa Hunter: head of marketing
- Philip Langley: head of network development, FCA - North America
- Ralph Gilles: head of design
- Michael Resha: head of manufacturing, FCA - North America
- Roger "Shane" Karr: head of external affairs, FCA - North America
- Michael J. Keegan: chief audit; sustainability and compliance officer
- Timothy Kuniskis: brand chief executive officer, Ram Trucks
- Matt McAlear: brand chief executive officer, Chrysler and Dodge
- Bob Broderdorf: brand chief executive officer, Jeep
- Jim Morisson: head of Jeep brand, FCA - North America
- João Laranjo: chief financial officer, FCA - North America
- Michael Bly: head of global propulsion systems, Stellantis N.V.
- Jeffrey P. Lux: head of transmission powertrain, FCA - North America
- Chris Pardi: general counsel and corporate secretary, FCA - North America
- Barbara J. Pilarski: head of business development, FCA - North America
- Carlos Zarlenga: chief operating officer
- Scott Thiele: head of portfolio planning, FCA - North America; head of global long-range plan coordination
- Joseph Veltri: head of investor relations
- Rob Wichman: ad interim head of product development, FCA - North America
- Larry Dominique: senior vice president, Alfa Romeo - North America
- Christopher G. Fields: vice president, U.S. employee relations

== Sales and marketing ==
=== United States sales ===
Stellantis is the smallest of the "Big Three", which also includes Ford and GM. In 2020, it sold just over 1.8 million vehicles.

=== Global sales ===
Chrysler was the world's 11th largest vehicle manufacturer as ranked by OICA in 2012. Total Chrysler vehicle production was about 2.37 million that year. The company has since become a wholly owned subsidiary and no longer reports global sales.

=== Marketing ===
==== Lifetime powertrain warranty ====
In 2007, Chrysler began to offer vehicle lifetime powertrain warranty for the first registered owner or retail lessee. The deal covered owner or lessee in U.S., Puerto Rico, and the Virgin Islands, for 2009 model year vehicles, and 2006, 2007, and 2008 model year vehicles purchased on or after July 26, 2007. Covered vehicles excluded SRT models, Diesel vehicles, Sprinter models, Ram Chassis Cab, Hybrid System components (including transmission), and certain fleet vehicles. The warranty is non-transferable. After Chrysler's restructuring, the warranty program was replaced by five-year/100,000 mile transferable warranty for 2010 or later vehicles.

==== "Let's Refuel America" ====
In 2008, as a response to customer feedback citing the prospect of rising gas prices as a top concern, Chrysler launched the "Let's Refuel America" incentive campaign, which guaranteed new-car buyers a gasoline price of $2.99 for three years. With the U.S. purchase of eligible Chrysler, Jeep, and Dodge vehicles, customers could enroll in the program and receive a gas card that immediately lowers their gas price to $2.99 a gallon, and keeps it there for the three years.

==== Lancia co-branding ====
Chrysler plans for Lancia to codevelop products, with some vehicles being shared. Olivier Francois, Lancia's CEO, was appointed to the Chrysler division in October 2009. Francois plans to reestablish the Chrysler brand as an upscale brand.

==== Ram trucks ====
In October 2009, Dodge's car and truck lines were separated, with the name "Dodge" being used for cars, minivans, and crossovers and "Ram" for light- and medium-duty trucks and other commercial-use vehicles.

| Calendar year | U.S. Chrysler sales | %Chg/yr. |
|---|---|---|
| 1999 | 2,638,561 | |
| 2000 | 2,522,695 | ▼4.4% |
| 2001 | 2,273,208 | ▼9.9% |
| 2002 | 2,205,446 | ▼3% |
| 2003 | 2,127,451 | ▼3.5% |
| 2004 | 2,206,024 | ▲3.7% |
| 2005 | 2,304,833 | ▲4.5% |
| 2006 | 2,142,505 | ▼7% |
| 2007 | 2,076,650 | ▼3.1% |
| 2008 | 1,453,122 | ▼30% |
| 2009 | 931,402 | ▼36% |
| 2010 | 1,085,211 | ▲17% |
| 2011 | 1,369,114 | ▲26% |
| 2012 | 1,651,787 | ▲21% |
| 2013 | 1,800,368 | ▲9% |
| 2014 | 2,090,639 | ▲16% |
| 2015 | 2,243,907 | ▲7% |
| 2016 | 2,244,315 | ▲0.0% |
| 2017 | 2,059,376 | ▼0.8% |
| 2018 | 2,235,204 | ▲8.5% |
| 2019 | 2,203,663 | ▼1.4% |
| 2020 | 1,820,636 | ▼17.4% |
| 2021 | 1,777,394 | ▼2.4% |
| 2022 | 1,547,076 | ▼13.0% |
| 2023 | 1,527,090 | ▼1.3% |
| 2024 | 1,303,570 | ▼14.6% |

==== "Imported From Detroit" ====
In 2011, Chrysler unveiled its "Imported From Detroit" campaign with ads featuring Detroit rapper Eminem, one of which aired during the Super Bowl. The campaign highlighted the rejuvenation of the entire product lineup, which included the new, redesigned, and repackaged 2011 model year 200 sedans and 200 convertibles, the Chrysler 300 sedan, and the Chrysler Town & Country minivan. As part of the campaign, Chrysler sold a line of clothing items featuring the Monument to Joe Louis, with proceeds being funneled to Detroit-area charities, including the Boys and Girls Clubs of Southeast Michigan, Habitat for Humanity Detroit and the Marshall Mathers Foundation.

In March 2011, Chrysler Group LLC filed a lawsuit against Moda Group LLC (owner of Pure Detroit clothing retailer) for copying and selling merchandise with the "Imported from Detroit" slogan. Chrysler claimed it had notified defendant of its pending trademark application February 14, but the defendant argued Chrysler had not secured a trademark for the "Imported From Detroit" phrase. On June 18, 2011, U.S. District Judge Arthur Tarnow ruled that Chrysler's request did not show that it would suffer irreparable harm or that it had a strong likelihood of winning its case. Therefore, Pure Detroit's owner, Detroit retailer Moda Group LLC, can continue selling its "Imported from Detroit" products. Tarnow also noted that Chrysler does not have a trademark on "Imported from Detroit" and rejected the automaker's argument that trademark law is not applicable to the case. In March 2012, Chrysler Group LLC and Pure Detroit agreed to a March 27 mediation to try to settle the lawsuit over the clothing company's use of "Imported from Detroit" slogan. Pure Detroit stated that Chrysler has made false claims about the origins of three vehicles - Chrysler 200, Chrysler 300 and Chrysler Town & Country - none of which are built in Detroit. Pure Detroit also said that Chrysler's Imported From Detroit merchandise is not being made in Detroit. In 2012 Chrysler and Pure Detroit came to an undisclosed settlement.

Chrysler's Jefferson North Assembly, which makes the Jeep Grand Cherokee and Dodge Durango, is the only car manufacturing plant of any company remaining entirely in Detroit (General Motors operates a plant that is partly in Detroit and partly in Hamtramck).

In 2011, Eminem settled a lawsuit against Audi alleging the defendant had ripped off the Chrysler 300 Super Bowl commercial in the Audi A6 Avant ad.

==== "Halftime in America" ====
Again in 2012, Chrysler advertised during the Super Bowl. Its two-minute February 5, 2012 Super Bowl XLVI advertisement was titled "Halftime in America". The ad drew criticism from several leading U.S. conservatives, who suggested that its messaging implied that President Barack Obama deserved a second term and, as such, was political payback for Obama's support for the federal bailout of the company. Asked about the criticism in a 60 Minutes interview with Steve Kroft, Sergio Marchionne responded "just to rectify the record I paid back the loans at 19.7% Interest. I don't think I committed to do to a commercial on top of that" and characterized the Republican reaction as "unnecessary and out of place".

==== America's Import ====
In 2014, Chrysler started using a new slogan, "America's Import" in ads introducing its all-new 2015 Chrysler 200, targeting foreign automakers from Germany to Japan with such ads (German performance and Japanese quality), and at the ending of selected ads, the advertisement will say, "We Built This", indicating being built in America, instead of overseas.

==== Slogans ====
- Engineered to be Great Cars (1998–2001)
- Drive = Love (2002–2004)
- Inspiration comes standard (2004–2007)
- Engineered Beautifully (2007–mid 2010)
- Imported From Detroit (2011–2014)
- America's Import (2014–2016)

== Product line ==
=== Chrysler Uconnect ===
First introduced as MyGig, Chrysler Uconnect is a system that brings interactive ability to the in-car radio and telemetric-like controls to car settings. As of mid-2015, it was installed in hundreds of thousands of Fiat Chrysler vehicles. It connects to the Internet via the mobile network of AT&T, providing the car with its own IP address. Internet connectivity using any Chrysler, Dodge, Jeep or Ram vehicle, via a Wi-Fi "hot-spot", is also available via Uconnect Web. According to Chrysler LLC, the hotspot range extends approximately 100 feet (30 m) from the vehicle in all directions, and combines both Wi-Fi and Sprint's 3G cellular connectivity. Uconnect is available on several current and was available on several discontinued Chrysler models including the current Dodge Dart, Chrysler 300, Aspen, Sebring, Town and Country, Dodge Avenger, Caliber, Grand Caravan, Challenger, Charger, Journey, Nitro, and Ram.

In July 2015, IT security researchers announced a severe security flaw assumed to affect every Chrysler vehicle with Uconnect produced from late 2013 to early 2015. It allows hackers to gain access to the car over the Internet, and in the case of a Jeep Cherokee was demonstrated to enable an attacker to take control not just of the radio, A/C, and windshield wipers, but also of the car's steering, brakes and transmission. Chrysler published a patch that car owners can download and install via a USB stick, or have a car dealer install for them.

== Brands ==
Current and former brands of Stellantis North America:

=== Current ===
| Origin | Brand | Estab. | Added | Notes |
|---|---|---|---|---|
| US | Chrysler | 1925 | 1925 | |
| US | Dodge | 1900 | 1928 | |
| US | Jeep | 1943 | 1987 | |
| US | Mopar (Note: Replacement parts for Chrysler-built vehicles, as well as a brand for dealer service and customer service operations. It includes "Mopar Performance", a subdivision providing performance aftermarket parts for Chrysler-built vehicles.) | 1937 | 1937 | |
| US | Ram | 2010 | 2010 | Previously Ram was a series of Dodge trucks and vans. |

=== Former ===
| Origin | Brand | Estab. | Chrysler years | Fate |
|---|---|---|---|---|
| US | American Motors | 1954 | 1987–1988 | Defunct, succeeded by the Eagle brand |
| US | Chrysler Amplex (Note: Division that manufactured bearings and gears.) | 1932 | 1932–1988 | Sold to ICM Industries |
| US | Graham Brothers | 1916 | 1928–1929 | Discontinued, and trucks continued under Dodge and Fargo; passenger car division continued independently as Graham-Paige |
| US | Chrysler Marine (Note: Division that built inboard, outboard engines, and various types of boats.) | 1927 | 1927–1980 | Discontinued |
| US | DeSoto (Note: Desoto trucks were built and sold by Chrysler in Turkey until 1978, after which Askam took over the Turkish rights to the marque.) | 1928 | 1928–1961 | Models consolidated and replaced by Chrysler Newport. |
| US | Eagle (Note: Name derived from the AMC Eagle model after Chrysler took over American Motors in 1987.) | 1988 | 1988–1998 | Discontinued |
| US | Fargo | 1913 | 1913–1972 | Discontinued (Note: Replaced by Plymouth Trucks in the US in 1937 and folded into the Dodge Division after 1972 in Canada.) |
| US | Global Electric Motorcars | 1992 | 1998–2011 | Sold to Polaris Industries |
| US | Imperial | 1955 | 1955–1983 | Discontinued |
| US | Plymouth | 1928 | 1928–2001 | Discontinued, all unique/incoming models integrated into Chrysler Line up. |
| US | Valiant | 1959 | 1959–1976 | Discontinued (Note: The Valiant was introduced in 1960 as a separate Chrysler brand, then was incorporated into the Plymouth line in the US starting in 1961.) |
| ITA | Lamborghini | 1963 | 1987–1994 | Sold to Mycom / V'Power Corp. |
| SPA | Barreiros | 1954 | 1969–1978 | Discontinued, became part of Chrysler Europe |
| FRA | Simca | 1934 | 1967–1970 | Discontinued, became part of Chrysler Europe |
| FRA | Matra | 1964 | 1970–1979 | Joint venture; stake acquired by Peugeot |
| UK | Humber | 1887 | 1967–1976 | Discontinued, became part of Chrysler Europe |
| UK | Commer | 1905 | 1967–1979 | Discontinued, became part of Chrysler Europe |
| UK | Karrier | 1908 | 1967–1979 | Discontinued, became part of Chrysler Europe |
| UK | Hillman | 1907 | 1967–1976 | Discontinued, became part of Chrysler Europe |
| UK | Sunbeam | 1905 | 1967–1976 | Discontinued, became part of Chrysler Europe |
| UK | Singer | 1875 | 1967–1970 | Discontinued, became part of Chrysler Europe |

=== Brand predecessors ===
==== Maxwell-Chalmers ====
- Maxwell (1904–1926), US; new models renamed Chrysler and Plymouth
- Chalmers (1908–1923) US for luxury cars; merged with Maxwell in 1922

==== United States Motor Company ====
(1908–1913); reorganized and folded into Maxwell

- Brush (1907–1913)
- Dayton (1905–1913)
- Alden-Sampson (1910–1913)
- Columbia (1899–1910)
- Riker (1897–1907)
- Electric Vehicle Company (1899–1907)
- Argo
- Hackett
- Lorraine
- Detroit
- Thomas (1906–1908)
- Sampson (1903–1913)
- Stoddard
- Courier (1909–1913)
- Providence
- Gray Marine Motor Company

==== Chrysler Corporation ====
- Graham Brothers (1916–1929) US; acquired by The Dodge Brothers Company in 1925 with the passenger car division split to form Graham-Paige and folded into Dodge after Chrysler's ownership
- Fargo (1913–1935) US, (1920–1972) Canada for trucks and vans; replaced by Plymouth Trucks in the US in 1937 and folded into the Dodge Division after 1972 in Canada

==== Rootes Group ====
(1913–1971), UK; minority interest purchased by Chrysler in 1964, progressively taking controlling interest in 1967, renamed Chrysler Europe in 1971

- Sunbeam (1901–1976), UK
- Humber (1898–1976), UK
- Singer (1905–1970), UK
- Commer (1905–1979), UK
- Hillman (1907–1976), UK
- Karrier (1908–1977), UK
- Talbot (1903–1958; 1979–1994), UK
- Simca (1934–1977), France
- Barreiros (1959–1978), Spain

==== American Motors Corporation ====
(1954–1988), US; purchased by Chrysler and renamed Jeep-Eagle Division

- AMC (Brand), (1967–1987) US; rebranded Eagle
- Hudson (1909–1957), US
  - Aerocar (1905–1908) US; Brand discontinued and Reorganized into Hudson Motors
  - Essex (1918–1933), US; Folded into the main Hudson line
  - Terraplane (1932–1938), US
- Nash (1917–1957), US
  - Jeffery (1903–1917), US; line dissolved and renamed Nash in 1915
  - LaFayette (1919–1940) US; folded into Nash
  - Ajax (1925–1926), US
  - Mitchell (1903–1923), US; purchased and renamed Ajax
- Rambler (1900–1914; 1950–1969), US
- Metropolitan (1959–1962), US
- AM General US 1970–1983; the former contract division of AMC

==== Kaiser Motors Corporation ====
- Kaiser (1946–1955) US for entry level; renamed Willys-Kaiser Motors, then to Kaiser-Jeep Corporation, purchased by AMC in 1970
- Frazer (1946–1951) US for entry level luxury; discontinued models incorporated in Kaiser

==== Graham-Paige ====
(1927–1947), mid-priced cars; purchased by Henry Kaiser and reorganized into Kaiser-Frazer Motors

- Paige-Detroit (1908–1928)
  - Jewett (1922–1926)

==== Willys-Overland Motors ====
(1912–1963) US; acquired by Kaiser Motors, later Kaiser Jeep, then by AMC in 1970

- Willys (1908–1955) US; withdrawn from the US market in 1955, used as Jeep Wrangler trim
  - Overland (1903–1926) US; acquired by Willys Motors in 1912, used as Jeep Wrangler trim
  - Russell (1904–1916) Canada
  - Curtiss (1917–1920) US; sold to Clement M. Keys and merged with Wright Aeronautical
  - Stearns-Knight (1898–1929) US; purchased by Willys in 1925

== Environmental initiatives ==
In 1979, Chrysler, in cooperation with the United States Department of Energy, produced an experimental battery electric vehicle, the Chrysler ETV-1.

In 1992, Chrysler developed the Dodge EPIC concept minivan. In 1993, Chrysler sold a limited-production electric minivan called the TEVan; only 56 were produced, mostly for electric utilities. A second generation, the EPIC (unrelated to the concept), was released in 1997 and discontinued in 1999.

Chrysler once owned the Global Electric Motorcars company, building low-speed neighborhood electric vehicles, but sold GEM to Polaris Industries in 2011.

In September 2007, Chrysler established ENVI, an in-house organization focused on electric-drive vehicles and related technologies which was disbanded by late 2009. In August 2009, Chrysler took US$70 million in grants from the U.S. Department of Energy to develop a test fleet of 220 hybrid pickup trucks and minivans.

The first hybrid models, the Chrysler Aspen hybrid and the Dodge Durango hybrid, were discontinued a few months after production in 2008, sharing its GM-designed hybrid technology with GM, Daimler and BMW.

Chrysler was on the Advisory Council of the PHEV Research Center, and undertook a government sponsored demonstration project with Ram and minivan vehicles.

In 2012, FCA CEO Sergio Marchionne stated that Chrysler and Fiat planned to focus primarily on alternative fuels, such as compressed natural gas and diesel, instead of hybrid and electric drivetrains for its consumer products.

Fiat Chrysler bought a total of 8.2 million megagrams of U.S. greenhouse gas emission credits from competitors including Toyota, Honda, Tesla and Nissan for the 2010, 2011, 2013, and 2014 model years. It had the worst fleet average fuel economy among major manufacturers selling in the US from model years 2012–2023.

== Chrysler Defense ==
The dedicated tank building division of Chrysler, this division was founded as the Chrysler Tank division in 1940, originally with the intention of providing another production line for the M2 Medium Tank, so that the U.S. Army could more rapidly build up its inventory of the type. Its first plant was the Detroit Arsenal Tank Plant. When the M2A1 was unexpectedly declared obsolete in August of the same year, plans were altered (though not without considerable difficulty) to produce the M3 Grant instead, primarily for the British as part of the United States under the counter support for the United Kingdom against Nazi Germany (the U.S. not yet being formally in the war), with the balance of the revised order going to the U.S. Army as the Lee. After December 1941 and the United States' entry into the war against the Axis powers, the Tank division rapidly expanded, with new facilities such as the Tank Arsenal Proving Ground at (then) Utica, Michigan. It also quickly widened the range of products it was developing and producing, including the M4 Sherman tank and the Chrysler A57 multibank tank engine.

== Special programs ==
During World War II, essentially all of Chrysler's facilities were devoted to building military vehicles (the Jeep brand came later, after Chrysler acquired American Motors Corporation). They were also designing V12 and V16 hemi-engines producing 2,500 hp (1,864 kW; 2,535 PS) for airplanes, but they did not make it into production as jets were developed and were seen as the future for air travel. During the 1950s Cold War period, Chrysler made air raid sirens powered by its Hemi V-8 engines.

=== Radar antennas ===
When the Radiation Laboratory at MIT was established in 1941 to develop microwave radars, one of the first projects resulted in the SCR-584, the most widely recognized radar system of the war era. This system included a parabolic antenna six feet in diameter that was mechanically aimed in a helical pattern (round and round as well as up and down).

One of Chrysler's most significant contributions to the war effort was in radar technology. For the final production design of this antenna and its highly complex drive mechanism, the Army's Signal Corps Laboratories turned to Chrysler's Central Engineering Office. There, the parabola was changed from aluminum to steel, allowing production to form using standard automotive presses. To keep weight down, 6,000 equally spaced holes were drilled in the face (this had no effect on the radiation pattern). The drive mechanism was completely redesigned, using technology derived from Chrysler's research in automotive gears and differentials. The changes resulted in improved performance, reduced weight, and easier maintenance. A large portion of the Dodge plant was used in building 1,500 of the SCR-584 antennas as well as the vans used in the systems.

=== Aircraft ===
- Chrysler VZ-6

=== Missiles ===
In April 1950, the U.S. Army established the Ordnance Guided Missile Center (OGMC) at Redstone Arsenal, adjacent to Huntsville, Alabama. To form OGMC, over 1,000 civilian and military personnel were transferred from Fort Bliss, Texas. Included was a group of German scientists and engineers led by Wernher von Braun; this group had been brought to America under Operation Paperclip. OGMC designed the Army's first short-range ballistic missile, the PGM-11 Redstone, based on the WWII German V-2 missile. Chrysler established the Missile Division to serve as the Redstone prime contractor, setting up an engineering operation in Huntsville and for production obtaining use from the U.S. Navy of a large plant in Sterling Heights, Michigan. The Redstone was in active service from 1958 until 1964; it was also the first missile to test-launch a live nuclear weapon, first detonated in a 1958 test in the South Pacific.

Working together, the Missile Division and von Braun's team greatly increased the capability of the Redstone, resulting in the PGM-19 Jupiter, a medium-range ballistic missile. In May 1959, a Jupiter missile launched two small monkeys into space in a nose cone; this was America's first successful flight and recovery of live space payloads. Responsibility for deploying Jupiter missiles was transferred from the Army to the Air Force; armed with nuclear warheads, they were first deployed in Italy and Turkey during the early 1960s.

=== Space boosters ===
In July 1959, NASA chose the Redstone missile as the basis for the Mercury-Redstone Launch Vehicle to be used for suborbital test flights of the Project Mercury spacecraft. Three uncrewed MRLV launch attempts were made between November 1960 and March 1961, two of which were successful. The MRLV successfully launched the chimpanzee Ham, and astronauts Alan Shepard and Gus Grissom on three suborbital flights in January, May, and July 1961, respectively.

America's more ambitious crewed space travel plans included the design of the Saturn series of heavy-lift launch vehicles by a team headed by Wernher von Braun. Chrysler's Huntsville operation, then designated the Space Division, became Marshall Space Flight Center's prime contractor for the first stage of the Saturn I and Saturn IB versions. The design was based on a cluster of Redstone and Jupiter fuel tanks and Chrysler built it for the Apollo program in the Michoud Assembly Facility in East New Orleans, one of the largest manufacturing plants in the world. Between October 1961 and July 1975, NASA used ten Saturn Is and nine Saturn IBs for suborbital and orbital flights, all of which were successful; Chrysler missiles and boosters never suffered a launch failure. The division was also a subcontractor which modified one of the mobile launcher platforms for use with the Saturn IB rockets using Saturn V infrastructure.

== See also ==
- Carl Breer
- Chrysler Building
- Chrysler World Headquarters and Technology Center
- Chrysler Hemi engine
- Chrysler Proving Grounds
- Frederick Morrell Zeder
- History of Chrysler
- Lee Iacocca
- List of automobile manufacturers of the United States
- List of Chrysler engines
- List of Chrysler factories
- List of Chrysler platforms
- List of Chrysler vehicles
- Mopar
- Owen Ray Skelton
- Virginia Sink
- Seida
- The Three Musketeers (Studebaker engineers)
- Walter P. Chrysler Museum
- Maxwell-Chalmers Automobiles
- United States Motor Company
- American Motors Corporation

=== Countries ===
- Chrysler Fevre Argentina - sold to Volkswagen in 1980
- Chrysler Kamyon Turkey - sold to the ASKAM in 2003.
- Fiat Chrysler Australia
- Stellantis Canada
