= Chrysler Corporation Loan Guarantee Act of 1979 =

United States federal statute

- Long title: An Act to authorize loan guarantees to the Chrysler Corporation for financial assistance.
- Enacted by: the 96th United States Congress
- Effective: January 7, 1980

Citations
- Public law: Pub. L. 96–185
- Statutes at Large: 93 Stat. 1324

Legislative history
- Introduced in the House of Representatives as H.R. 5860 by James Blanchard (D–MI) on November 1, 1979; Passed the House of Representatives on December 13, 1979 (271–136); Passed the Senate on December 21, 1979 (53–44); Signed into law by President Jimmy Carter on

The Chrysler Corporation Loan Guarantee Act of 1979 is a federal statute enacted to provide federal loan guarantees to the Chrysler Corporation in response to the company's financial crisis. Signed into law by President Jimmy Carter, the act authorized up to $1.5 billion in federal loan guarantees, enabling Chrysler to avoid bankruptcy.

The bill, formally known as H.R. 5860, was sponsored by Representative James Blanchard (D-MI). The House of Representatives then passed the bill by 271–136 on December 13, 1979. On December 21, 1979, the Senate voted 53–44 to pass the bill. President Carter signed the bill into law on January 7, 1980.

== Background ==
In the late 1970s, American automakers struggled to keep up with the evolving market, which left Chrysler–one of the “Big Three” American automobile manufacturers–at the verge of bankruptcy. Chrysler’s bankruptcy was projected to result in a significant number of job losses, reduced federal and local revenues, and an end to the automobile industry in America. Chrysler’s president at the time, Lee Iacocca, with the plan of preventing the company's failure, approached Congress and secured a bailout from the federal government. Congress later passed the Chrysler Corporation Loan Guarantee Act of 1979, which re-stabilized the company, signed and approved by President Jimmy Carter in January of 1980, authorized $1.5 billion in federal loan guarantees to the Chrysler Corporation, making it the largest government bailout of a private company at the time.

== Provisions ==
The Chrysler Corporation Loan Guarantee Act of 1979:

- Authorized up to $1.5 billion in federal loan guarantees.
- Required Chrysler to implement cost-cutting measures, which included the sale of assets, reforms and labor concessions.
- Established the Chrysler Loan Guarantee Board, an overseeing body that consisted of officials from the Department of Treasury, the Federal Reserve, and the Comptroller General of the United States.
- Protect the taxpayers’ interests as well as minimizing any risk of financial loss that the federal government could endure.
- Chrysler was required to provide collateral, which included liens on many such company assets, which in time would reduce the likelihood that taxpayers in any event would be subjected to paying the cost of Chrysler’s failure.
- Chrysler shall report on a regular basis to Congress along with the board, ensuring transparency throughout the entirety of the recovery process.
