= Christian Meunier =

French-American businessman

- Born: May 1967 (age 59)
- Education: EDHEC Business School
- Occupation: Businessman
- Title: Chairman of Nissan Americas

Christian Meunier is a French-American businessman who has been Chairman of Nissan Americas since January 2025. He previously served as CEO of Jeep and held executive roles at Nissan and Infiniti.

== Biography ==
=== Education and personal life ===
Christian Meunier was born in May 1967. He graduated from EDHEC Business School in France. He holds both French and American citizenship, and is the father of three children.

=== Professional career ===
Christian Meunier began his career in the automotive sector at Ford and later held senior roles at Mercedes-Benz and Land Rover in France. He joined Nissan in 2002, where he held various global and regional leadership roles, including overseeing sales and marketing in Europe and Canada.

In January 2019, Meunier was appointed Chairman of Infiniti. In May 2019, he was named Global President of Jeep before becoming its CEO in 2021.

During his tenure, Jeep developed its hybrid offering and experimented with self-driving technology. He oversaw the electrification of Jeep's product line, including the launch of the Wrangler 4xe and the development of the Jeep Recon and Wagoneer S.

In May 2024, Meunier stepped down from his role as CEO of Jeep after three years. He was succeeded by Antonio Filosa. He became Chairman of Nissan Americas in January 2025.
