= Chrysler ETV-1 =

Passenger car produced by Chrysler as a test bed for motor and drive controls

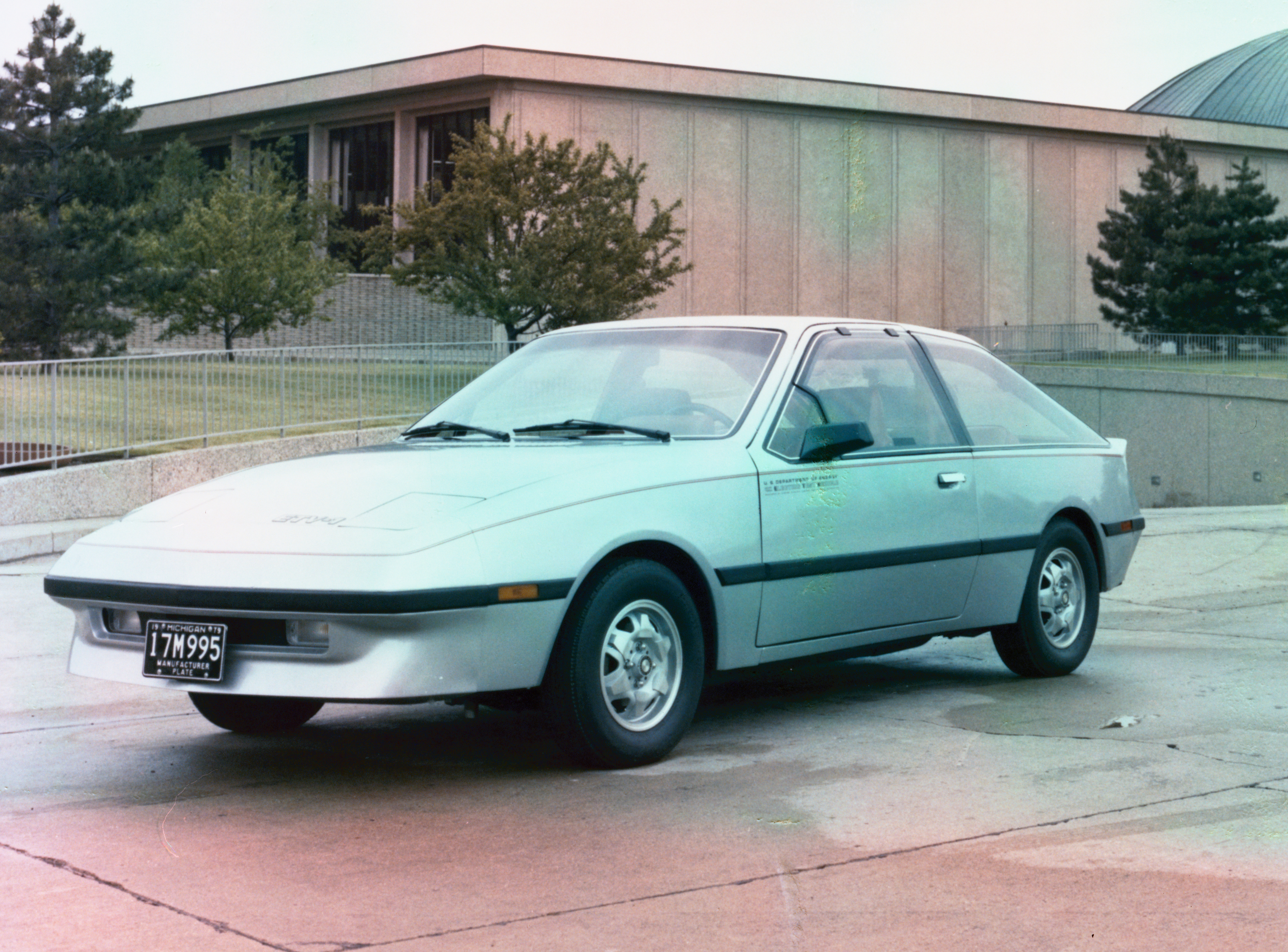

Overview
- Manufacturer: Chrysler
- Production: 1979
- Assembly: United States

Body and chassis
- Class: Concept car
- Body style: 2-door electric coupe
- Layout: Front-engine, front-wheel-drive

Powertrain
- Electric motor: 31 kW (41 hp)
- Transmission: ???-speed automatic
- Range: 112–193 km (70–120 mi)

Dimensions
- Wheelbase: 2,489 mm (98.0 in)
- Length: 4,303 mm (169.4 in)
- Width: 1,669 mm (65.7 in)
- Height: 1,311 mm (51.6 in)
- Curb weight: 1,778 kg (3,920 lb)

The Chrysler ETV-1 was a passenger car glider produced by Chrysler as a test bed for motor and drive controls. With a motor produced by General Electric, it was claimed to be the "first ground up modern day electric vehicle design."

Two vehicles were produced: ETV-1 and ETV-1-2. While the original is in private hands, the second is in the Boyertown Museum of Historic Vehicles in Boyertown, Pennsylvania.

== Specifications ==
=== Powertrain ===
The ETV-1 uses one 30.5 kW (40.9 hp) separately excited electric motor, front-mounted driving the front axle. Chrysler's ETV-1 has claimed acceleration of 0 to 48 km/h (0 to 30 mph) in 9.0 seconds and a claimed top speed of 105 km/h (65 mph).

=== Battery ===
ETV-1 utilises a removable T-shaped battery pack of 18 6V Globe-Union EV2-13 batteries. The electric vehicle battery pack has a total capacity of approximately 12.7 kWh based on load-leveled test of the production Globe EV-1000 version of the EV2-13 hand-built batteries used in the ETV-1 pack.

Video about the Chrysler Electric Car ETV 1 program
