= Lycée français Charles Lepierre =

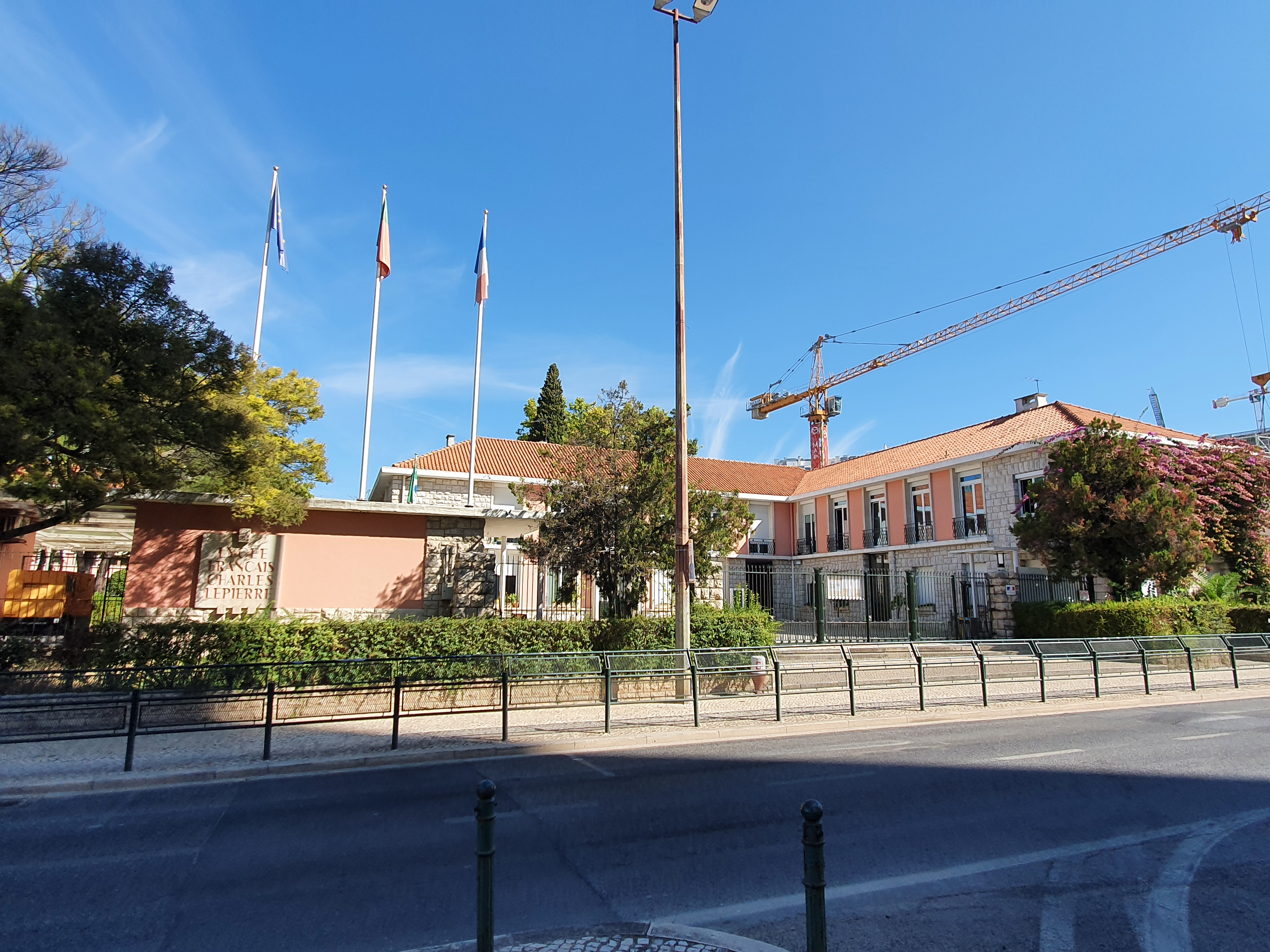

Location
- Avenida Duarte Pacheco, 32; 1070-112 Lisbon; Portugal
- Coordinates: 38.7242°N 9.1638°W

Information
- Established: 1907
- Enrollment: 1765
- Language: French
- Website: lfcl-lisbonne.eu

Lycée français Charles Lepierre is an international school in Lisbon, Portugal. The medium of instruction is French.

In 1907, a French-medium school was opened on Rua da Emenda by the Société de l’École Française de Lisbonne. In 1917 the school moved to Pátio do Tijolo in the Braancamp Palace near Largo do Rato, purchased that year by the Société de l’École Française de Lisbonne. In 1952, the school moved to its current location.

The school is named after Professor Charles Lepierre (1867-1945), a chemical engineer who graduated from the École de Physique et Chimie Industrielle de Paris, who was a student of Pierre Curie and who moved to Portugal in 1888. He was a university professor at Coimbra University initially, at the micro-biology laboratory, then at the Instituto Superior Técnico in Lisbon. His areas of research were chemistry, micro-biology and public health. He was responsible for founding the first industrial chemical engineering course in Portugal.

It is directly operated by the Agency for French Education Abroad (AEFE), an agency under the French foreign ministry. The school follows the official instructions of France's Ministry of National Education.

== Levels in the school ==
The school is divided into the following sections:

- Maternelle (Kindergarten): children are accepted from the age of 3. Kindergarten has 3 years known as Petite Section, Moyenne Section and Grande Section .
- Primaire (Primary school): from Cours Préparatoire (12ème) to Cours Moyen 2 (7ème) has 5 years.
- Collège (Middle School) : from Sixième (6ème) to Troisième (3ème). Pupils sit the diplôme national du brevet at the end of Troisième.
- Lycée (High School): from Seconde (2ème) to Terminale. Pupils will sit the Baccalauréat exams in Primaire and Terminale.

== Further details ==
- The current Enrolment is 2100 pupils.
- The School year is from September to the end of June.
- The syllabus follows the French Education Ministry guidelines and is delivered in French. The following languages are taught:
  - Portuguese is mandatory for all years. The Lycée has policy of teaching Portuguese, as the language of the host country, to all pupils from Kindergarten to Seconde based on the Portuguese Education Ministry guidelines and at national level. For those joining the Lycée from 6ème and non-portuguese national, can be taught as a foreign language based on the French Education Ministry guidelines. The syllabus does include Portuguese civilisation and history & geography, taught in portuguese for certains secondary years.
  - English is taught as the first foreign language (Langue Vivante 1)
  - The Lycée provides the choice of German, Italian or Spanish as the Second foreign language (LV2)
  - Classical language: Latin is provided as option from 5ème onwards till 3ème.
  - The head master is Pascale Gautrot-Lamoureux and the directory of moyenne section to CM2 is Agnes Favretto and Christophe Mahiout.

. And the CPE are is Julia Marino and Sami El Yagoubi
