= Antonio Filosa =

Italian business executive (born 1973)

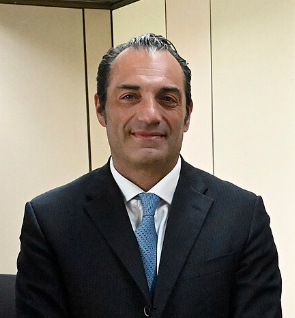
- Born: June 26, 1973 (age 53); Castellammare di Stabia, Italy
- Citizenship: Italy; Brazil
- Education: Polytechnic University of Milan
- Occupation: Business executive
- Known for: CEO of Stellantis, former CEO of Jeep

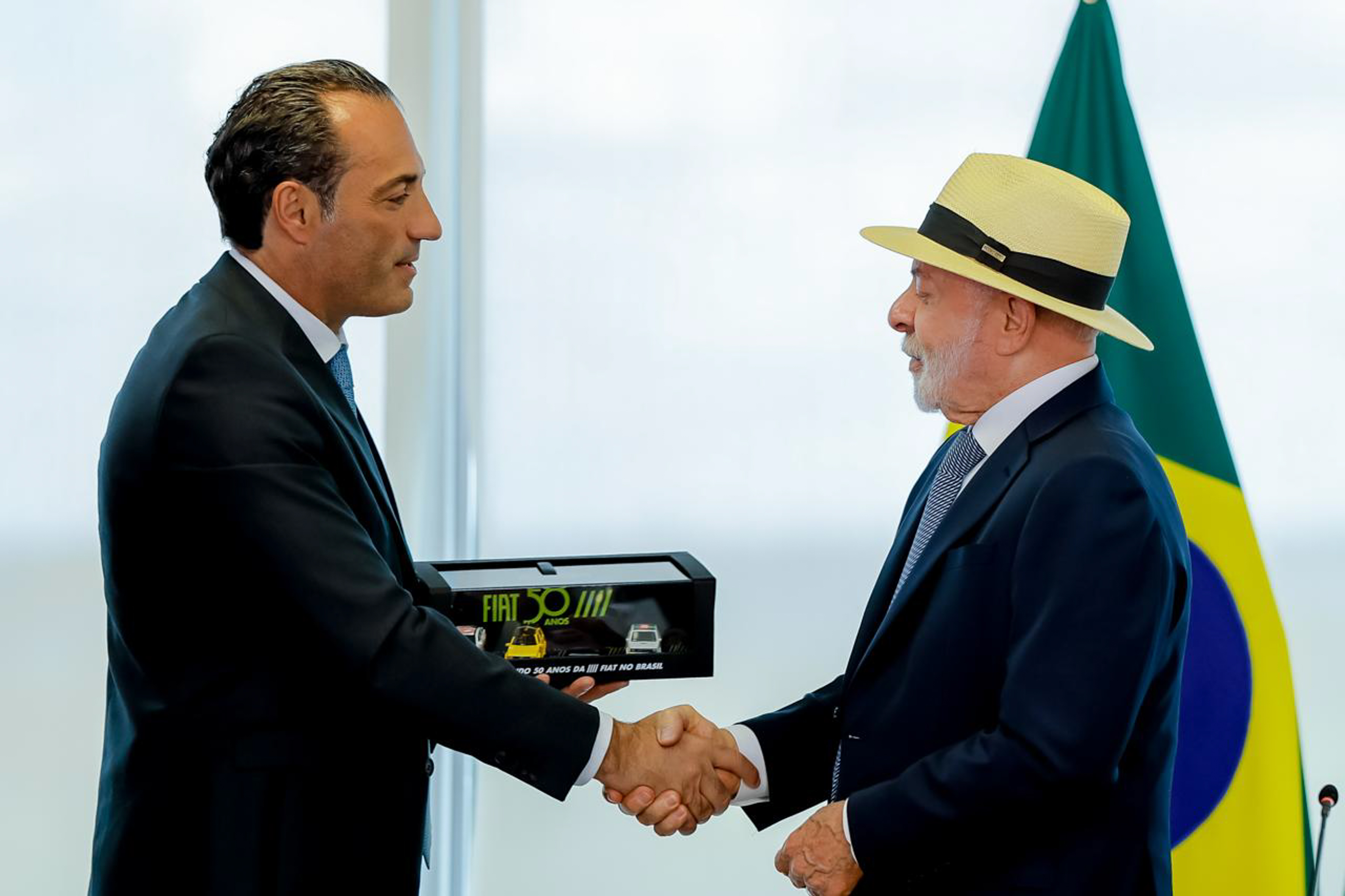
Antonio Filosa and Lula da Silva

Antonio Filosa (born June 26, 1973) is an Italian business executive who has been chief executive officer (CEO) of the automotive group Stellantis since June 2025, succeeding Carlos Tavares. He is also chief operating officer (COO), of Stellantis North America. He previously held leadership roles at Fiat, FCA, and Stellantis, including CEO of the Jeep brand and head of operations in South America.

== Early life and education ==
Antonio Filosa was born in Castellammare di Stabia, Naples, Italy, on June 26, 1973. He graduated with a degree in industrial engineering from the Polytechnic University of Milan and later earned an Executive MBA from Fundação Dom Cabral in Brazil.

== Career ==
Filosa began his career in 1999 at Fiat, holding various positions in Europe (including Spain) and South America. From 2005, he focused on Fiat Chrysler Automobiles (FCA) operations in South America, becoming chief operating officer for the region in 2018. He retained this role after the merger of FCA with PSA to form Stellantis in 2021.

In November 2023, Filosa was appointed CEO of the Jeep brand, replacing Christian Meunier. His mandate included reversing declining sales, particularly in the North American market, where Stellantis had lost market share. As of 2025 Jeep sales have been in decline since 2019.

On May 28, 2025, Filosa was named CEO of Stellantis, succeeding Carlos Tavares, whose departure followed a profit and sales decline in 2024. His appointment was seen as a strategic move to restore confidence and revitalize the company's strategy under the chairmanship of John Elkann.

== Personal life ==
Filosa is married with two children. He is a dual citizen of Italy and Brazil.
