= Carlos Tavares =

Portuguese automotive business executive (born 1958)

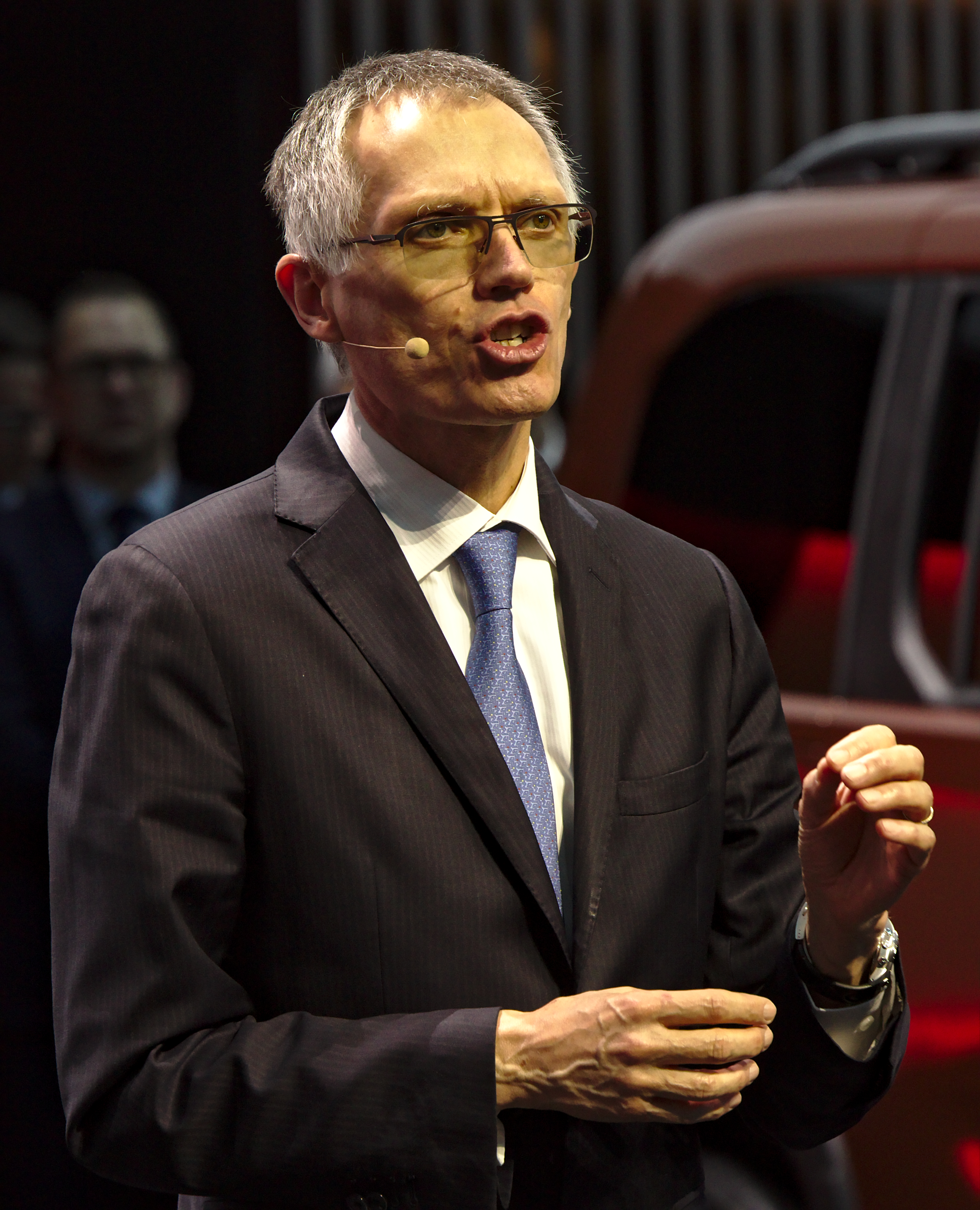
- Tavares in 2018
- Born: Carlos Antunes Tavares Dias; 14 August 1958 (age 68); Lisbon, Portugal
- Education: Lycée français Charles-Lepierre; École Centrale Paris
- Occupation: automotive executive
- Employer(s): Stellantis; Renault; Nissan
- Title: CEO (Stellantis); COO (Renault); Exec. VP (Nissan)
- Predecessor: at Stellantis, none (founding CEO)
- Successor: John Elkann (chair, Interim Executive Committee); Antonio Filosa (as CEO)
- Children: 3

Carlos Antunes Tavares Dias (born 14 August 1958) is a Portuguese business executive, primarily in the automotive sector. He was the chief executive officer (CEO) of Stellantis from January 2021 to December 2024 (when it was the world's fourth largest automaker by sales), a conglomerate that was formed by a merger that he had overseen, that of the PSA Group and Fiat Chrysler Automobiles. Earlier, he was chief operating officer (COO) at Renault.

== Early life ==
Born Carlos Antunes Tavares Dias on 14 August 1958 in Lisbon, Portugal, Carlos Tavares' mother was a French teacher ("enseignait la langue de Molière") at his French Lyceum in Lisbon, and his father was a chartered accountant working for a French insurer. Tavares' passion for cars has been traced to the young Carlos, age 14-years, when he discovered motor racing during an open day at the Estoril circuit, near Lisbon. Passionate about cars, Tavares volunteered at that age, to be a track marshal on that circuit.

After studying at the Lycée français Charles-Lepierre in Lisbon, he left his native country for France at the age of 17 to follow a preparatory course in maths at the Lycée Pierre-de-Fermat in Toulouse. He then graduated as an engineer from the École Centrale Paris in 1981.

== Career ==
=== Renault ===
Carlos Tavares held different positions within the Renault Group. Tavares started his career at Renault, at the age of 23, as a test-driving engineer in 1981. He was director of the Renault Mégane II project.

Between 2004 and 2011, he worked for Nissan, Renault's partner in the Renault–Nissan Alliance (now Renault–Nissan–Mitsubishi Alliance), first as programme director and then as vice-president, product strategy and product planning. In 2005 Tavares was appointed executive vice-president, joining the board of directors. By 2009, he oversaw Nissan's presence in North and South America.

By 2011, he moved back to Renault to become chief operating officer, the number two executive under Carlos Ghosn, the chairman and chief executive officer of Renault and Nissan. Tavares had much in common with Ghosn, as both were "raised in Portuguese-speaking environments. Both went on to graduate from French Grandes Ecoles and - perhaps less surprisingly - both like fast cars." However, on 15 August 2013, Tavares said publicly that he wanted to become CEO at an automaker. It was said that Tavares was ambitious and sought more responsibilities at Renault, however, Ghosn was only four years older and had no plans to step aside soon. Reportedly, Ghosn demanded that Tavares apologize to staff for the gaffe and Tavares refused. Instead he resigned from Renault on 29 August 2013.

=== PSA Group ===
Tavares became CEO and chairman of the board of Groupe PSA in 2014, replacing Philippe Varin. During his tenure, he spearheaded cost-cutting measures and increased the company's market share in China, which returned Groupe PSA to profitability after several years of losses. In 2014, DS Automobiles was established as a stand-alone brand under his leadership.

As CEO, Tavares garnered praise for PSA's acquisition of Opel and Vauxhall from General Motors, for PSA's record sales and profits, and for Opel and Vauxhall's subsequent return to profitability; however, PSA sales in China slipped. Furthermore, he led PSA into its merger with Fiat Chrysler Automobiles.

In 2023, the Stellantis board approved nearly $40 million in compensation to Tavares. While overseeing the Jeep, Chrysler, and Peugeot major car brands, Tavares faced criticism over that level of compensation alongside statements he made about rising food and automobile costs; specifically, his discussions about inflation included suggestions that consumers should simply expect to pay more for things (e.g., for "more expensive burgers") as a result of inflationary pressures.

=== Stellantis ===
In January 2021, PSA Group merged with Fiat Chrysler Automobiles to form Stellantis where he became its first CEO. At the Stellantis first press conference, Tavares said he planned to save 5 billion euros a year by way of investments, engine and platform sharing and development. He also announced that he wanted to relaunch the most fragile brands which could benefit from new investments.

During the 2022 French presidential election, incumbent President Emmanuel Macron and opposing candidate Marine Le Pen both called Tavares' 2021 compensation package "shocking". The package was around 19 million euros ($20.5 million), plus a stock package worth some additional 32 million euros and long-term compensation of about 25 million euros.

As the CEO, Tavares has raised concerns of an "invasion" from Chinese EV companies and, along with the American carmaker Tesla, are offering more affordable models compared to their European competitors. From 2021 to 2022, the European market share of Chinese EV manufacturers doubled to almost 9%.

At the end of September 2024, the Stellantis board of directors launched a procedure to prepare his succession even though his mandate ran until 2026.

On 1 December 2024, Tavares abruptly resigned as CEO, and the board accepted his resignation; a new interim executive committee, chaired by John Elkann, was established to identify a new CEO.

Under Tavares's leadership, Stellantis's net profits fell 70% in 2024 and stock value fell by over 50% from its early 2024 peak, while its North American and European market share shrank by 5%.

=== Other activities ===
==== Racing ====
Tavares was an amateur racing driver since the age of twenty-two. In 1983, he started driving in rallies and endurance races with friends Bruno Cébile (as co-driver) and Arnaud Montagné (as technical assistant), and as such, they participated in the Monte-Carlo Rally. In 2014—with Jean-Louis Dauger, Denis Gibaud, and Jérôme Maudet—Tavares won the A2 class of the Barcelona 24 Hours in a Peugeot RCZ Cup of the Milan Competition racing group.

In addition, Tavares runs his own team, Clementeam Racing, named in recognition of his daughter.

==== Boards ====
Tavares has been a member of various boards of directors, including of:

- Faurecia (between 2014 and 2019);
- Airbus (between 2016 and 2022); and
- Total (between 2017 and 2020).

== Awards and recognition ==
In 2019, Tavares won the 'Manager of the Year' award at the 15th edition of BFM Awards. Later, in 2020, he was given the award of 'World Car Person of the year'. In 2022, Tavares was chosen as the 'Eurostar' for Group CEO by Automotive News Europe.

== Personal life ==
Tavares is married and father of three daughters.

He collects classic cars, including a Porsche 912 from 1966, an Alpine A110 from 1976, and a Peugeot 504 V6 Coupé from 1979.

Tavares is also known to be close to the former Prime Minister of Portugal José Sócrates.

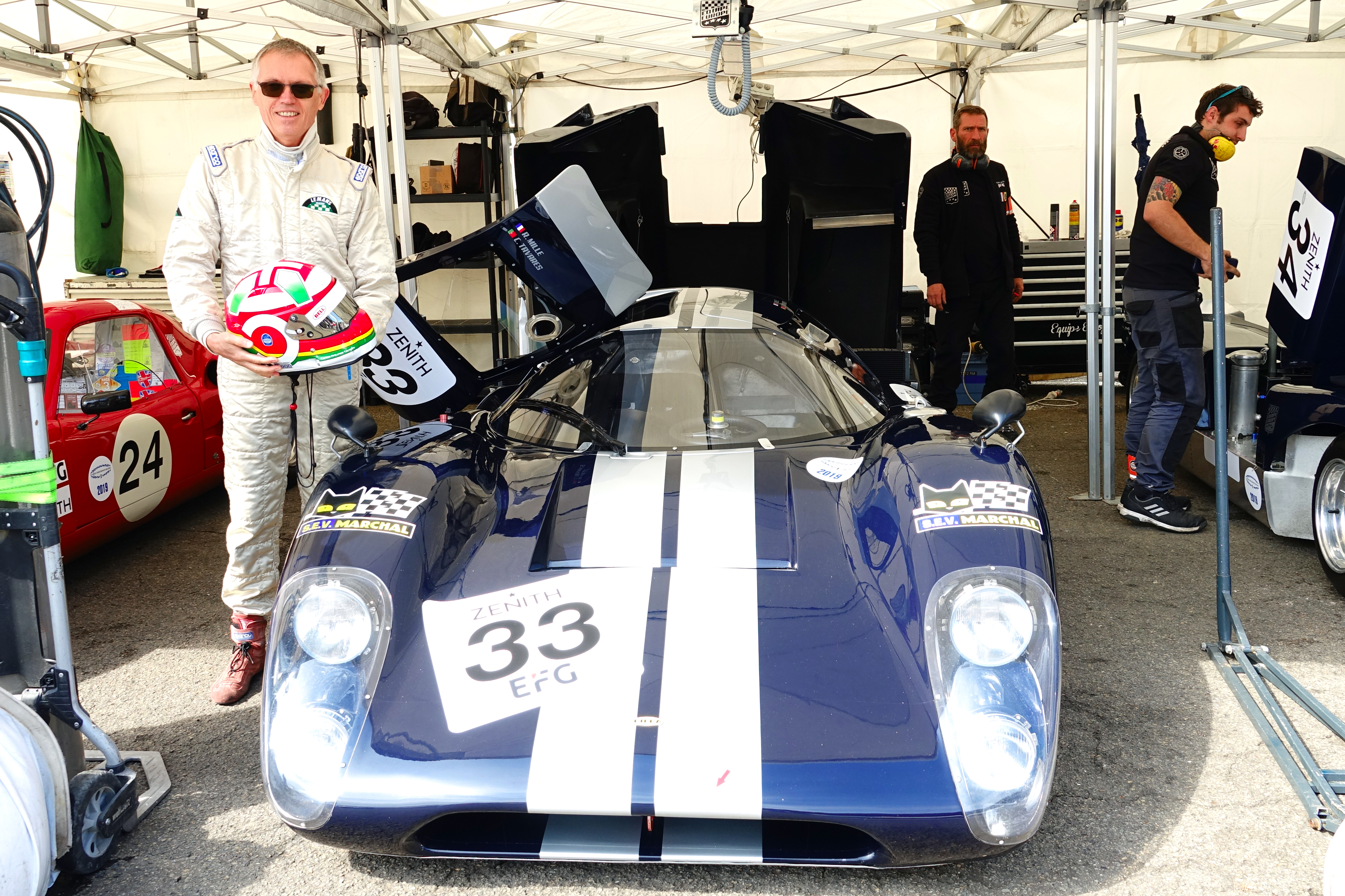
Carlos Tavares at the Spa Classic in 2019

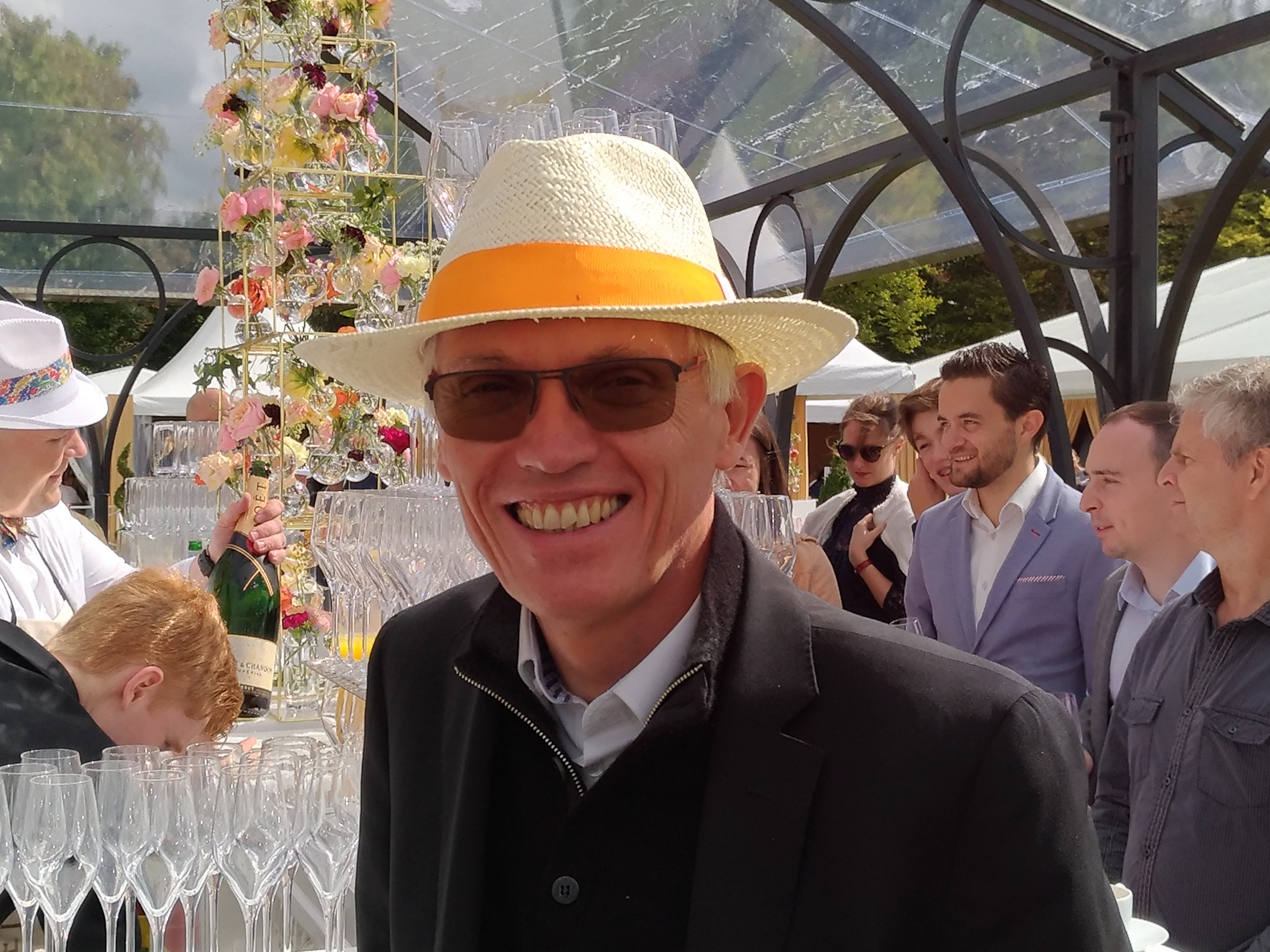
Carlos Tavares at the Chantilly Arts & Elegance in 2017

He has been a member of the jury at Chantilly Arts & Elegance Richard Mille in 2017 and 2019, an automobile elegance competition.

After resigning from his role as Stellantis CEO, Tavares is reportedly living on a farm in Santarém, Portugal, making port wine in a vineyard he also owns in the Douro valley, alongside several hotels.
