= Owen Ray Skelton =

American automotive engineer (1886–1969)

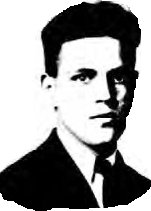
- Skelton in 1920
- Born: February 9, 1886; Edgerton, Ohio, U.S.
- Died: July 20, 1969 (aged 83); Palm Beach, Florida, U.S.
- Occupations: Engineer, automobile designer

Owen Ray Skelton (February 9, 1886 – July 20, 1969) was an American automotive industry engineer and automobile designer. Along with Fred M. Zeder and Carl Breer, he was one of the core group who formed the present day Chrysler Corporation. He made material contributions to Tourist Automobile Company, Allis-Chalmers, Studebaker, and was the main engineer behind the Chrysler Airflow automobile. He was elected to the Automotive Hall of Fame in 2002.

== Early life ==
Skelton was born on February 9, 1886, and went by the nickname "Skelt" from when he was a child. His family lived in Edgerton, Ohio, at the time of his birth. His father was a shopkeeper selling horse harnesses and saddlery. Skelton worked as a shop apprentice at his father's shop part-time in his youth. He went to the local public schools as a child and after graduating from high school he enrolled at Ohio State University. He graduated with a degree in mechanical engineering when he was nineteen.

== Career ==
From 1905 until 1907, Skelton's first job in the automotive industry was with the Pope-Toledo automobile factory in Toledo, Ohio, noted for their gasoline-powered engine technology. He advanced to the design drafting department at Detroit's Packard Motor Car Company. As he became more experienced with expertise, Skelton simultaneously gained the reputation of being a design analyst who understood the entire transmission of a car, and a master specialist in rear axles and gear boxes.

Skelton was one of the partners who designed the Benham automobile from 1914 to 1916. The startup firm failed to sell the automobile. Its construction appealed to another automaker also interested in streamlined design, Studebaker. The South Bend, Indiana, firm vice president and chief engineer, Frederick Morrell Zeder, offered Skelton an engineering position redesigning their drive trains transmissions, and rear axles. Skelton accepted Studebaker's pay offer of 58 U.S. cents (equivalent to $19 in 2025) per hour. The money-losing Studebaker needed to produce a speedy design for a new, inexpensive, mass-market automobile that could compete with the two new automobile conglomerates, Ford Motor Company and General Motors (GM). The struggling firm set up a design shop in Newark, and gave a relatively free hand to the shop's three principals, Zeder, Skelton, and Carl Breer. The threesome became known as "The Three Musketeers" for their design work of the 1918 Studebaker.

=== ZSB Engineering ===
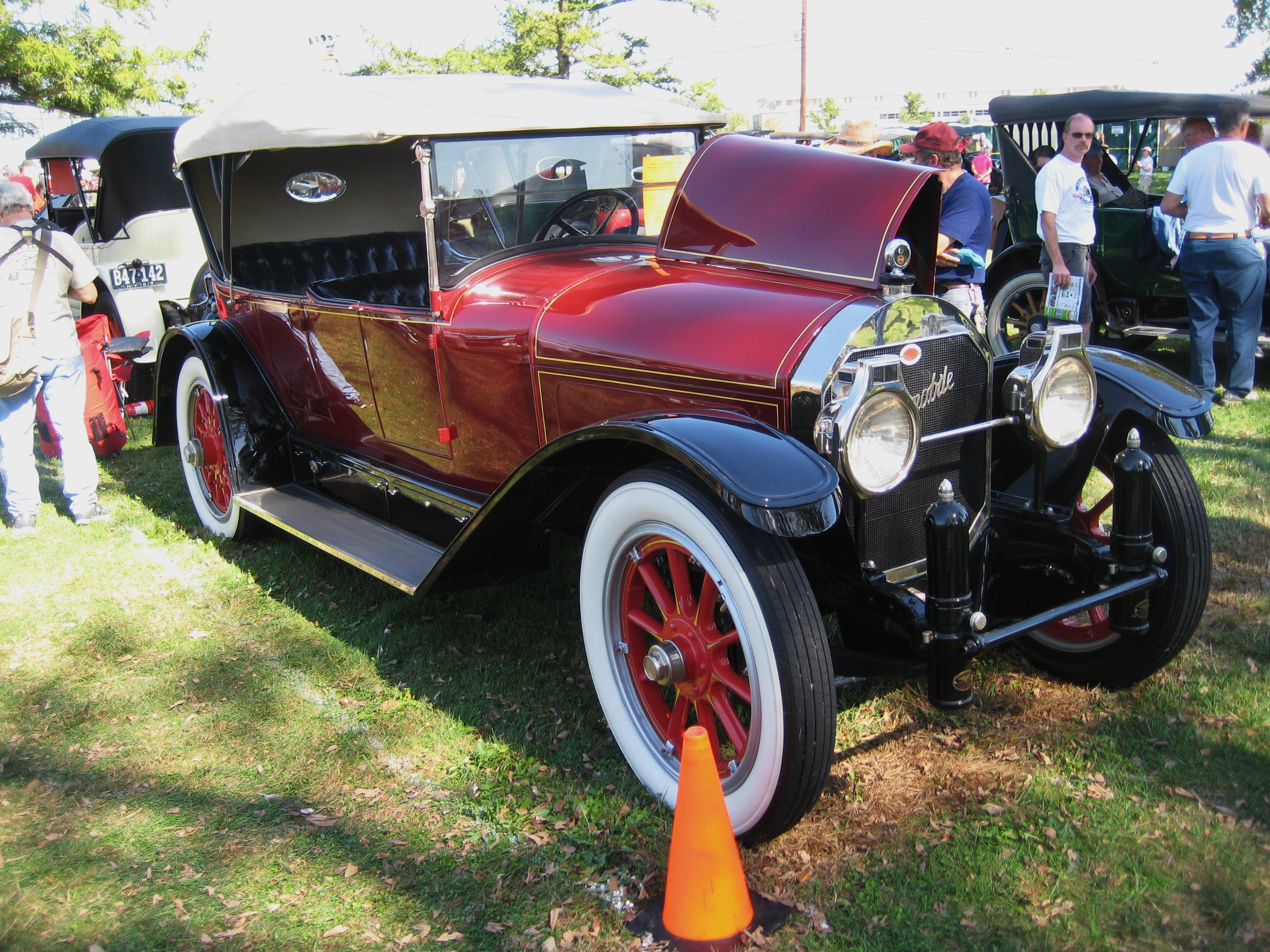
Durant's Locomobile contained a pioneering six-cylinder engine, partly designed by Skelton.

In 1921 Zeder, Skelton, Breer, and several associates left Studebaker to start an independent Newark automobile design-and-engineering firm, "ZSB Engineering." The luxury-oriented Daniels Motor Company hired ZSB to design their 1922 V-8, but the high-end car listed for $7,450 (equivalent to $143,000 in 2025), a prohibitive price for that day. Later in 1922, ZSB became interested in the mass market and was hired by Billy Durant on a motor design for the Flint automobile. The ZSB-designed six-cylinder engine with an updraft carburetor was later used on the Locomobile, a luxury automobile built by Durant Motors. Skelton and ZSB in the same year contracted out a concept car design, tentatively called the Zeder-Six. ZSB failed to obtain financing to complete the design work as an independent firm, but news of their work reached the ears of an aggressive car making executive, Maxwell's chief executive officer (CEO) Walter Chrysler. This contact proved to be decisive to Skelton's career.

Chrysler obtained financing in early 1923 to merge Maxwell, the Detroit-based Chalmers Motor Car Company, and ZSB Engineering. The merged firm's operations were consolidated in Detroit in June 1923, initially under the name of "Maxwell-Chalmers." With ZSB's six-cylinder engine design as an integral element, Maxwell-Chalmers's cars sold well, and the firm underwent rapid expansion under CEO Chrysler's leadership. In 1925 Maxwell-Chalmers became the Chrysler Corporation.

=== Chrysler Corporation ===
As a chief design engineer for Chrysler, Skelton is credited with leading the development of a rubber engine mount system for cars. Directed to develop ideas to reduce motor vibration, Skelton's team conceptualized more than 1,000 separate ideas; the Chrysler team combined the best concepts into a new system known as "floating power." The rubber engine mounts and other components of the system significantly reduced the transmission of engine vibration to the passenger compartment, thus smoothing the ride. This Skelton/Chrysler engineering innovation was adopted throughout the automobile industry.

Skelton also led the innovative development of four-wheel hydraulic brakes as a standard feature on Chrysler cars. His work continued to be significant in development of the rear-engine, all-steel-body Chrysler cars developed through the 1930s and into the postwar years, as Chrysler took its place as a full-fledged competitor to Ford and GM.

== Personal life ==
Skelton lived in Palm Beach, Florida, and Grosse Pointe Farms, Michigan. He was a member of the Everglades Club and Tennis Club in Palm Beach, the Grosse Pointe Club, Country Club of Detroit, and the Detroit Athletic Club. In 1931, he became a vice-president of the newly founded Chrysler Institute of Engineering. It had close ties to the University of Michigan, and awarded degrees in engineering subjects. Skelton became a member of the Chrysler board of directors in 1937. He retired from his position as an engineer with the company in 1951 and served as a director until 1954. Skelton died at the age of 83 on July 20, 1969, in Palm Beach. Funeral services and interment were in Detroit. He was survived by his wife Edith, two daughters, a stepdaughter, a brother and eleven grandchildren. Skelton was inducted into the Automotive Hall of Fame in 2002.

== Bibliography ==
- Curcio, Vincent (2001). Chrysler: The Life and Times of an Automotive Genius. Oxford University Press. ISBN 0195147057.
- Hyde, Charles K. (2003). Riding the Roller Coaster: A History of the Chrysler Corporation. Wayne State University Press. ISBN 0814330916.
- Yanik, Anthony J (1994). The Birth of Chrysler Corporation and Its Engineering Legacy (illustrated ed.). Society of Automotive Engineers. ISBN 1560915242.
