= The Three Musketeers (Studebaker engineers) =

Studebaker engineers

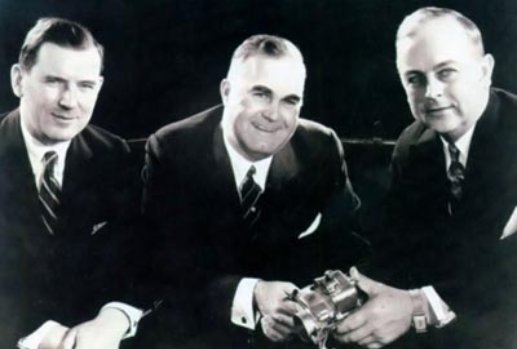
Three Musketeers - Chrysler Engineers Carl Breer (right), Fred Zeder (center), and Owen Skelton (left) in 1933.

The Three Musketeers is a nickname given to a team of three Studebaker engineers, Frederick Morrell Zeder, Owen Ray Skelton, and Carl Breer. They would become instrumental in the founding of the Chrysler Corporation, and were hand-picked by Walter Chrysler to come with him when he started the new company.

== History ==
The nucleus of the engineering team initially formed when Allis-Chalmers Manufacturing Company selected twenty-five university graduates in mechanical engineering to go through their two-year apprenticeship course. Frederick Morrell Zeder and Carl Breer were two such students, picked in 1909; they became close friends during the course. Zeder, the "front man for the team", was born in 1886; he graduated from the University of Michigan in 1909 with a degree in mechanical engineering and became an erecting engineer for the Allis-Chalmers Company in 1910. Later, he would lead a consulting firm specializing in power plant design, and join the EMF Company (which was taken over by Studebaker in 1912).

Breer, the oldest of the Musketeers, was born in 1885 as the youngest of nine children; he worked in his father's carriage and blacksmith shop, and built his own steam-powered car in 1901; he would work at Toledo Steam Cars, Spalding, Northern and White, and designed a two-cylinder opposed-cylinder car called the Duro. When Zeder became Chief Engineer of Studebaker's Detroit operations, he asked Breer to join him in 1913.

Owen Ray Skelton, the third member of the team, had started his career at Pope-Toledo in Ohio, and later came to work as a design engineer with Packard Motor Car Company as a transmission specialist. Zeder asked Skelton to join him at Studebaker in 1916, which completed the trio; they became the Zeder, Skelton and Breer Engineering (ZSB) group. Breer went about fixing mainline engine flaws and high oil consumption. Skelton worked on a new transmission, after discarding their existing transmission design. Zeder was in charge of redesigning existing models, and creating designs for new models. The three designed Studebaker's successful Light Four, Light Six and Big Six models.

=== Willys-Overland ===
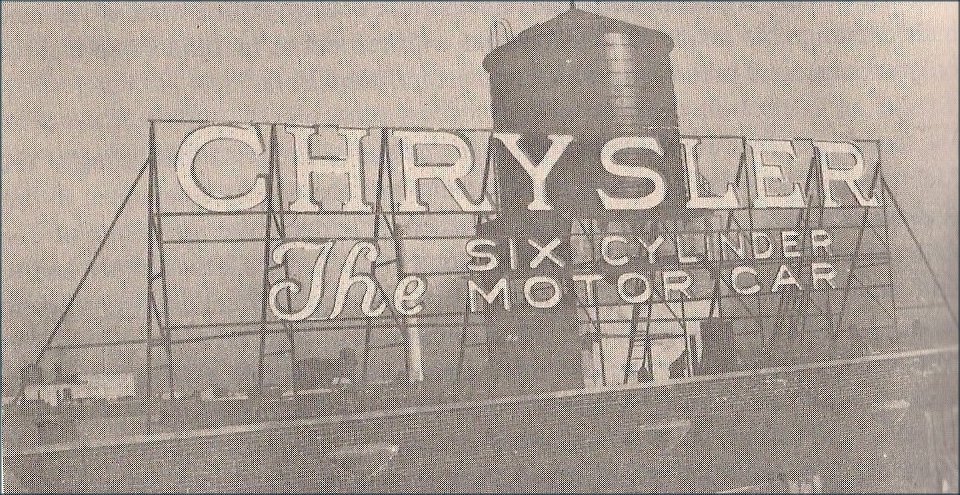
Chrysler sign 1920 on top of Willys plant

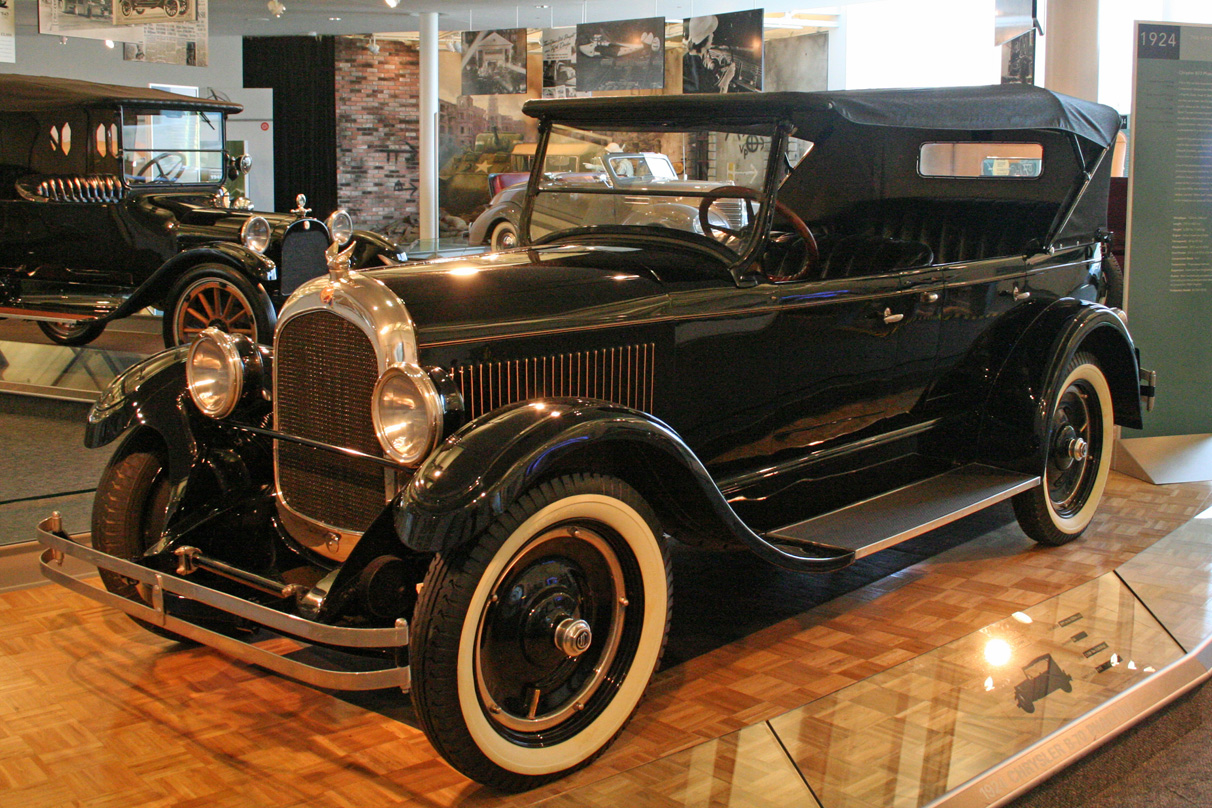
1924 Chrysler Six

Walter P. Chrysler, in January 1920, was working for Willys-Overland in Elizabeth, New Jersey as vice president and general manager. He invited the three engineers, Zeder, Breer and Skelton, to come over from Studebaker. They moved to Willys-Overland in New Jersey, taking a team of 28 Studebaker engineers with them, on July 14, 1920. The three engineers were compared by Chrysler to the fictional Three Musketeers, Athos, Porthos, and Aramis; Chrysler himself adopted the role d'Artagnan, their captain and leader. The three engineers went to work on designing a new car, with a new engine, at Willys' engineering center in Elizabeth. Their assignment was to fix engineering problems on the Willys six-cylinder car then in production, while simultaneously designing a brand-new car from the inside out. The three engineers determined that the existing six-cylinder car was obsolete compared to the ones they had just designed at Studebaker. Their new design, to be released in 1920, was to be called a "Chrysler"; a colossal sign of incandescent lights spelling that name out was erected on top of the Willys plant.

These plans were halted, however, when funds set aside for the Chrysler Motors Division of the Elizabeth plant were discovered to have been depleted by Willys' Toledo branch. Willys was going bankrupt and heading for receivership. Chrysler himself quit his position at Willys in February 1922, in the turmoil of producing the new Chrysler Six automobile, to focus on managing the Maxwell Motor Company and Chalmers Motor Company.

=== Consulting firm ===
Zeder, Breer and Skelton were embarrassed, as they had coaxed a complete team of engineers to go to Willys with them from Studebaker. Studebaker, at that time, had a plant in Detroit that was doing financially well. The three men, along with several Willys engineers, set themselves up as a consulting firm in Newark, New Jersey, under the name "Zeder Skelton Breer Engineering Company."

=== Maxwell-Chalmers ===
The Elizabeth Willys plant and the Chrysler Six prototype were sold to William C. Durant in a bankruptcy sale. The plant then built Durant's low-priced Star automobile. The Chrysler Six prototype would be made larger, becoming the 1923 Flint automobile, built in Flint, Michigan. The Chrysler Six was said to be the first modern automobile. Automobile historian Mark Howell remarked that this car was second only to Ford's Model T Ford in terms of its impact on the automobile industry. He said this car was the dividing line between the old style car and the modern automobile. Chrysler's first luxury car was priced at an affordable $1,565.

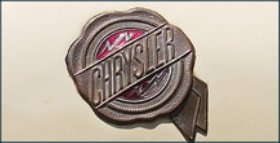
Chrysler 1924 emblem with lightning flashes

Chrysler negotiated a four-year management contract with Maxwell Motor Corporation on June 1, 1923. One of the first things he did as their new chairman was to ask engineers Zeder, Skelton, and Breer to close their consulting firm in New Jersey and come to Detroit with him. They were to do all the engineering work for the Maxwell and Chalmers cars and design a new Chrysler automobile. They agreed and arrived in Detroit on June 6, 1923.

There, in 1924, Chrysler launched his own version of the Chrysler six-cylinder. The Chrysler car was financially successful.

=== Chrysler ===
In 1925, the Maxwell car company became the Chrysler Corporation. The "lightning flashes" on the Chrysler logo were actually Zs, a tribute to Fred Zeder. This logo was used on the first Chrysler automobile built in 1924 and, off and on, for years thereafter. Zeder designed cars by a process of experimentation, where designs were tested under controlled laboratory conditions before being put into production.

The three continued to design cars for Chrysler; in 1927, Breer's wind tunnel studies would advance the state of the art in streamlining cars. In 1931, Zeder and Skelton's design of the Floating Power Plymouth (which used advanced rubber engine mounts to reduce vibration) came about in part from Zeder's friendship with Charles and William Mayo (the founders of the Mayo Clinic), with whom he observed numerous surgeries and studied the function of cartilage and connective tissue in the human body.

== Bibliography ==
- Curcio, Vincent (2001). Chrysler: The Life & Times of a Genius. Oxford University Press. ISBN 0195147057.
- Hyde, Charles K. (2003). Riding the Roller Coaster. Wayne State University Press. ISBN 9780814330913.
- Weiss, H. Eugene (2003). Chrysler, Ford, Durant: Founding Giants of Automotive Industry (illustrated ed.). McFarland. ISBN 0786416114.
- Yanik, Anthony J. (1995). The Birth of Chrysler Corporation - Its Engineering Legacy. Society of Automotive Engineers. p. 146. ISBN 1560915242.
- Yanik, Anthony J. (2009). Maxwell Motor: the Making of the Chrysler Corporation (illustrated ed.). Wayne State University Press. ISBN 978-0814334232.
