= Chrysler Airflow =

Series CU/C-1/ C-9/C-17
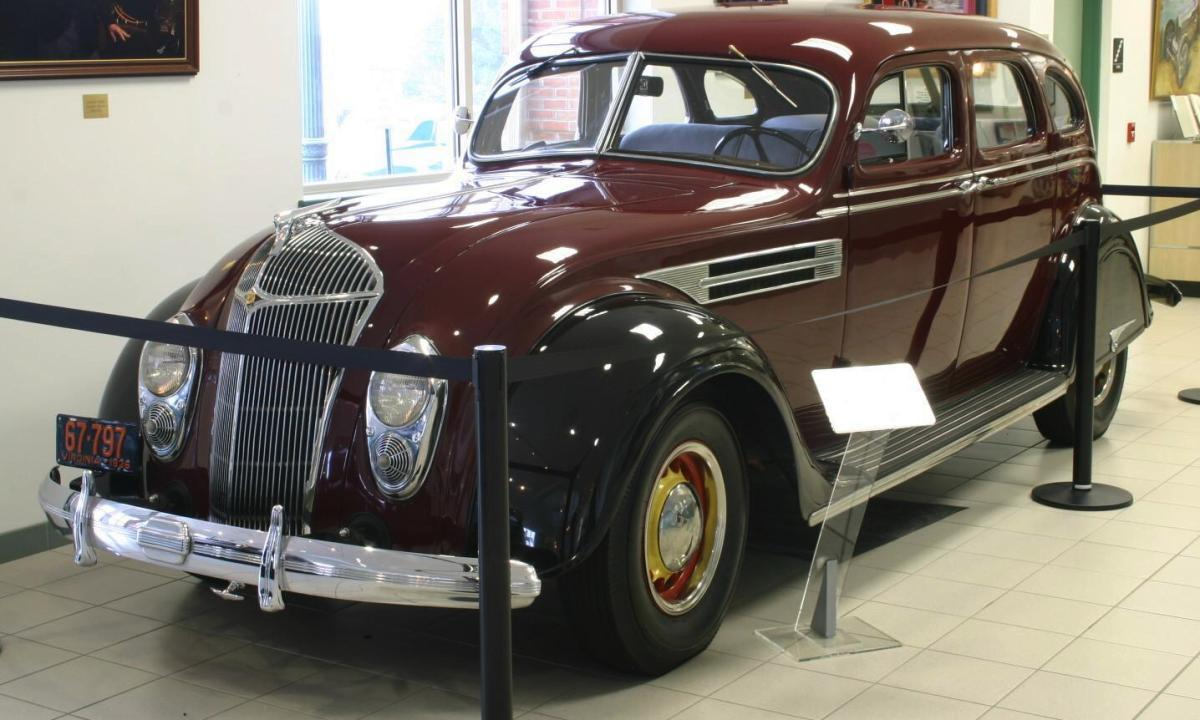
- A 1936 at the Antique Automobile Club of America Museum October 2007

Overview
- Manufacturer: Chrysler Corporation
- Production: 1934–1937 (< 29,600 built)
- Assembly: Highland Park Chrysler Plant, Highland Park, Michigan, United States
- Designer: Oliver Clark

Body and chassis
- Class: Full-size car
- Body style: 4-door sedan 2-door coupe
- Layout: FR layout
- Related: Chrysler Airstream; Chrysler Imperial; Chrysler Royal; DeSoto Airflow

Powertrain
- Engine: 299 cu in (4.9 L) Chrysler I8 (1934); 324 cu in (5.3 L) Chrysler I8 (1937)
- Transmission: 3-speed manual floor shift

Dimensions
- Wheelbase: CW Airflow Custom Imperial: 146.5 in (3,721 mm); Airflow Eight: 123.5 in (3,137 mm); CV Airflow Imperial Eight: 128.0 in (3,251 mm); CX Airflow Custom Imperial 137.5 in (3,492 mm)

Chronology
- Predecessor: Chrysler Royal

The Chrysler Airflow is a full-size car produced by Chrysler from 1934 to 1937. The Airflow was the first full-size American production car to use streamlining as a basis for building a sleeker automobile, one less susceptible to air resistance. Chrysler made a significant effort at a fundamental change in automotive design with the Chrysler Airflow, but it was ultimately a commercial failure due to a lack of market acceptance and controversial appearance.

Chrysler also marketed a companion model under the DeSoto brand, the DeSoto Airflow, and the appearance was also offered on the Chrysler Imperial. In 2022, Chrysler announced that the Airflow name would be resurrected for an electric crossover SUV.

== Origin ==
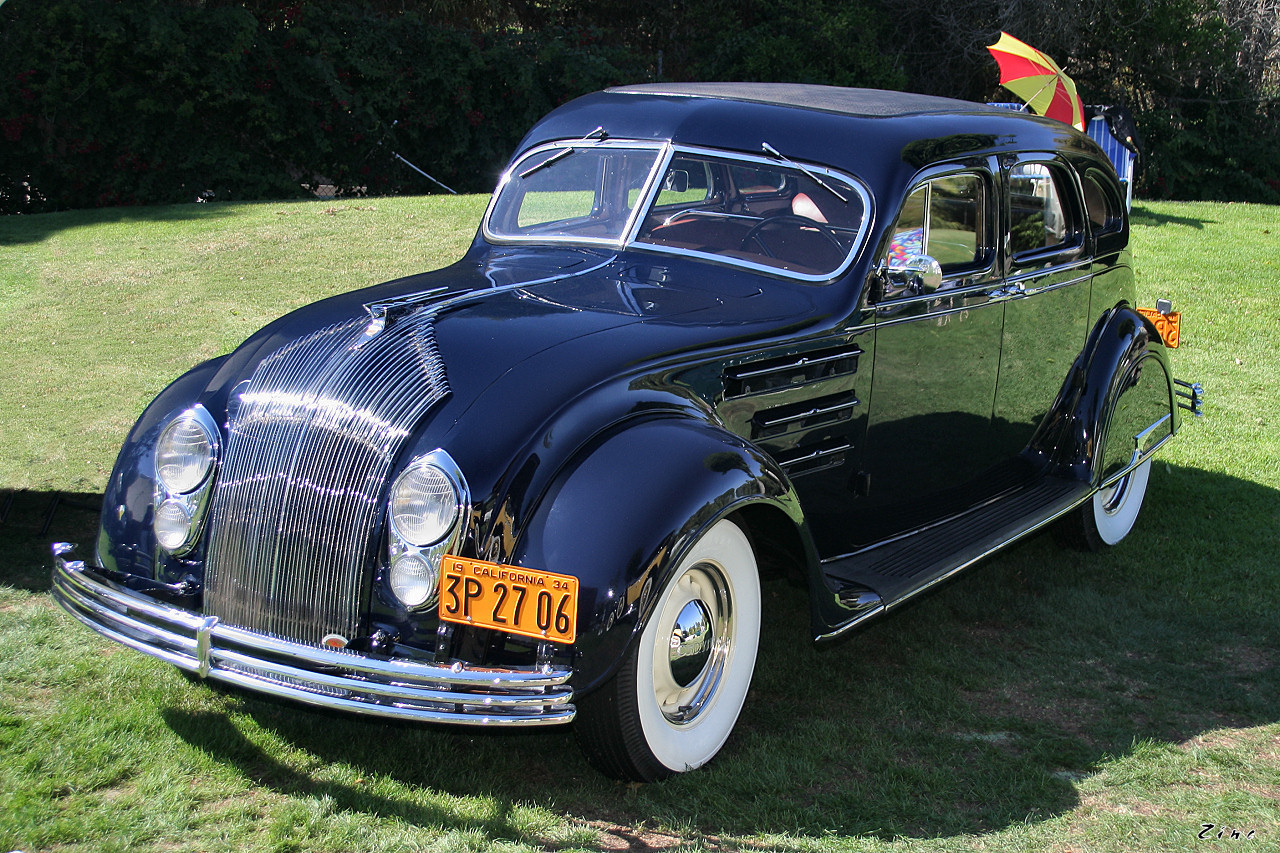
1934 Chrysler Airflow

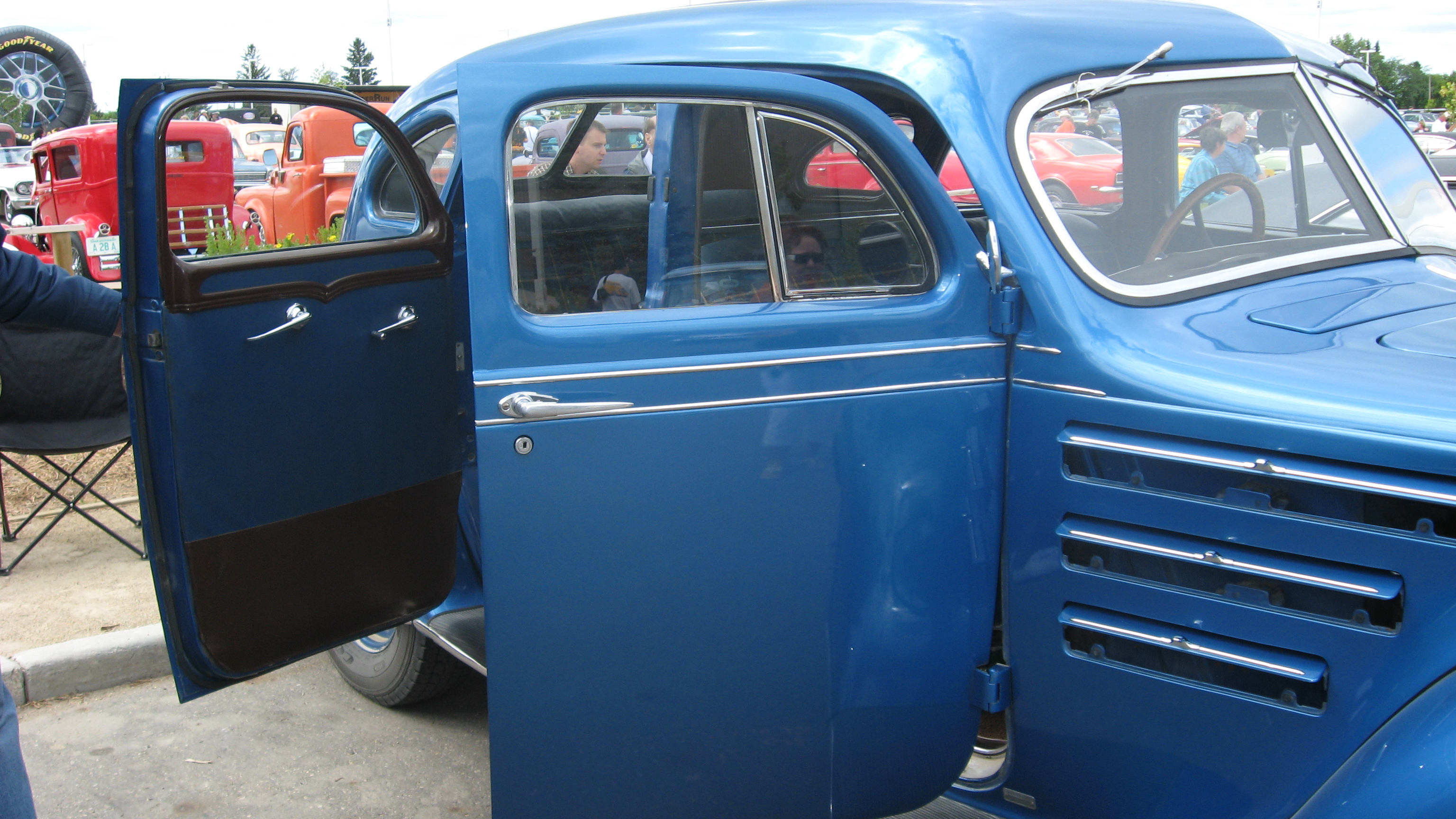
Front-opening rear doors aided entry into the back of the 1934 Airflow. The hood cooling vents are fully functional.

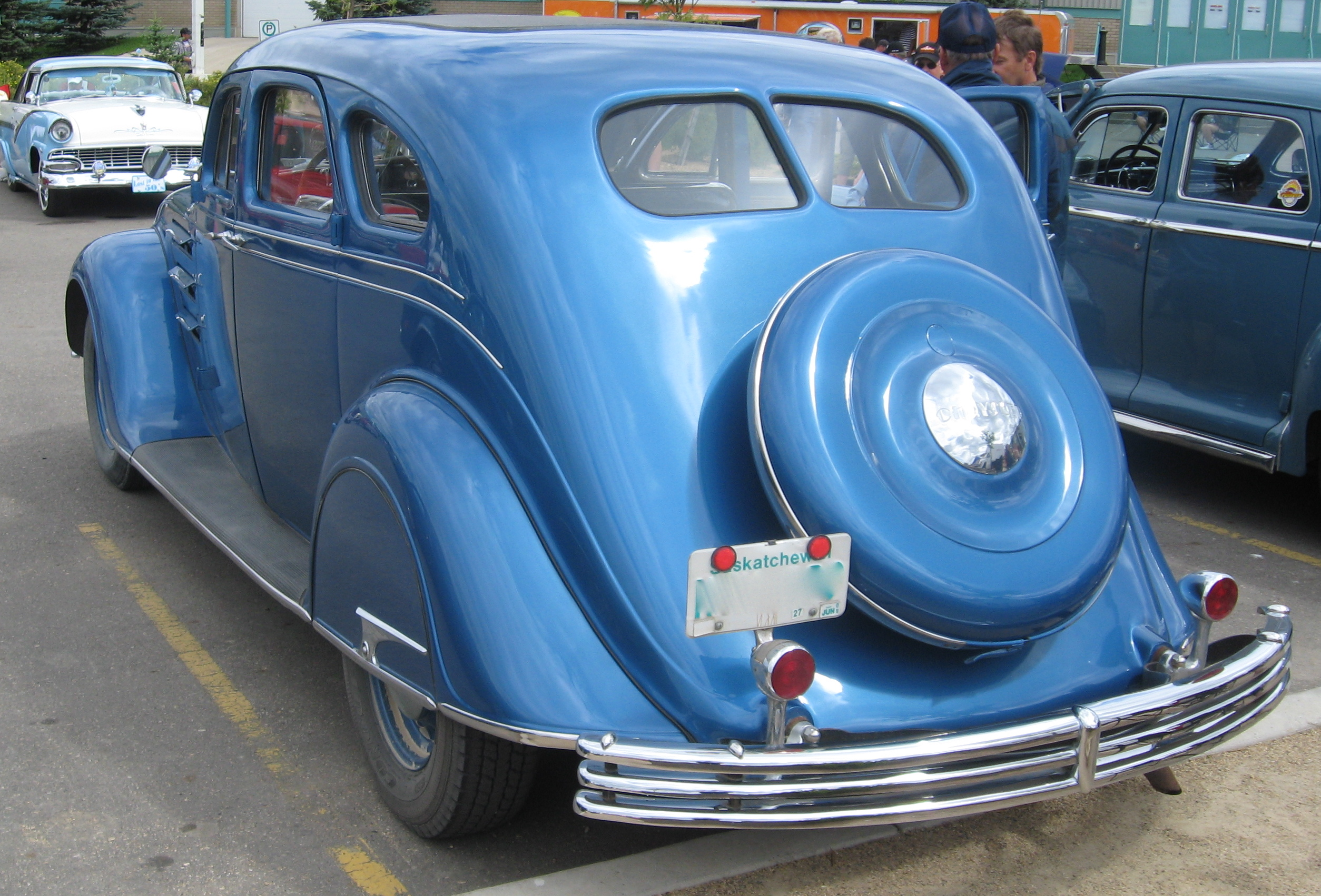
Early Airflows have no trunk; one was bolted on starting in 1936.

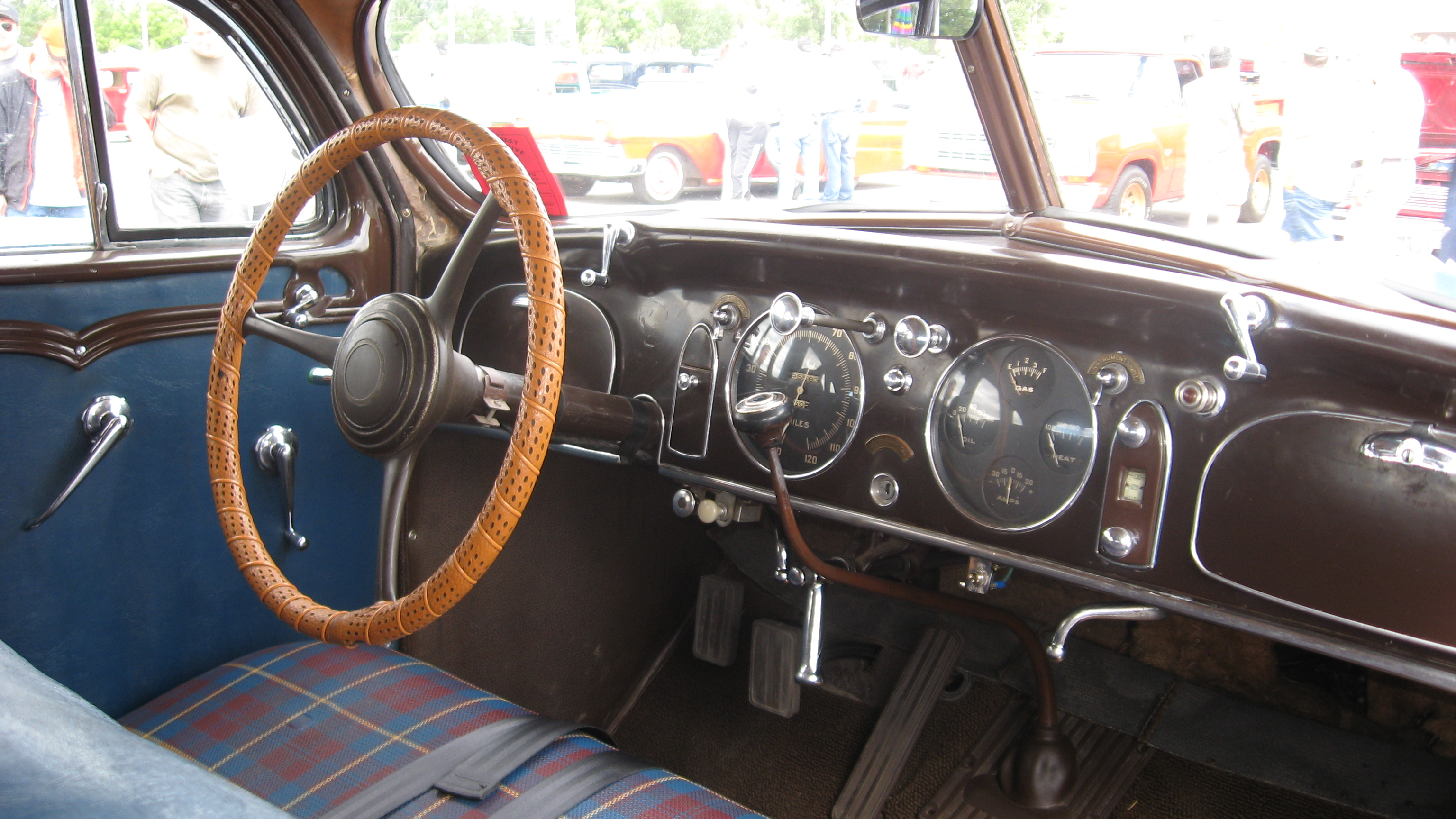
The highly stylized dashboard of a 1934 Airflow

Carl Breer, along with fellow Chrysler engineers Fred Zeder, and Owen Skelton, began a series of wind tunnel tests, with the cooperation of Orville Wright, to study which forms were the most efficient shape created by nature that could suit an automobile. Chrysler built a wind tunnel at the Highland Park site, and tested at least 50 scale models by April 1930. Their engineers found that then-current two-box automobile design was so aerodynamically inefficient that it was actually more aerodynamic when tested as if being driven backwards. Applying what they had learned about shape, the engineers also began looking into unibody construction to achieve rigidity with less weight than could be achieved with the conventional separate frame and body. The strengthening was demonstrated in a publicity reel. The car thus represented a breakthrough in lightweight-yet-strong construction, as well as increasing the power-to-drag ratio, since the lighter, more streamlined body allowed air to flow around it instead of being caught against upright forms such as radiator grilles, headlights and windshields.

Traditional automobiles of the day were the typical two-box design, with about 65% of the weight over the rear wheels. When loaded with passengers, the weight distribution tended to become further imbalanced, rising to 75% or more over the rear wheels, resulting in unsafe handling characteristics on slippery roads. Spring rates at the rear of traditional vehicles, which used leaf springs, were therefore necessarily higher, and passengers were subjected to a harsher ride.

Innovative weight distribution in the new Chrysler Airflow stemmed from the need for superior handling dynamics. The engine was moved forward over the front wheels compared with traditional automobiles of the time, and passengers were all moved forward so that rear seat passengers were seated within the wheelbase, rather than on top of the rear axle. The weight distribution had approximately 54% of the weight over the front wheels, which evened to near 50:50 with passengers and resulted in more equal spring rates, better handling, and far superior ride quality.

Chrysler did not build another unibody vehicle until 1960 with the Virgil Exner Forward Look.

=== Debut ===
Prior to the Airflow's debut, Chrysler did a publicity stunt in which they reversed the chassis, placing the front axle and steering gear of a conventional 1933 Chrysler Six at the back of the car, which allowed the car to be driven "backwards" throughout Detroit. The stunt caused a near panic, but the marketing department felt that this would call attention to the poor aerodynamics of current cars, and send a hint that Chrysler was planning something big. The car that emerged was like no other American production car to date.

The Airflow, which was heavily influenced by the streamlining design movement, was sleek and low compared to other cars on American roads. The car's grille work cascaded forward and downward forming a waterfall look where other makes featured fairly upright radiators. Headlights were semi-flush to areas immediate to the grille. The front fenders enclosed the running surface of the tire tread. The rear wheels were encased by fender skirts.

Instead of a flat panel of glass, the windshield comprised two sheets of glass that formed a raked "vee" both side to side, and top to bottom. All the windows were made of safety glass. Passengers were carried in a full steel body (at a time when automakers like General Motors, Ford and even Chrysler itself continued to use wood structural framing members in their car bodies) that rested between the wheels instead of upon them. The front seat was wider than in other cars and the rear seat was deeper. Overall, the car possessed a better power-to-weight ratio, and its structural integrity was stronger than other like models of the day.

The car was introduced in January 1934, months before it was put in production. Production peaked at only 6,212 in May 1934 — very late in the year and barely enough to give every dealer a single Chrysler Airflow. The factory had not accounted for significant manufacturing challenges and expense due to the unusual new Airflow design, which required an unprecedented number and variety of welding techniques. The early Airflows arriving at dealerships suffered from significant problems, mostly the result of faulty manufacturing. According to Fred Breer, son of Chrysler Engineer Carl Breer, the first 2,000 to 3,000 Airflows to leave the factory had major defects, including engines breaking loose from their mountings at 80 mph (130 km/h).

=== 1934 ===
For 1934, both Chrysler and its junior running mate, DeSoto, were scheduled to offer the Airflow. DeSoto was assigned to offer nothing but Airflows; Chrysler, however, hedged its bets and continued to offer a six-cylinder variant of its more mainstream 1933 model cars. The Airflow used a flathead I8 engine and was produced in both 2-door coupe and 4-door sedan variants. Pricing was simplified at US$1,345 ($32,370 in 2025 dollars) for a choice of two, two-door sedans or two, four door sedans labeled Coupe, Brougham, Sedan and Town Sedan.

Chrysler of Canada produced an Airflow Six, model CY, which was basically a DeSoto Airflow with a Chrysler grille, bumpers, instrument panel and emblems. A total of 445 were built. The Airflow Six was dropped at the end of 1934. The appearance was also used for commercial trucks as the Dodge Airflow.

The Chrysler line of eight-cylinder Airflows included model CU Airflow Eight (123.5 in (3,140 mm) wheelbase), model CV Airflow Imperial Eight (128 in (3,300 mm) wheelbase), model CX Airflow Custom Imperial (137.5 in (3,490 mm) wheelbase). At the very top was the model CW Airflow Custom Imperial with a body built by LeBaron on a 146.5 in (3,720 mm) wheelbase. The CW had the industry's first one-piece curved windshield on a production automobile.

Within six months of the Airflow's introduction, the vehicle was a sales disaster. Adding insult to injury, General Motors mounted an advertising campaign aimed at further discrediting the Airflows. Most automotive historians, though, agree that the Airflow was shunned in large part because buyers did not like its looks. The hood, waterfall grille, headlamps, and fenders were all merged into one continuous form that was interpreted as an "anonymous lump". While thoroughly modern, the public was slow to embrace the Airflow. At the depth of the Great Depression, the car seemed to be too advanced, too different for many consumers. While Airflows sold in respectable numbers in its first year, Chrysler's traditional sedans and coupes far outsold the Airflow by 2.5 to one, with first year Airflow sales at 10,839 units.

DeSoto fared far worse than Chrysler for 1934. Without any "standard" car to sell, DeSoto's sales numbers plunged. And while the Airflow design looked somewhat sleek on the Chrysler's longer wheelbase, the DeSoto appeared to be short and stubby.

Rumors also persisted that the "new-fangled" body was unsafe, which was mostly untrue. In one widely distributed advertising film shown in movie theatres, an empty Airflow was pushed off a Pennsylvania cliff, falling over 110 ft (34 m); once righted, the car was driven off, battered, but recognizable.

=== 1935 ===
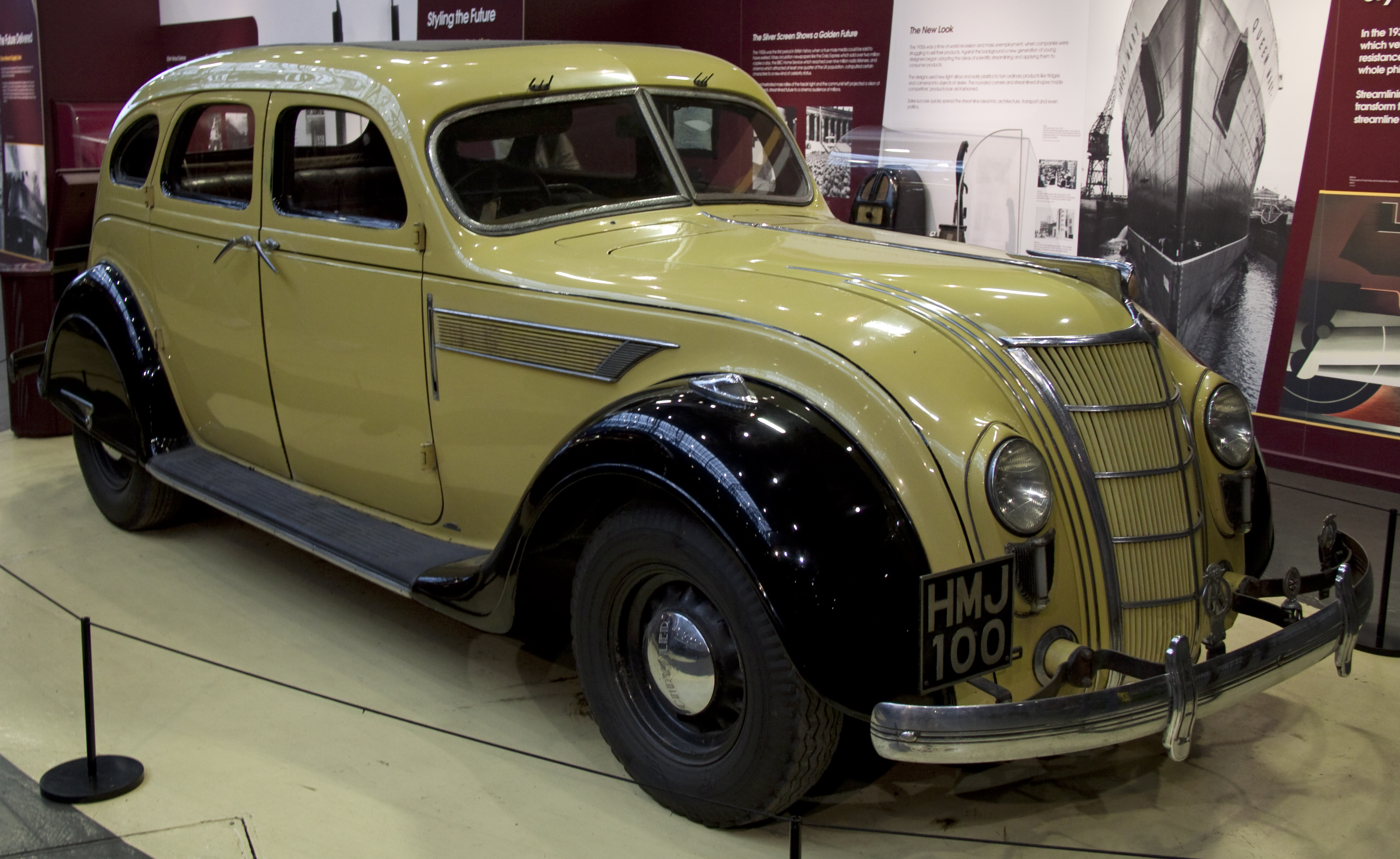
1935 Chrysler Airflow

Stung by the lack of consumer interest in the car, Chrysler responded by making modifications to the body that brought the front of the car more in line with public taste. Foremost of 1935 changes was the placement of a slightly peaked grille that replaced the waterfall unit of 1934.

The Airflow models offered for 1935 were the same as in 1934, with the exception of the Airflow Eight two-door sedan, which was dropped. Chrysler Airflow production dipped below 8,000 units for 1935, with roughly four Airstreams produced for every Airflow.

=== 1936 ===
For 1936, the Airflow surrendered its smooth backside when a trunk was tacked onto the body of the car. The grille also became more pronounced. Only one Airflow body style, the four-door Imperial sedan (C-10) broke the 1,000 unit mark with 4,259 units built. Otherwise, total Airflow production sank to 6,275 units compared to the concurrent Airstream models, which sold more than 52,000 units for 1936. 1936 would be the last year that Chrysler's premium Imperial model range would carry the Airflow. Lifeguard tires were introduced, which had two tubes inside the tire. In 1936 the Lincoln-Zephyr was introduced as a two- or four door sedan and while it was also a streamlined product, it sold much better than the Airflow and had a V-12 engine.

=== 1937 ===
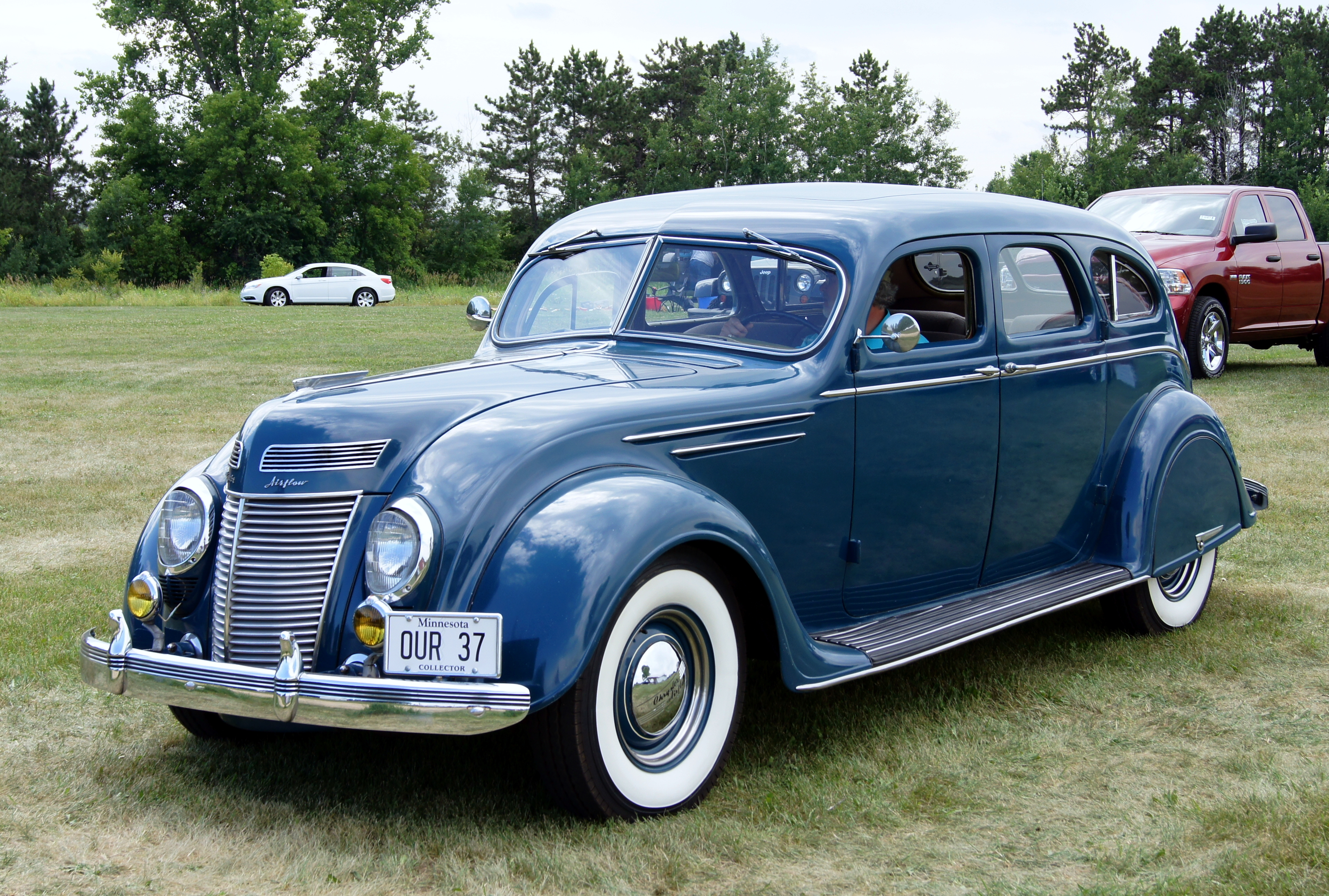
1937 Chrysler Airflow sedan

In its final year, the Airflow was reduced to one model, the Airflow Eight, offered as a two-door coupe and four-door sedan. A total of 4,600 were produced before the program was cancelled.

It was in this year that an Imperial Custom Airflow Series CW limousine became the official car of Philippine president Manuel L. Quezon. The historic vehicle was restored in 1978 and is on display in Quezon City, Philippines Another major restoration was conducted in 2009 by Alfred Nobel Perez of the Vintage Car Club of the Philippines in time for the 131st birth anniversary of Quezon. It was first displayed at Doña Aurora Quezon replica house corner of San Luis and Rizal Streets, Poblacion, Baler, Aurora, Philippines. It later became part of the National Historical Commission of the Philippines collection for its Presidential Car Museum inaugurated on August 19, 2018 in partnership with the Quezon City government.

Another 1937 Imperial Custom Airflow Series CW limousine was owned by radio personality Major Edward Bowes, Chrysler was one of Bowes' radio show sponsors. The two Airflow Custom Imperials were actually leftover 1935 models and only the two were built for 1937; Imperials and Custom Imperials built for the U.S. market in 1937 were conventionally styled, and priced below and above the Airflow, respectively. The cars have a 140 inches (3,600 mm) wheelbase.

=== Impact ===
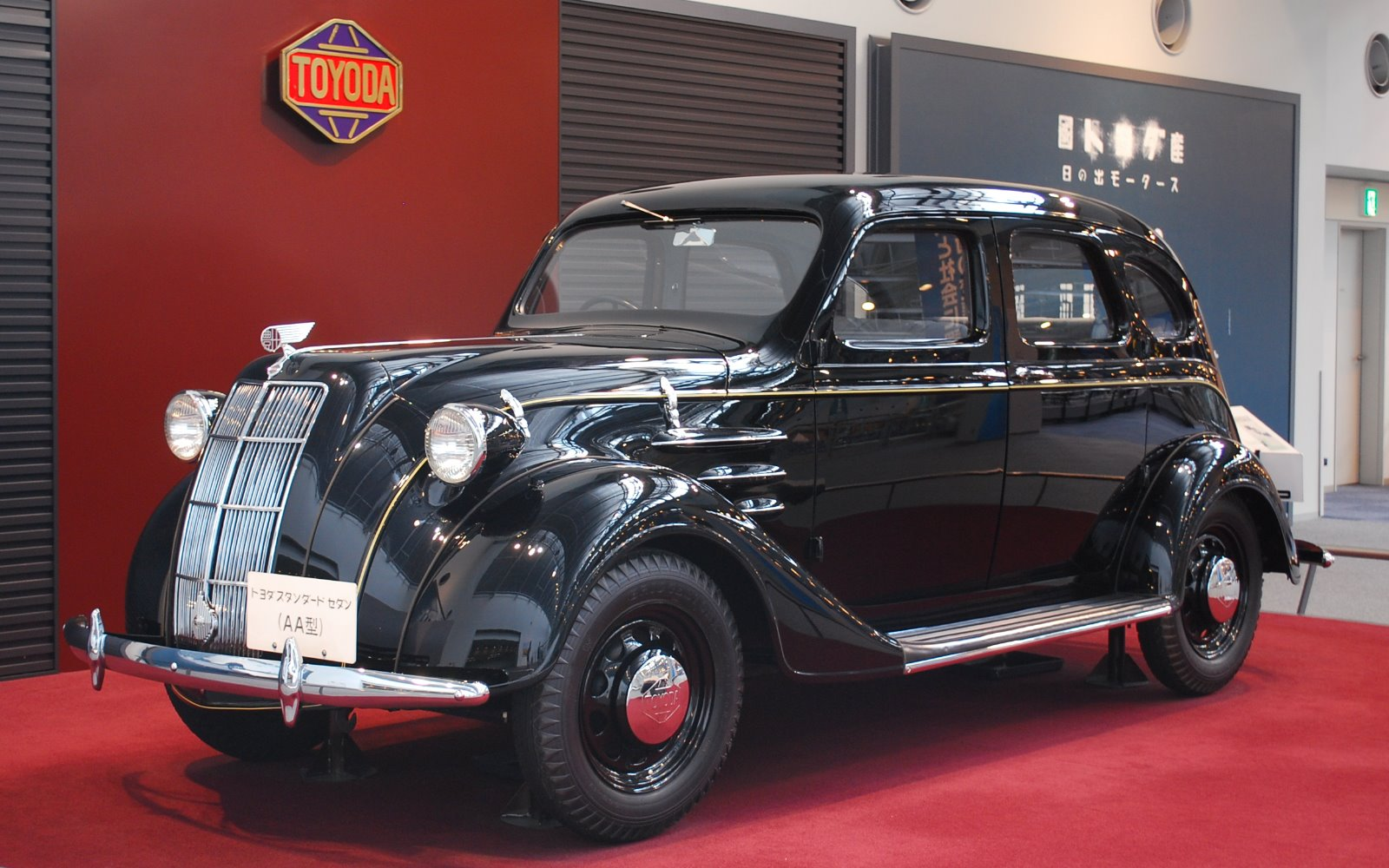
The 1936 Toyota AA was influenced by the Chrysler Airflow via the DeSoto Airflow.

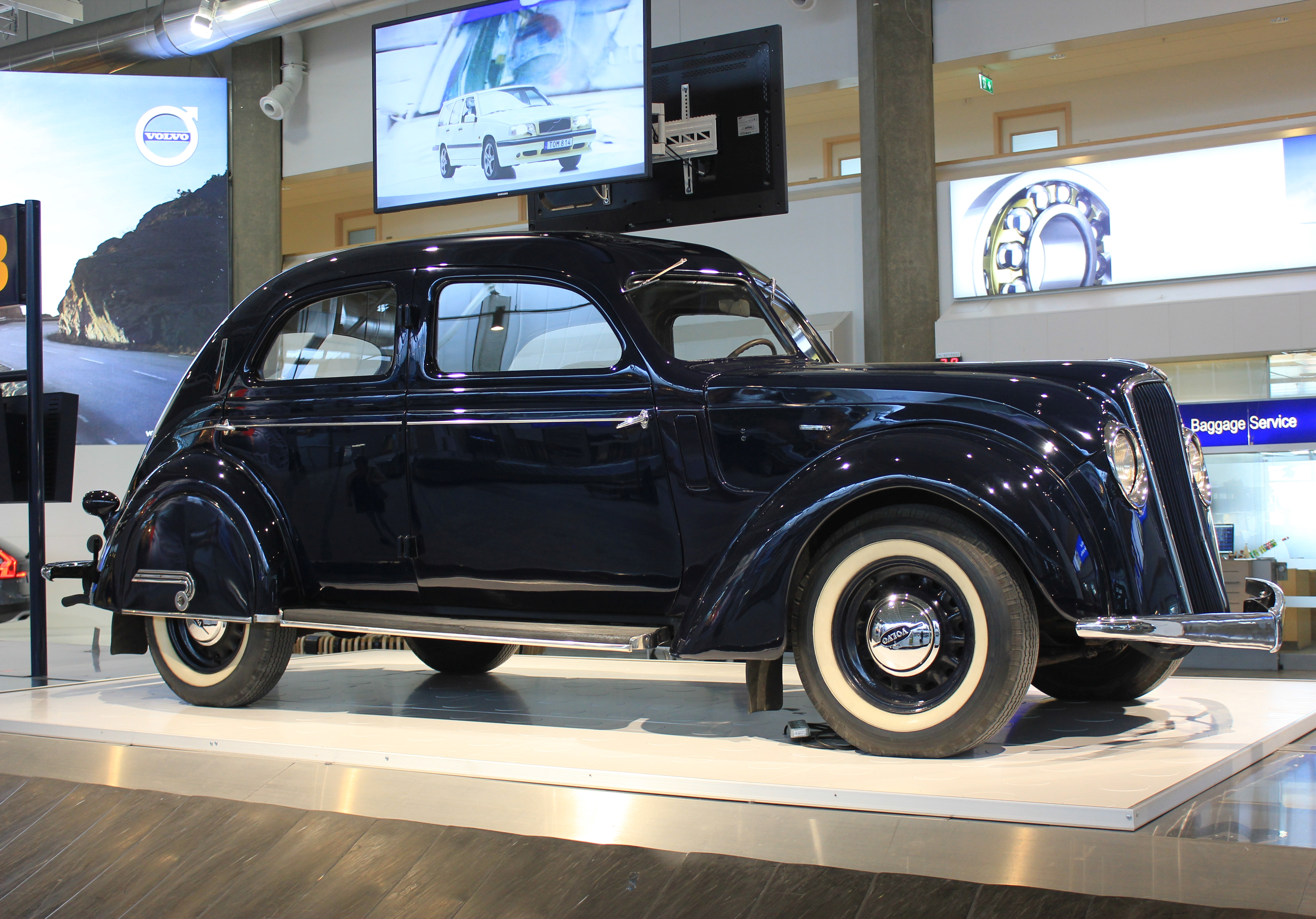
Volvo PV 36 Carioca

The Airflow's poor sales made Chrysler wary of pushing its styling too far. During the car's four-year run, the company repeatedly toned down the distinctive grille and front end to make it more appealing to buyers. After the Airflow was discontinued, Chrysler returned to more conventional designs, even as other manufacturers gradually adopted some of its aerodynamic ideas.

In a 1977 history of the Airflow, Howard S. Irwin wrote that Ferdinand Porsche was impressed by the engineering principles of the Airflow. He began work on a smaller design incorporating a rear-engine layout that Airflow designer Carl Breer had considered but abandoned. Irwin cited the Volkswagen Beetle as evidence of the Airflow's influence on automobile design.

Regardless, the revolutionary benefits of the design were immediately evident to designers the world over. U.S. designers could not and did not ignore the benefits of all-steel construction, aerodynamics and a rear seat forward of the rear axle. General Motors was quick to respond with all-steel "Turret Tops", and later introduced a fastback coupe appearance on all of their nameplates from 1942 until 1950, offering the appearance on the Chevrolet Fleetline, Pontiac Streamliner, Oldsmobile 88 Club Coupe, Buick Super Sedanette and Cadillac Series 61 Sedanette; other manufacturers either followed suit or went out of business.

In other countries, where gasoline was more expensive and practical considerations were therefore more important than styling, the flattery-by-imitation was even more sincere. Volvo was one of the first to get a smaller copy of the Airflow into production and was later followed by Peugeot with their 202 and larger 402 models, which would become a major sales success. The design of the Chrysler/DeSoto airflow would heavily influence Toyota in the manufacture of their first prototype and car, the Toyota AA.

After nearly a century, Chrysler created the Chrysler PT Cruiser which was a retro-style car with its styling having mixed elements from the 1949 Chevrolet Advance Design and the Chrysler Airflow.

The Airflow was the inspiration for Claes Oldenburg's print/sculpture Profile Airflow, featuring a lithograph of the car beneath a superimposed aquamarine resin relief. The initial resin in the initial printing faded to an olive green color and was thus recalled by Claes Oldenburg and Gemini G.E.L., the printmaking studio which fabricated Profile Airflow.

Profile Airflow is especially significant because it revolutionized the idea of a print, expanding it to include serialized sculpture.

== See also ==
- Streamliner: Automobiles for overview of early aerodynamic automobiles

Early aerodynamic cars, chronologically

- Rumpler Tropfenwagen (1921), first aerodynamic "teardrop" car to be designed and serially produced (about 100 units built)
- Persu car (1922–23), designed by Romanian engineer Aurel Persu, improved on the Tropfenwagen by placing the wheels inside the car body
- Burney car (1929–1931), working prototypes designed by Dennis Burney and manufactured by Streamline Cars
- Stout Scarab (1932–35, 1946), "teardrop" US car
- Dymaxion car, 1933 US "teardrop" car
- Pierce Silver Arrow (1933)
- Dodge Airflow truck (1934), special request model truck that used styling cues from Chrysler Airflow and Divco 1937 vans
- Tatra 77 (1934), claimed to be the first truly serial-produced aerodynamically-designed automobile
- Lincoln-Zephyr (1936–1942)
