= Gene Fondren =

American politician (1927–2010)

Member of the Texas House of Representatives from district 38-F
- In office January 10, 1967 – January 14, 1969
- Preceded by: District created
- Succeeded by: District abolished

Member of the Texas House of Representatives from the 54th district
- In office January 8, 1963 – January 10, 1967
- Preceded by: Ronald E. Roberts
- Succeeded by: J.E. Ward

Personal details
- Born: April 7, 1927 Corpus Christi, Texas
- Died: October 12, 2010 (aged 83) Austin, Texas
- Party: Democratic

Gene Fondren (April 7, 1927 – October 12, 2010) was an American politician who served in the Texas House of Representatives from 1963 to 1969.

== Career ==
Fondren ran the Texas Automobile Dealers Association for thirty years. He was given the Distinguished Service Citation Award by the Automotive Hall of Fame in 1993.

== Death ==
He died on October 12, 2010, in Austin, Texas at age 83.
