= Floating Power =

Form of vibration reduction in four-cylinder engines

Floating Power was a technology developed in the 1920s by the United States automobile firm Chrysler. It is credited mostly to the engineering of Owen Ray Skelton. It was a new means of attaching an engine to its chassis, with the intention of reducing vibration. Four-cylinder engines of the day transmitted torque to the entire chassis, producing considerable vibration. Attaching the engine at only two points ("fore-and-aft"), defining an axis that passes through the engine's center of mass, allowed the engine to rotate slightly about this axis and reduce the transmission of torsional vibration to the chassis. One mounting attachment was at the upper front of the engine, directly below the water pump. The rear mount was under the transmission case. A transverse spring went from the bottom of the engine to a snubber bracket on the frame rail to limit the engine's rotational travel. The bracket was lined with rubber.

Advertisers gave this concept a meaningful name. It was used on the Plymouth and other Chrysler Corporation cars starting in the 1930s. The French firm Citroën leased the technology for its front-wheel drive car of the 1930s.

== Sources ==
- Savell, Lawrence. "The "Floating Power" Lawsuit" (PDF).
- Curcio, Vincent (2001). Chrysler: The Life and Times of an Automotive Genius (illustrated ed.). Oxford University Press. ISBN 0195147057.
