= Lee Hunter (engineer) =

American engineer (1913–1986)

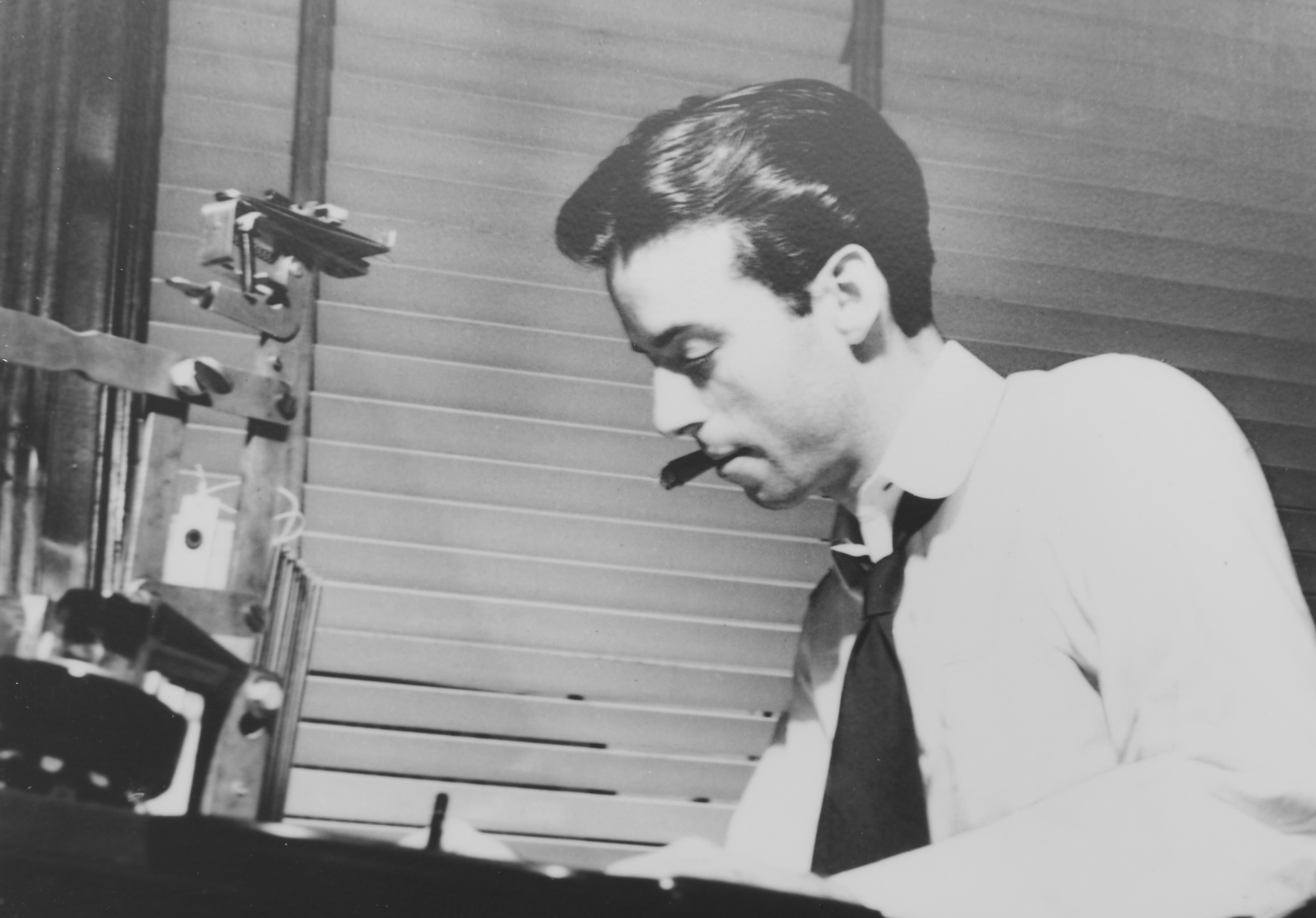
Lee Hunter at his desk

Lee Hunter Jr. (1913–1986) was an automotive engineer. His inventions include the "Kwikurent" device for the rapid charging of a car battery, and a machine to balance car wheels while they spin. He founded Hunter Engineering Company in 1946. For his "dramatic impact on the development of the automobile and the automotive industry" he was inducted posthumously into the Automotive Hall of Fame in Dearborn, Michigan, US.

== Kwikurent ==
Hunter was a 23-year-old St. Louis architecture student, found himself frequently confronted with car battery failure in his Packard convertible automobile. In 1936, it took several days to recharge a car battery. Hunter sought to find a better, faster way to recharge batteries. With the help of a former Washington University in St. Louis electrical engineering professor, Hunter began developing a new design. His quick charge battery recharger was based on a diverter pole generator. He put this new product on the market and during the Great Depression, the Lee Hunter, Jr., Manufacturing Co. sold the $497 Kwikurent charger as fast as the company could make them.

== Hunter Engineering ==
After serving in both the United States Army Corps of Engineers and Ordnance Corps during World War II, Hunter returned to St. Louis in 1946 and reopened his business under the name of Hunter Engineering Company. Lee Hunter also laid the foundation for a global distribution base for Hunter products. In 1955 Hunter developed a new wheel alignment system called 'Lite-A-Line', which became the industry standard. In 1962, Hunter's 'Tune-Align' became the first mechanical alignment system capable of compensating for wheel run-out, a major factor affecting wheel alignment precision. Hunter Engineering continued to expand its export markets and in 1964 was named by the U.S. Department of Commerce as a winner of the E-Award for excellence in the development of export trade.

== Automotive Hall of Fame ==
Nearly 50 years after Lee Hunter founded Hunter Engineering Company, he was inducted into the Automotive Hall of Fame in Dearborn, Michigan. In this shrine of automotive history, Lee Hunter shares the spotlight with automotive industry giants like Henry Ford, Louis Chevrolet, Walter P. Chrysler and Soichiro Honda. The Hall of Fame places Hunter among “individuals who have made a dramatic impact on the development of the automobile and the automotive industry”. He is buried at Bellefontaine Cemetery in St. Louis.
