= Zenon C.R. Hansen =

American businessman (1909–1990)

Zenon Clayton Raymond Hansen (July 23, 1909 – October 19, 1990) was chairman and CEO of Mack Trucks, Inc. from 1965 to 1974. He was the fifth president of the company. Zenon C.R. Hansen was active in the Boy Scouts of America and he was an Eagle Scout. Zenon C.R. Hansen was elected to the Automotive Hall of Fame in 1983.

Hansen died in 1990. The Zenon C.R. Hansen Foundation helped to start a leadership program at Doane College in Crete, Nebraska.

The Hansen Leadership Program is designed to develop the leadership skills of Doane College students, area high school students, and community residents.

== Early years ==
Zenon Clayton Raymond Hansen was born July 23, 1909, in Hibbing, Minnesota. His parents were Nelson Christian Martin Hansen, a Protestant tailor and son of Swedish immigrants, and Ivah Delle Raymond Hansen, a Catholic housewife of French and Irish descent. His parents divorced when Hansen was four.

=== Recollections ===
"I started at Mack Trucks in June 20, 1969. I started at 5C plant on the heavy Line. My twin was just above me mounting bogies (rear axles). It got to the point they had to place me on the Lite Line because my twin brother worked up from me on the same line & the bosses were giving orders to the wrong man in their area.They had to put me on the MB utility work on the Lite Line. Mr. Hansen was the best CEO that I ever worked under. The reason I say this, he was a fair man to his employees & a kind gentleman to ALL HIS EMPLOYEES. He did a lot for all the people in the Lehigh Valley & Allentown Pa.I put 32 years at Mack Trucks, from 1969-1974 were the best years of my life, thanks to Mr. Hansen. A Proud Mack Man" - Clinton L. Trumbauer

== Later life ==
Zenon died of cancer on October 19, 1990, at the age of 81. His obituary was featured in the New York Times and other papers across the country.

== In popular culture ==
Hansen was featured in the 2014 biography Legacy of Leadership: Zenon C.R. Hansen-The Untold Story of a Dedicated Boy Scout's Rise to Captain of Industry by Steve J. Myers.
