= Edward Davis (car dealer) =

- Born: February 27, 1911; Shreveport, Louisiana, U.S.
- Died: May 3, 1999 (aged 88); Detroit, Michigan, U.S.
- Occupation: Car dealer
- Known for: First African American inductee to the Automotive Hall of Fame, headed Detroit mass transit system

Edward Davis (February 27, 1911 – May 3, 1999) was an American car dealer.

== Biography ==
=== Early life ===
Davis was born in Shreveport, Louisiana in 1911 and his family moved to the Detroit area in 1921. He graduated from Cass Technical High School.

=== Career ===
After graduating from Cass Tech, Davis opened a car wash but would eventually find success in sales at a local Dodge dealership. In 1938, he opened a used car lot and two years later became a Studebaker dealer. Studebaker Corporation faced financial difficulties in the 1950s which led to Davis closing his dealership in 1956. In 1963, he opened a Chrysler-Plymouth dealership which he ran until 1971.

Following his retirement from the car business, Davis accepted an appointment as general manager of the Detroit mass transit system from mayor Roman Gribbs. During this time he also wrote his autobiography, One Man's Way, which was published in 1979.

In 1996, Davis became the first black inductee in the Automotive Hall of Fame.
