= Betsy Ancker-Johnson =

American physicist (1927–2020)

- Born: April 29, 1927; St. Louis, Missouri
- Died: July 2, 2020 (aged 93); Austin, Texas
- Education: Wellesley College and University of Tübingen
- Spouse: Harold Johnson
- Children: Ruth, David, Paul, Marti,
- Scientific career
- Fields: Plasma physics, engineering

Betsy Ancker-Johnson (April 29, 1927 – July 2, 2020) was an American plasma physicist. She was known for her research into instabilities that can occur in plasmas in solids, and for her invention of a gigacycle range signal generator using semiconductor materials in magnetic and electric fields. She was the first woman Presidential appointee in the U.S. Department of Commerce. She is the fourth woman elected to the National Academy of Engineering.

== Early life and education ==
Ancker-Johnson was born Betsy Ancker in St. Louis, Missouri on April 29, 1927. Her parents, Clinton James and Fern (Lalan) Ancker, encouraged her to follow her interests.

She earned a Bachelor's degree with high honors in physics from Wellesley College in 1949, and was a part of Phi Beta Kappa. She earned her PhD from University of Tübingen, Germany, graduating magnum cum laude in 1953.

Her honorary degrees include doctorates of science from the New York Polytechnic Institute and the University of Southern California, and a doctorate in law at Bates College.

== Career ==
After graduate school, Ancker-Johnson was a junior research physicist and lecturer at UC Berkeley before working at Sylvania Electric Products and the David Sarnoff Research Center at the Radio Corporation of America. She was an affiliate professor of electrical engineering at the University of Washington from 1961 to 1973. During that time, she was also a research specialist at the plasma physics lab of Boeing Science Research Laboratories, where she rose to supervisor and manager of solid state and plasma electronics and advanced energy systems, respectively. Ancker-Johnson was also a visiting scientist at Bell Labs during this period.

In 1973 Ancker-Johnson became the assistant secretary for science and technology, the first woman appointed by the president to the U.S. Department of Commerce. After that appointment, Ancker-Johnson became the associate laboratory director of physics research at Argonne National Laboratory before she became the first woman vice-president in the automotive industry as the vice-president of General Motors' environmental activities staff. While working there, Ancker-Johnson was a lecturer in the department of electrical engineering and computer science at UC Berkeley.

Ancker-Johnson published over 70 scientific papers and patents.

== Personal life ==
Betsy Ancker-Johnson married Hal Johnson and had four children: Ruth, David, Paul, and Martha.

== Honors and awards ==
- Fellow, National Academy of Engineering (1975)
- Fellow, American Physical Society
- Fellow, Institute of Electrical and Electronics Engineers
- Member, Society of Automotive Engineers
- Inducted into the Automotive Hall of Fame in 2024

Ancker-Johnson is featured in the Notable Women in Computing cards.
