= Harry H. Bassett =

American automotive industry executive (1874-1926)

- Born: Henry Hoxie Bassett; September 11, 1874; Utica, New York, U.S.
- Died: October 17, 1926 (aged 52); Paris, France
- Occupation: manager
- Known for: President Buick Motor Car Company
- Board member of: General Motors
- Spouses: Maria Pearl Cole; Jessie Hood
- Children: 2

Harry Hoxie Bassett (September 11, 1874 – October 17, 1926) was an American automotive industry executive and president of Buick Motor Car Company, division of General Motors from 1920 through 1926.

== Early life ==
Bassett was born in Utica, New York, the son of Mary (née Babcock) and William Bassett. Bassett had dreams of being a lawyer but without funds to attend law school, he started his manufacturing career directly out of high school working for the Remington Arms Company. He had to request a day off to be able to attend his high school graduation. He worked for Remington Arms for twelve years when Charles Stewart Mott requested that Bassett become the assistant general manager at Mott's operation in Flint. (Billy Durant had requested that Mott move his wheel and axle manufacturing company from Utica, New York to Flint, Michigan to be closer to the Buick Manufacturing operations in Flint). In 1905, Bassett agreed to join Mott and left his position with Remington Arms.

== Weston-Mott operations ==
After becoming abreast of Weston-Mott manufacturing operations in Utica, Bassett left for Flint and within one year was promoted to factory manager. The factory in Flint was new and was placed conveniently next to a new Buick manufacturing operation. By 1909, Durant traded General Motors stock for Weston-Mott stock and acquired 49% ownership of the Weston-Mott enterprise. The remaining 51% was purchased by General Motors in 1913 while the company was under the leadership of Charles W. Nash. Although purchased by General Motors, Weston-Mott was positioned within the Buick Car Company. In 1916, Bassett was elected vice-president of the Weston-Mott company and assistant general manager of Buick. That same year, Walter Chrysler then head of Buick Motor Car Company, threatened to leave General Motors as operations were back under control of Billy Durant. Durant offered Chrysler $500,000 annual salary plus bonus to remain with the company which Chrysler did for the next three years, finally resigning in 1919. The last straw for Chrysler was Durant's plan to invest $6M in the factory in Flint to manufacture frames when Chrysler had negotiated with A.O. Smith of Milwaukee to purchase frames cheaper than the Flint factory could produce them. Durant's promoting Bassett to general manager that year, was a bid to position a successor to Chrysler.

== Buick Motor Car Company ==
When Chrysler finally did resign, Bassett was promoted to the Chrysler's position and became president and general manager of Buick. Immediately after taking office, Bassett was charged with implementing the $6M investment in the factory in Flint to manufacture frames and an additional $3M to establish a new factory in St. Louis.

Bassett was very popular among the workers in his factories, many of whom referred to him as "Harry." Forbes wrote the following after interviewing Bassett: "I once had a similar experience on a tour through a Buick plant with Harry Bassett, then its president. He was "Harry" to hundreds of men; he was constantly on his feet going from department to department of the plant; the men approached him and he approached them as if there were not the slightest distinction in their status and, if he ran short of tobacco, he thought nothing of asking an overawed workman to give him a chew." Forbes went on, "I learned from other officials that all the men who had been with the company for any time felt that they were working, not for some monster corporation, but for Harry Bassett, and that it was up to them to do their best by him and for him."

== Death ==
Bassett travelled to Paris with a number of General Motors executives to attend the Paris Auto Show. While there, he contracted a cold which turned into bronchial pneumonia and on 17 October 1926, Bassett died. Bassett's body was returned to the United States and was brought by special train from Detroit to Flint on the 5th of November 1926. His body lay in state in Flint the next day. Buick factories were closed the 5th and 6 November, out of respect and to permit the workers to pay their respects. Bassett was replaced by Edward T. Strong who was appointed by Alfred Sloan, the man in charge of General Motors at that time.
