= Bushing (isolator) =

Type of vibration isolator

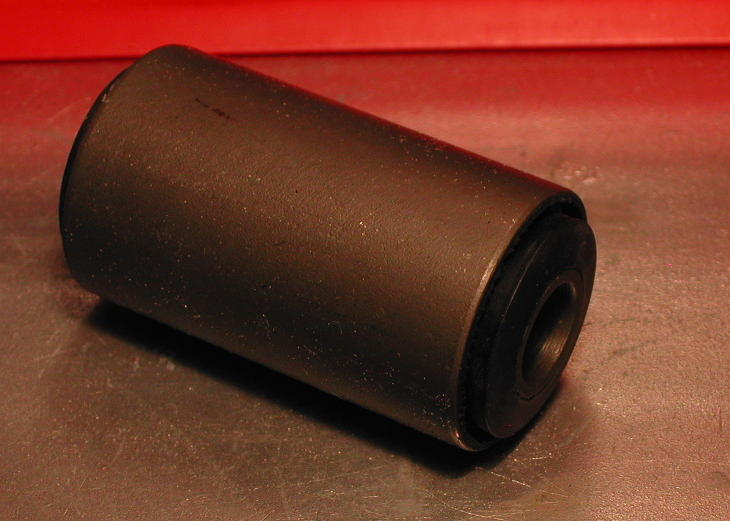
A bushing for a Fiat 500R

A bushing or rubber bushing is a type of vibration isolator. It provides an interface between two parts, damping the energy transmitted through the bushing. A common application is in vehicle suspension systems, where a bushing made of rubber (or, more often, synthetic rubber or polyurethane) separates the faces of two metal objects while allowing a certain amount of movement. This movement allows the suspension parts to move freely, for example, when traveling over a large bump, while minimizing transmission of noise and small vibrations through to the chassis of the vehicle. A rubber bushing may also be described as a flexible mounting or antivibration mounting.

These bushings often take the form of an annular cylinder of flexible material inside a metallic casing or outer tube. They might also feature an internal crush tube which protects the bushing from being crushed by the fixings which hold it onto a threaded spigot. Many different types of bushing designs exist. An important difference compared with plain bearings is that the relative motion between the two connected parts is accommodated by strain in the rubber, rather than by shear or friction at the interface. Some rubber bushings, such as the D block for a sway bar, do allow sliding at the interface between one part and the rubber.

== History ==
Charles E. Sorensen credits Walter Chrysler as being a leader in encouraging the adoption of rubber vibration-isolating mounts. In his memoir (1956), he says that, on March 10, 1932, Chrysler called at Ford headquarters to show off a new Plymouth model.

"The most radical feature of his car was the novel suspension of its six-cylinder engine so as to cut down vibration. The engine was supported on three points and rested on rubber mounts. Noise and vibration were much less. There was still a lot of movement of the engine when idling, but under a load it settled down. Although it was a great success in the Plymouth, Henry Ford did not like it. For no given reason, he just didn't like it, and that was that. I told Walter that I felt it was a step in the right direction, that it would smooth out all noises and would adapt itself to axles and springs and steering-gear mounts, which would stop the transfer of road noises into the body. Today rubber mounts are used on all cars. They are also found on electric-motor mounts, in refrigerators, radios, television sets—wherever mechanical noises are apparent, rubber is used to eliminate them. We can thank Walter Chrysler for a quieter way of life. Mr. Ford could have installed this new mount at once in the V-8, but he missed the value of it. Later Edsel and I persuaded him. Rubber mounts are now found also in doors, hinges, windshields, fenders, spring hangers, shackles, and lamps—all with the idea of eliminating squeaks and rattles."

Lee Iacocca credits Chrysler's chief of engineering during that era, Frederick Zeder, with leading the effort. Iacocca said that Zeder "was the first man to figure out how to get the vibrations out of cars. His solution? He mounted their engines on a rubber base."

== In Vehicles ==
A bushing is a type of bearing that is used in the suspension system of a vehicle. It is typically used to connect moving parts such as control arms and sway bars to the frame of the vehicle, and also to isolate these parts from each other and from the frame. The main function of a bushing is to reduce the transmission of vibrations and shocks from the road to the rest of the vehicle, which helps to improve the overall ride comfort and reduce noise and harshness inside the vehicle.

== See also ==
- Shock mount

== Bibliography ==
- Iacocca, Lido A. (1984), William Novak (ed.), Iacocca: An Autobiography, Bantam Books, ISBN 978-0553051025, LCCN 84045174.
- Sorensen, Charles E. (1956), My Forty Years with Ford, New York: W. W. Norton, LCCN 56010854, OCLC 912748. Various republications, including ISBN 9780814332795.
- DeSilva, C. W., "Vibration and Shock Handbook", CRC, 2005, ISBN 0-8493-1580-8
- Harris, C. M., and Peirsol, A. G. "Shock and Vibration Handbook", 2001, McGraw Hill, ISBN 0-07-137081-1
