= Automotive Hall of Fame =

Hall of fame and museum in Dearborn, Michigan, United States

Coordinates: 42°18′9″N 83°14′15.7″W

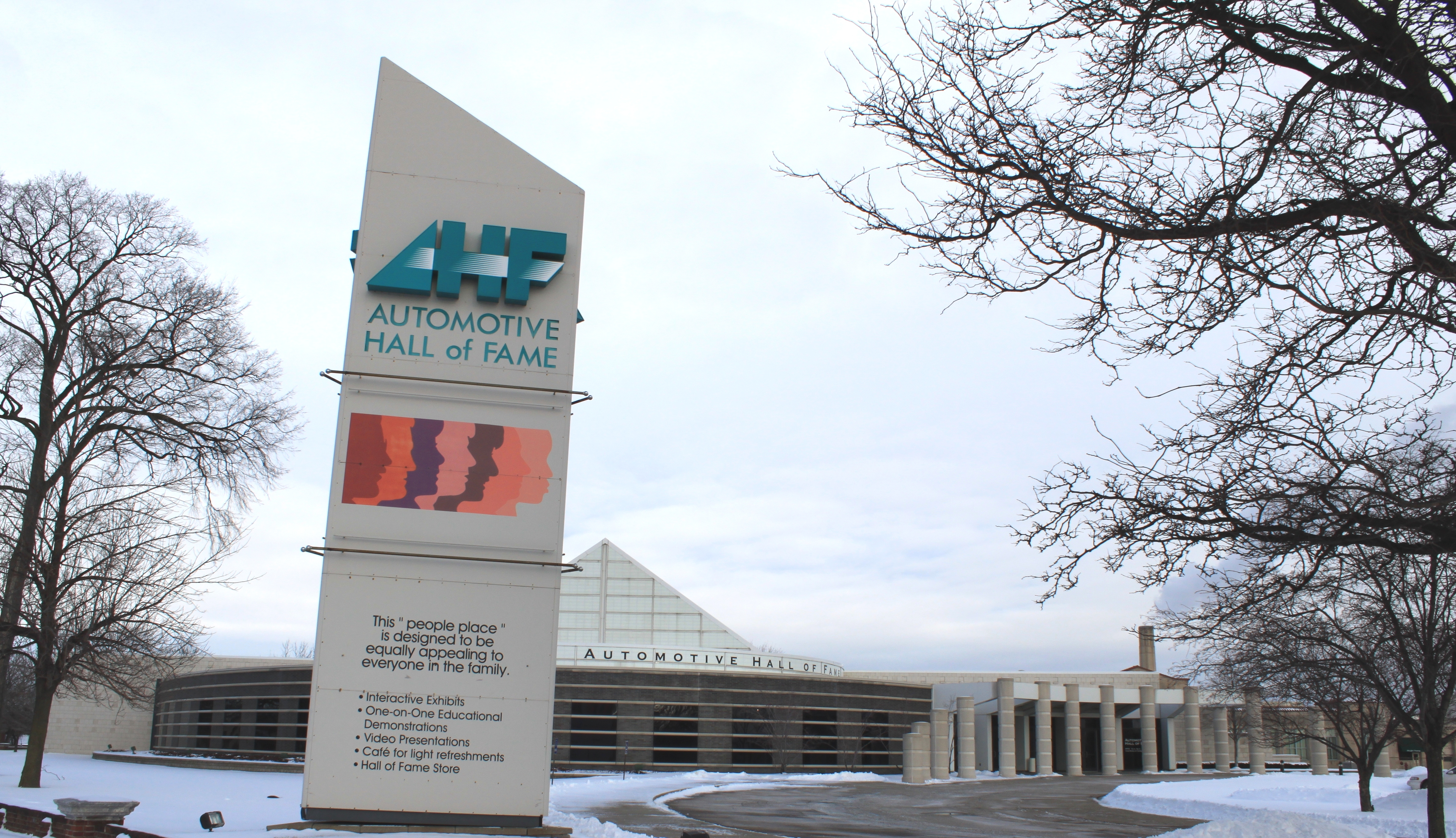
- Automotive Hall of Fame in 2011

- Location within Michigan
- Established: October 18, 1939
- Location: 21400 Oakwood Blvd; Dearborn, MI 48126
- Website: www.automotivehalloffame.org

The Automotive Hall of Fame is a museum and hall of fame honoring influential figures in the history of the automotive industry. Located in Dearborn, Michigan, a suburb of Detroit, US. The Hall of Fame is part of the MotorCities National Heritage Area.

== History ==
The Automotive Hall of Fame was founded on October 18, 1939, in New York City by a group called the "Automobile Old Timers." Its original mission was to perpetuate the memories of early automotive pioneers and to honor people from all parts of the auto industry worldwide. For its first three decades, The Automotive Hall of Fame had four name changes. Its second iteration, "Automotive Old Timers," was adopted in 1957 to recognize a broader base, including automotive-related industries. In 1971, it became "The Automotive Organization Team." Finally, it became known as "The Automotive Hall of Fame," a name that led to further growth.

In 1946, the Hall participated in the "National Golden Jubilee" to celebrate the 50th anniversary of the automobile's invention and honor the industry's creators. The Jubilee committee president, William S. Knudsen, stated the selection to the Hall of Fame included "Ten pioneers whose engineering and administrative genius made possible the present day." The selection was done in cooperation with the Automobile Manufacturers Association. The ten were: Edgar Apperson, William Crapo Durant, J. Frank Duryea, Henry Ford, George M. Holley, Charles B. King, Charles W. Nash, Barney Oldfield, Ransom E. Olds, and Alfred P. Sloan Jr. were selected. The managing director of the Jubilee was George W. Romney. The events also initiated interest in older cars.

The organization moved to Washington, D.C. in 1960, sharing space in the National Automobile Dealers Association building. In 1971, it moved to Midland, Michigan, where it got its first home at Northwood University. In 1997, it moved to its present home, a 25,000-square-foot building in Dearborn, Michigan, adjacent to The Henry Ford; in addition to automobile history artifacts, it contains a small theater and a central enclosed building area for public events, meetings and other exhibits.

The Hall celebrated its 75th anniversary in 2014.

During the 2016 induction ceremony, the Hall of Fame's president announced that the museum was exploring a possible move to downtown Detroit. These plans never materialized.

== Awards ==
The Hall honors members of the automotive industry each year. There were 271 people inducted into the Automotive Hall of Fame through 2016. These inductees include the founders of Benz, Bosch, Bugatti, Buick, Chevrolet, Chrysler, Citroen, Cord, Daimler, Dodge, Duesenberg, Durant, Duryea, Ferrari, Ford, Honda, Maybach, Olds, Peugeot, Porsche, Renault, and Toyota, among others.

Along with the Hall of Fame induction awards, the Hall also honors individuals with three other significant awards each year:

- Distinguished Service Citation
- Industry Leader of the Year Award
- Young Leader and Excellence Award

For the Hall induction, the Distinguished Service Citation, and the Young Leader and Excellence Award, anyone can submit a nomination by filling out the form or sending a letter, along with reference materials that may assist the Awards Committee. The Industry Leader of the Year Award is nominated and awarded solely by the Awards Committee, so no external nominations are accepted.

=== Inductees ===
- (Italy) Giovanni Agnelli (2002)
- (United States) O. Donovan Allen (1974)
- (United States) John W. Anderson (1972)
- (United States) Betsy Ancker-Johnson (2024)
- (Italy) (United States) Mario Andretti (2005)
- (Russia) (United States) Zora Arkus-Duntov (1991)
- (United States) Clarence W. Avery (1990)
- (United States) Warren E. Avis (2000)
- (United Kingdom) Robert Bamford (2013)
- (Hungary) (Austria) Béla Barényi (1994)
- (United States) Mary Barra (2023)
- (United States) Tom Barrett (2026)
- (United States) Fred T. Bauer (2023)
- (United States) Vincent Bendix (1984)
- (United Kingdom) Walter O. Bentley (1995)
- (Germany) Bertha Benz (2016)
- (Germany) Karl Benz (1984)
- (Italy) Nuccio Bertone (2006)
- (Sweden) Nils Bohlin (1999)
- (Italy) Alberto Bombassei (2017)
- (Germany) Robert Bosch (1984)
- (United States) Charles A. Bott (1990)
- (United States) Ernest R. Breech (1974)
- (United States) Allen K. Breed (1999)
- (United States) Craig Breedlove (2009)
- (United States) Carl Breer (1976)
- (United States) Edward G. Budd (1985)
- (United States) Gordon M. Buehrig (1989)
- (Italy) (France) Ettore Bugatti (2000)
- (United Kingdom) (United States) David D. Buick (1974)
- (United States) Philip Caldwell (1990)
- (United States) Richard D. Caleal (2009)
- (United States) Frank J. Campbell (1996)
- (United States) Michael Cardone Sr. (1994)
- (United States) Walter F. Carey (1981)
- (France) (United States) Francois J. Castaing (2010)
- (France) Albert C. Champion (1977)
- (United States) Roy D. Chapin (1972) His son Roy D. Chapin Jr. was inducted into the Automotive Hall of Fame in 1984 and his grandson, William R. Chapin, was named president of the Automotive Hall of Fame in 2010.
- (Switzerland) (United States) Louis Chevrolet (1969)
- (United States) Walter P. Chrysler (1967)
- (South Korea) Chung Mong-koo (2020/2021)
- (France) André Citroën(1998)
- (United States) J. Harwood Cochrane (1991)
- (United States) Edward N. Cole (1977)
- (United States) David E. Cole (2013)
- (United States) Archie T. Colwell (1988)
- (United States) Errett L. Cord (1976)
- (United States) James J. Couzens (2012)
- (United States) Keith E. Crain (2014)
- (United States) Frederick C. Crawford (1983)
- (United States) Lewis M. Crosley (2010)
- (United States) Powel Crosley Jr. (2010)
- (United States) Clessie L. Cummins (1973)
- (United States) Harlow H. Curtice (1971)
- (Germany) Gottlieb Daimler (1978)
- (Italy) Giampaolo Dallara (2026)
- (United States) Charles A. Dana (1978)
- (United States) Howard A. "Dutch" Darrin (2010)
- (United States) Richard E. “Dick” Dauch (2019)
- (United States) Edward "Ed" Davis (1996)
- (Italy) (United States) Ralph DePalma (1973)
- (United States) Joseph Degnan (1997)
- (United States) W. Edwards Deming (1991)
- (Germany) Rudolf Diesel (1978)
- (United States) Arthur O. Dietz (1983)
- (United States) Abner Doble (1972)
- (United States) Horace E. Dodge (1981)
- (United States) John F. Dodge (1997)
- (United States) Frederic G. Donner (1994)
- (United States) Harold D. Draper (1991)
- (Germany) (United States) Fred Duesenberg (1970)
- (United Kingdom) John B. Dunlop (2005)
- (United States) William C. Durant (1968)
- (United States) Charles E. Duryea (1973)
- (United States) J. Frank Duryea (1996)
- (United States) David E. Davis (2025)
- (United States) Harley J. Earl (1986)
- (United States) Dale Earnhardt (2006)
- (United States) Joseph O. Eaton (1983)
- (United States) John E. "Jack" Echlin
- (United States) Vic Edelbrock Jr. (2024)
- (United States) Vic Edelbrock Sr. (2024)
- (United States) Thomas A. Edison (1969)
- (United States) Elliott M. Estes (1999)
- (United States) Henry T. Ewald (1996)
- (United States) Virgil M. Exner (1995)
- (Argentina) Juan Manuel Fangio (2023)
- (Italy) Battista Pininfarina (2004)
- (Italy) Enzo Ferrari (2000)
- (United States) Harvey S. Firestone Jr. (1975)
- (United States) Harvey S. Firestone Sr. (1974)
- (United States) Alfred J. Fisher (1995)
- (United States) Carl G. Fisher (1971)
- (United States) Charles T. Fisher (1995)
- (United States) Edward F. Fisher (1995)
- (United States) Fred J. Fisher (1995)
- (United States) Howard A. Fisher (1995)
- (United States) Lawrence P. Fisher (1995)
- (United States) William A. Fisher (1995)
- (United States) Walter E. Flanders (1994)
- (United States) Edsel B. Ford (1968)
- (United States) Henry Ford (1967)
- (United States) Henry Ford II (1983)
- (United States) William Clay Ford Jr. (2024)
- (United States) A.J. Foyt (2007)
- (United States) Bill France Sr. (2004)
- (United States) Bill France Jr. (2006)
- (United States) Herbert H. Franklin (1972)
- (United States) Carlyle Fraser (1981)
- (United States) Douglas A. Fraser (2000)
- (United States) Joseph W. Frazer (2010)
- (Germany) (United States) Martin Fromm (1993)
- (United States) Thomas N. Frost (1970)
- (United States) August Fruehauf (2017)
- (Japan) Takeo Fujisawa (2023)
- (United States) Thomas C. Gale (2012)
- (United States) Tom Gallagher (2020/2021)
- (United States) Paul Galvin (2008)
- (United States) Robert W. Galvin (2008)
- (United States) Don Garlits (2004)
- (United States) Pieter Geelen (2026)
- (United States) Joe Girard (2001)
- (Italy) Giorgetto Giugiaro (2002)
- (Netherlands) Harold Goddijn (2026)
- (United States) John E. Goerlich (1990)
- (United States) Martin E. Goldman (1981)
- (United States) Andy Granatelli (2003)
- (United States) Richard H. Grant (1971)
- (United States) Alma Green (2022)
- (United States) Victor Green (2022)
- (United States) Dan Gurney (2007)
- (United States) Janet Guthrie (2019)
- (United States) Zenon C.R. Hansen (1983)
- (United States) Elwood Haynes (2015)
- (United States) Donald Healey (2004)
- (United States) Phil Hill (2008)
- (Austria) (United States) Maximilian E. Hoffman (2003)
- (United States) William E. Holler (1969)
- (United States) Earl Holley (1995)
- (United States) George M. Holley (1995)
- (Japan) Soichiro Honda (1989)
- (Germany) August Horch (2000)
- (United States) H. Wayne Huizenga (2006)
- (United States) Anton Hulman Jr. (1978)
- (United States) Lee Hunter (1992)
- (United States) J.R. Hyde III (2004)
- (United States) Lee Iacocca (1994)
- (United States) Robert W. Irvin (2008)
- (Japan) Shojiro Ishibashi (2006)
- (United Kingdom) Alec Issigonis (2003)
- (United States) Mike Jackson (2018)
- (United States) Russ Jackson (2026)
- (United States) John A. James (2024)
- (United States) Thomas B. Jeffery (1975)
- (United States) Fred Jones (1994)
- (United States) Charles M."Chuck" Jordan (2012)
- (United States) Edward S. "Ned" Jordan (2010)
- (United States) Henry B. Joy (2003)
- (United States) Albert Kahn (2012)
- (United States) Henry J. Kaiser (2010)
- (United States) Wunibald I. Kamm (2009)
- (Japan) Yutaka Katayama (1998)
- (United States) K.T. Keller (1971)
- (United States) Frank D. Kent (1989)
- (United States) Charles F. Kettering (1967)
- (United States) Charles B. King (2007)
- (Denmark) (United States) William S. Knudsen (1968)
- (United States) John W. Koons (1988)
- (Germany) Eberhard von Kuenheim (2004)
- (Italy) Ferruccio Lamborghini (2022)
- (United States) Edward C. Larson (1984)
- (United States) Elliot Lehman (1993)
- (United States) Henry M. Leland (1973)
- (United States) Jay Leno (2020/2021)
- (United States) Paul W. Litchfield (1984)
- (France) (United States) Raymond Loewy (1997)
- (United States) Wilton D. Looney (1992)
- (China) Lu Guanqiu (2022)
- (United States) J. Edward Lundy (2003)
- (United States) Roy Lunn (2016)
- (Switzerland) (United States) Robert A. Lutz (2013)
- (United Kingdom) Sir William Lyons (2005)
- (United States) John M. Mack (1972)
- (United States) Ray Magliozzi (2018)
- (United States) Tom Magliozzi (2018)
- (Italy) (Canada) Sergio Marchionne (2019)
- (United Kingdom) Lionel Martin (2013)
- (Germany) Wilhelm Maybach (1996)
- (United States) Frank E. McCarthy (2002)
- (United States) Denise McCluggage (2001)
- (United States) Robert B. McCurry (1997)
- (United States) Brouwer D. McIntyre (1975)
- (Canada) Robert S. McLaughlin (1973)
- (United States) Robert S. McNamara (1995)
- (Canada) Rene C. McPherson (1991)
- (United States) William E. Metzger (2008)
- (France) André Michelin (2002)
- (France) Édouard Michelin (2002)
- (United States) Arjay Miller (2006)
- (United States) Harry A. Miller (2003)
- (United States) William L. Mitchell (1993)
- (Italy) Luca di Montezemolo (2015)
- (United States) Hubert Moog (1988)
- (United States) Jim Moran (2005)
- (United States) Charles S. Mott (1973)
- (United States) Alan Mulally (2016)
- (United States) Shirley Muldowney (2005)
- (United States) Thomas Murphy (1990)
- (United States) Ralph Nader (2016)
- (United States) Charles W. Nash (1975)
- (United States) Henry J. Nave (1992)
- (Germany) Heinrich Nordhoff (1985)
- (Japan) Taiichi Ohno (2022)
- (United States) Barney Oldfield (1968)
- (United States) Ransom E. Olds (1968)
- (Germany) Carl Opel (1998)
- (Germany) Friedrich Opel (1998)
- (Germany) Heinrich Opel (1998)
- (Germany) Ludwig Opel (1998)
- (Germany) Wilhelm Opel (1998)
- (Germany) Nikolaus A. Otto (1996)
- (United States) James Ward Packard (1999)
- (United States) William Doud Packard (1999)
- (United States) Wally Parks (2000)
- (United States) Charles Richard and Frederick Douglass Patterson (inducted 2020/21 - founded first African-American Automobile company)
- (United States) Peter-Frans Pauwels (2026)
- (United States) Roger S. Penske (2015)
- Thomas S. Perry (1996)
- (United States) Donald Petersen (1992)
- (United States) Richard Petty (2002)
- (France) Armand Peugeot (1999)
- (Austria) Ferdinand Piech (2014)
- (United States) Charles M. Pigott (1998)
- (United States) Charles J. Pilliod (1992)
- (Italy) Sergio Pininfarina (2007)
- (United States) Harold A. Poling (1999)
- (United States) Ralph Lane Polk (2001)
- (Germany) Ferdinand Porsche (1987)
- (United States) J. David Power III (2014)
- (Germany) Heinz C. Prechter (2004)
- (United States) William A. Raftery (1997)
- (United States) Alice Huyler Ramsey (2000)
- (France) Louis Renault (2003)
- (United States) Walter P. Reuther (1990)
- (United States) Edward V. Rickenbacker (1973)
- (United States) James M. Roche (1992)
- (United States) Willard F. Rockwell Sr. (1980)
- (United States) George W. Romney (1995)
- (United States) Helene Rother Ackernecht (2020/2021)
- (United States) Jack Roush (2017)
- (United Kingdom) Frederick Henry Royce (1991)
- (United States) Patrick Ryan (2019)
- (United States) James A. Ryder (1985)
- (Italy) Bruno Sacco (2006)
- (United States) George N. Schuster (2010)
- (United States) Mort Schwartz (2008)
- (United States) Louis Schwitzer Sr. (1970)
- (United States) Wendell Oliver Scott Sr. (2024)
- (India) (United States) Vivek Chaand Sehgal (2024)
- (United States) Kenneth W. Self (1994)
- (Brazil) Ayrton Senna (2025)
- (United States) Wilbur Shaw (1987)
- (United States) Carroll H. Shelby (1992)
- (United States) Betty Skelton (2025)
- (United States) Owen R. Skelton (2002)
- (United States) Alfred P. Sloan Jr. (1967)
- (United States) Arthur O. Smith (1988)
- (United States) Lloyd Smith (1988)
- (United States) John F. "Jack" Smith Jr. (2005)
- (United States) Charles E. Sorensen (2001)
- (United States) Hal Sperlich (2009)
- (United States) Clarence W. Spicer (1995)
- (United States) Lyn St. James (2022)
- (United States) Francis E. Stanley (1996)
- (United States) Freelan O. Stanley (1996)
- (United Kingdom) Sir Jackie Stewart (2013)
- (United States) Walter W. Stillman (1987)
- (United States) John W. Stokes (1970)
- (United States) William B. Stout (2001)
- (United States) Robert A. Stranahan Sr. (1979)
- (United States) Frank Stronach (2018)
- (United States) John M. Studebaker (2005)
- (United States) Harry C. Stutz (1993)
- (Japan) Genichi Taguchi (1997)
- (India) Ratan N. Tata (2015)
- (United States) Walter C. Teagle (1974)
- (United States) Ralph R. Teetor (1988)
- (United States) John J. Telnack (2008)
- (United States) Mickey Thompson (2009)
- (United States) McKinley W. Thompson Jr. (2023)
- (United States) Henry M. Timken (1977)
- (Japan) Akio Toyoda (2026)
- (Japan) Eiji Toyoda (1994)
- (Japan) Kiichiro Toyoda (2018)
- (Japan) Shoichiro Toyoda (2007)
- (United States) Alex Tremulis (2014)
- (United States) Preston Tucker (1999)
- (United States) Edwin J. Umphrey (1974)
- (France) Corinne Vigreux (2026)
- (United States) Jesse G. Vincent (1971)
- (United States) Roy Warshawsky (2001)
- (United States) Elmer H. Wavering (1989)
- (United States) Edward T. Welburn (2017)
- (United States) J. Irving Whalley (1981)
- (United States) Rollin H. White (1997)
- (United States) Walter C. White (1997)
- (United States) Windsor T. White (1997)
- (United States) Charlie Wiggins (2020/2021)
- (United States) John L. Wiggins (1975)
- (United States) C. Harold Wills (1970)
- (United States) John N. Willys (2008)
- (United States) Charles E. Wilson (1969)
- (United States) Alexander Winton (2005)
- (United States) Larry Wood (2023)
- (Japan) Jiro Yanase (2004)
- (United States) Fred M. Young (1986)
- (United States) Frederick M. Zeder (1998)
- (Germany) Ferdinand Graf von Zeppelin (1998)
- (Germany) Dieter Zetsche (2025)

== Other similar institutions ==
In 2001, the European Automotive Hall of Fame was established and inducted its first 13 members. Permanent plaques of honor will be emplaced at Palexpo, the home of the Geneva Auto Show.

== See also ==
- List of motor vehicle awards
