= Mechanical snubber =

Structural connector designed to protect from shock

A mechanical snubber is a device designed to protect components from excess shock or sway caused by seismic disturbances or other transient forces. Under normal operating conditions, the snubber allows for movement in tension and compression. When an impulse event occurs, the snubber acts as a restraint device. The device becomes rigid, absorbs the dynamic energy, and transfers it to the supporting structure.

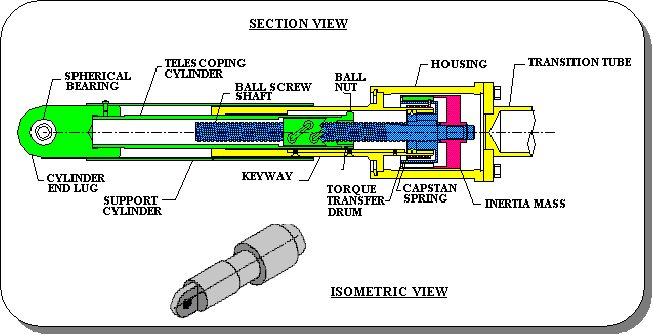

The image shows an isometric view of one style of mechanical snubber. When a disturbance occurs that exceeds the acceleration threshold of the snubber, the ball screw and drum produce angular momentum to the inertia mass. The inertial resistance of the mass engages the resilient capstan to tighten around a hardened mandrel, which is part of the structural tube. This, in turn, causes restraining force against the rotation of the ball screw. During standard operation, the associated acceleration is far below the threshold limit of the snubber and does not activate the capstan spring.

== Applications ==
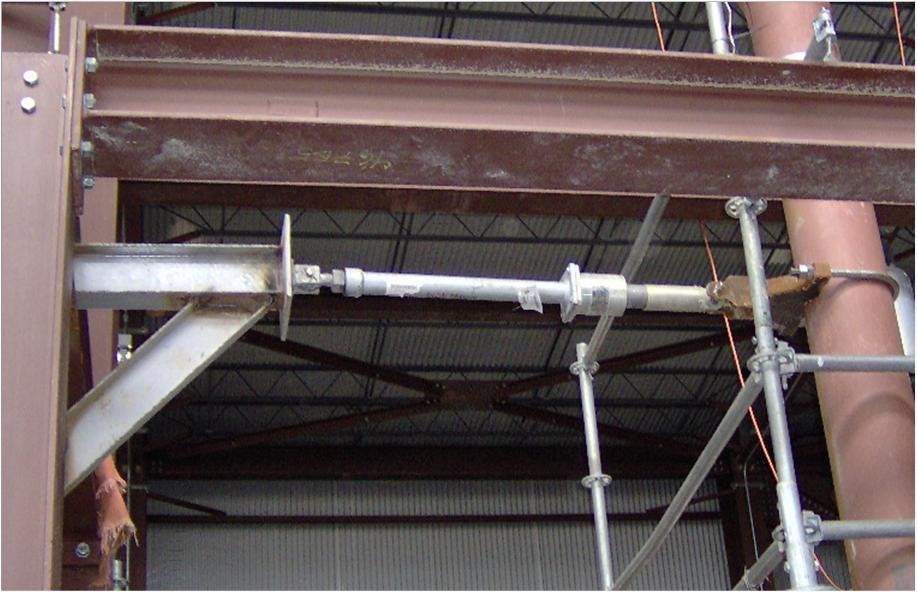
Mechanical Snubber in Application - Piping Technology

Process impulse events

- water hammer
- tripped valve
- pipe rupture
- protection from overtravel or overstress by reducing the structural response

== External impulse events ==
- seismic event (such as an earthquake)
- unexpected failure of adjacent components
- high wind loads

== See also ==
- Shock absorber
