= Carl Breer =

American engineer

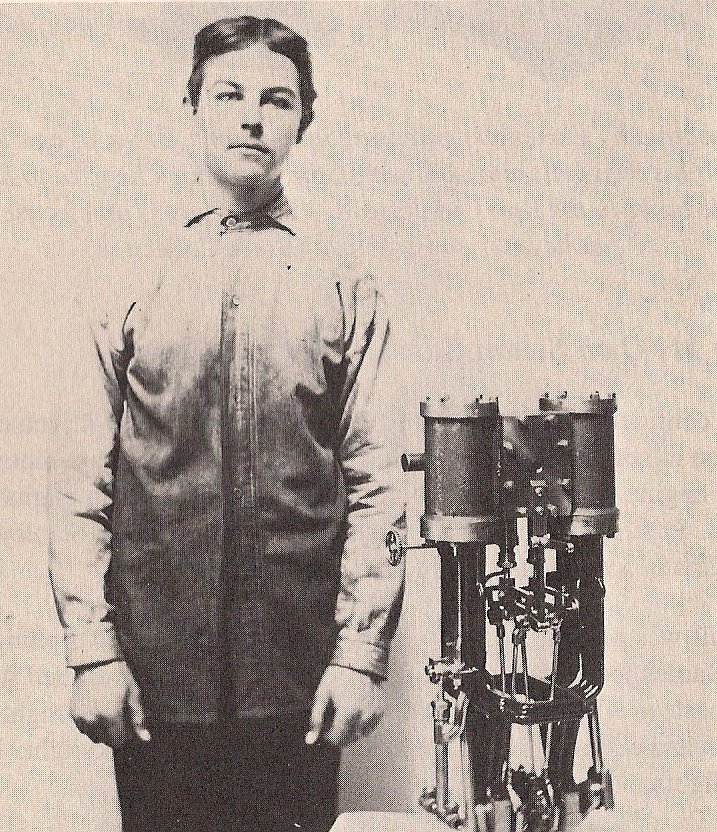
- Breer in 1900
- Born: November 8, 1883; Los Angeles, California, U.S.
- Died: December 21, 1970 (aged 87); Detroit, Michigan, U.S.
- Occupation: Engineer

Carl Breer (November 8, 1883 – December 21, 1970) was an American scientist and engineer, and one of the Studebaker engineers known as the Three Musketeers.

== Biography ==
His family was from Germany.

He was born on November 8, 1883, in Los Angeles, California.

He was married to the sister of Frederick Morrell Zeder and had four sons.

He died on December 21, 1970.

== Education ==
He attended the Los Angeles Commercial High School. He completed his degree in mechanical engineering.

== Career ==
He was one of the Studebaker engineers known as the Three Musketeers. They were instrumental in the founding of the Chrysler Corporation, and were hand-picked by Walter Chrysler to come with him when he started the new company. Carl Breer was a skilled marketer who assembled an odd lot of automobile companies, which was dubbed the smaller General Motors.

== Awards ==
He was inducted into the Automotive Hall of Fame in 1976.
