= Walter Chrysler =

American automotive industry executive (1875–1940)

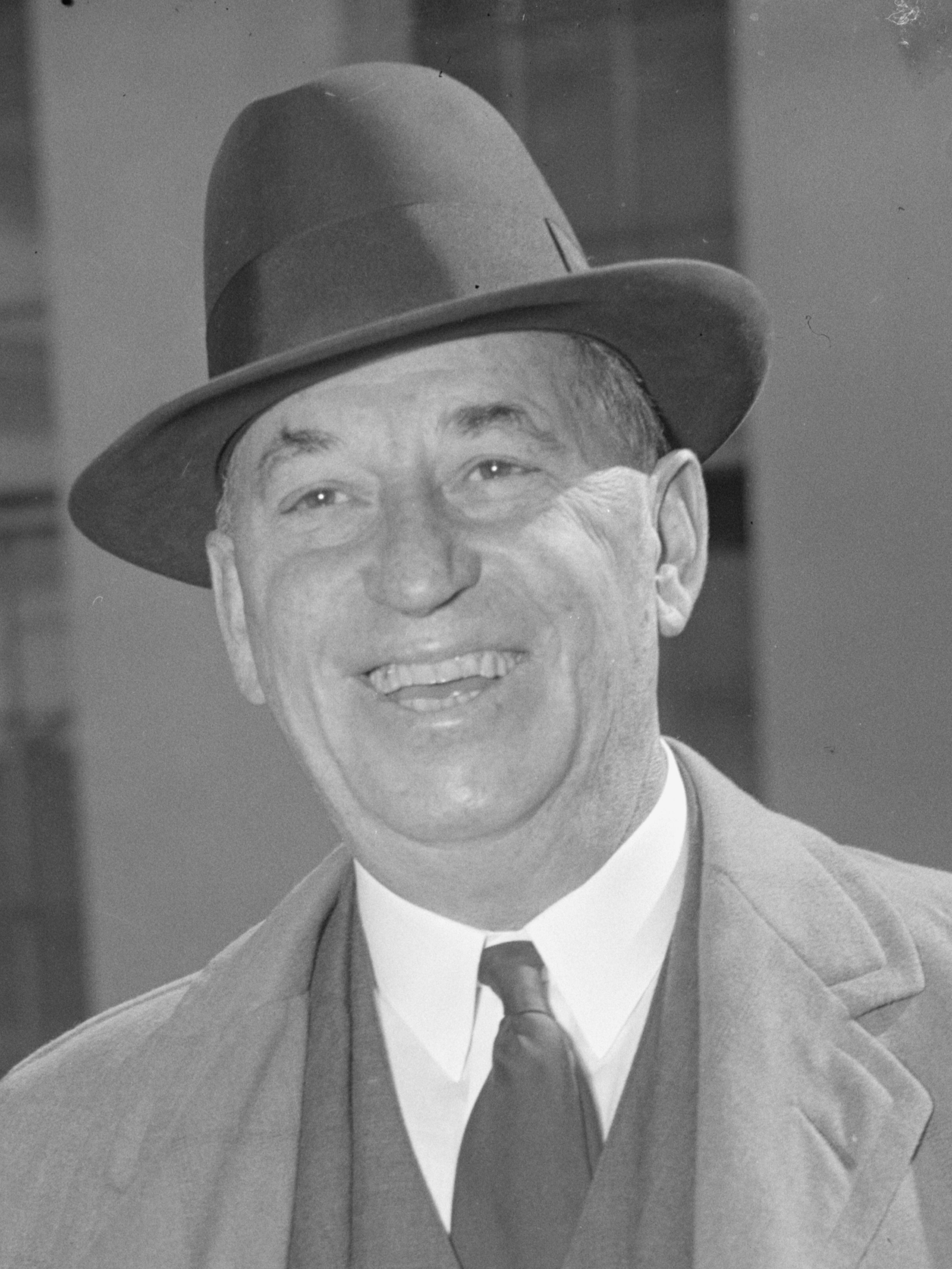
- Chrysler in 1937
- Born: Walter Percy Chrysler; April 2, 1875; Wamego, Kansas, U.S.
- Died: August 18, 1940 (aged 65); Kings Point, New York, U.S.
- Resting place: Sleepy Hollow Cemetery
- Education: International Correspondence Schools
- Occupations: Machinist; business executive
- Known for: Founder of the Chrysler Corporation
- Spouse: Della Viola Forker (died 1938)
- Children: 4, including Walter Jr.
- Relatives: Edgar Garbisch (son-in-law)

Walter Percy Chrysler (April 2, 1875 – August 18, 1940) was an American industrial pioneer in the automotive industry, automotive industry executive, and the founder and namesake of American Chrysler Corporation.

== Early life ==
Chrysler was born in Wamego, Kansas, the son of Anna Maria Chrysler (née Breymann) and Henry Chrysler. He grew up in Ellis, Kansas, where today his childhood home is a museum. His father was born in Chatham, Ontario, in 1850 and immigrated to the United States after 1858. A Freemason, Chrysler began his career as a machinist and railroad mechanic in Ellis. He took correspondence courses from International Correspondence Schools in Scranton, Pennsylvania, earning a mechanical degree from the correspondence program. At school he met his later wife Della Viola Forker.

== Railroad career ==
Chrysler apprenticed in the railroad shops at Ellis as a machinist and railroad mechanic. He then spent a period of years roaming the west, working for various railroads as a roundhouse mechanic with a reputation of being good at valve-setting jobs. Chrysler moved frequently, first to Wellington, Kansas, in 1897, then to Denver, Colorado for two weeks, and finally Cheyenne, Wyoming. Some of his moves were due to restlessness and a quick temper, but his roaming was also a way to become more well-rounded in his railroad knowledge. He worked his way up through positions such as foreman in Trinidad, Colorado, superintendent, division master mechanic, and general master mechanic.

During 1905 and 1906, Chrysler worked for the Fort Worth and Denver Railway in Childress in West Texas. He later lived and worked in Oelwein, Iowa, at the main shops of the Chicago Great Western, where there is a small park dedicated to him.

The pinnacle of his railroading career came at Pittsburgh, Pennsylvania, where he became works manager of the Allegheny locomotive erecting shops of the American Locomotive Company (Alco). While working in Pittsburgh, Chrysler lived in the town of Bellevue, the first town outside of Pittsburgh on the north side of the Ohio River.

== Automotive career ==
Chrysler's automotive career began in 1911 when he received a summons to meet with James J. Storrow, a banker who was a director of Alco. Storrow asked him if he had given any thought to automobile manufacture. Chrysler had been an auto enthusiast for over five years by then, and was very interested. Storrow arranged a meeting with Charles W. Nash, then president of the Buick Motor Company, who was looking for a smart production chief. Chrysler, who had resigned from many railroading jobs over the years, made his final resignation from railroading to become works manager (in charge of production) at Buick in Flint, Michigan. He found many ways to reduce the costs of production, such as putting an end to finishing automobile undercarriages with the same luxurious quality of finish that the body warranted.

In 1916, William C. Durant, who founded General Motors in 1908, had retaken GM from bankers who had taken over the company. Chrysler, who was closely tied to the bankers, submitted his resignation to Durant, then based in New York City.

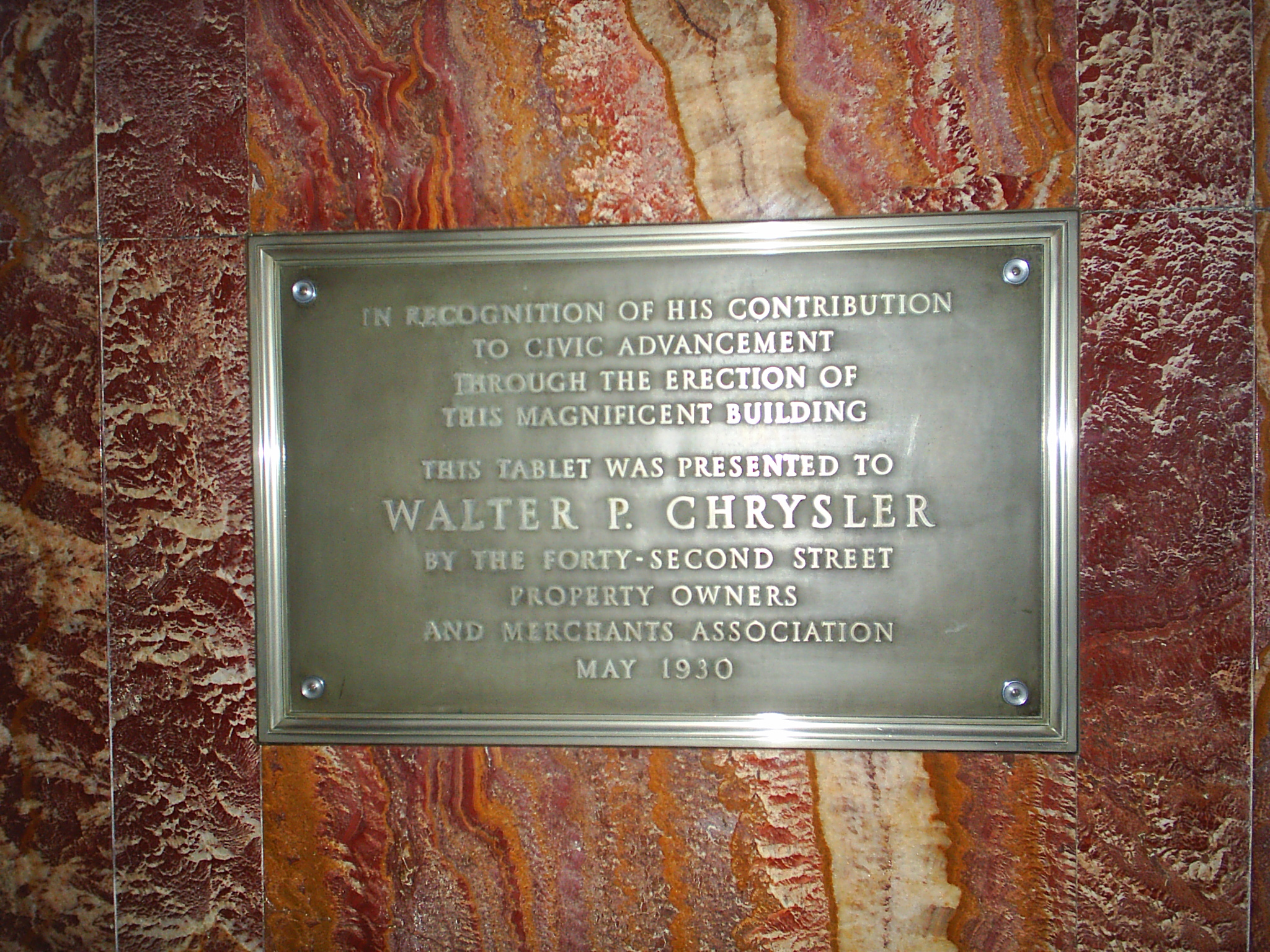
This plaque is located in the lobby of the Chrysler Building.

Durant took the first train to Flint to make an attempt to keep Chrysler at the helm of Buick. Durant made the then-unheard of salary offer of $10,000 (equivalent to $295,872 in 2025) a month for three years, with a $500,000 (equivalent to $14.8 million in 2025) bonus at the end of each year, or $500,000 (equivalent to $14.8 million in 2025) in stock. Additionally, Chrysler would report directly to Durant, and would have full run of Buick without interference from anyone. Apparently in shock, Chrysler asked Durant to repeat the offer, which he did. Chrysler immediately accepted.

Chrysler ran Buick successfully for three more years. Not long after his three-year contract was up, he resigned from his job as president of Buick in 1919. He did not agree with Durant's vision for the future of General Motors. Durant paid Chrysler $10 million (equivalent to $186 million in 2025) for his GM stock. Chrysler had started at Buick in 1911 for $6,000 a year (equivalent to $207,321 in 2025), and left one of the richest men in the United States. GM replaced Chrysler with Harry H. Bassett a protege who had risen through the ranks at the Weston-Mott axle manufacturing company, by then a subsidiary of Buick.

Chrysler was then hired to attempt a turnaround by bankers who foresaw the loss of their investment in Willys-Overland Motor Company in Toledo, Ohio. He demanded and received a salary of $1 million (equivalent to $18.6 million in 2025) a year for two years, an astonishing amount at that time. When Chrysler left Willys in 1921 after an unsuccessful attempt to wrestle control from John Willys, he acquired a controlling interest in the ailing Maxwell Motor Company. Chrysler phased out Maxwell and absorbed it into his new firm, the Chrysler Corporation, in Detroit, Michigan, in 1925. In addition to his namesake car company, Plymouth and DeSoto marques were created, and in 1928 Chrysler purchased Dodge Brothers and renamed it Dodge. The same year he financed the construction of the Chrysler Building in New York City, which was completed in 1930. Chrysler was named Time magazine's Man of the Year for 1928.

He was inducted into the Automotive Hall of Fame in 1967.

Chrysler served as chairman of the board for the Chrysler Corporation from its founding until his death.

== Personal life ==
Chrysler married Della Viola Forker with whom he raised their family while pursuing his career. Their children include:

- Thelma Irene Chrysler
- Bernice Chrysler
- Walter Percy Chrysler Jr.
- John Forker Chrysler

== Later life and death ==
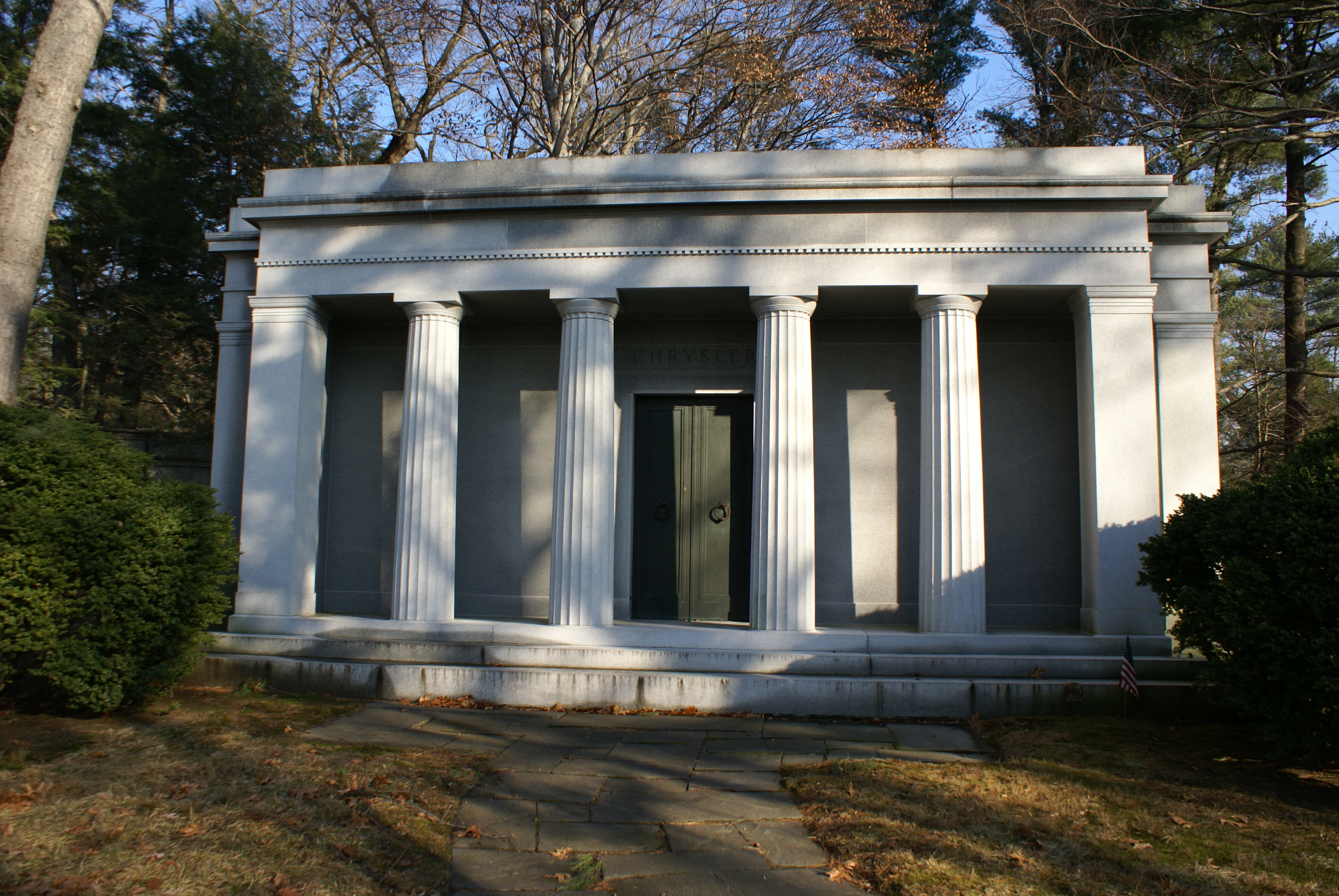
The mausoleum of Walter Chrysler at Sleepy Hollow Cemetery

In 1923, Chrysler purchased from Henri Willis Bendel a twelve-acre (5 ha) waterfront estate at Kings Point on Long Island, New York, and renamed it Forker House. In December 1941, the property was sold to the U.S. government's War Shipping Department and became known as Wiley Hall as part of the United States Merchant Marine Academy.

Chrysler also built a country estate in Warrenton, Virginia, in what is referred to as the Virginia horse country and home to the Warrenton Hunt. In 1934, he purchased and undertook a major restoration of the Fauquier White Sulphur Springs Company resort and spa in Warrenton. Sold in 1953, the property was developed as a country club.

Chrysler turned 61 in the spring of 1936 and stepped down from an active role in the day-to-day business of the company. Two years later, his wife died at the age of 58 and Chrysler, devastated by the loss of his childhood sweetheart, suffered a stroke. His previously robust health never recovered from this, and he died of a cerebral hemorrhage in August 1940 at Forker House in Kings Point, New York. He was buried at Sleepy Hollow Cemetery in Sleepy Hollow, New York.

== Ancestry ==
Walter Chrysler's father, Henry (Hank) Chrysler, was a Canadian, of German, English and Dutch ancestry. He was an American Civil War veteran who was a locomotive engineer for the Kansas Pacific Railway and its successor, the Union Pacific Railroad. Walter's mother was born in Rocheport, Missouri, and was also of German ancestry. Walter Chrysler was not especially interested in his remote ancestors; his collaborative author Boyden Sparkes says that one genealogical researcher reported "that he had a sea-going Dutchman among his forebears; one Captain Jan Gerritsen Van Dalsen", but that "as to that, Walter Chrysler made it plain to me he was in accord with Jimmy Durante: 'Ancestors? I got millions of 'em!'." However, he thought enough of genealogy to include in his autobiography that his father, Hank Chrysler, "Canadian born, had been brought from Chatham, Ontario, to Kansas City when he was only five or six. His forebears had founded Chatham; the family stock was German; eight generations back of me there had come to America one who spelled his name Greisler, a German Palatine. He was one of a group of Protestants who had left their German homeland in the Rhine Valley, gone to the Netherlands, thence to England and embarked, finally, from Plymouth for New York."

Other researchers have since traced his ancestors in more detail. Karin Holl's monograph on the subject traces the family tree to a Johann Philipp Kreißler, born in 1672, who left Germany for New York in 1709. Chrysler's ancestors came from the Rhineland-Palatinate town of Guntersblum. His family belongs to Old Stock Americans.

== See also ==
- Chrysler Corporation
- Chrysler Building
- Carl Breer
- Owen Ray Skelton
- Frederick Morrell Zeder
- The Three Musketeers (Studebaker engineers)
