= Frederick Morrell Zeder =

American scientist (1886–1951)

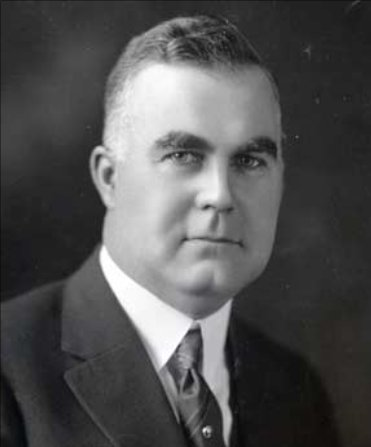
- Zeder in 1922
- Born: March 19, 1886; Bay City, Michigan, U.S.
- Died: February 24, 1951 (aged 64); Miami Beach, Florida, U.S.
- Resting place: Holy Sepulchre Cemetery
- Education: University of Michigan
- Occupations: Engineer; scientist
- Spouse: Lucille Monroe (m. 1919)
- Children: 4

Frederick Morrell Zeder (March 19, 1886 – February 24, 1951) was an American scientist and engineer who was one of the Studebaker engineers known as The Three Musketeers.

== Early life ==
Frederick Morrell Zeder was born on March 19, 1886, in Bay City, Michigan, to Rudolph John Zeder. At the age of eleven, Zeder worked at a box factory. He then worked as a railroad call boy, car checker and machinist apprentice. He attended Bay City High School. He graduated from the University of Michigan in 1909 with a bachelor's degree in mechanical engineering.

== Career ==
After graduating, Zeder worked as an apprentice at Allis-Chalmers in Milwaukee. In 1910, he became an erecting engineer at the firm. Later in 1910, Zeder joined E-M-F Company and became a leader in the company's engineering laboratories.

In 1913, Zeder joined Studebaker as a consulting engineer and later became chief engineer. He left Studebaker in 1920. In 1921, he joined Skelton and Breer in forming the Zeder-Skelton-Breer Engineering Company, a partnership that would later be known as The Three Musketeers. They were involved in the founding of the Chrysler Corporation, and were hand-picked by Walter Chrysler, then with Maxwell Motor Corporation, to come with him when he started the new company in 1923. He helped design the original Chrysler car in 1924. Zeder served as vice chairman of Chrysler's board of directors and vice president of engineering until his death.

Zeder served as special consultant to the Chief of Army Ordnance in World War II. In 1941, Zeder became president of the Detroit Area Council of Boy Scouts of America. He served as director of the Grand Opera Society, director of the United Foundation and as a member of the state advisory board of the National Foundation for Infantile Paralysis. He was a member of the American Society of Civil Engineers, the Engineering Society of Detroit, the Franklin Institute and the American Society for Testing Materials.

== Personal life ==
Zeder married Lucille Monroe in 1919. They had one son and three daughters, Fred M. Jr., Dorothy June, Priscilla Ann and Margaret Lucille. He lived at 17500 E. Jefferson in Grosse Pointe.

Zeder died while on vacation on February 24, 1951, at St. Francis Hospital in Miami Beach. He was buried at Holy Sepulchre Cemetery.

== Awards ==
Zeder received an honorary master's degree in engineering from the University of Michigan in 1933. He was inducted into the Automotive Hall of Fame in 1998.
