= Willys Americar =

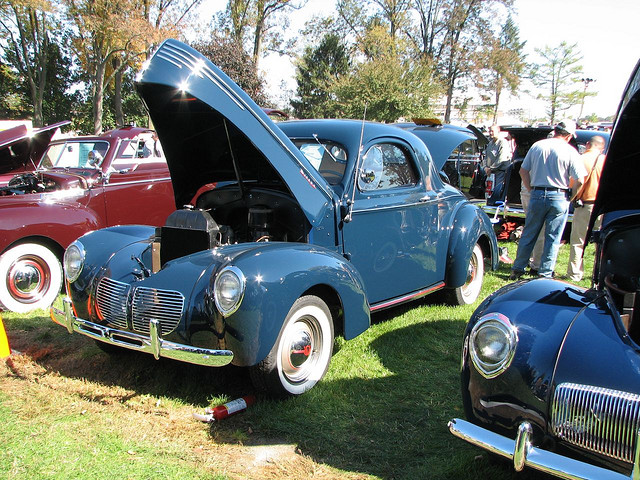

Overview
- Manufacturer: Willys-Overland Motors
- Production: 1937-1942
- Assembly: Toledo, Ohio
- Designer: Barney Roos

Body and chassis
- Class: Compact
- Body style: 2-door coupe; 2-door pickup; 4-door sedan; 3-door wagon
- Layout: Front-engine, rear-wheel-drive

Powertrain
- Engine: 2,199 cc (2.2 L) 60 hp (45 kW) Go-Devil engine I4

Dimensions
- Wheelbase: 2,642 mm (104.0 in)

Chronology
- Predecessor: Willys 77
- Successor: Willys Aero

The Willys Americar was a line of automobiles produced by Willys-Overland Motors from 1937 to 1942, either as a sedan, coupe, station wagon or pickup truck. The coupe version was a popular hot rod choice, either as a donor car or as a fiberglass model.

== History ==
The car started production in 1937 with somewhat traditional styling, a product of the internal reorganization that turned Willys-Overland Motor Company into Willys Overland Motors. It was itself an evolution of the aging Willys 77. When Joseph W. Frazer joined the company in 1938 he decided that a modern-looking and cheap compact car was the answer for the struggling Willys. Models 37, 38 and 39 gradually evolved into a more Ford-like appearance, culminating in the very much DeLuxe-like '40 model.

== The Americar ==
Only the 1941-1942 models were called "Americar" (441 and 442 models respectively), following the patriotic trend of the time. It sold 22,000 units in 1941 and 7,000 more in 1942. Its price was about US$630. Consumers Union Reports considered the 1941 Americar much better than the company's 1940 models, and rated it a Best Buy in the lowest-price group.

As war broke out, civilian production was abandoned by all US motor companies, in order to assist the military, and the Americar was no exception. However Willys was one of the companies awarded a contract to produce the highly successful Jeep. After the end of the war they managed to secure the trademark on the Jeep name, and the much higher sales of its civilian CJ version kept the Toledo firm from resurrecting the prewar models, sealing the fate of the Americar. Despite failed attempts in 1940 and 1945 (both times with Frazer's 6/66 prototype), the 1942 Americar would be Willys-Overland final "civilian" passenger car model until the Willys Aero, ten years later.

=== Models ===
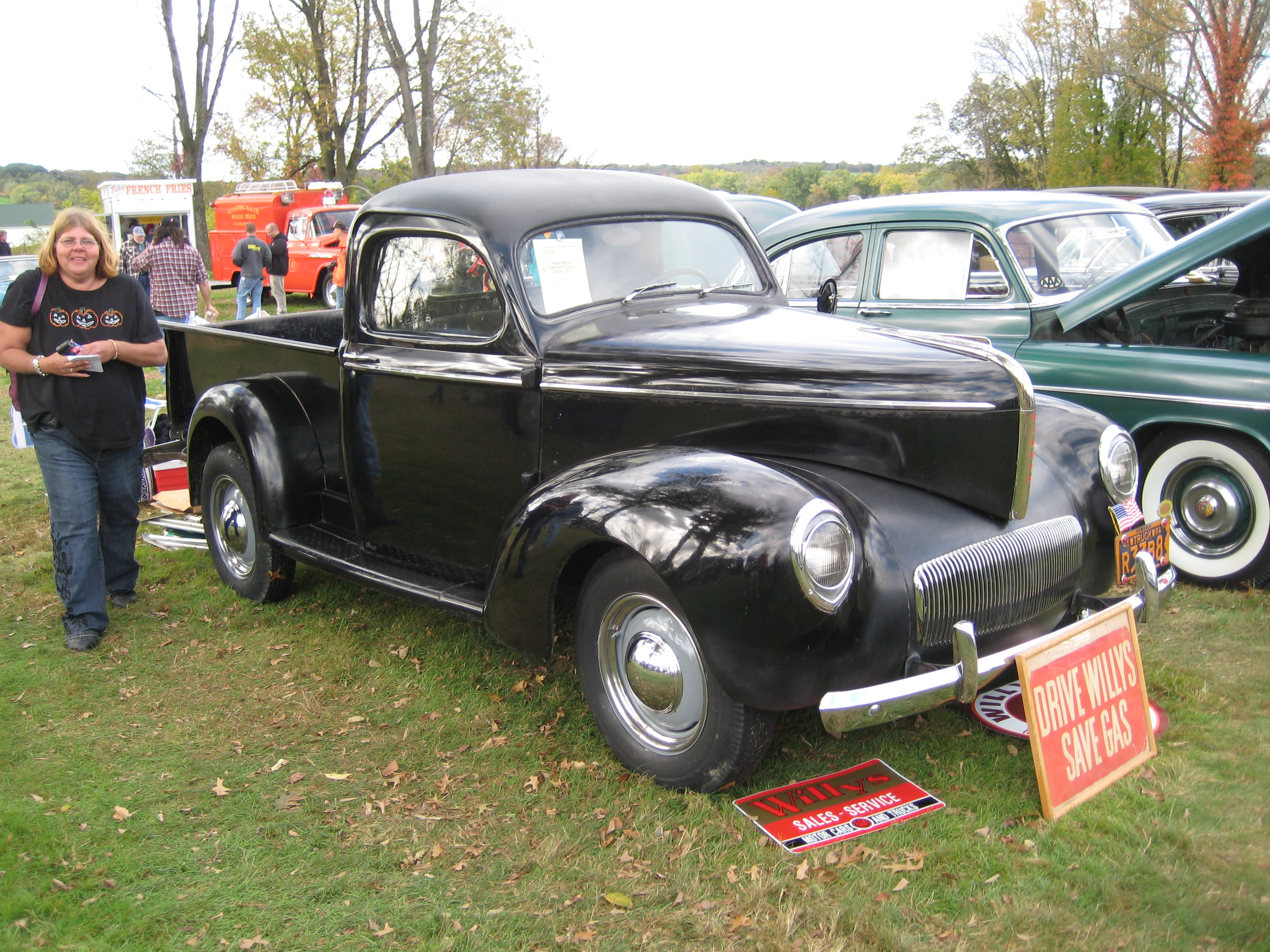
1941 Willys Half-Ton Pick-Up

Three variations — Speedway, DeLuxe and Plainsman — were offered, each with a coupe and sedan, plus a DeLuxe three-door woody wagon. USHCO/USB&F built a small run of station wagon bodies for Willys. Five examples were built on model 440 coupe chassis in 1940, and a second group of five in 1941 on model 441 coupe chassis. All wagons featured a single door on the driver's side and the belt line on the 1941 models differed from those built in 1940.

== Hot rod career ==
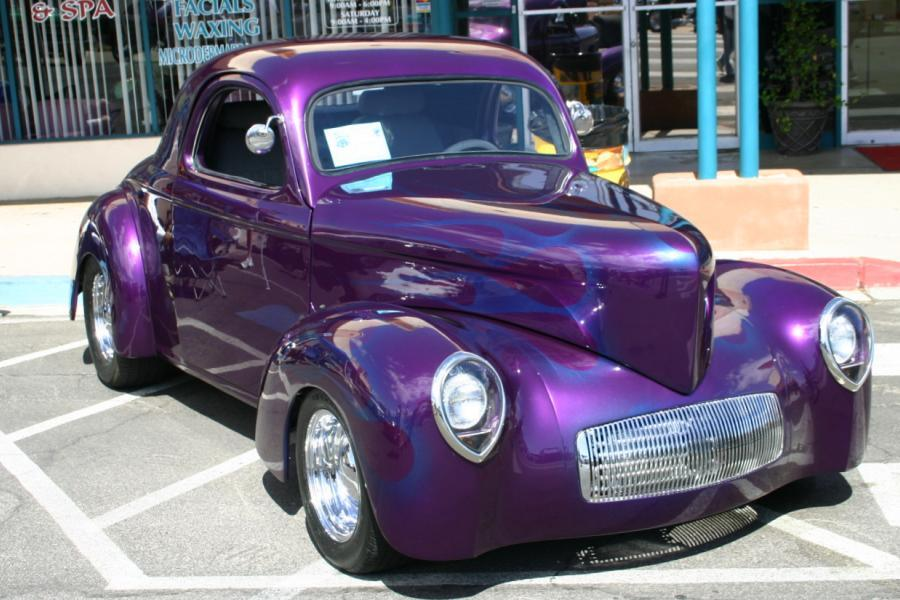
Hot Rod 1941 Willys

Critical four-cylinder engine failures, lack of replacement and repair parts and the lack of assistance from Willys turned many Americars into targets for the nascent hot rod community - the Go Devil engine was replaced with many other alternatives, some weaker, some much stronger than the original specification. This practice eventually became so commonplace that stock Americars have become a rarity.
