= Willys =

American car and truck manufacturing company

Willys–Overland Motors

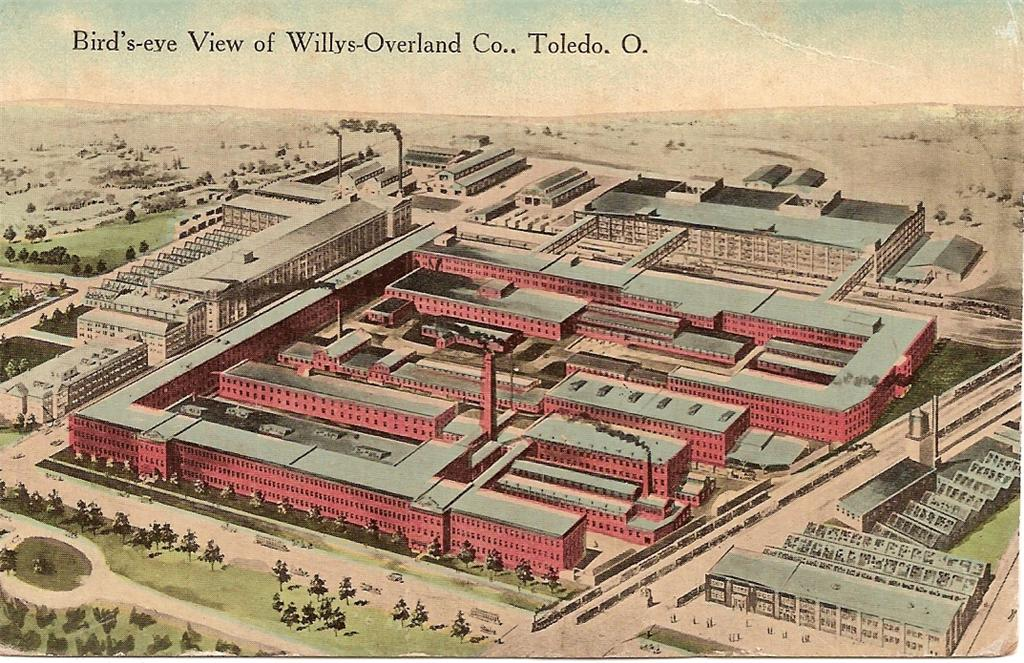
- Willys Factory in Toledo, Ohio, c. 1915
- Type: Private
- Industry: Automotive
- Founded: 31 May 1908
- Founder: John Willys
- Defunct: 1953; 73 years ago
- Fate: Merged into Kaiser Jeep
- Successor: Kaiser Jeep
- Headquarters: Toledo, Ohio, U.S.
- Products: Automobiles; Off-road vehicles
- Brands: Jeep; MB
- Subsidiaries: Curtiss Aeroplane and Motor Company (1917–1920); Overland Automobile

Willys (pronounced /ˈwɪlɪs/ "Willis") (Note: This is the pronunciation used by the company owner and founder, as opposed to "Willy's" or "Willies" (/ˈwɪliz/), although many people pronounce(d) it that way, and Mr. Willys "was probably the type who'd say: 'I don't care how you pronounce it as long as you buy my cars.'" In 1952, the Toledo Blade newspaper got to the bottom of the story and concluded it was "Willis".) was a brand name used by Willys–Overland Motors, an American automobile company, founded by John North Willys. It was best known for its design and production of World War II–era military jeeps (MBs), Willys M38 and M38A1 military jeeps as well as civilian versions (Jeep CJs), and branding the 'jeep' military slang-word into the '(Universal) Jeep' marque.

== History ==
=== Early history ===
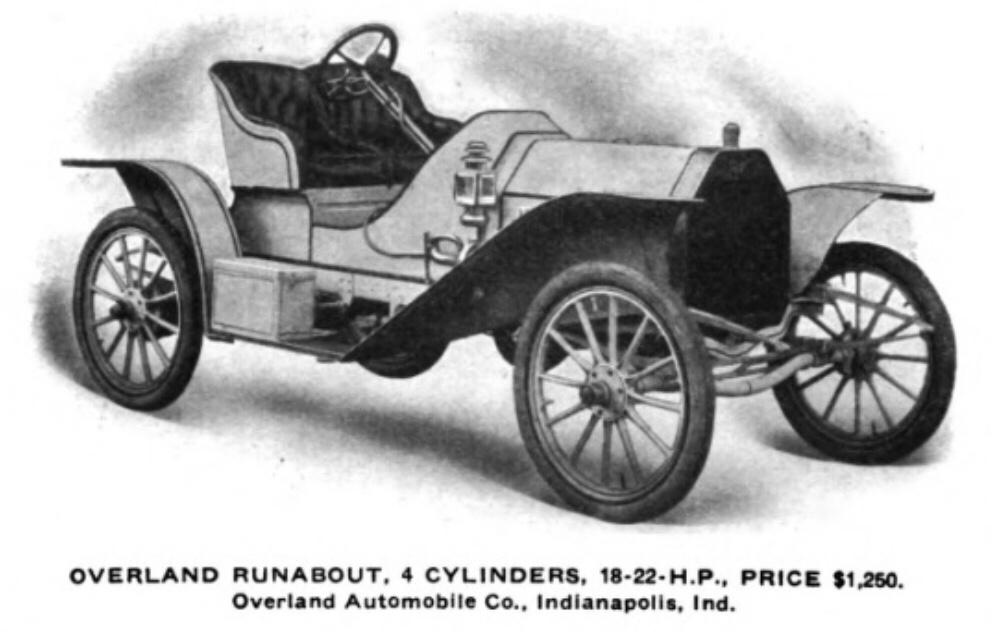
Overland Runabout (1908)

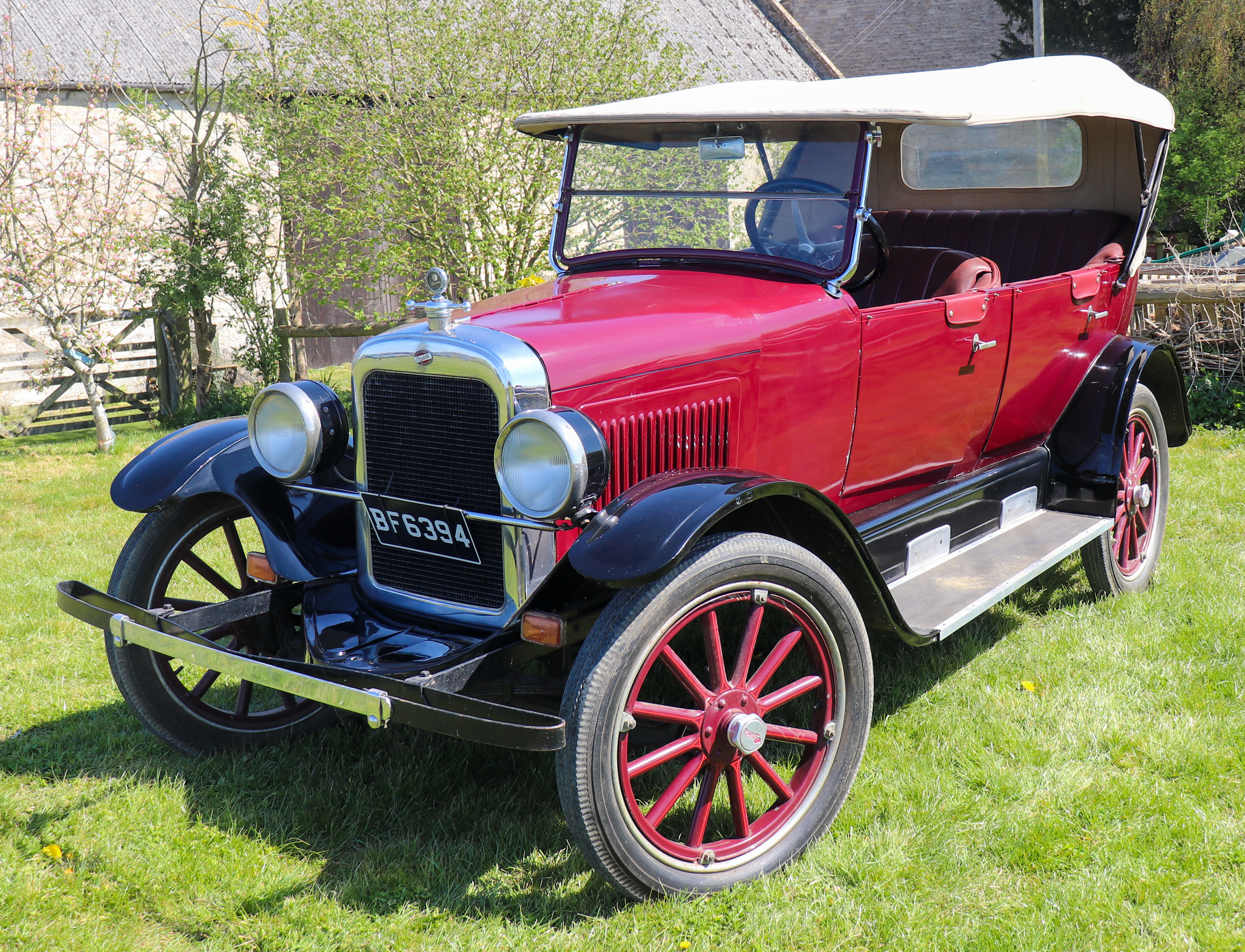
A 1923 Overland Model 92 made by Willys-Overland, "Redbird"

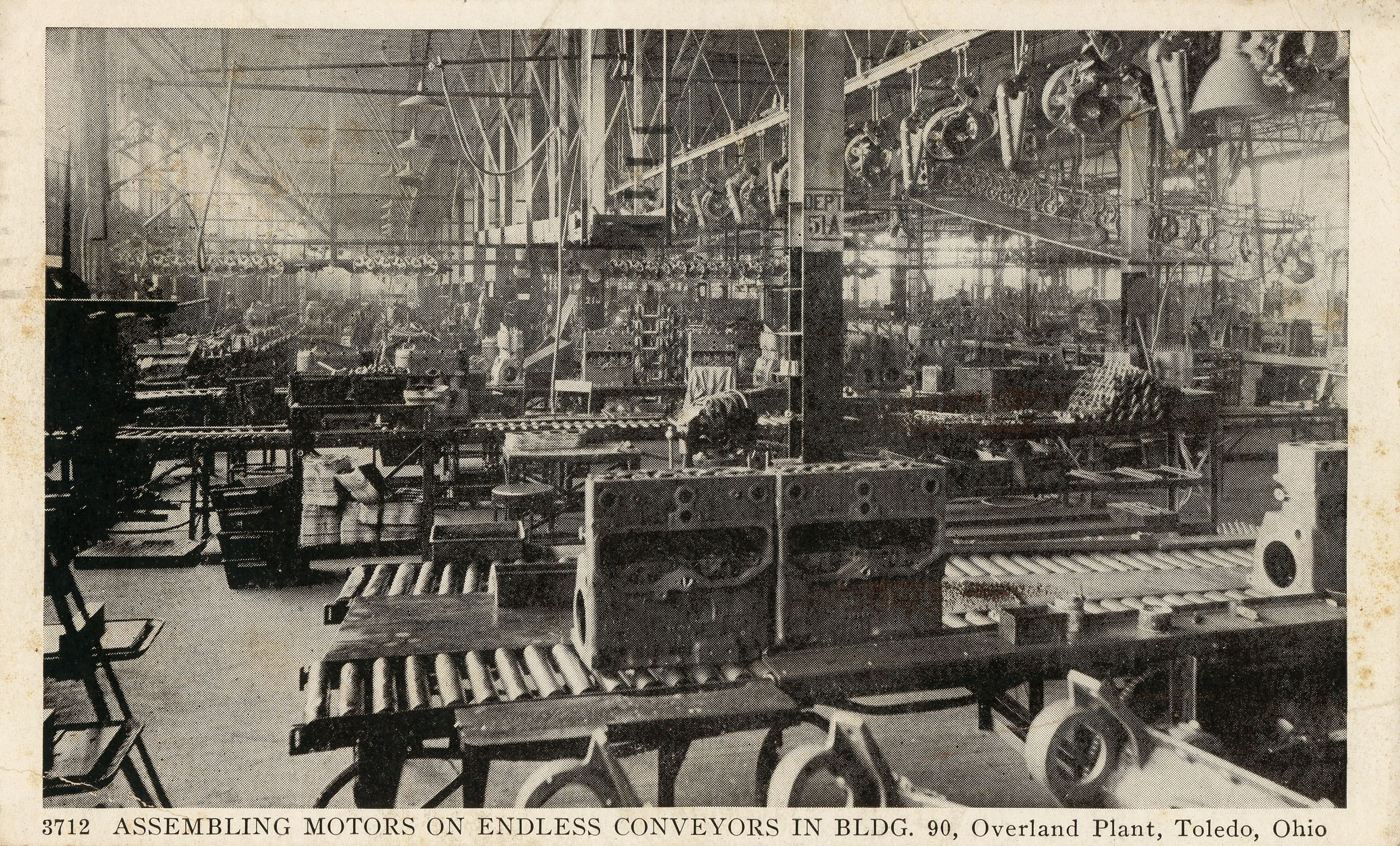
Motor assembly in Building 90, Willys Overland Plant, Toledo, Ohio, 1920

In 1908, John Willys bought the Overland Automotive Division of Standard Wheel Company and in 1912 renamed it Willys–Overland Motor Company. From 1912 to 1918, Willys was the second-largest producer of automobiles in the United States after Ford Motor Company.

In 1913, Willys acquired a license to build Charles Yale Knight's sleeve-valve engine, which it used in cars bearing the Willys–Knight nameplate. In the mid-1920s, Willys also acquired the F. B. Stearns Company of Cleveland and assumed continued production of the Stearns-Knight luxury car, as well.

John Willys acquired the Electric Auto-Lite Company in 1914 and in 1917 formed the Willys Corporation to act as his holding company. In 1916, it acquired the Russell Motor Car Company of Toronto, Ontario, and the Curtiss Aeroplane and Motor Company in Buffalo, New York, by 1917, New Process Gear, and in 1919 acquired the Duesenberg Motors Company plant in Elizabeth, New Jersey. The New Jersey plant was replaced by a new, larger facility in Indianapolis, and was to be the site of production for a new Willys Six at an adjacent site, but the depression of 1920–21 brought the Willys Corporation to its knees. The bankers hired Walter P. Chrysler to sort out the mess and the first model to go was the Willys Six, deemed an engineering disaster. Chrysler had three auto engineers: Owen Skelton, Carl Breer, and Fred Zeder (later nicknamed The Three Musketeers) begin work on a new car, commonly referred to as the Chrysler Six.

To raise cash needed to pay off debts, many of the Willys Corporation assets were put on the auction block. The Elizabeth plant and the Chrysler Six prototype were sold to William C. Durant, then in the process of building a new, third empire. The plant built Durant's low-priced Star, while the Chrysler Six prototype was substantially reworked to become the 1923 Flint.

Walter Chrysler and the three engineers who had been working on the Chrysler Six all moved on to Maxwell-Chalmers where they continued their work, ultimately launching the Chrysler Six in January 1924. (In 1925, the Maxwell car company became the Chrysler Corporation.)

=== Depression era ===
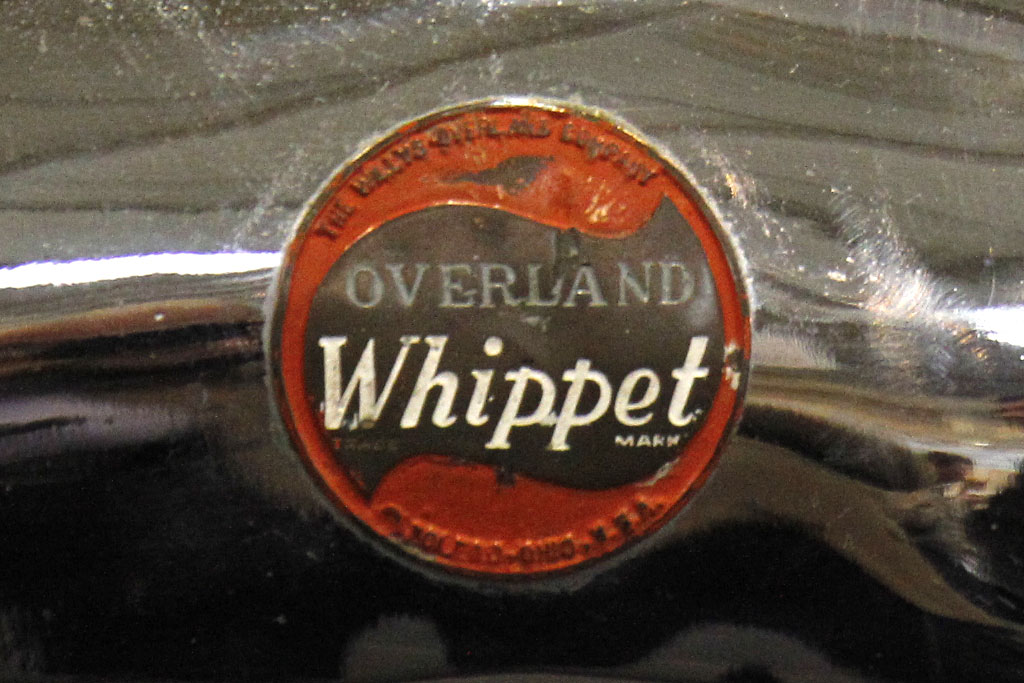
An Overland Whippet badge 1928

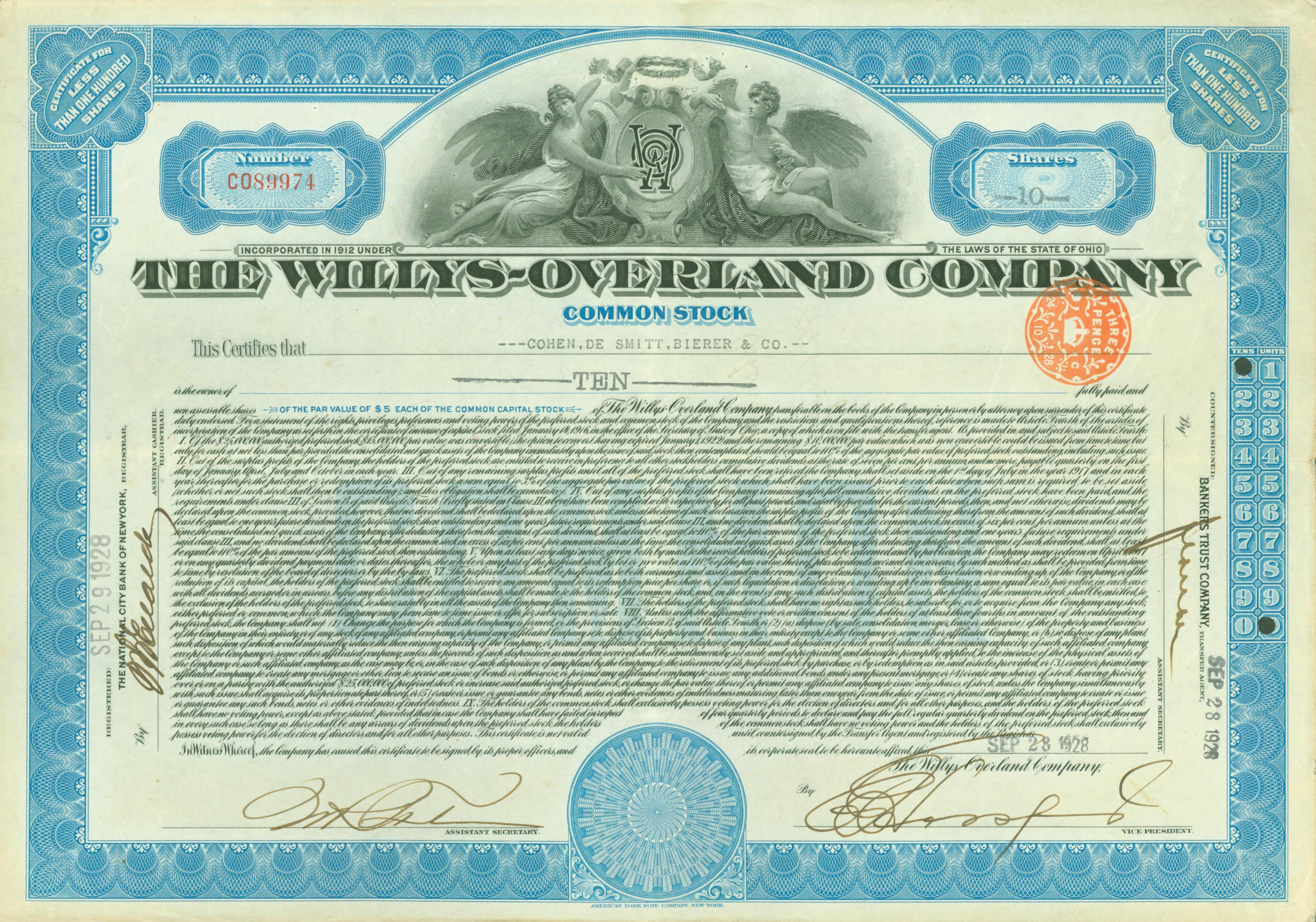
Share of the Willys-Overland Company, issued 28 September 1928

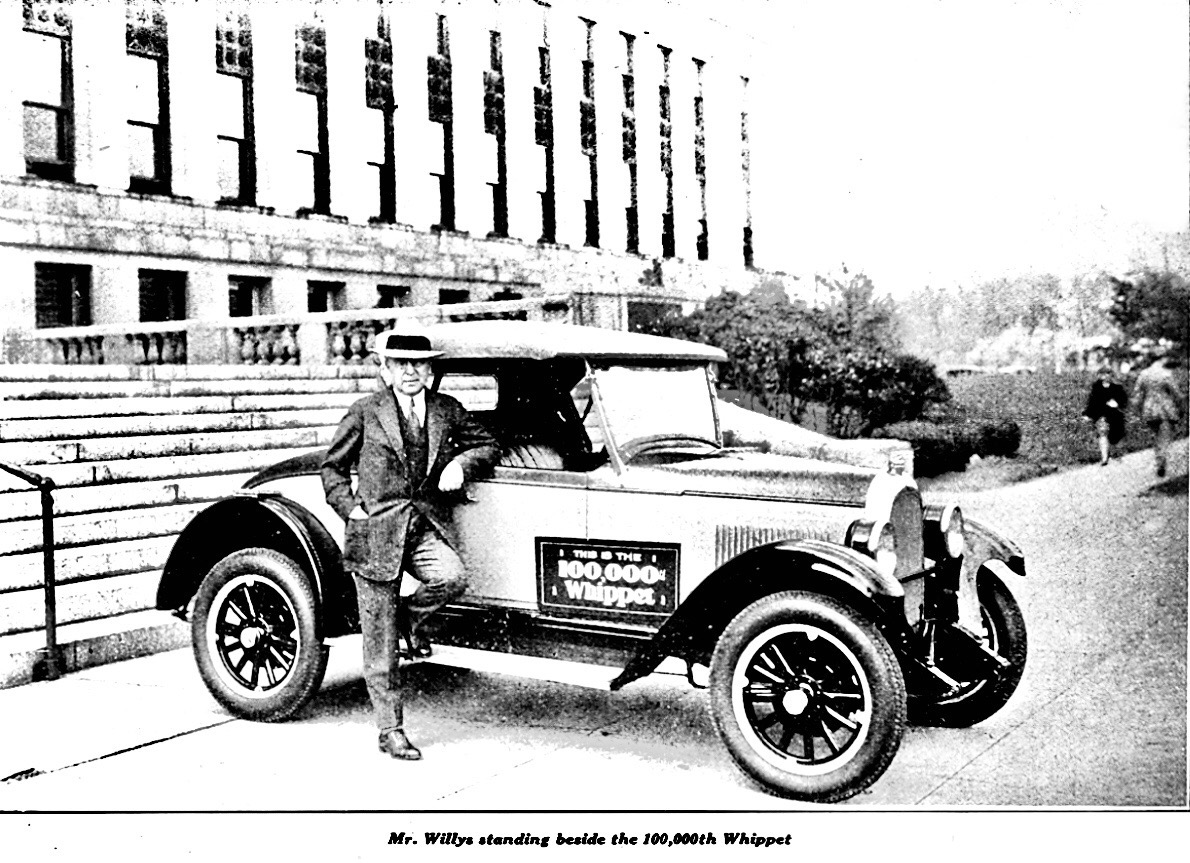
The 100,000th Overland Whippet (1929)

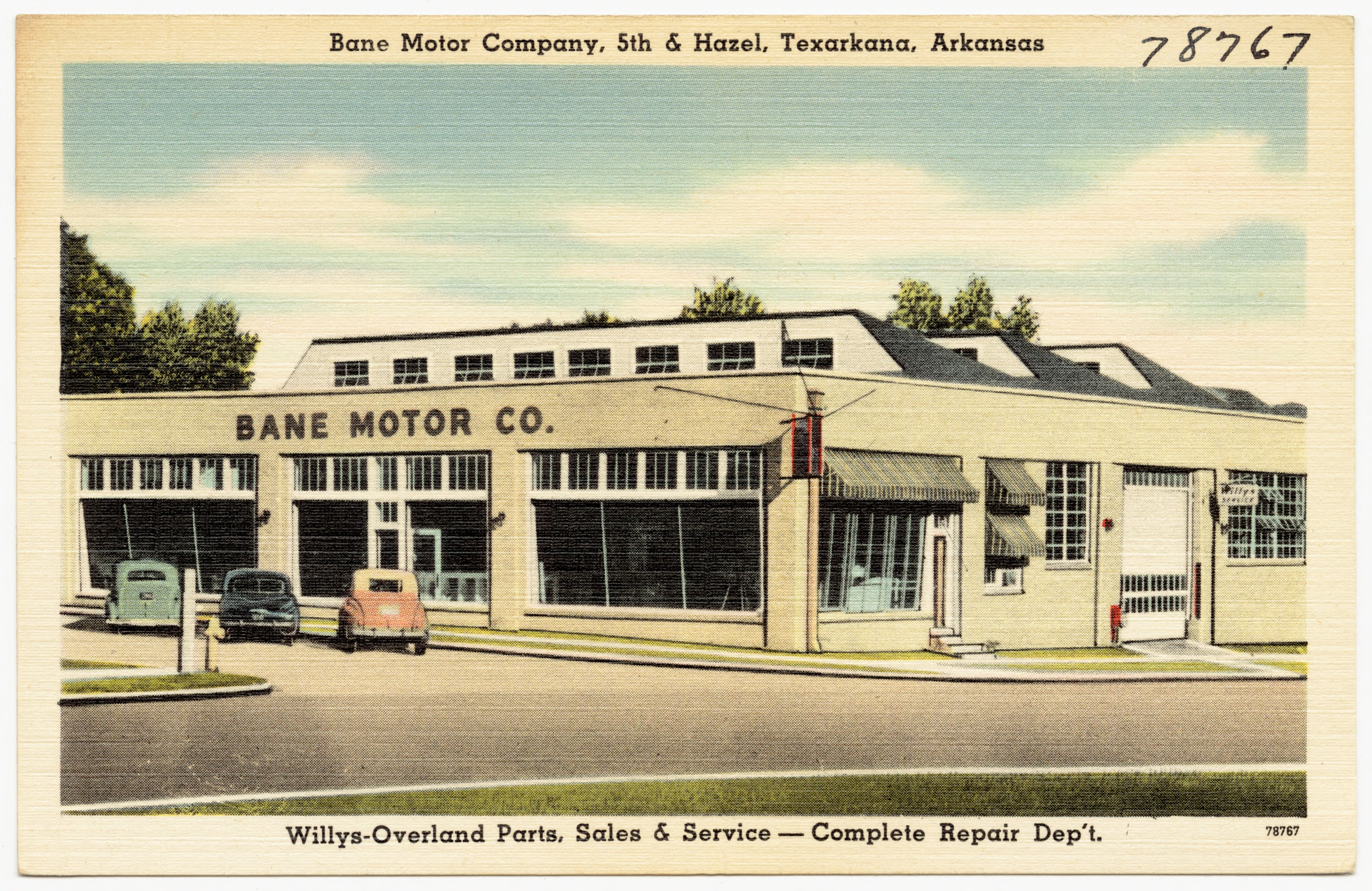
Willys–Overland dealer at 388 East 5th Street, Texarkana, Arkansas, c. 1948

In 1926, Willys–Overland introduced a new line of small cars named Willys–Overland Whippet. In the economic depression of the 1930s, a number of Willys automotive brands faltered. Stearns-Knight was liquidated in 1929. Whippet production ended in 1931; its models were replaced by the Willys Six and Eight. Production of the Willys-Knight ended in 1933. There was also a pickup truck version of the Whippet, called the Willys-Six C-113 (reflecting its wheelbase in inches). This was not a sales success, with a mere 198 units being built. This vehicle was picked up by International Harvester, who installed their own 213-cubic inch engine and offered it in 1933 as the International D-1.

In 1932, Ward M. Canaday, who beginning in 1916 had done advertising for the company before becoming a full-time employee, took on the role of chairman. He helped guide the company through its current receivership.

At this time, Willys decided to clear the boards and produce two new models – the 4-cylinder Willys 77 and the 6-cylinder Willys 99 – but since the firm was once again on the verge of bankruptcy, only the 77 went into production. It was forced to sell its Canadian subsidiary, itself in weak financial shape, and started a massive reorganization. Only the main assembly plant and some smaller factories remained the property of Willys–Overland. The other assets were sold off to a new holding company that leased some of the properties back to W-O. The parent company was thus able to ride out the storm.

In 1936, the Willys–Overland Motor Company was reorganized as Willys–Overland Motors.

In 1937, Willys redesigned the 4-cylinder model. It gained a semistreamlined body with a slanted windshield, headlamps integrally embedded into the fenders, and a one-piece, rounded hood transversely hinged at the rear.

For 1939, the Model 39 featured Lockheed hydraulic brakes, a two-inch increase in wheelbase to 102 inches and an improved 134 CID four-cylinder engine with power increased from 48 to 61 hp. The Model 39 was marketed as an Overland and as a Willys–Overland rather than as a Willys.

In 1929, the company built a factory that built vehicles located at what is now 6201 Randolph Street, Commerce, California. During World War II, the factory built aircraft assemblies for Lockheed Hudson bombers. When the war ended, the factory resumed automobile production and was one of two locations to build the first CJ2A, as well as the Willys Aero. The factory was closed in 1954. The location is now occupied by Prologis Eaves Distribution Center.

=== Jeep ===
Willys–Overland was one of two bidders when the United States Army sought an automaker that could begin rapid production of a lightweight reconnaissance car based on a design by American Bantam.

In 1938, Joseph W. Frazer had joined Willys from Chrysler as chief executive. He saw a need to improve the firm's 4-cylinder engine to handle the abuse to which the vehicle would be subjected. This objective was brilliantly achieved by ex-Studebaker chief engineer Delmar "Barney" Roos, who wanted

an engine that could develop 15 horsepower at 4,400 r.p.m. and run for 150 hours without failure. What he started with was an engine that developed 48 horsepower at 3,400 r.p.m., and could run continuously for only two to four hours ... It took Barney Roos two years to perfect his engine, by a whole complex of revisions that included closer tolerances, tougher alloys, aluminum pistons, and a flywheel reduced in weight from fifty-seven to thirty-one pounds.

American Bantam was the sole manufacturer of serial production jeeps delivered to the US Army in 1940. Ford, American Bantam, and Willys all manufactured jeeps for the US Army in 1941. Production of the Willys MB, commonly called a jeep, began in November 1941. Ford, American Bantam, and Willys together produced 8,598 units in 1940. Willys–Overland ranked 48th among United States corporations in the value of World War II military production contracts. In total, 647,870 military Jeeps were manufactured by the end of World War II, 362,841 by Willys, 280,448 by Ford and 2,675 by American Bantam.

The word "Jeep" was first used to describe US Army "midget cars" in a January 1941 newspaper article, mentioning "Bantam" as the manufacturer. In January 1941 American Bantam was the only manufacturer that had actually fulfilled purchase orders to deliver jeeps to the US Army. Some people believe "jeep" is a phonetic pronunciation of the abbreviation GP, but Ford did not start manufacturing jeeps until February 1941, after news of "jeeps" made by "Bantam" had already been widely reported in the newspapers nationwide. The Ford designation "GP" did not stand for "General Purpose"; instead, supposedly the "G" signified government contract vehicle and "P" indicated the 80-inch wheelbase reconnaissance car. Ford may have chosen the letters "GP" because Bantam vehicles were already being called "jeeps", even in early 1941.

The first documented use of the word "Jeep" was the name of the character Eugene the Jeep in the Popeye comic strip, known for his supernatural abilities (e.g., walking through walls). It was also the name of a small tractor supplied to the U.S. Army by Minneapolis-Moline in 1937. Whatever the source, the name stuck and on February 13, 1943, Willys–Overland filed a trademark application on the use of the term "Jeep" with the U.S. Patent Office. After several denials by the patent office and appeals by Willys–Overland, the trademark "Jeep" was finally awarded to the company on June 13, 1950.

Willys also built 1292 airframes for the JB-2 Loon.

=== Postwar struggles ===
After the war, Willys did not resume production of its passenger-car models, choosing instead to concentrate on Jeeps and Jeep-based vehicles. The first postwar Willys product was the CJ-2A, an MB stripped of obviously military features, particularly the blackout lighting, and with the addition of a tailgate.

Willys initially struggled to find a market for the vehicle, first attempting to sell it primarily as an alternative to the farm tractor. Tractors were in short supply, having been out of production during the war. However, sales of the "Agri-Jeep" never took off, mainly because it was too light to provide adequate draft.

The CJ-2A was among the first civilian vehicles of any kind to be equipped with four-wheel drive from the factory, and it gained popularity among farmers, ranchers, hunters, and others who needed a lightweight vehicle for use on unimproved roads and trails.

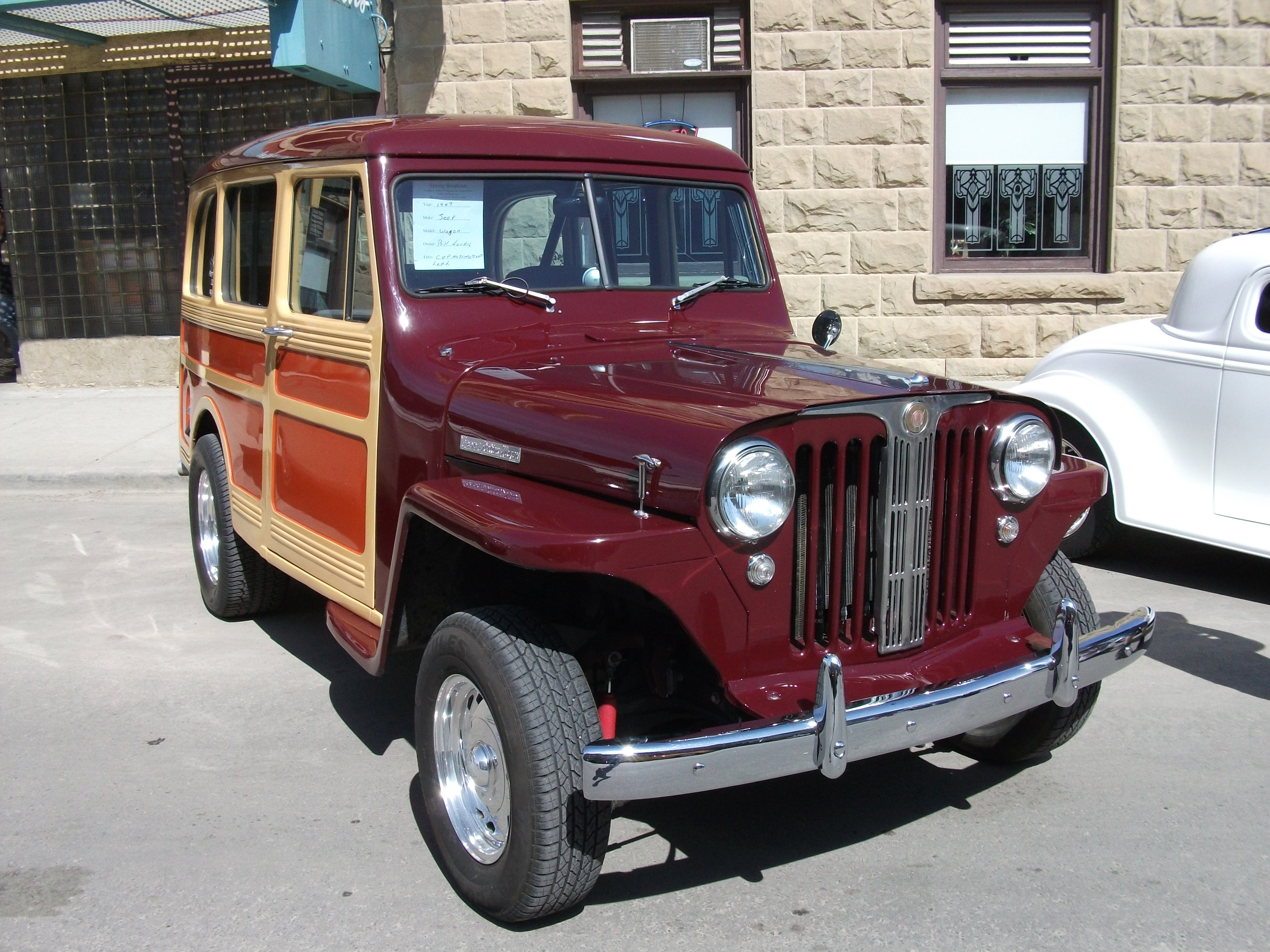
1947 Willys Jeep station wagon

In 1946, a year after the introduction of the CJ-2A, Willys produced the Willys "Jeep" Utility Wagon based on the same engine and transmission, with clear styling influence from the CJ-2A Jeep. The next year came a "Jeep" Utility Truck with four-wheel drive. In 1948, the wagon was available in four-wheel drive, making it the ancestor of all sport utility vehicles.

Willys planned to re-enter the passenger car market in 1947 with the Willys 6–70 sedan. Its name came from the fact it was powered by a 6-cylinder engine that produced 70 hp. The 6–70 was touted as the 'first stock car' in America that offered independent suspension on all four wheels, but it never entered production.

In 1948, under a contract from the U.S. Army, Willys produced a small one-man four-wheeled utility vehicle called the Jungle Burden Carrier which evolved into the M274 Utility 1/2-ton vehicle.

Willys later produced the M38 Jeep for the U.S. Army, and continued the CJ series of civilian Jeeps. One variation was the Jeepster, which came with a 4-cylinder or 6-cylinder engine, but only with two-wheel drive to the rear.

=== 1950s ===
In 1952, Willys re-entered the car market with a new compact car, the Willys Aero. At first available only as a two-door sedan, it was available with either an L-head or F-head six-cylinder engine. Export markets could get the Aero with a four-cylinder engine. A four-door sedan and a two-door hardtop were added for 1953 along with taxi models. The Aero cars were called Lark, Wing, Falcon, Ace, or Eagle depending on year, engine, and trim level, except for a small production run in its final year (1955) with models called Custom and Bermuda. The bodies for the Willys Aero were supplied by the Murray Body Corporation, which also made the bodies for the short-lived Hudson Jet. Also in 1952, CJ-3B Jeeps went into production. By 1968, over 155,000 were sold.

In 1953, Kaiser Motors purchased Willys–Overland and changed the company's name to Willys Motor Company. The same year, production of the Kaiser car was moved from Willow Run, Michigan, to the Willys plant at Toledo, Ohio. Although Jeep production was steady, sales of the Willys and Kaiser cars continued to fall.

=== The Brazilian era ===
Willys–Overland established its Brazilian operations in 1953, just before the Kaiser-Frazer takeover. The tooling for the Aero went to Brazil, where it entered production in 1960. In 1956–1957, Brazil's Executive Group for the Automotive Industry (GEIA) had approved Willys–Overland for production of the Aero, the Willys MB Jeep, a truck version of the Jeep called the Rural, and the French Renault Dauphine small car. Also, an abortive plan was made to create a company called Chrysler-Willys do Brasil SA to build the 1956 Plymouth Savoy and a Dodge truck there, in the hope of taking advantage of Willys' "Brazilian-made" credentials. Willys went through considerable effort to appear as a Brazilian company, even selling a large portion of their company to Brazilian stockholders to forestall a possible nationalist backlash, and to become eligible for various government incentives.

The little tail-engined Dauphine was a result of Kaiser's Renault connection, and was produced by Willys do Brasil from 1959 until 1968. Willys–Overland was one of the first companies to enter the Brazilian passenger automobile market, and their early entry originally paid off, with sales spiking in 1954 when Willys became the number-one selling car. Being distributed by the family of Getúlio Vargas' closest advisor Osvaldo Aranha also helped, and Willys–Overland reached a 52% share of Brazilian passenger car production in 1959. Willys held a market share of around 30% in Brazil from 1960 until 1966, its last full year as an independent, mostly Brazilian-owned company.

Willys entered the Brazilian market in the hope of offsetting their shrinking market and losses at home. However, unlike in the case of the Argentinian Kaiser operations, which were essentially developed around hand-me-downs, Willys built a very modern plant from the ground up in Brazil. The original promise was to build cars for export back to the United States, but such a situation never materialized. However, by late 1961, Brazilian-built Willys Jeeps began to be exported to Chile. Willys expanded into Brazil's impoverished northeast in the early 1960s, when they built an assembly plant for the Jeep in the state of Pernambuco.

In 1962, Willys started building the French Alpine A108 as the Willys Interlagos. It was produced until 1966 and was the first Brazilian-made sports car. It was also the car in which many Brazilian racers cut their teeth, including greats such as Emerson Fittipaldi. Willys also designed and showed a larger sports car called the "Capeta" (Devil) in 1964, powered by the 2.6-litre six-cylinder Aero engine. In 1965, Willys–Overland do Brasil and Renault began collaborating on a new front-wheel drive car, called "Project M" and meant to replace the aging Dauphine. Developed in parallel with the Renault 12, which it antedated, the car eventually saw light as the Ford Corcel. Early Corcels had "Willys" stamping in the glass, and the Corcel line (which continued in production until 1997 as the Ford Pampa) always showed its French origins in its characteristic three-bolt wheels. In 1967, Ford took a controlling interest in Kaiser and thereby gained control of Willys–Overland do Brasil.

The Aero-based Itamaraty continued in production until the early 1970s, in latter years wearing "Ford" badges. Dauphine production ended in 1968, but the Willys Rural/Pickup and its derivatives were built as the Ford F-75 until 1983. The only visual difference is that the post-1970 cars have a tailgate with "Ford" rather than "Jeep" stamped in it. The military version of the Jeep Pickup was called the F-85.

In America, the company had already changed its name in 1963 to Kaiser-Jeep Corporation; the Willys name disappeared thereafter.

== Legacy ==
Kaiser-Jeep was sold to American Motors Corporation (AMC) in 1970 when Kaiser Industries decided to leave the automobile business. After the sale, AMC used engines it had developed for its other cars in Jeep models to improve performance and standardize production and servicing.

Renault purchased a major stake in AMC in 1979 and took over operation of the company, producing the CJ series until 1986. Chrysler purchased AMC in 1987 after the CJ had already been replaced with the Jeep Wrangler (also known as the YJ and later TJ). The Jeep marque, owned by DaimlerChrysler and later Fiat S.p.A. and Stellantis, produces Jeep vehicles at a new Toledo Complex.

DaimlerChrysler introduced the Overland name for a trim package on the 2002 Jeep Grand Cherokee. The badging is a recreation of the Overland nameplate from the early twentieth century.

In 2014, the Willys trademark was acquired by Italian Carrozzeria Viotti, declaration of Emanuele Bomboi (head of design of Viotti). Carrozzeria Viotti together with Fabbrica Italiana Maggiora introduced at the Bologna Motor Show 2014 the Willys AW 380 Berlineta, a concept car inspired by the original Willys Interlagos assembled by Willys in Brazil under license of the French Alpine. Viotti and Maggiora plans to produce the vehicle in limited edition and relaunch the Willys marque.

Stellantis reintroduced the Willys name as a trimline for the Jeep Gladiator pickup truck in the early 2020s.

== Racing ==
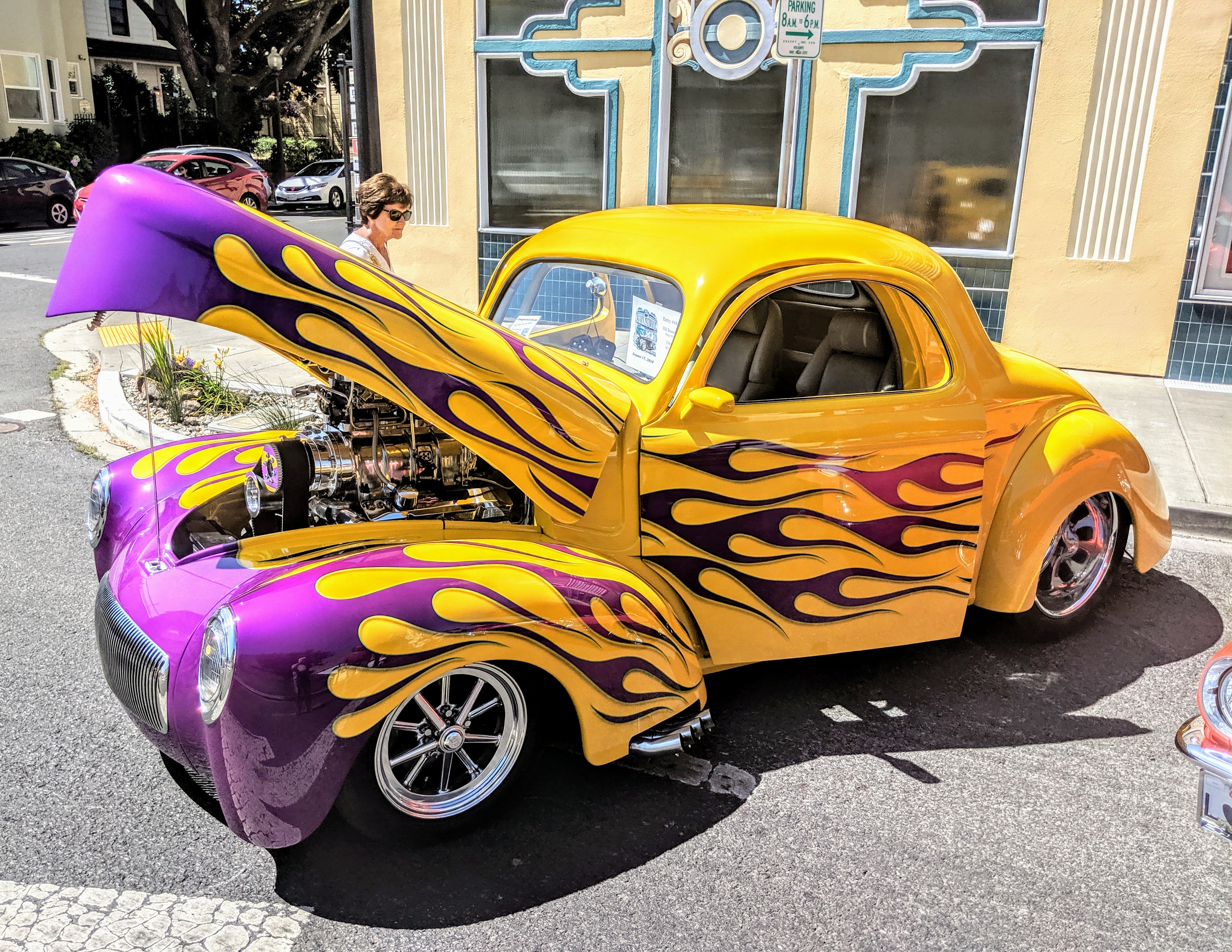
A Willys hot rod with flamed paint job

The 1933–1936 coupés and pickups were very popular gassers. The best-known would be the 1933 Willys 77. Only 12,800 were sold in 1933, 13,234 in 1934, 10,644 in 1935 (including a new panel delivery), and 30,825 the company's final year, making it a puzzle why it became popular: it was neither cheap nor plentiful.

After the company revived, the 1937–1942 coupés, sedans, and pickups were again popular with hot rodders and gasser teams, and again, comparatively low production leaves unexplained why they gained so much attention. Ollie Olsen's Wil-A-Meaner 1940 coupé (driven by Bob "Rapid" Dwyer) won the 1961 NHRA Nationals A/G title.

== List of vehicles ==
=== Willys ===
- Willys 77 (1933–1936)
- Willys Four
- Willys Six
- Willys-Six C-113 truck (1931–1932)
- Willys Eight
- Willys-Knight (1914–1933)
- Willys Americar (1940–1942)
- Willys Sedan 1940–194?
- Stearns-Knight
- Willys Aero
- Marion 10
- also many early cars with model numbers

=== Overland ===
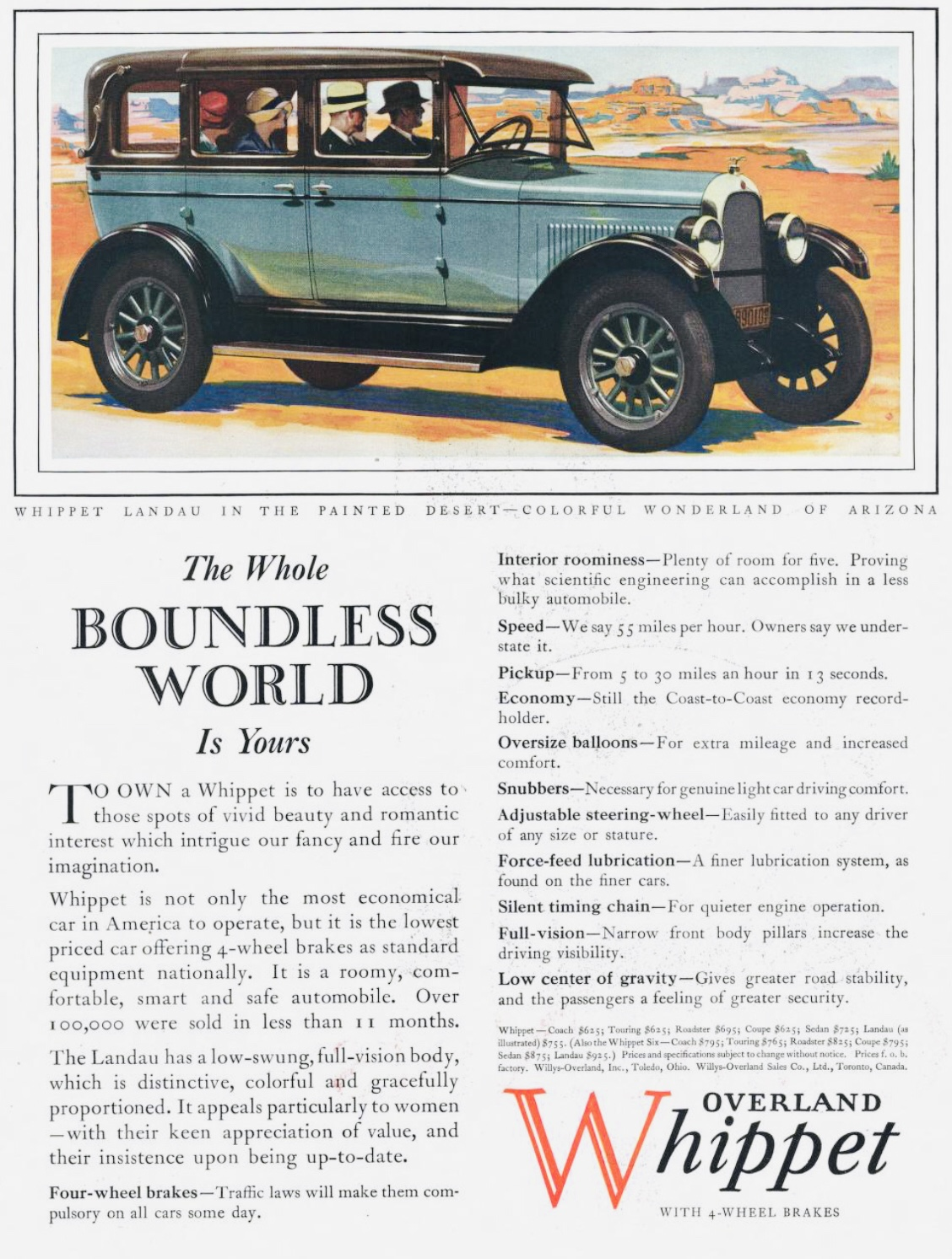
Overland Whippet (1926–1931)

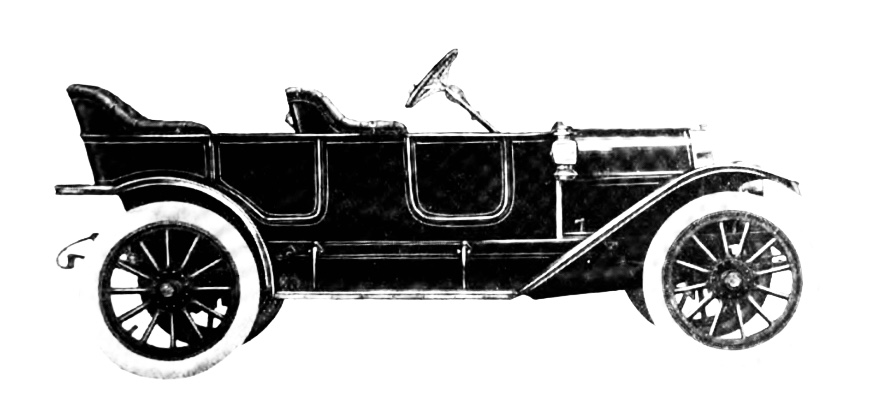
Willys Overland Model 59 (1912)

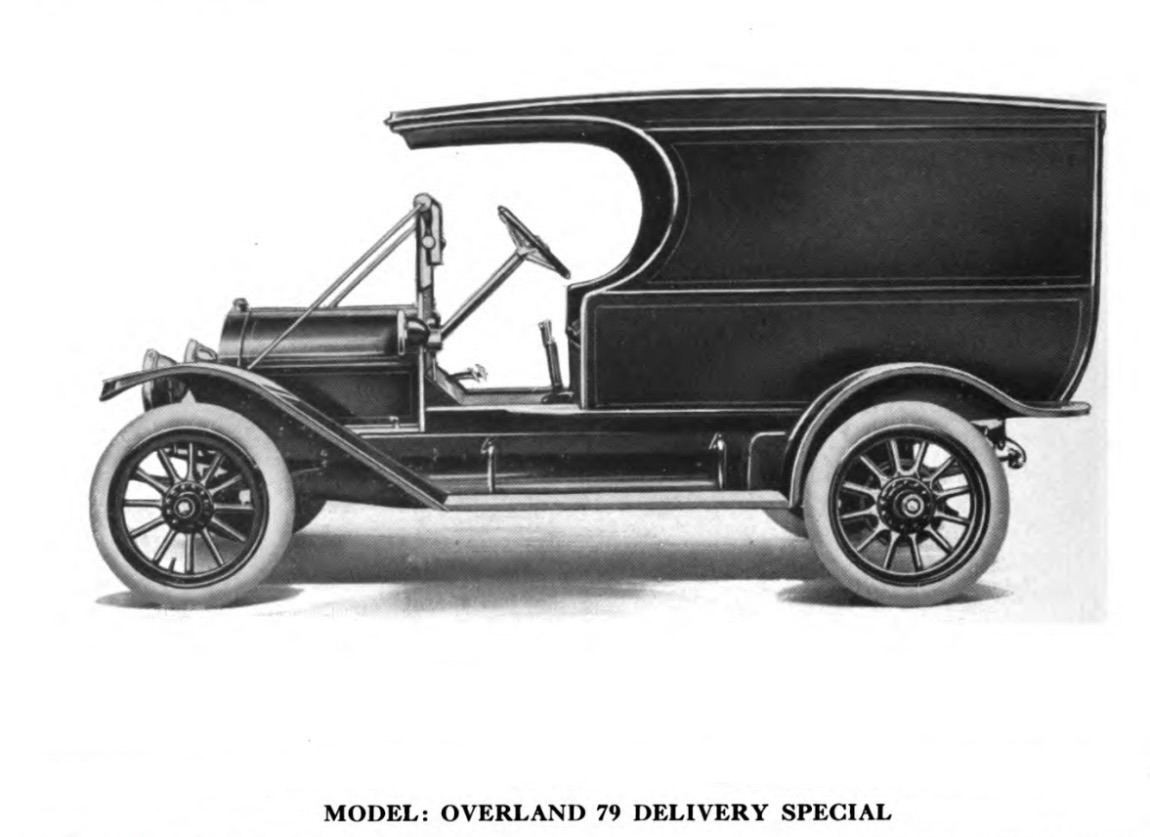
Willys Overland Model 79 (1914) 0,4 t

File Discussion Read Edit View history

- Baby Overland
- Overland Whippet(1926–1931)
- Overland Four
- Overland Six
- Overland 39
- Overland 38
- Overland 40
- Overland 41
- Overland 42
- Overland 59t (1911–1912)
- Overland 61 (1912)
- Overland 69-T
- Overland 69-R
- Overland 69-F
- Overland 69-Coupe
- Overland 71-T
- Overland 71-R
- Overland 71-F
- Overland 79
- Overland 83
- Overland 90
- Overland 91
- Overland 93 (1925-1927)
- also many early cars with model number

=== Aero-Willys ===
- Aero-Willys JT (1951)
- Aero-Willys Wing (1952)
- Aero-Willys Scout (1953)
- Aero-Willys Lark (1952–1954)
- Aero-Willys Ace (1952–1954)
- Aero-Willys Falcon (1953)
- Aero-Willys Eagle (1952–1954)
- Aero-Willys 2600 (1963)
- (1960–1969 with Ford of Brazil)
- Aero Willys (Brooks Stevens´design)

=== Willys–Overland ===
- Willys-Overland Jeepster, 1948–1951, 19,132 built (Toledo, Ohio built)
- Willys Dauphine (1959–1965), licensed from Renault, 23,887 produced (Brazil)
- Willys Gordini (1962–1968), a more powerful Dauphine, licensed from Renault, 41,045 produced (Brazil)
- Aero-Willys (1960–1971), 99,621 produced (Brazil)
- Willys Itamaraty (1966–1971), 17,216 produced (Brazil)
- Willys Interlagos (1961–1966), licensed from Renault/Alpine, 822 produced (Brazil)
- Willys Itamaraty Executivo (limousine) (1966–1969), 27 produced (Brazil)
- Willys–Overland Crossley (United Kingdom)

=== Jeeps ===
- Willys MA (original Jeep concept)
- Willys MB (1941–1945), 335,531 produced
- Willys CJ-2 (1944–1945)
- Willys CJ-2A (1946–1949)
- Willys Wagon (1946–1965), 300,000 produced
- Willys CJ-3A (1949–1953), 132,000 produced
- Willys Pickup (1947–1965), 200,000 produced
- Willys Jeep FC (1956–1965), 30,000 produced
- Willys M38 (1951–1952), 61,423 produced
- Willys CJ-3B (1952–1968), 155,000 produced
- Willys M38A1 (1952–1957)
- Willys CJ-5, later Jeep CJ5 (1954–1983), 600,000 produced
- Rural Jeep (1960–1969) or Ford Rural (1970–1977) (Brazil)
- Willys Jeep Pickup (1960–1969) or Ford F-75 (1970–1983) (Brazil)
- Willys Corvo (1977–1977) (Chile)

== Body type designations ==
- Bermuda – hardtop designation, 1955

== Gallery ==
=== Advertisements ===
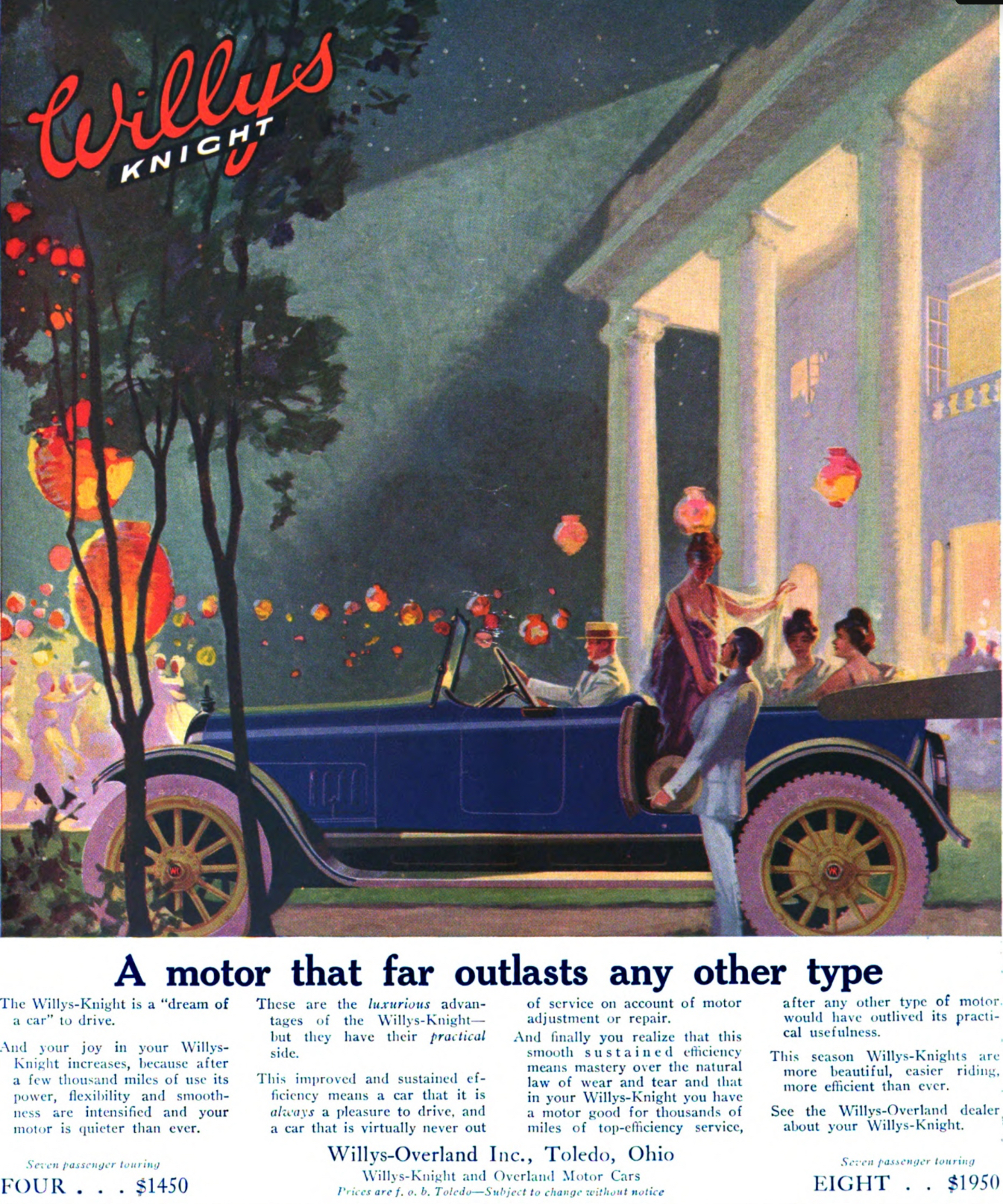
Willys Knight (1917)

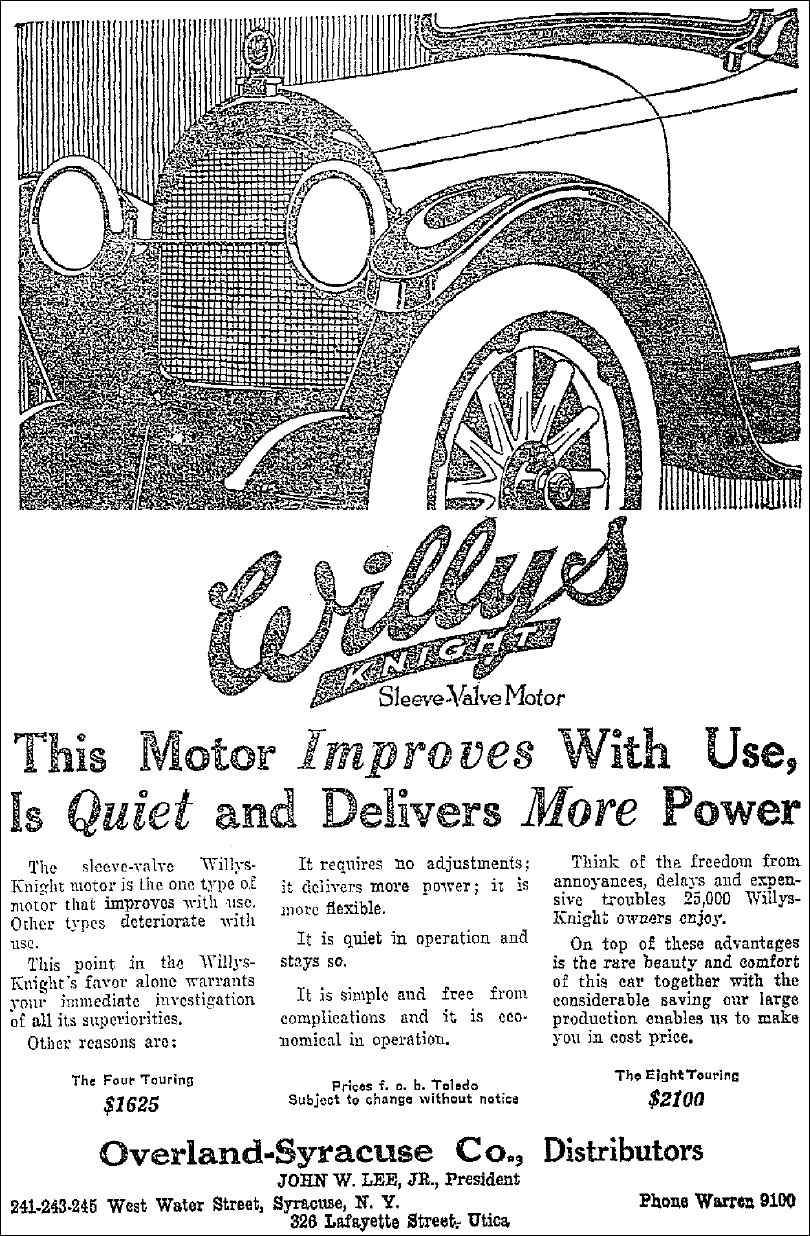
A 1918 Willys Knight advertisement – "Sleeve Valve Motor" – Syracuse Herald, May 8, 1918

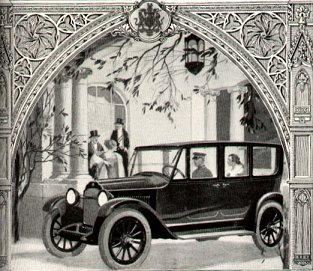
1920 Willys–Knight advertisement

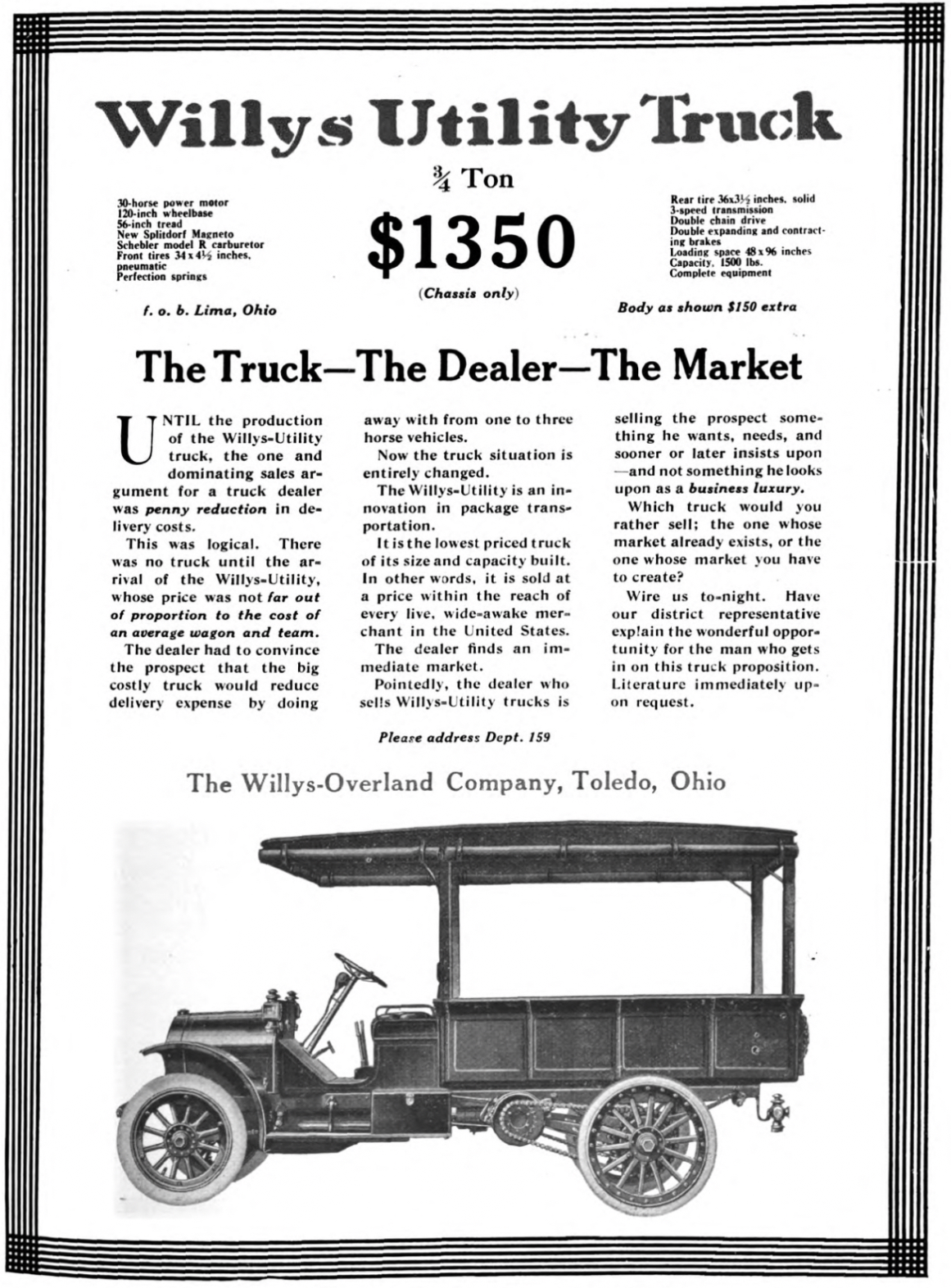
Willys–Overland 0.75 t (1914) advertisement

=== Vehicles ===
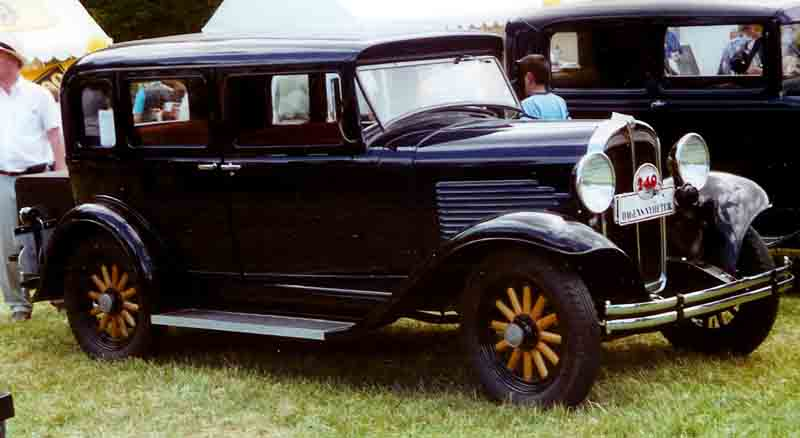
Willys Six 97 4-Door Sedan 1931

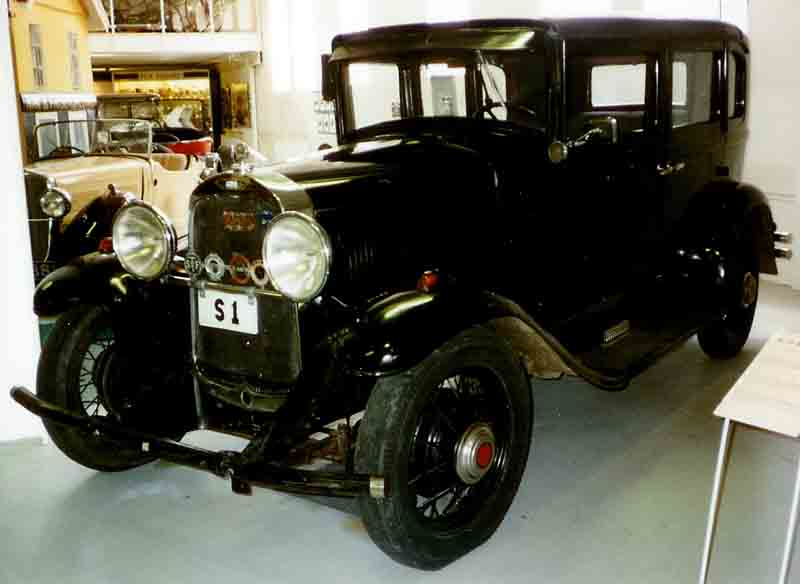
Willys Six 4-Door Sedan 1931

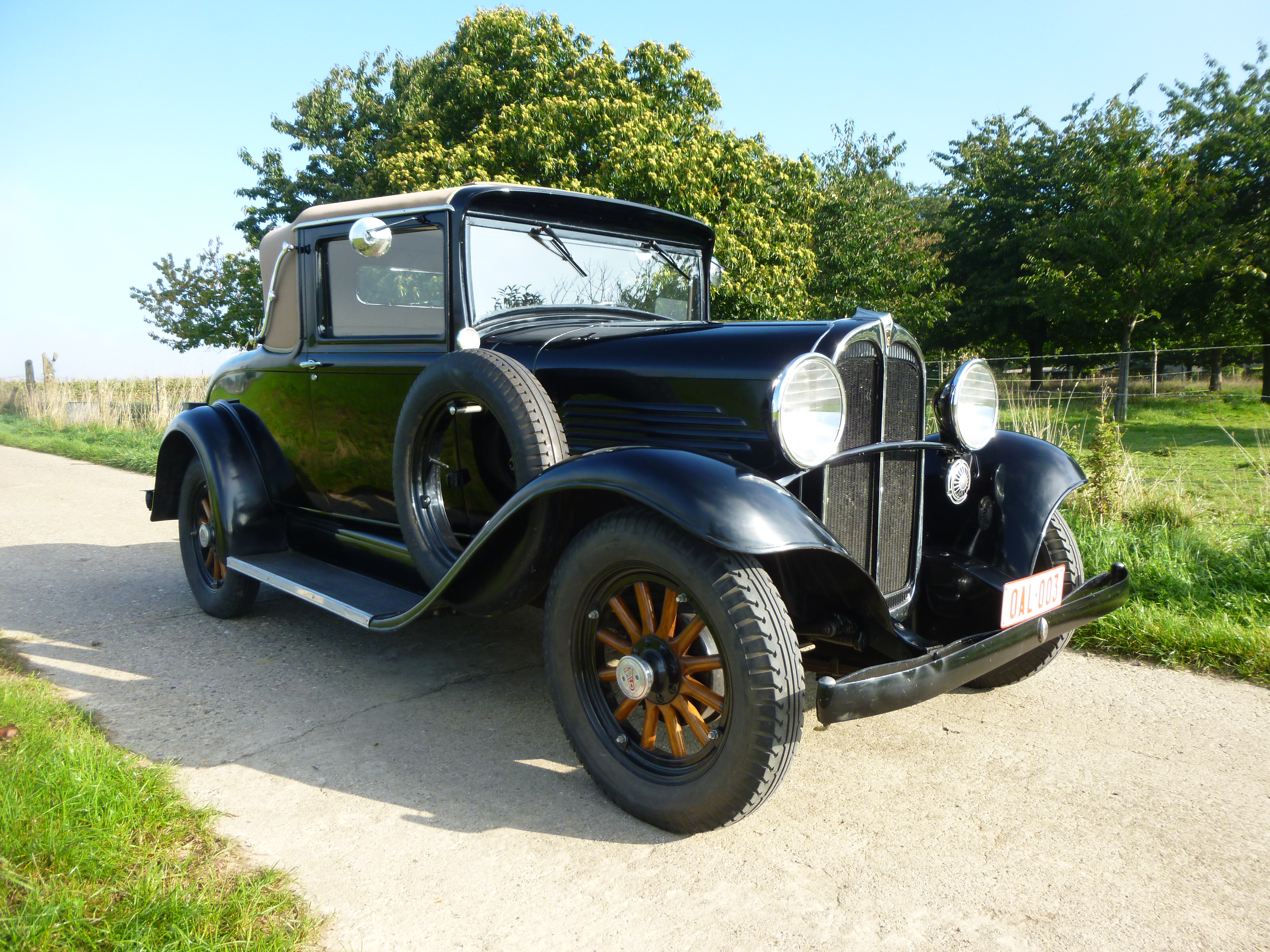
Willys 6 1931 Sport Coupe

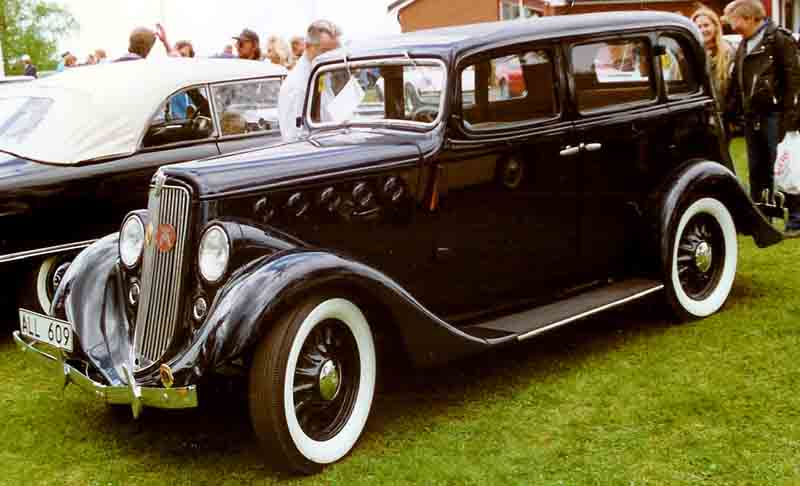
Willys 77 4-Door Sedan 1936

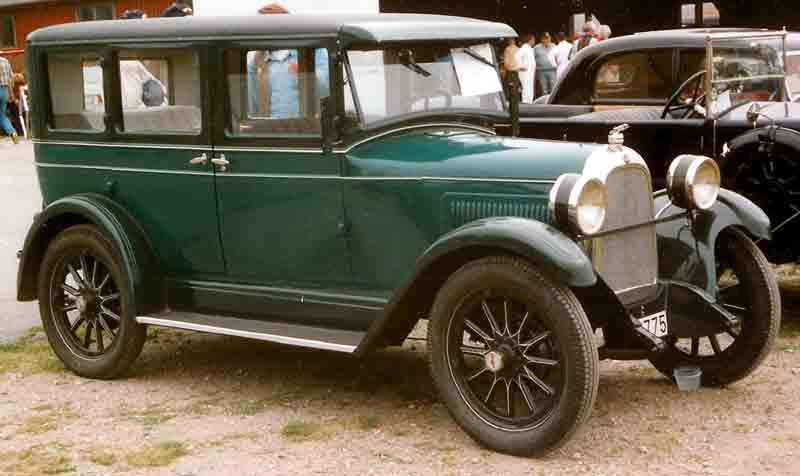
Whippet 4-Door Sedan

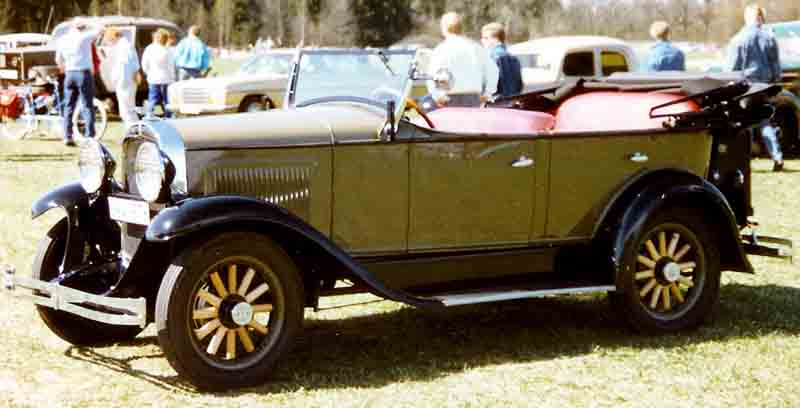
Whippet Model 96A Touring 1929

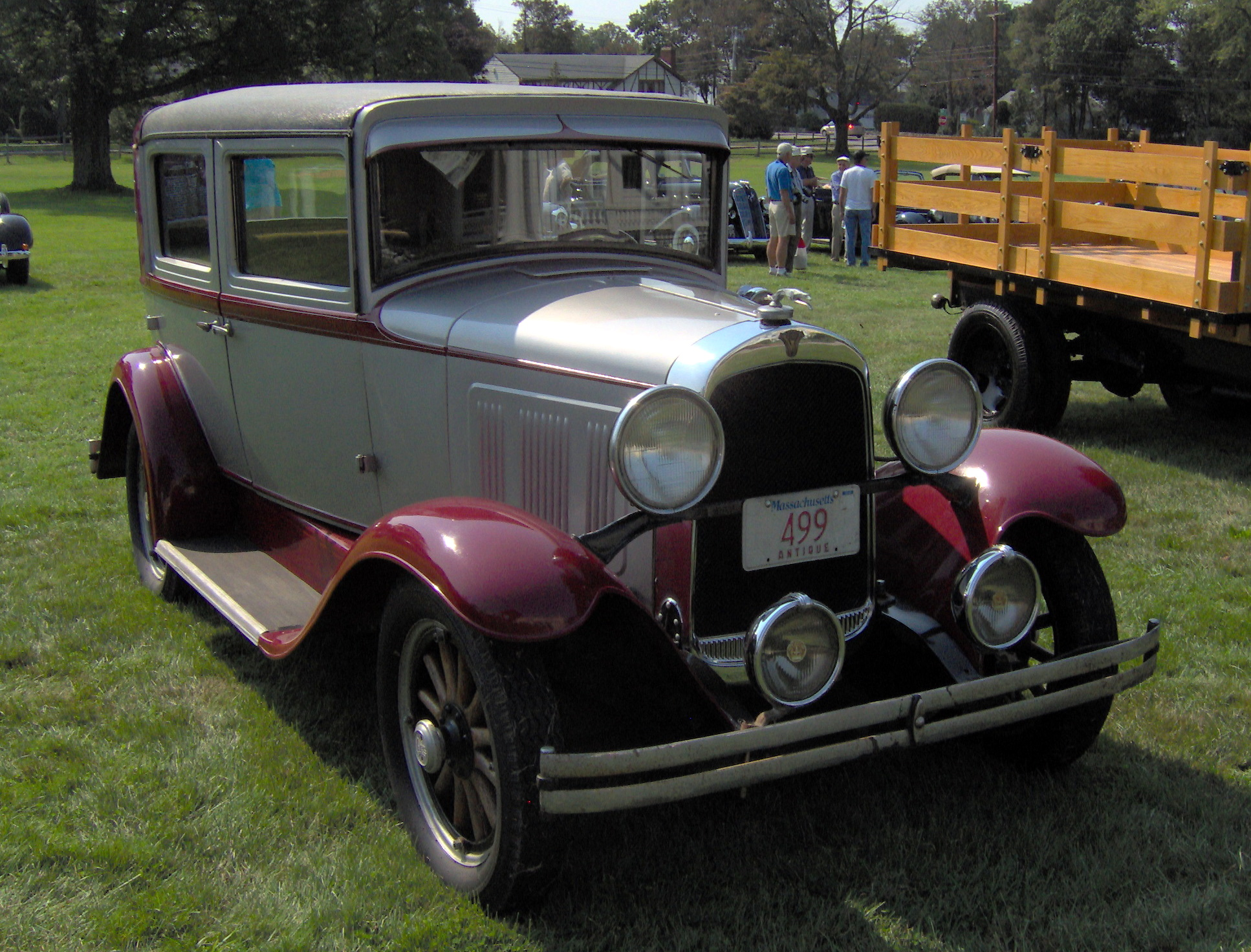
1930 Whippet 96A sedan

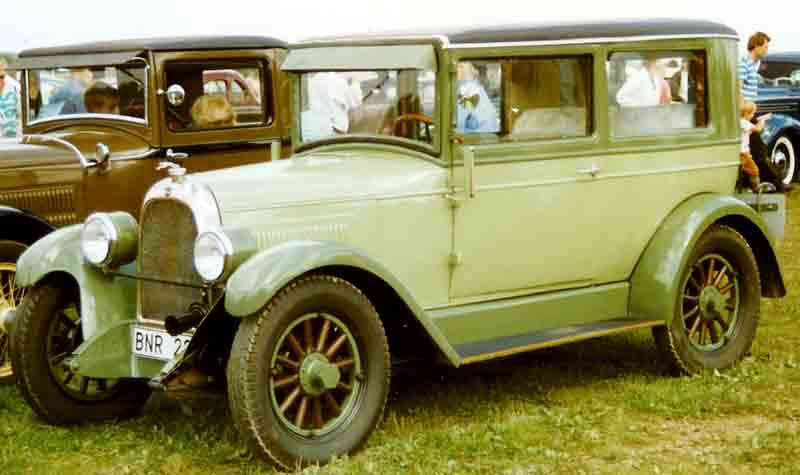
Whippet Model 96 Coach 1927

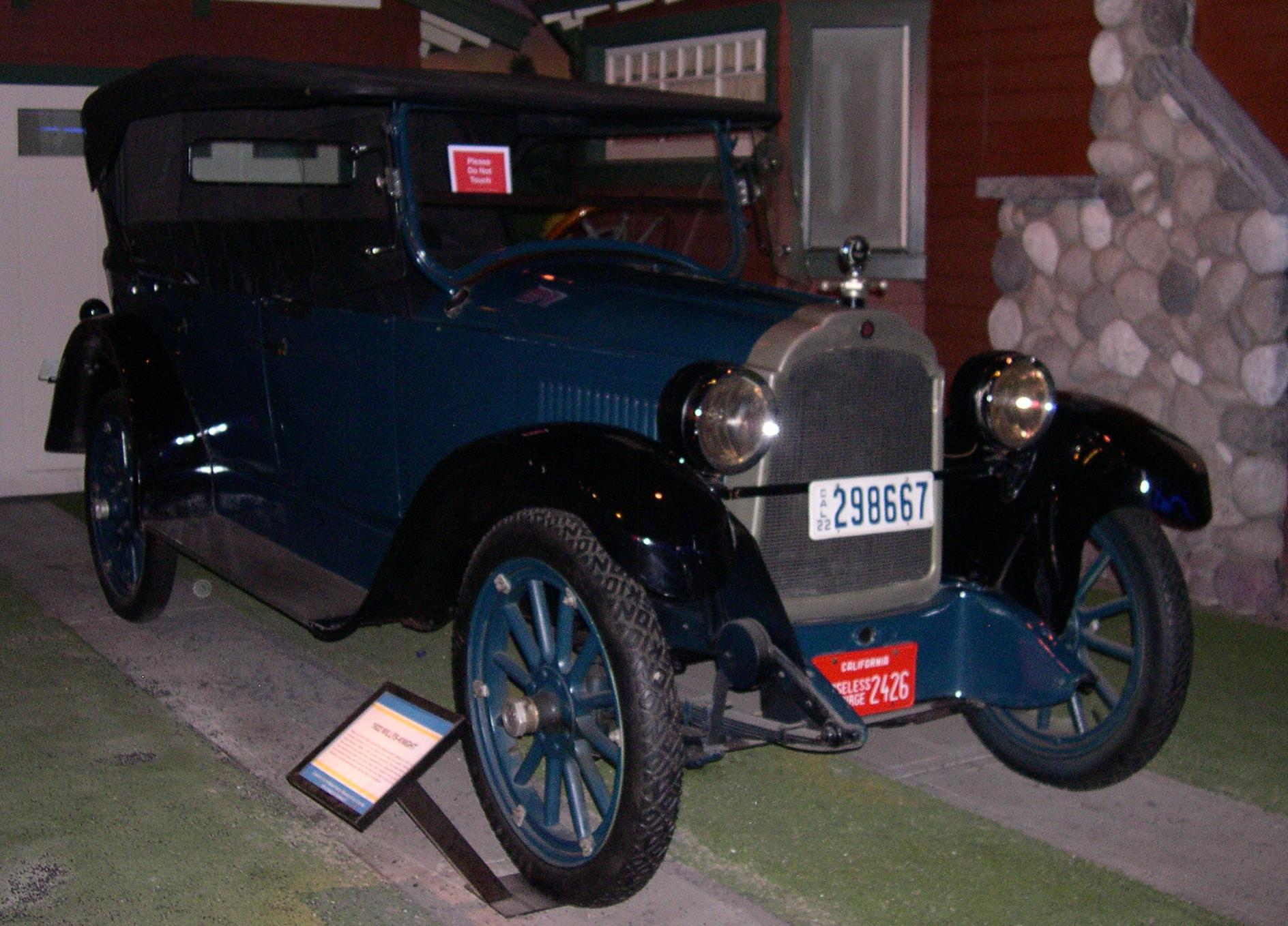
1922 Willys-Knight Model 20 in the Petersen Automotive Museum

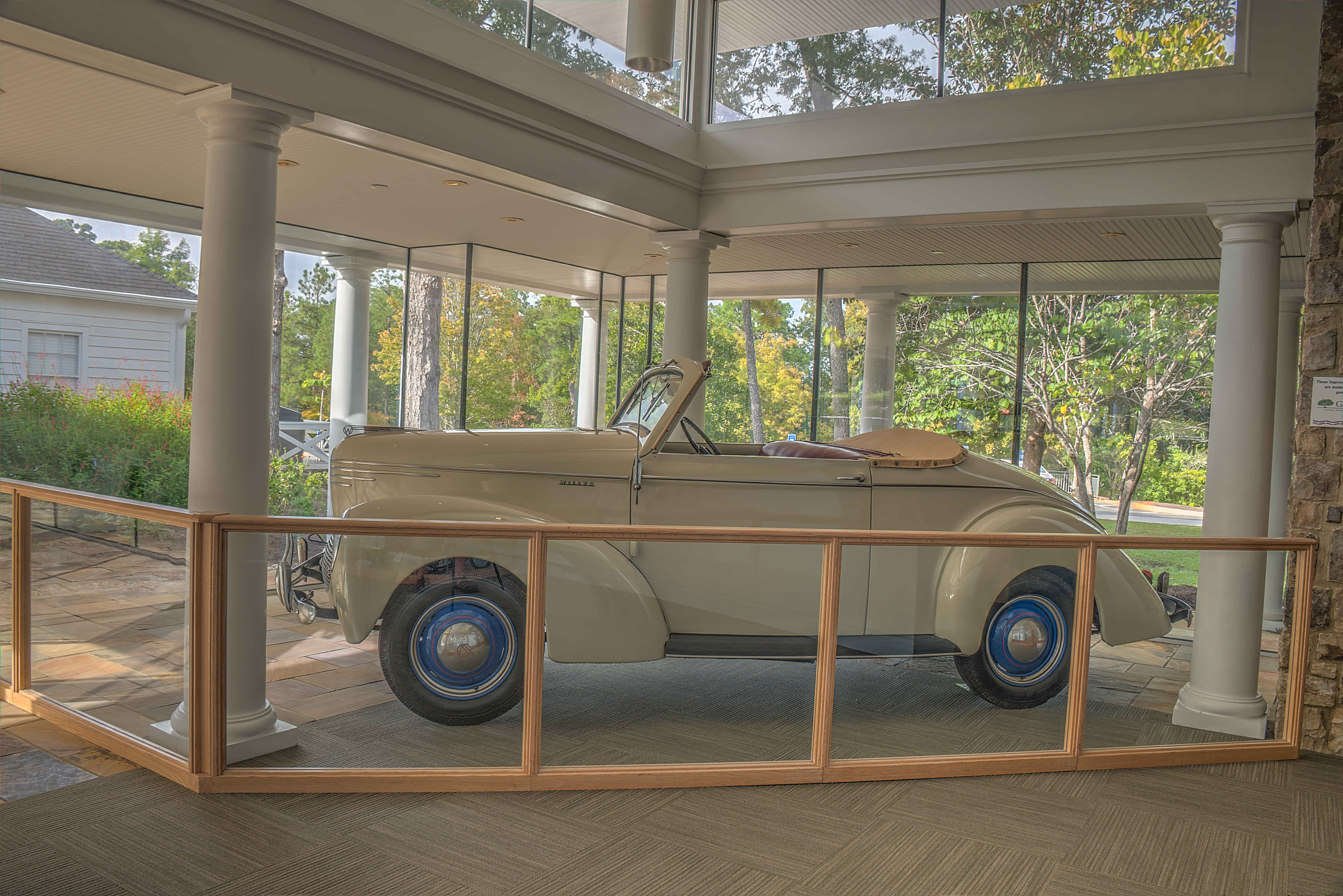
Custom-built 1940 Willys roadster on display at the Little White House

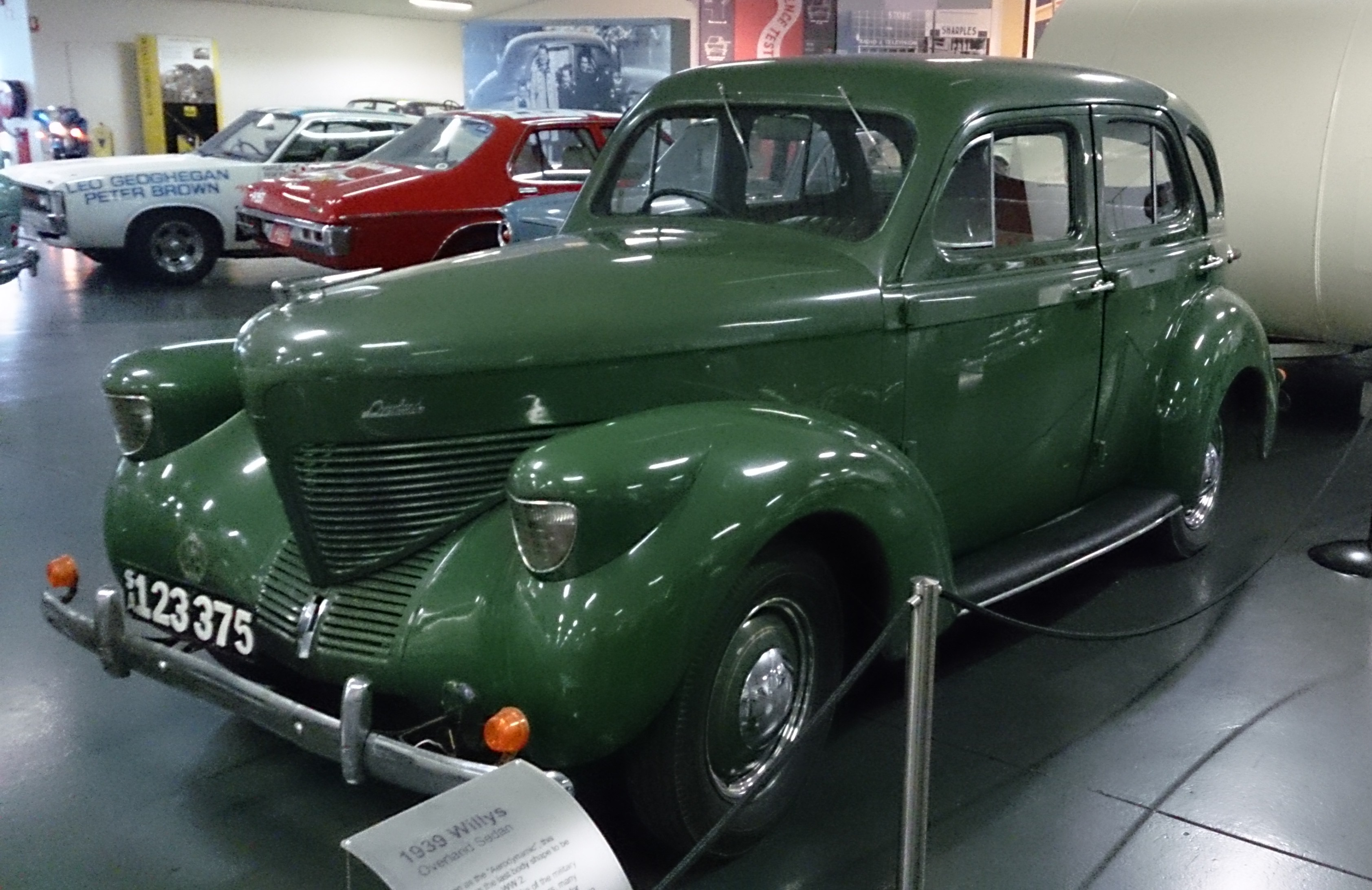
Willys Overland 4-Door Sedan (Model 39) 1939. This example has a body built in Australia by Holden that differs from the American model in having an additional window behind the rear door.
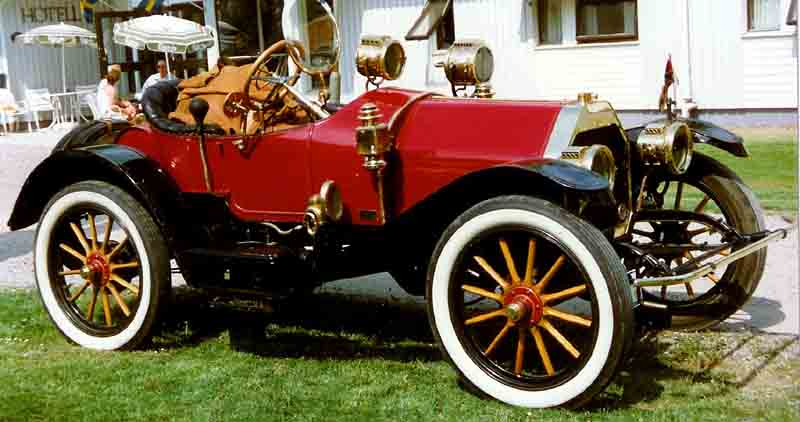
Overland Model 38 Roadster 1910

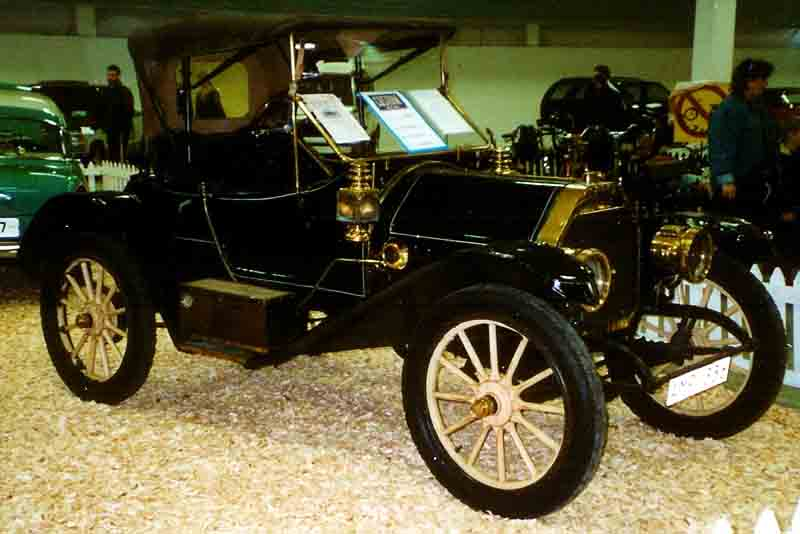
Overland Model 46 Torpedo Roadster 1911

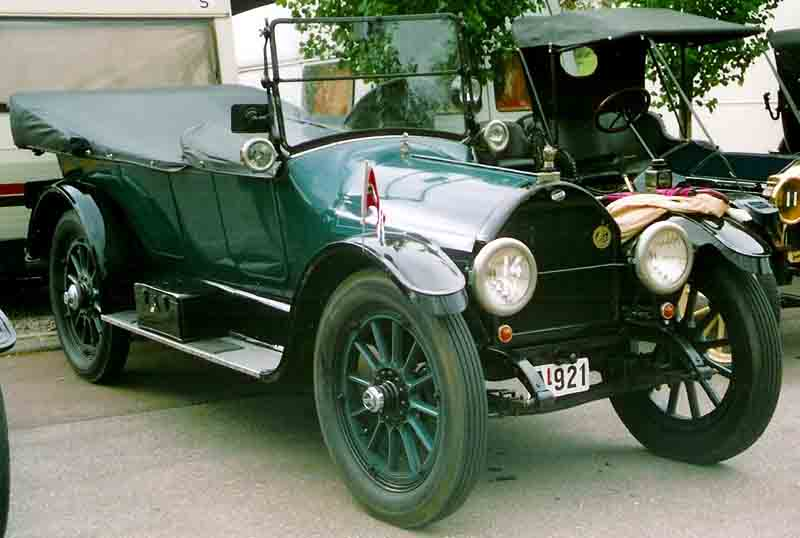
Overland Model 82 Touring 1915

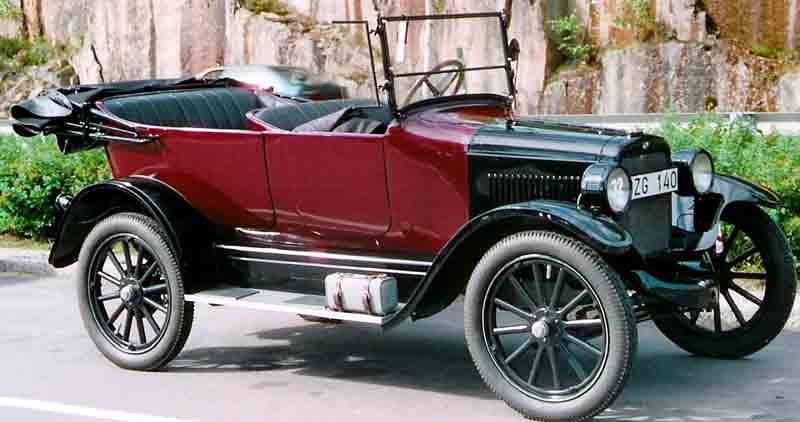
Overland Model 91 Touring 1922

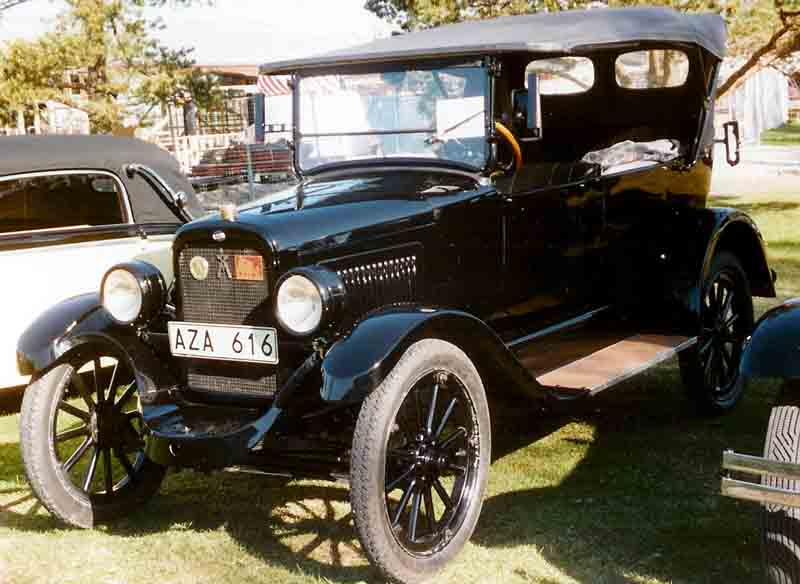
Overland Model 91 Touring 1923
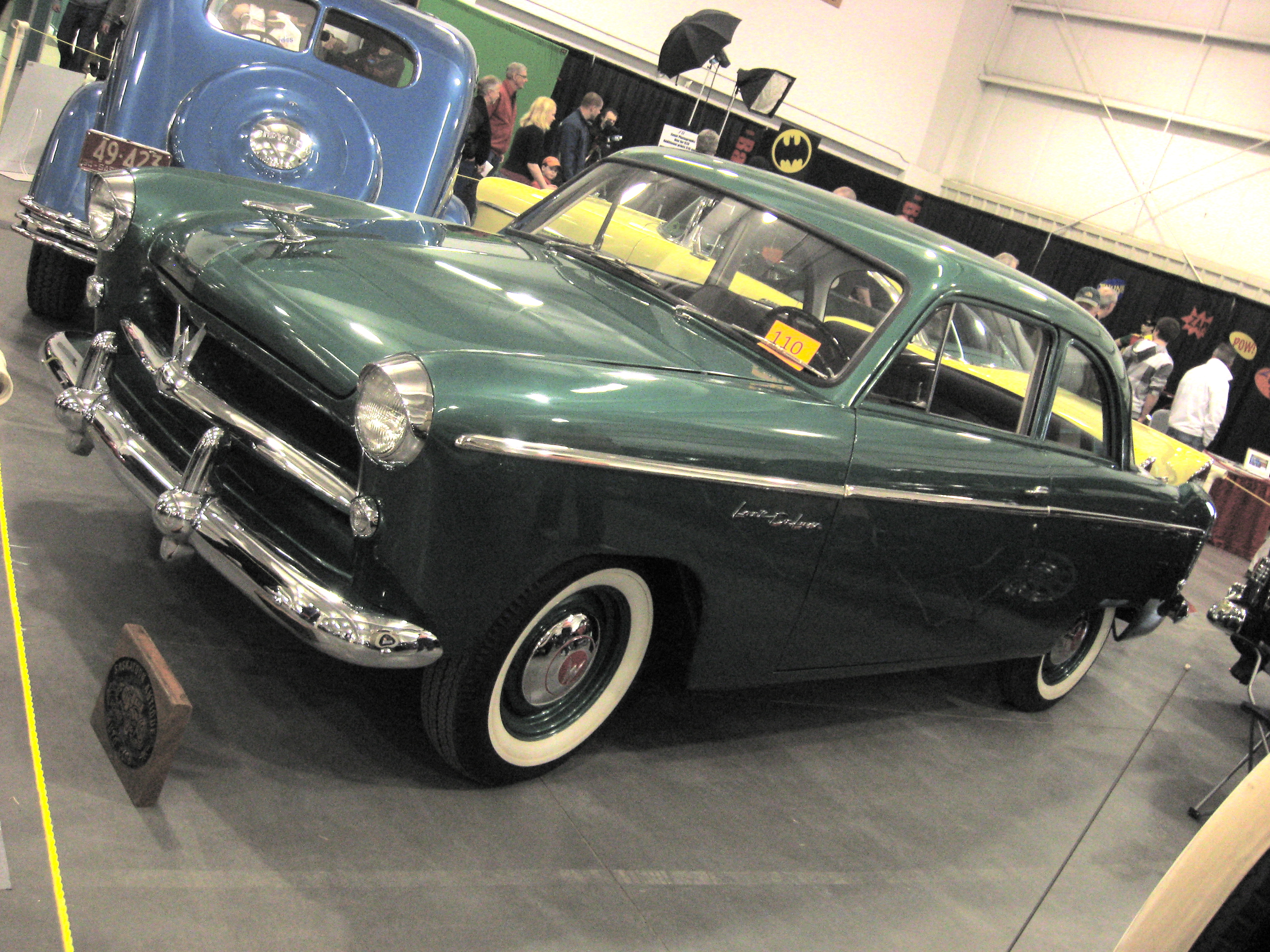
Aero-Willys

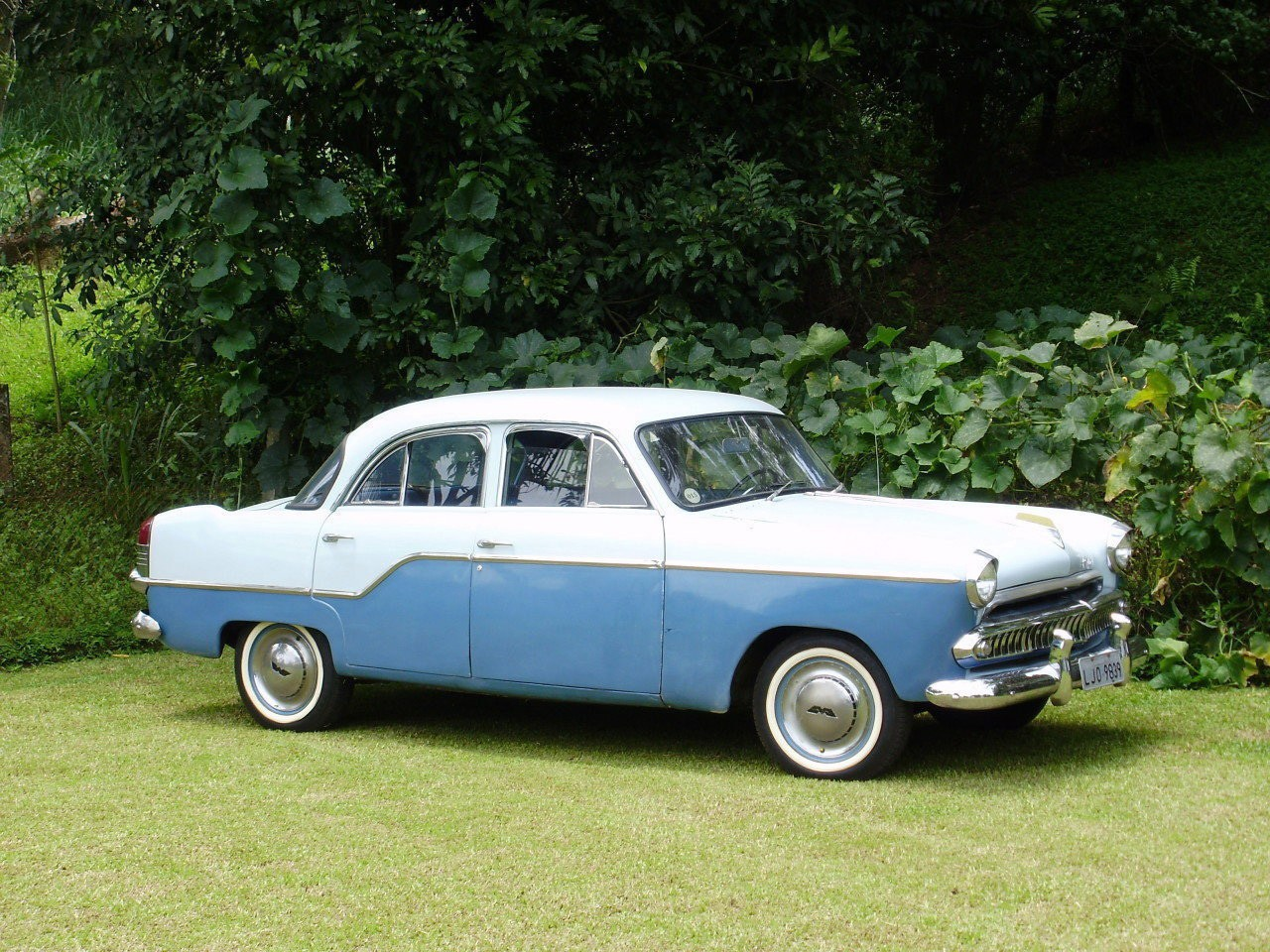
Brazilian made Aero-Willys 1960

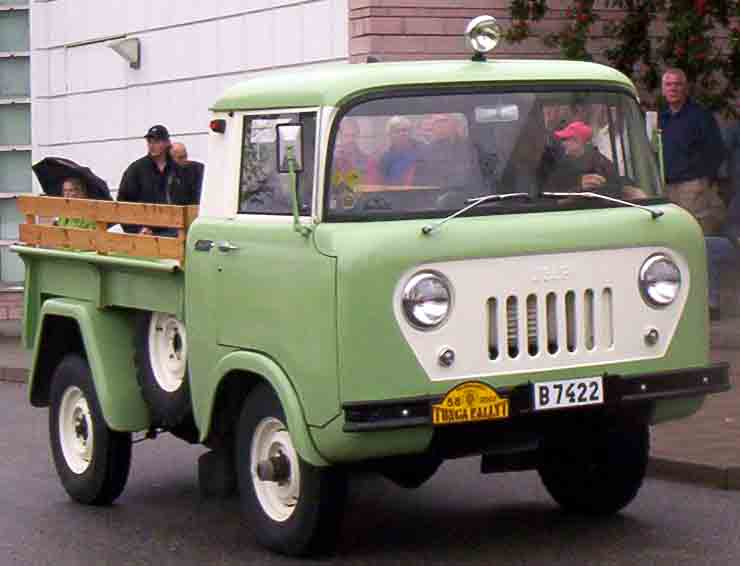
Willys FC150 Truck 1963
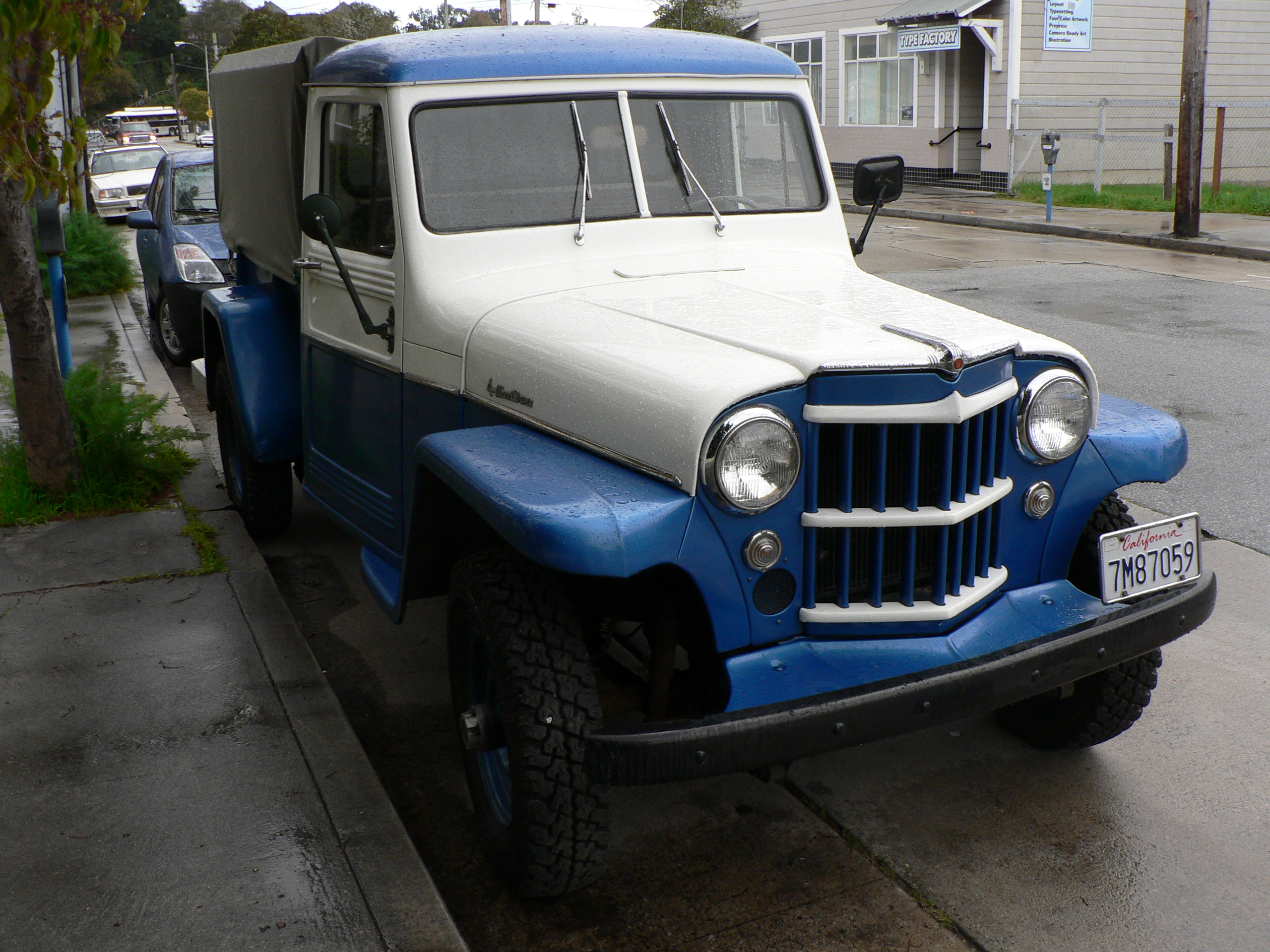
1957 Willys pickup (four-wheel drive)

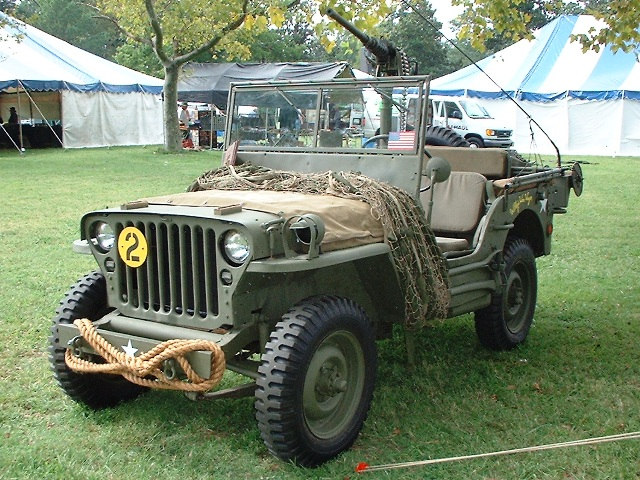
A Willys MB, better known as Jeep, at Military Vehicle Show, War Memorial Museum, Newport News, Virginia, September 24, 2006

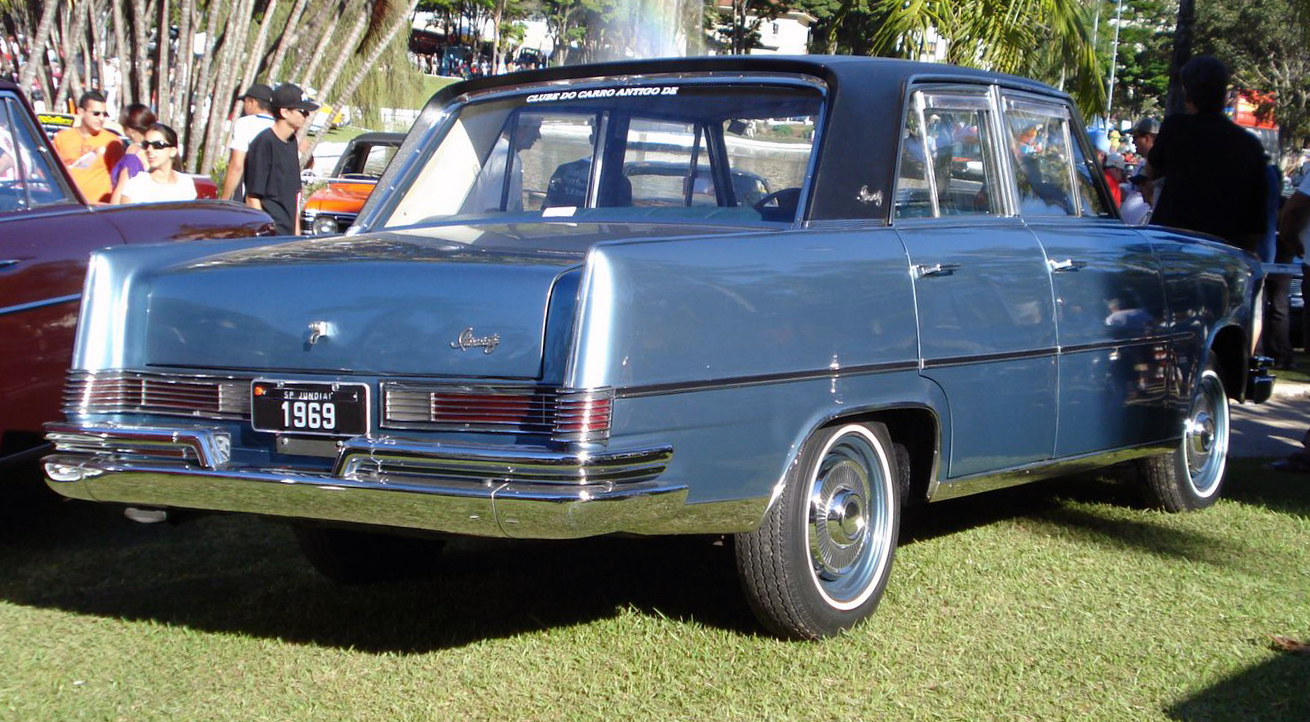
1969 Willys Ford Itamaraty

== See also ==
- Carl Breer
- List of defunct automobile manufacturers
