= Willys 77 =

American car

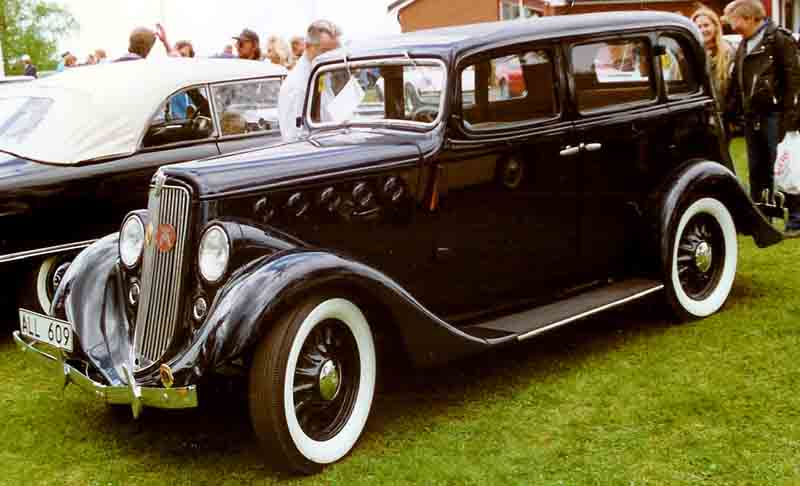
Willys 77 4-door sedan, 1936

The Willys 77 was an American car sold from 1933 to 1942 by Willys–Overland in Toledo, Ohio. It was a successor to the Willys Whippet.

Willys–Overland went into receivership the same year the 77 was introduced.

The car had a 145 cu in (2,380 cc) four-cylinder engine in the front, which produced 48 hp (36 kW; 49 PS). The wheelbase was 100 in (2,500 mm) and the car was sold at a price below US$500, making it the cheapest American car of its era. The car delivered 25 miles per gallon.

The 77 had a top speed of 65 mph (105 km/h), which made it a popular base for equipping a racing car. A tuned-up Willys 77 achieved an average speed of 65.2 mph (104.9 km/h) in the 24-hour race on the Muroc Dry Lake.

In the years leading up to the United States's participation in World War II the model range was continued under the names Willys 37, Willys 38, Willys 48, Willys Speedway and Willys Americar.

Production was discontinued in 1942.

== Racing ==
The 1933–1936 Willys coupés and pickups were very popular gassers. The best-known would be the 1933 Model 77. Only 12,800 were sold in 1933, 13,234 in 1934, 10,644 in 1935 (including a new panel delivery), and 30,825 the company's final year.
