= Joseph W. Frazer =

American automobile company executive

Joseph Washington Frazer
- Born: March 4, 1892; Nashville, Tennessee, US
- Died: August 7, 1971 (aged 79); Newport, Rhode Island, US
- Education: Yale University
- Occupation: Industrialist
- Spouse: Margaret Frost
- Relatives: George Washington

Joseph Washington Frazer (March 4, 1892 – August 7, 1971) was a mid-20th century American automobile company executive. Over the course of his life Frazer was employed in half a dozen different companies as a mechanic, instructor, financier, salesman, president and board chairman. He held down top executive positions in Chrysler, Willys-Overland, and Graham-Paige, before partnering with Henry J. Kaiser to form the Kaiser-Frazer Corporation. He was an important figure in the classic era of American car building.

== Early life ==
Frazer was born March 4, 1892, in Nashville, Tennessee. He was the son of James Stokes Frazer, an attorney and judge, and Mary Washington. Frazer's mother traced her lineage to an uncle of George Washington.

== Education ==
Frazer graduated from The Hotchkiss School in Lakeville, Connecticut, and studied engineering at Yale University's Sheffield Scientific School in New Haven, Connecticut, and graduated with a science degree in 1911.

== Early career ==
Frazer joined his brother's Packard dealership in Nashville as a mechanic's assistant. He then switched to selling new cars at the dealership and subsequently at another Packard franchise in New York City. He then moved to Cleveland and operated a sales office for the Saxon. Frazer was then hired by General Motors, where his understanding of purchase loans made him a key organizer of GMAC. On loan from GM's executive staff, he established a similar lending arm for Pierce-Arrow Motor Car Company.

== Chrysler ==
Frazer first met Walter P. Chrysler in 1923 at Maxwell Chalmers. Chrysler was aware of Frazer's growing reputation in the business as a thinker who made large-scale sales possible. Frazer joined Chrysler and, with him on board, Maxwell tripled its annual sales, helping Chrysler obtain the resources build his own car. In 1925 Chrysler founded the Chrysler Corporation. Frazer suggested to Chrysler that the company build a low-priced car that would directly challenge Ford and GM. Frazer suggested calling the car "Plymouth". "Why not call it Plymouth? That's a good old American name. Ever hear of Plymouth Binder Twine?" While others were unimpressed by Frazer's proposition, Chrysler (himself once a farmer) replied, "Every farmer in America knows about Plymouth Binder Twine. Let's give them a name they're familiar with." On January 11, 1928, the first car was produced and later it shared some of the styling and features of Chrysler and DeSoto. By 1931 the car was ranked third in automobile sales in the U.S.

== Willys-Overland ==
In 1939, Frazer left Chrysler and by this time, the company was already one of the Big Three automobile manufacturers in the United States with an annual revenue of $550 million. He moved to Willys-Overland which was in dire financial straits with sales stalled at 16,000 units annually. During his time at Willys the company built and unveiled its new military vehicle, where Frazer approved trademark filings to make "Jeep" an automotive nameplate. Frazer claimed to have coined the word "jeep" by slurring the initials G.P. but this is disputed. Willys won the U.S. Government contract to build the Jeep ["General Purpose" - ("G.P.") military utility vehicle]. Jeep began production in 1940–1941. Frazer also directed the development of a low-priced car called the Willys Americar which was a sales success. By the time he left in 1944 Willys-Overland had yearly sales of $212 million.

== Graham-Paige Motors ==
In August 1944 Frazer took control of Graham-Paige Motors Corporation and became president. He announced that the company would resume manufacturing automobiles after the war with a completely new car to be called the Frazer. While seeking financial backing for this venture, he met industrialist Henry J. Kaiser, who also had plans for a postwar automobile. The two formed the Kaiser-Frazer Corporation on July 25, 1945. Henry Kaiser became the chairman of Kaiser-Frazer, and Frazer became president. Kaiser-Frazer Corporation and Graham-Paige became equal partners. Kaiser-Frazer would make the Kaiser car, Graham-Paige would build the Frazer and agricultural machinery.

By the end of 1946, Graham-Paige was losing money, and was unable to meet its financial obligations to Kaiser-Frazer and in 1947, Frazer sold Graham-Paige's automobile operation to Kaiser. He retained the farm equipment division which he moved to a plant in York, Pennsylvania.

== Personal life ==
Joseph married Margaret "Lucille" Frost on November 18, 1914. They had one daughter Arielle (born August 23, 1917 – died February 7, 2006, in Newport, Rhode Island).

He was featured in a "Time" Magazine article in April, 1945 in an article entitled "From Riches to Riches."

In April 2012, Frazer was inducted into the Automobile Hall of Fame.

He died of cancer at his home in Newport on August 7, 1971.
