= DeSoto Airflow =

Series SE/SG/S-2
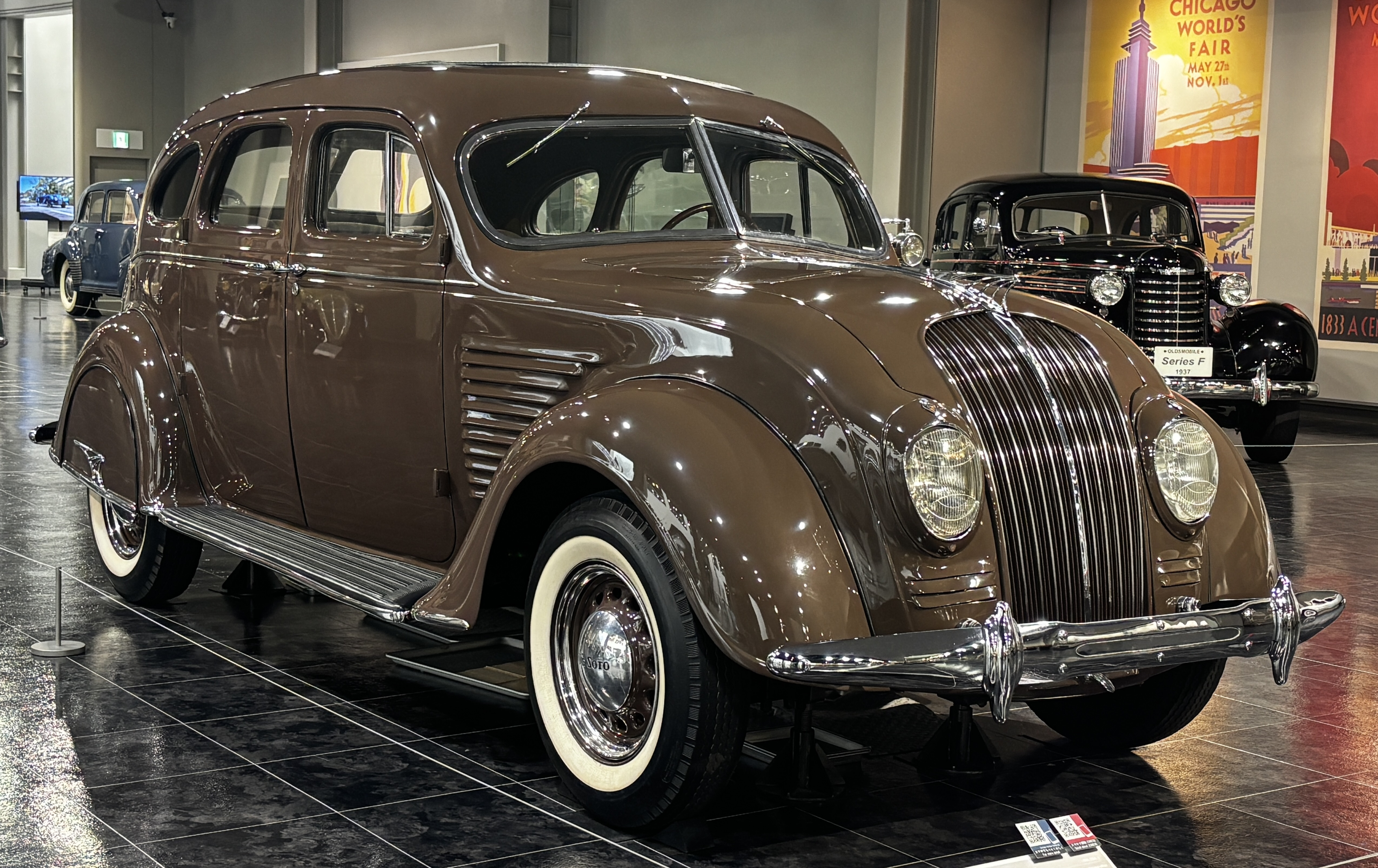
- 1934 DeSoto Airflow sedan

Overview
- Manufacturer: DeSoto (Chrysler)
- Also called: Chrysler Airflow Six Series CY (Canada)
- Production: 1933–1936
- Model years: 1934–1936
- Assembly: Los Angeles (Maywood) Assembly; Highland Park Chrysler Plant
- Designer: Oliver Clark

Body and chassis
- Class: Full-size
- Body style: 2-door coupe 4-door sedan
- Layout: FR layout
- Related: Chrysler Imperial; Chrysler Airflow; Chrysler Airstream; DeSoto Airstream

Powertrain
- Engine: 241.5 cu in (4.0 L) Chrysler I6
- Transmission: 3-speed manual

Dimensions
- Wheelbase: 115.5 in (2,934 mm)

The DeSoto Airflow is a full-sized automobile built by DeSoto during model years 1934, 1935 and 1936. DeSoto produced the then-revolutionary Airflow model due to its price structure relationship with the larger and more expensive Chrysler-branded cars. The 1934 Airflow models are noted for their unique styling. They generated interest for their engineering innovations. It has a 115.5 in (2,934 mm) wheelbase.

The Desoto Airflow was a result of Chrysler Corporation policy of badge engineering, being mechanically substantially similar to the longer wheelbase, longer bodied Chrysler Airflow.

== Airflow streamlining ==
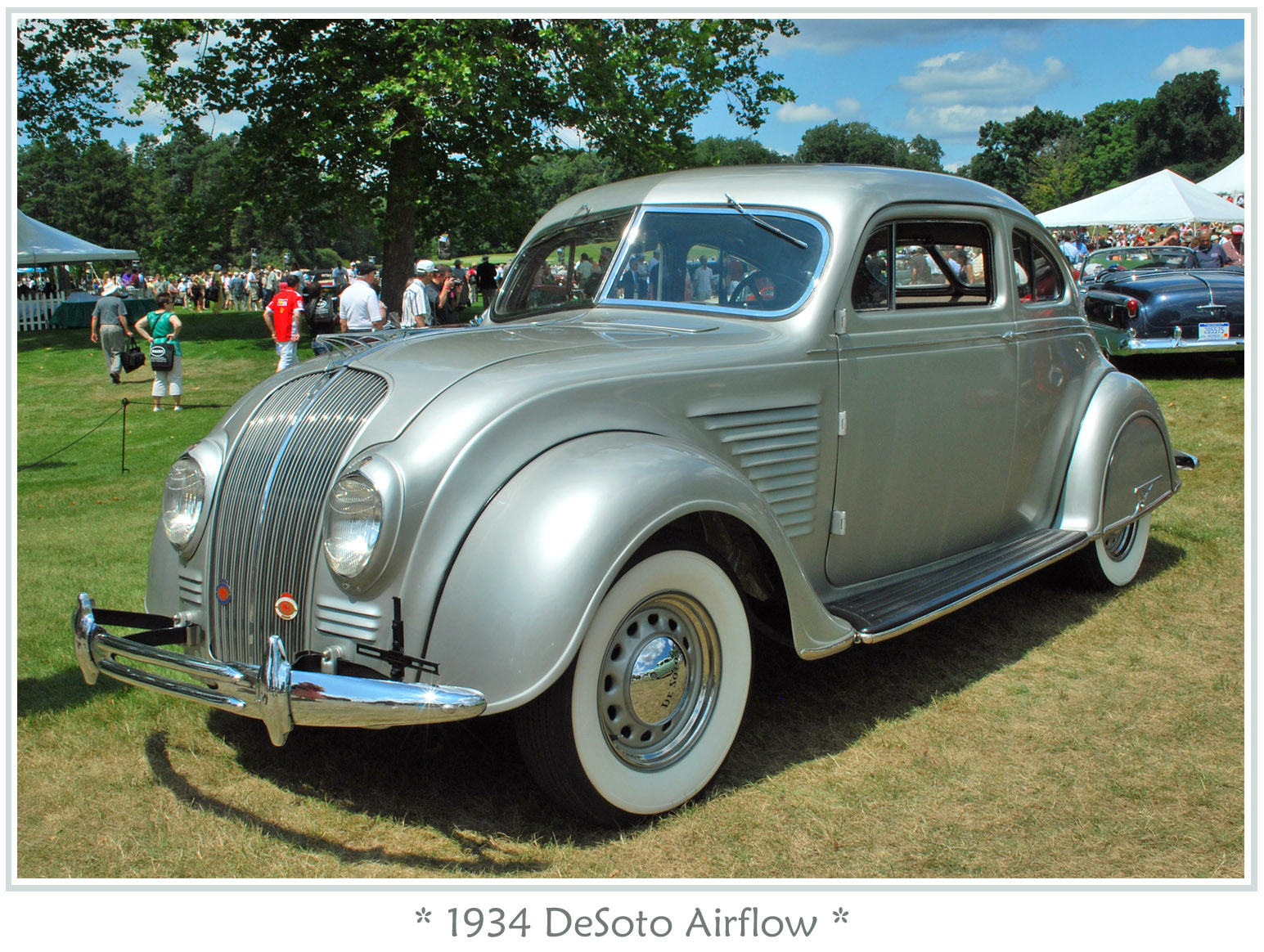
1934 DeSoto Airflow coupe

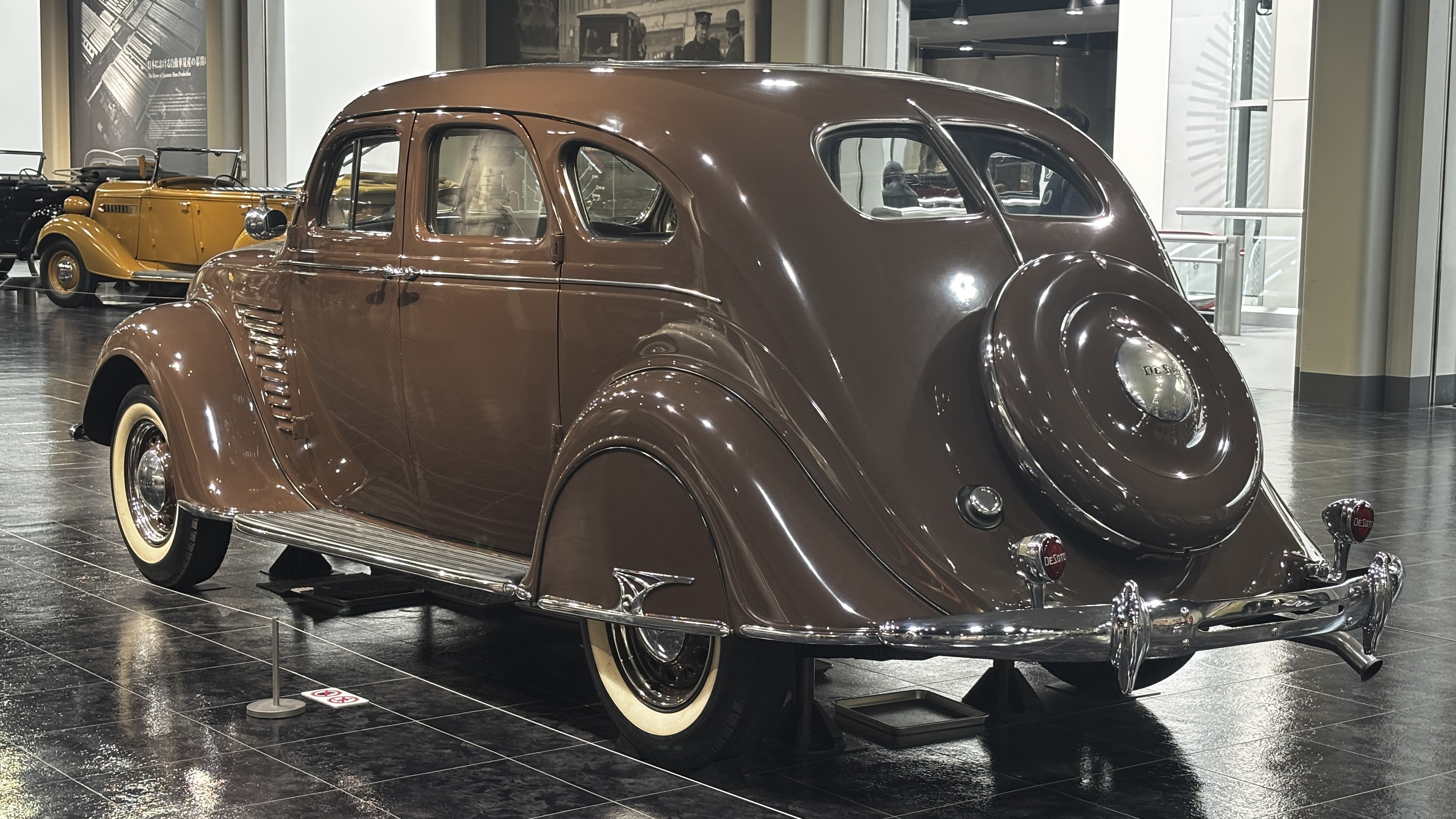
A 1934 DeSoto Airflow sedan in the Toyota Automobile Museum

This aerodynamic, radically designed car debuted to much fanfare alongside its more luxurious stablemate, the Chrysler Airflow. From the front bumper back, the Airflow's design represented the first major attempt to smooth away the wind catching objects and channels found on cars of the era. Headlights were moved from their traditional pods forward of the radiator, and housed in flush mountings on either side of the broad waterfall-styled grille, which lacked the traditional upright radiator throat and decorative cap ornament. In place of the flat windshield that most cars had (and which caught the brunt of on coming winds as cars moved through the atmosphere), the Airflow split the windshield into two panes of glass, each angled to better redirect the air around them, while the upscale Imperial offered a one piece curved glass windshield on the limousine starting 1934. Front and rear fenders received smoother, more form fitting curves. In the rear, Airflows encased the rear wheels through the use of fender skirts.

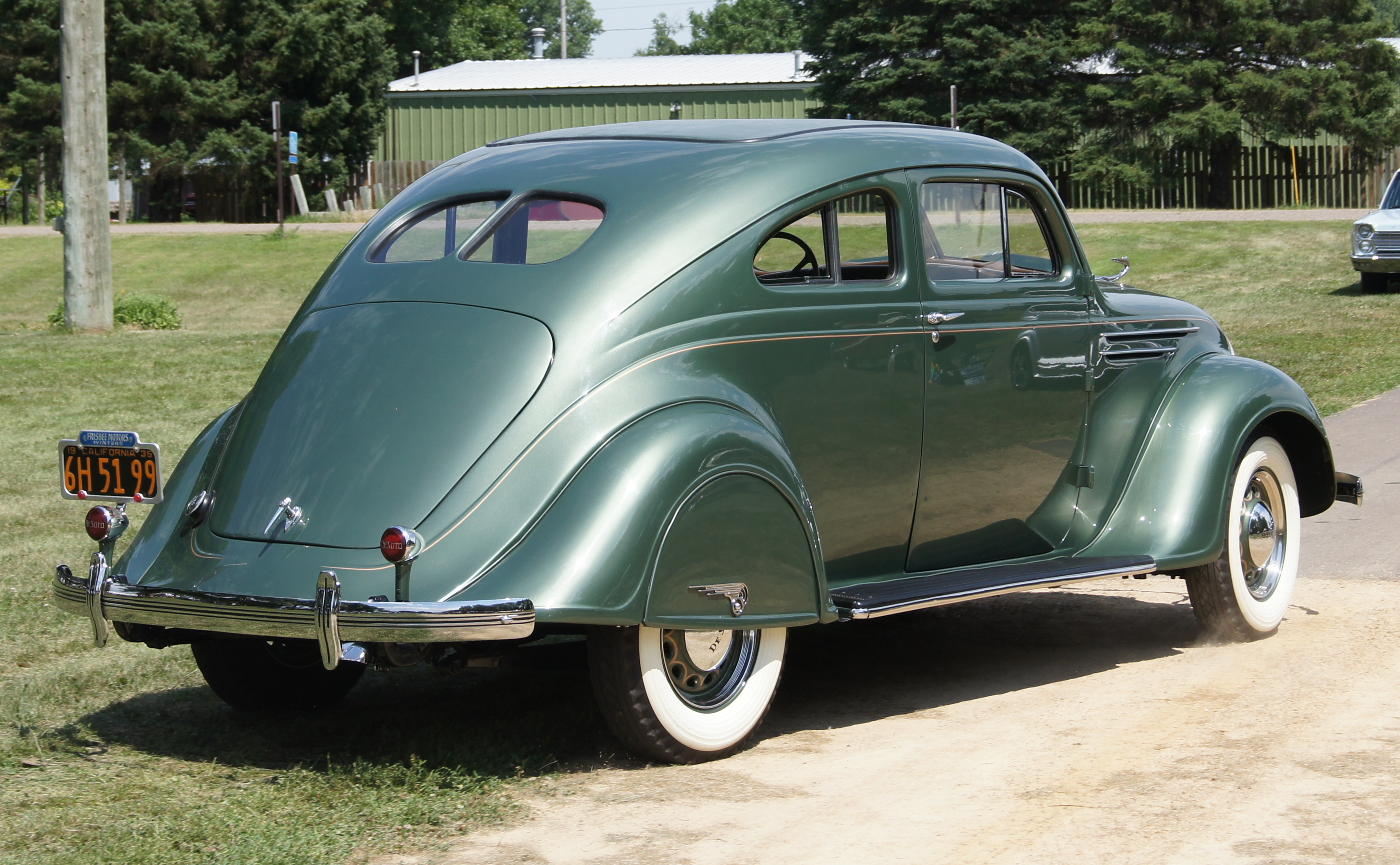
1935 DeSoto Airflow coupe rear

In addition to the benefits of its smoother exterior design, which translated into a quieter passenger compartment than on previous DeSoto models, the car featured wider front seats and deeper back seats with more leg room. Passengers sat on seats which were a good distance from either axle. They reminded one of a Victorian era davenport (sofa).

Because of the car's unibody construction, passengers rode within the frame of the car, not on top of the frame as they did with most other American makes. It also boasted a stiffer body and better weight distribution through the engine placement over the front wheels, in contrast to the common practice of placing the center of the engine's gravity just behind the front wheels. The automotive press gave the cars positive reviews for their handling and acceleration.

== Marketing failure ==
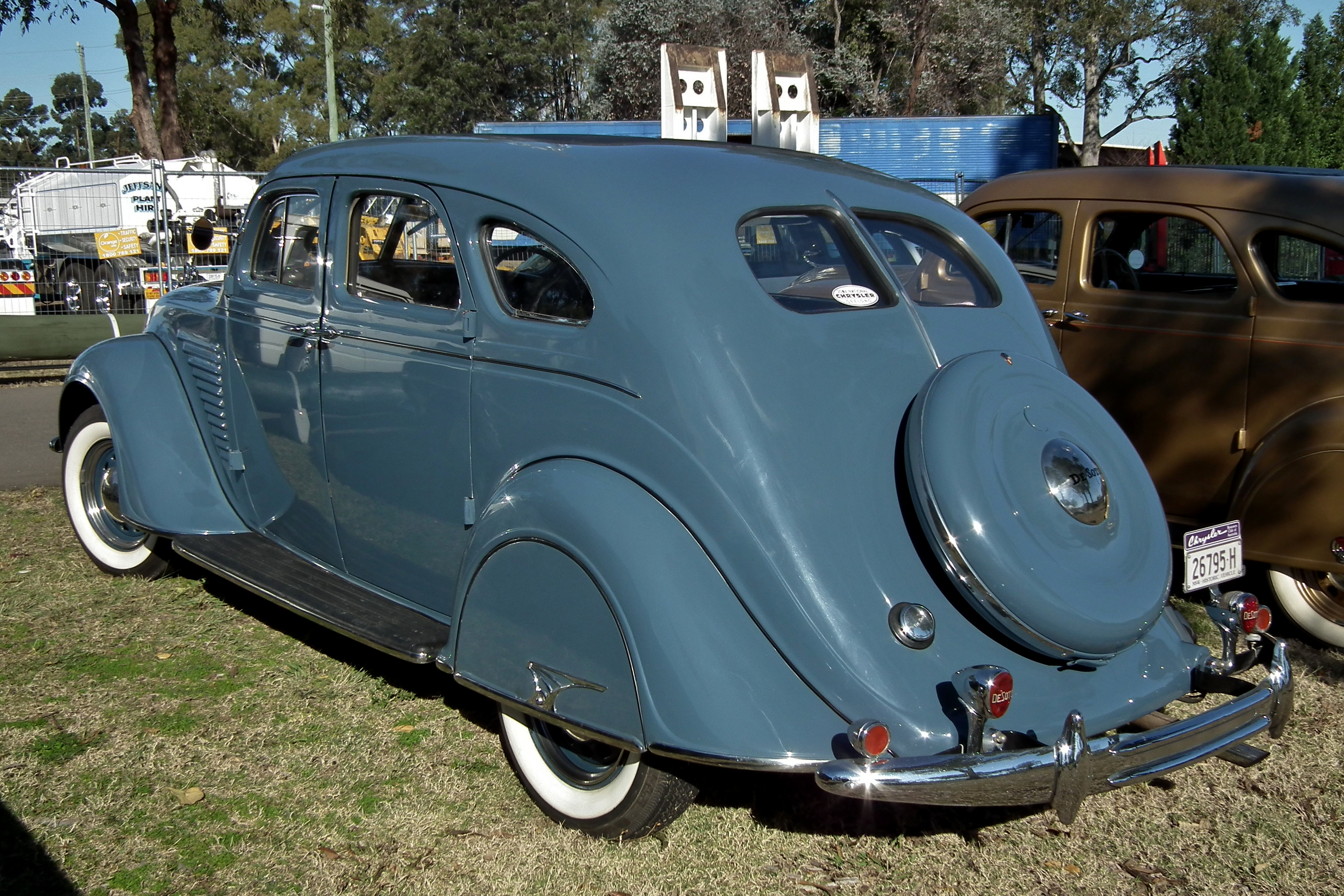
1934 DeSoto Airflow sedan rear

DeSoto (and Chrysler) touted all of its Airflow bodies as "futuristic" in an age of streamlining, but the public found the cars to be too different in a time of economic uncertainty. While Chrysler's cars looked better, with the Airflow bodies stretched over their longer wheelbases, the shorter 115" wheelbase of the DeSoto made the cars seem bulky. Walter P. Chrysler, who had been a strong proponent of the Airflow project, was stunned by the lack of interest in the car, which he believed pointed the way for the future of American cars.

Interest in the Airflow was strong when it was introduced. Unfilled orders for it totaled 15,580 on April 30, 1934. This was 48.3% of comparable Chrysler and DeSoto shipments in 1933.

In May 1936, the DeSoto Airflow began to be promoted in some 435 newspapers in the United States. The highly streamlined car was advertised together with more traditional Airstream cars in general magazines and by itself in class magazines. The DeSoto advertising account was managed by J. Sterling Getchell.

Rumors persisted that the Airflow's body was unsafe. Tests showed its all-steel uni-body construction safer than those of other cars made at the time (most automotive manufacturers still used body on frame construction, with a stout metal chassis and partial wooden sub-framing over which steel skins were applied for their car bodies). In one widely distributed advertising film shown in movie theatres, an empty Airflow was pushed off a Pennsylvania cliff, falling over 110 feet (34 m); once righted, the car was driven off, battered, but recognizable. Still, the myth persisted that Airflows were unsafe.

While Chrysler still built a more familiar-looking car in 1934, DeSoto only offered the Airflow. Despite DeSoto selling more Airflows than Chrysler, Chrysler sold more cars overall with the majority being the redesign of the 1933 "regular" Chrysler.

For 1935 and 1936, Chrysler added the more traditional DeSoto Airstream, which it shared with Chrysler, and DeSoto regained a portion of its lost market share. While the Airflow was still offered, the bulk of DeSoto's sales were Airstreams and the Airflow was relegated to the back of the DeSoto catalog.

Those buyers who did choose the Airflow found that their models carried a more prominent peaked grille design. Other than cosmetic changes (hood louvers, etc.) the cars remained unchanged.

While Chrysler continued to use the Airflow body through 1937, Chrysler discontinued the DeSoto Airflow in 1936 and focused on the DeSoto Airstream so as to offer more traditional designs and the higher sales volume that they brought the division.

== See also ==
- DeSoto Airstream
- Chrysler Airflow
- Toyota AA
