= Chrysler Six =

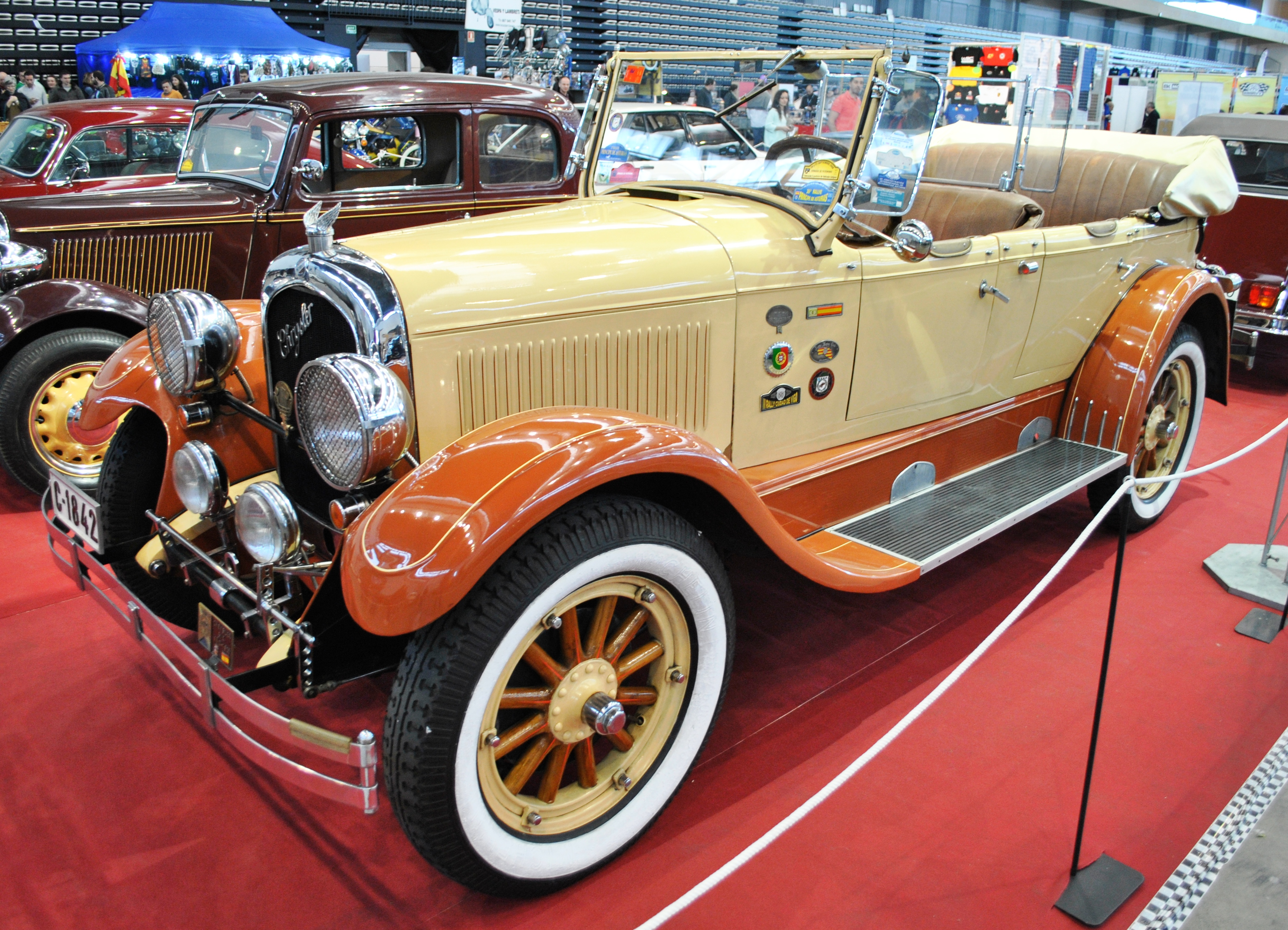
- 1926 Chrysler Six Model B-70

Overview
- Manufacturer: Chrysler
- Production: 1924–1936
- Assembly: Highland Park Chrysler Plant, Highland Park, Michigan; Jefferson Avenue Assembly; Detroit, Michigan

Body and chassis
- Class: full-size car
- Body style: 2-door coupe 2-door brougham 2-door coach 2-door roadster 4-door sedan 4-door Phaeton; 4-door Town Car; 4-door Crown Imperial Sedan
- Related: DeSoto Six (starting 1929)

Powertrain
- Engine: 180.2 cu in (3.0 L) Chrysler I6 (1927–1929); 201 cu in (3.3 L) Chrysler I6 (1924–1925); 218.6 cu in (3.6 L) Chrysler I6 (1926); 248.9 cu in (4.1 L) Chrysler I6 (1928–1929); 268.4 cu in (4.4 L) Chrysler I6 (1930); 241.5 cu in (4.0 L) Chrysler I6 (1935 C-6 & 1936 C-7); Airstream; 273.8 cu in (4.5 L) Chrysler I8 (1935 CZ & 1936 C-8); 323.5 cu in (5.3 L) Chrysler I8 (1935 C-1)
- Transmission: 3-speed manual transmission

Dimensions
- Wheelbase: 109 in (2,769 mm) (Series 60); 112.75 in (2,864 mm) (Series 70); 120 in (3,048 mm) (Series 70); 124.5 in (3,162 mm) (Series 77); 118 in (2,997 mm) (1935 C-6 & 1936 C-7); 121 in (3,073 mm) (1935 CZ & C-1/1936 C-8 ) 133 in (3,378 mm) (1935 C-1 LWB/1936 C-8 LWB)
- Length: 160 in (4,064 mm) (1924)

Chronology
- Successor: Chrysler Royal (Straight Six); Chrysler Imperial (Straight Eight)

The Chrysler Six was a series of cars that were all installed with the Chrysler Straight Six when the company assumed operations of the Maxwell Automobile Company in 1924, and Chalmers Automobile Company in 1926. The Chrysler Six initially consisted of several Models, then Series designations that originally declared the approximate top speed each vehicle was able to consistently maintain, then each series number was incrementally updated every new model year, and each series was offered in several body style choices. The engines were technically advanced for their time and were entered in the 24 Hours of Le Mans for 1925, 1928 and 1929.

== History ==
Development of the B-70 began as early as 1919 for Willys Corporation, a holding company owned by John Willys, independent of the Willys-Overland Organization. The vehicle was originally intended to be launched as the Willys Six. Three former Studebaker engineers were responsible for the design, Fred Zeder, Owen Skelton and Carl Breer, who were known as "The Three Musketeers" when they worked for Studebaker and introduced the Studebaker Big Six.

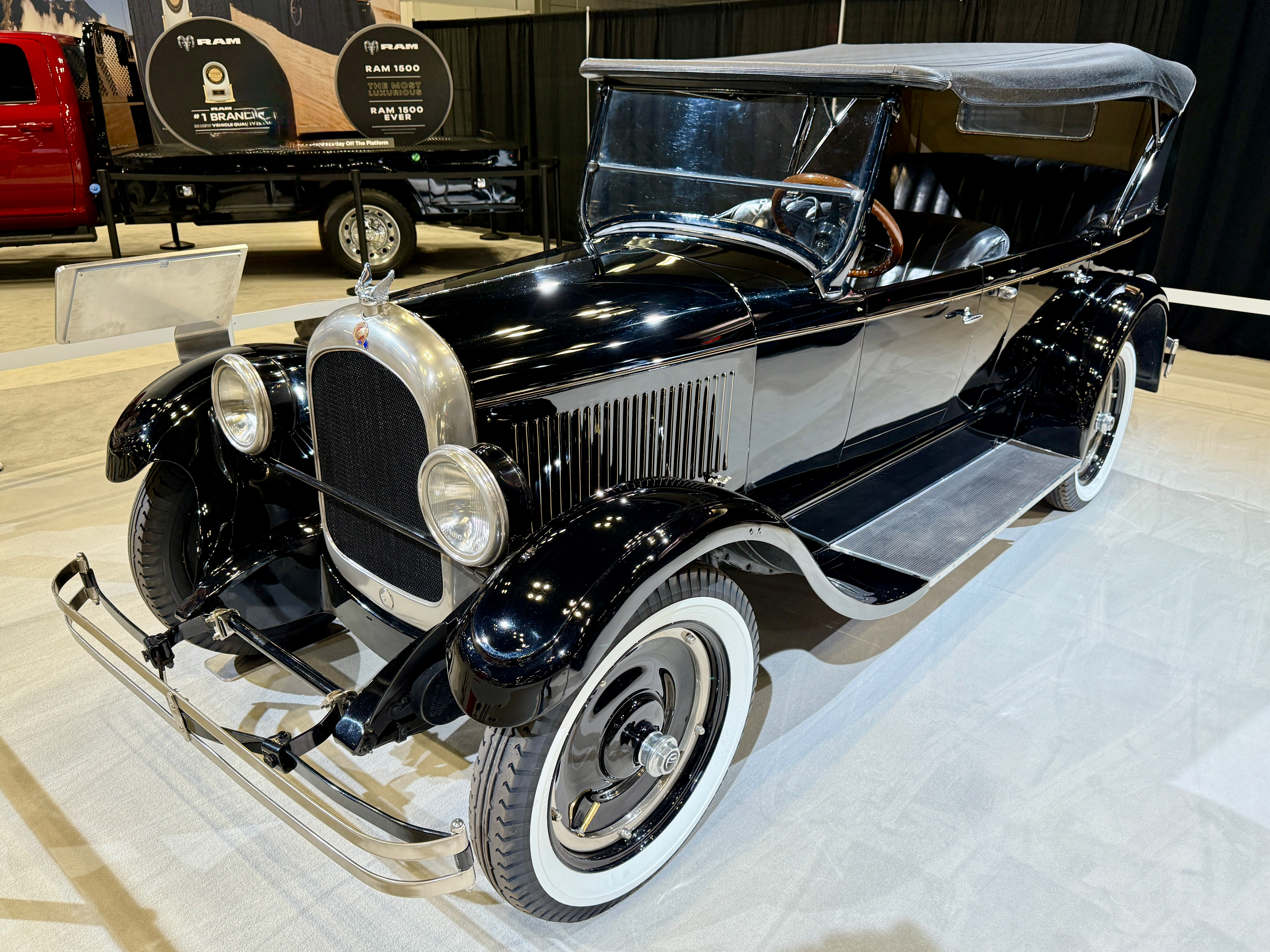
1924 Chrysler Six

When the Willys Corporation went bankrupt in 1919, William C. Durant, who had been fired as president of General Motors for a second time, out bid the purchase of their modern factory in Elizabeth, New Jersey which originally built Duesenbergs, including several prototypes and the Willys Six, against Walter Chrysler who was only interested in the Willys Six car. For his new company, Chrysler needed a bigger, more luxurious vehicle with which to compete against the Buick Master Six, Chrysler's former employer. When Durant won the bidding, it led to the creation of the Flint Six and an attempt to create a competitor to GM called United States Motor Company. Zeder, Skelton and Breer did not agree at all with the new concept, especially since many of their innovative ideas had been highlighted. Chrysler brought the three to Chalmers, where they resumed development from mid-1923 at the point at which it had been interrupted by Durant. In January 1924, the finished product was ceremoniously presented to the public as the Chrysler Six Model B-70 in the Commodore Hotel on the occasion of the New York Auto Show.

== Model B-70 ==
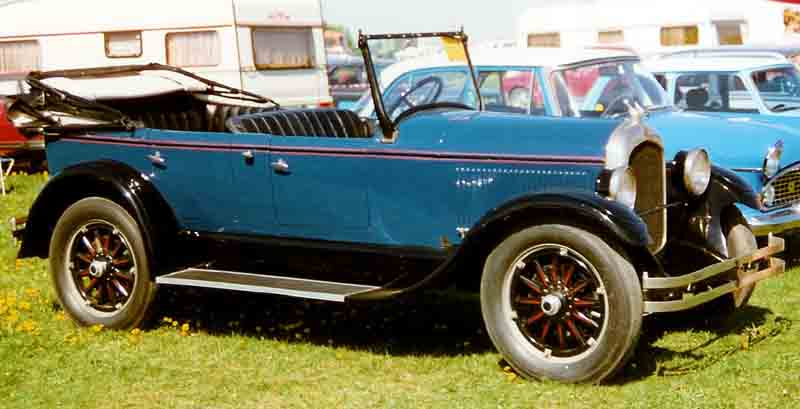
1924 Chrysler Six Model B-70 Touring Sedan

The Chrysler Six Model B-70 is a full-size car that was the first car produced by Chrysler from 1924 to 1925. It was the first model produced under the Chrysler brand. It replaced the cars of Maxwell, whose brand was bought by Walter Chrysler in 1921. Nine different bodies supplied from Fisher Body Co. were offered in the first year of production. The open cars initially had horizontally split windshields inspired by the Brewster windshield and 30-inch wheels with five lug nuts attached to hydraulic four-wheel drum brakes. The success was sensational: 32,000 cars had been sold by the end of 1924, a new record for the introduction of a new model. With the introduction of the B-70, the production of the Chalmers was stopped. The entry level Roadster with rumble seat was available for US$1,595 ($29,964 in 2025 dollars), while top model documented was the Town Car listed at US$3,725 ($69,979 in 2025 dollars). The new Chrysler offered several items, technology and body style choices that had become extra cost items from other manufacturers that Chrysler included for no extra cost, while it was priced in the medium price field.

The cars with the high-performance engines reached a top speed of 70 to 75 mph (113 to 121 km/h), only about 5 mph less than the Packard Eight. Ralph DePalma won the Mt. Wilson hill climb driving a stripped down touring car 1,000 miles in 786 minutes on 5 January 1925. A stripped down roadster was entered at the 1925 24 Hours of Le Mans where it finished the race, and Sir Malcolm Campbell set a lap record of 100 mph (161 km/h) at Brooklands in a streamlined roadster.

In the following year, Maxwell became the Chrysler Corporation. The cars continued to be built almost unchanged, only the split windshield on the open models was replaced by a one-piece, top-hinged version. From mid-1925, Chrysler produced its own bodies after purchasing the Kercheval Body Factory of Detroit which became the Chrysler Factory at Jefferson Avenue. The hood ornament/radiator cap was a stylized Viking Winged helmet.

== Model G-70 ==
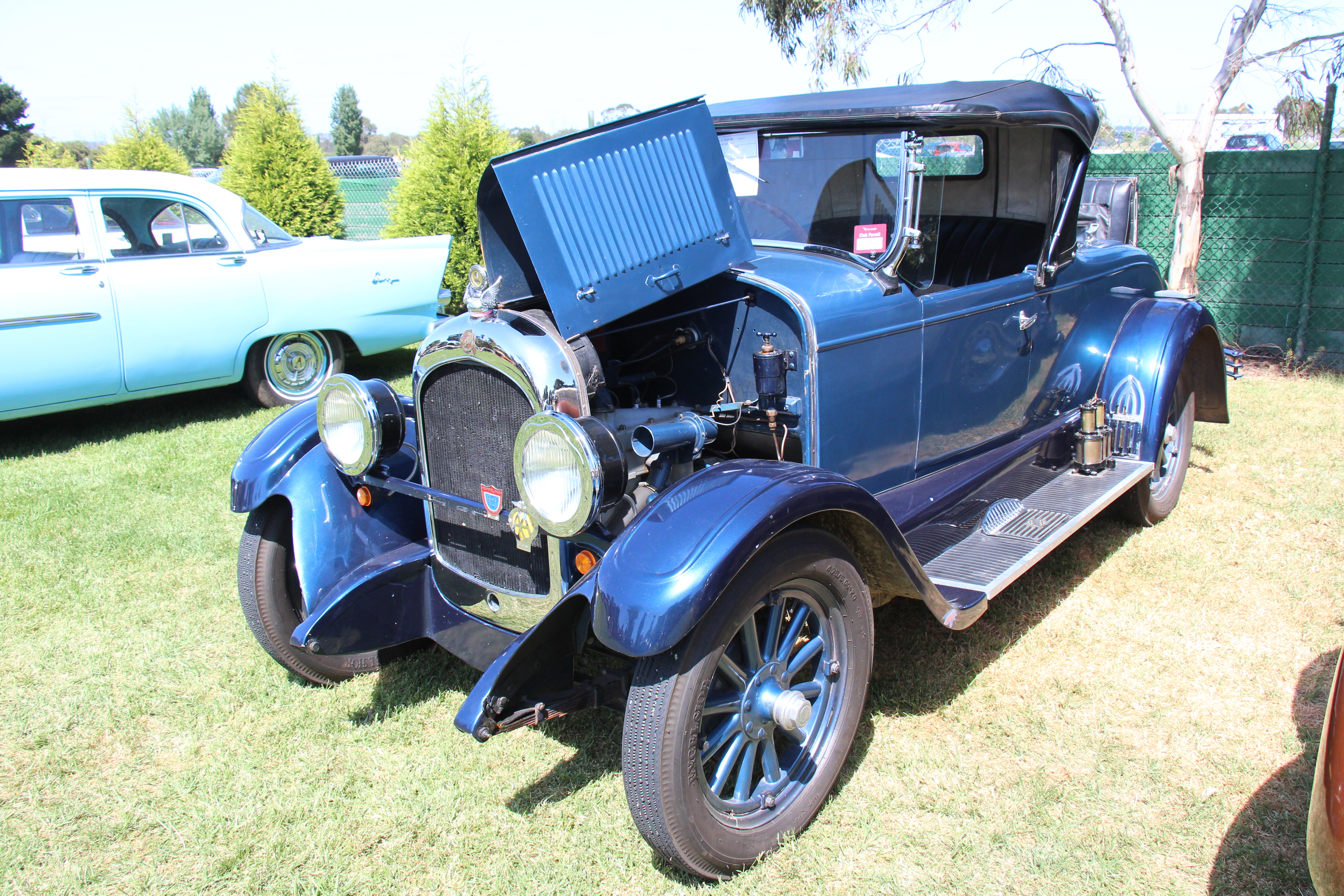
1926 Chrysler Six Model G-70 Roadster

In 1926, the Model B-70 was replaced by the Model G-70, of which 72,039 G-70s out of a total of 108,600 Chryslers had been built. The G-70 was an appearance upgrade while the previous B-70 had only been manufactured for two years. There were minor changes made to the door openings, headlight design had exterior trim changes while the exterior headlight housings had lengthened. There were several body style choices offered in both two-door and four door configurations, and among them was the Chrysler Touring four-door, five-passenger which was listed at US$1,395 ($25,370 in 2025 dollars). There was for the first time a trim package called Royal Coupe and Crown Sedan which in later years became standalone model names. The only engine displacement offered was the 218.6 cu in (3.6 L). The G-70 was joined by the all new luxury model Chrysler Series E-80 which was renamed Imperial for 1927 for the first time.

== Series 60 and Series 70 ==
The Series 60 was the shorter wheelbase version of the Model G-70 in 1927, while the Series 70 remained with the longer wheelbase. Chrysler branded vehicles were now positioned as "nicely equipped" and due to the sales successes, the company purchased Dodge in 1928, while the entry level Chrysler Series 50 was rebranded Plymouth in 1928, and DeSoto would be introduced in 1929. The Series 60 was developed from the previous Series 50 which only had a four-cylinder engine, then was changed to the Plymouth Model Q. The Series 60 had upgraded interior and the six-cylinder engine and upscale appearance items, and was offered in six, two-door body style choices to include roadsters with only two, four-door body style selections of a choice of convertible open or closed passenger compartment. The Series 70 remained with the established longer wheelbase, offering seven, two-door body style choices and five, four-door body style selections. Different body style choices were given "sport" or "custom sport" model names for phaeton, rumbleseat coupes and convertibles and a landau brougham. Standard equipment included hydraulic brakes, one-piece glass windshields, and a Delco-Remy ignition system as well as a coincidental lock on the manual transmission. Both the Series 60 and 70 offered standard equipment wheel size of 30 inches with a choice of wooden spoke or pressed steel discs. The top level body style choice for the Series 70 was the Crown Sedan at US$1,795 ($33,269 in 2025 dollars), offering features that were extra cost on other brands as standard. One of the optional items were a removable windshield and wind wings for coupes installed with a rumbleseat. The Dodge Six was first introduced in 1927 and was based on the Chrysler Six Series 60.

For 1928 the Series 62 and Series 72 offered appearance changes and engineering improvements, adding more standard equipment while keeping retail prices unchanged. As the flagship Imperial Series 80L began to offer customized coachwork choices for additional cost, the Series 72 offered similar appearances and model naming conventions but modestly priced without the "Imperial" name. Advancements shared with the Series 62 and 72 include a taller radiator, headlight posts attached to the chassis directly, tubular front axle, rubber shock insulators on leaf springs, with throttle and headlight controls installed on the steering wheel center hub. Convenience items included an electric gas gauge installed in the instrument panel, ignition lock on the dashboard, and an exterior mounted sun visor. Prices listed for the Series 62 four-door, five passenger Landau Sedan was documented at US$1,235 ($22,890 in 2025 dollars) on a 109 in (2,769 mm) wheelbase while the Series 72 four-door, five passenger Imperial Town Cabriolet by LeBaron was listed at US$3,595 ($66,631 in 2025 dollars) on a 120.5 in (3,061 mm) wheelbase. Four Series 72 roadsters were entered in the 1928 24 Hours of Le Mans. All were driven by French teams while two finished third and fourth in their class, which only consisted of two Bentley 4½ Litre and one Stutz Vertical Eight BB, while two cars did not finish due to radiator and starter failure. The Series 62 was badge engineered again and introduced as the DeSoto Six in 1929.

Production year 1929 introduced two series platforms as the Chrysler Six, with the Series 65 with a 112.75 in (2,864 mm) wheelbase and the Series 75 had a 121 in (3,073 mm) wheelbase. Both Series shared narrow profile radiators and the cowl height was increased. The ignition switch was upgraded to a keyhole, and the crown depth of the fenders over the wheels was lengthened, and built-in adjustable radiator shutters were introduced as well. The color combination of the dashboard was how the different series could be distinguished, with silver and black for the Series 65 and gold and black for the Series 75. Delco Remy Lovejoy hydraulic shock absorbers were now available on all Series. Coachwork choices were reduced for the Series 65 and added to the Series 75, listing five coupe selections and seven sedan choices, listing four separate convertible sedan options. One Series 75 and one Series 77 roadsters were again entered in the 1929 24 Hours of Le Mans, where both were driven by the same French teams from the previous year and finished sixth and seventh in their class, which only consisted of three Bentley 4½ Litres.

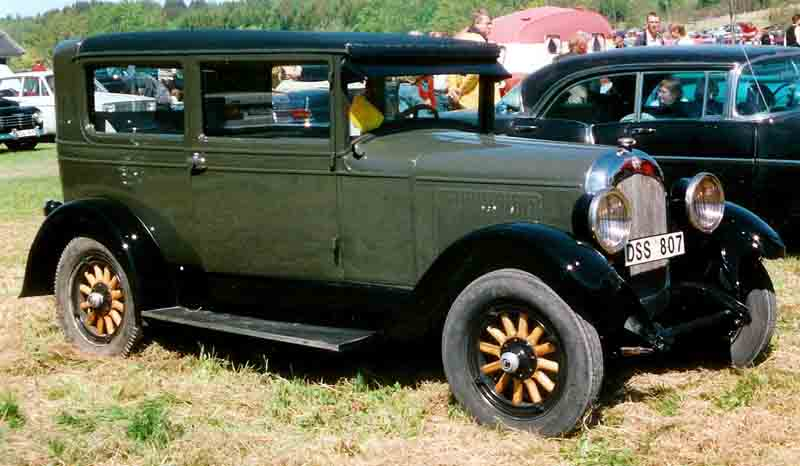
1927 Chrysler Six Series 60 2-door sedan

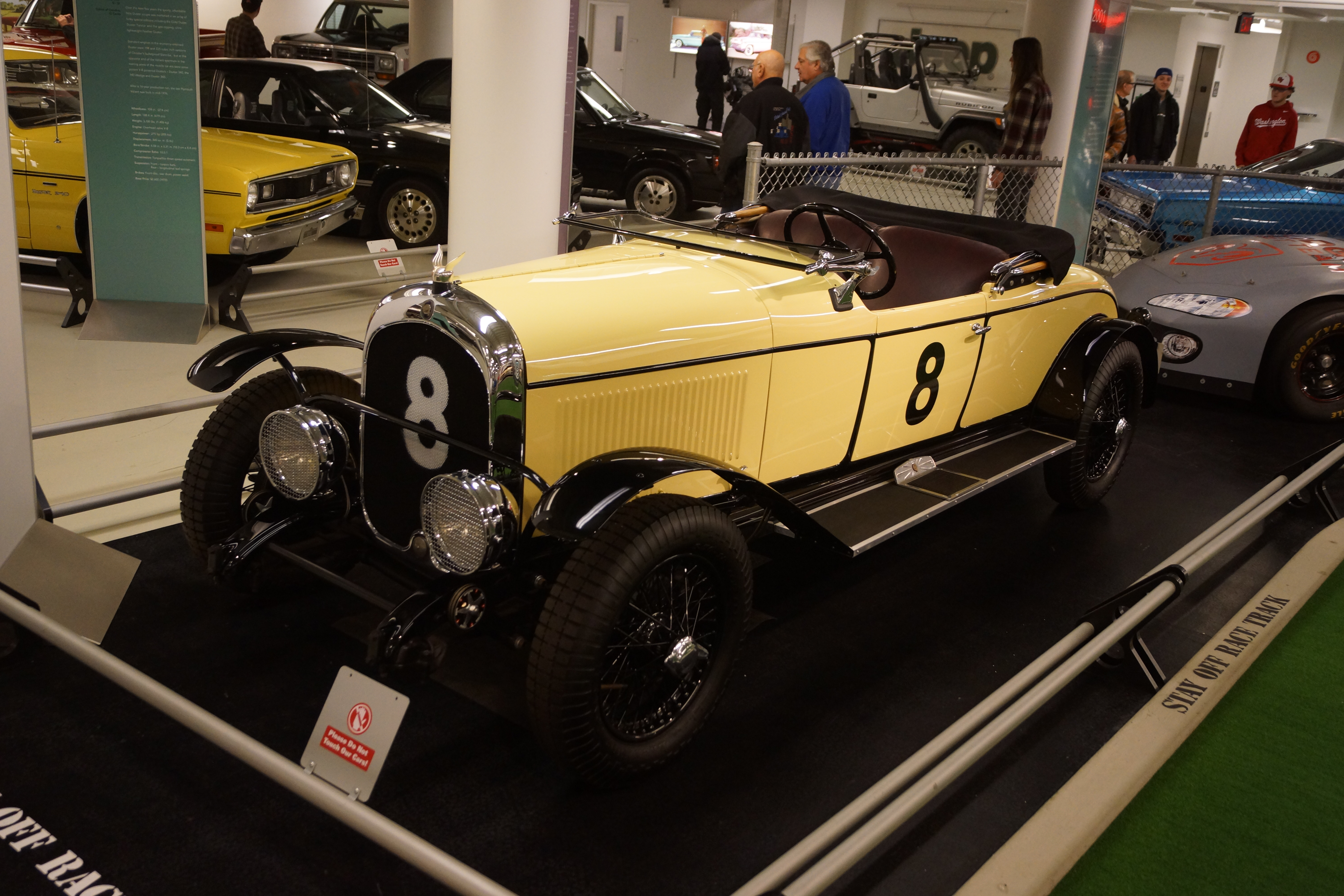
1928 Chrysler Six Series 72 Roadster driven at Le Mans

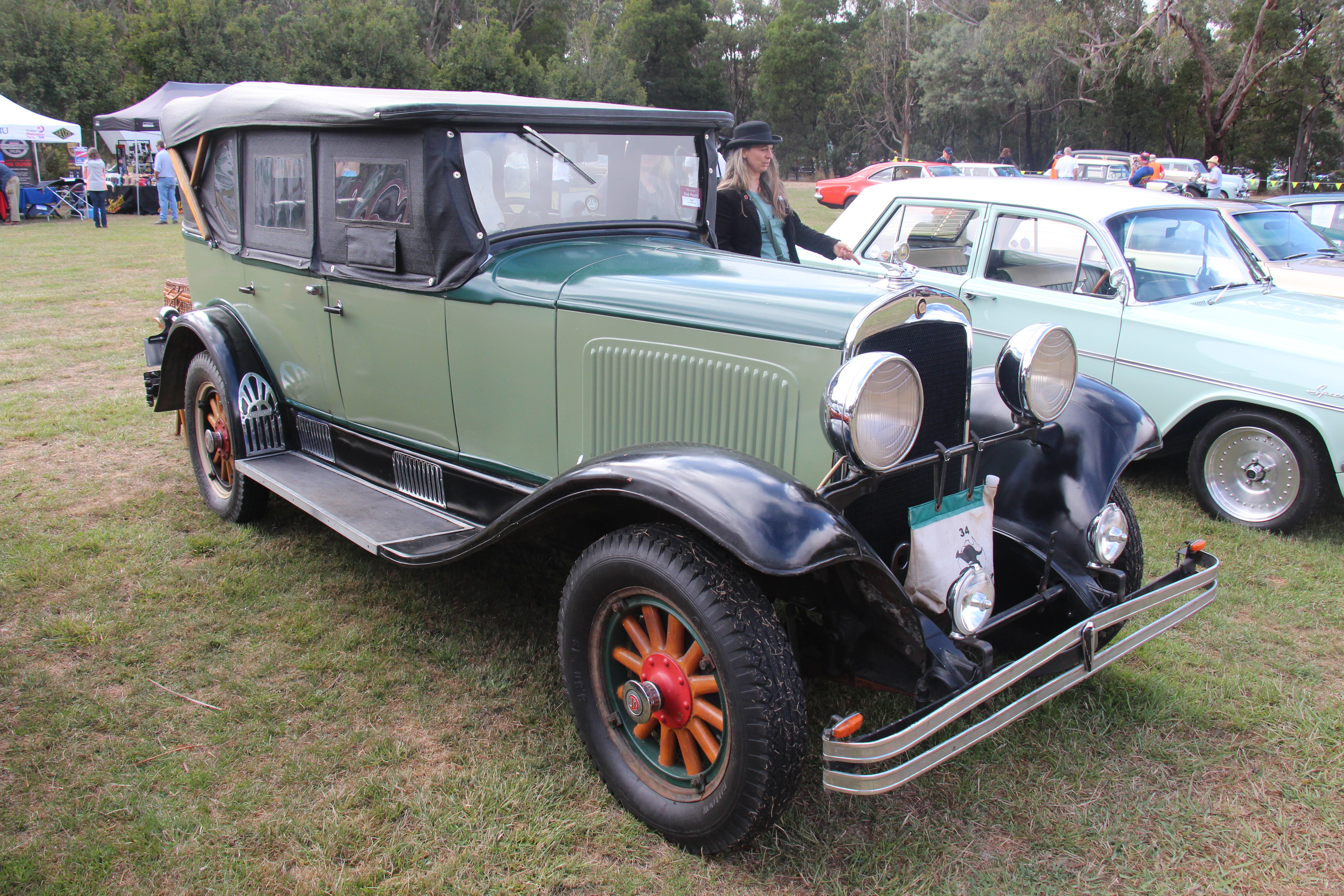
1929 Chrysler Six Series 75 Phaeton

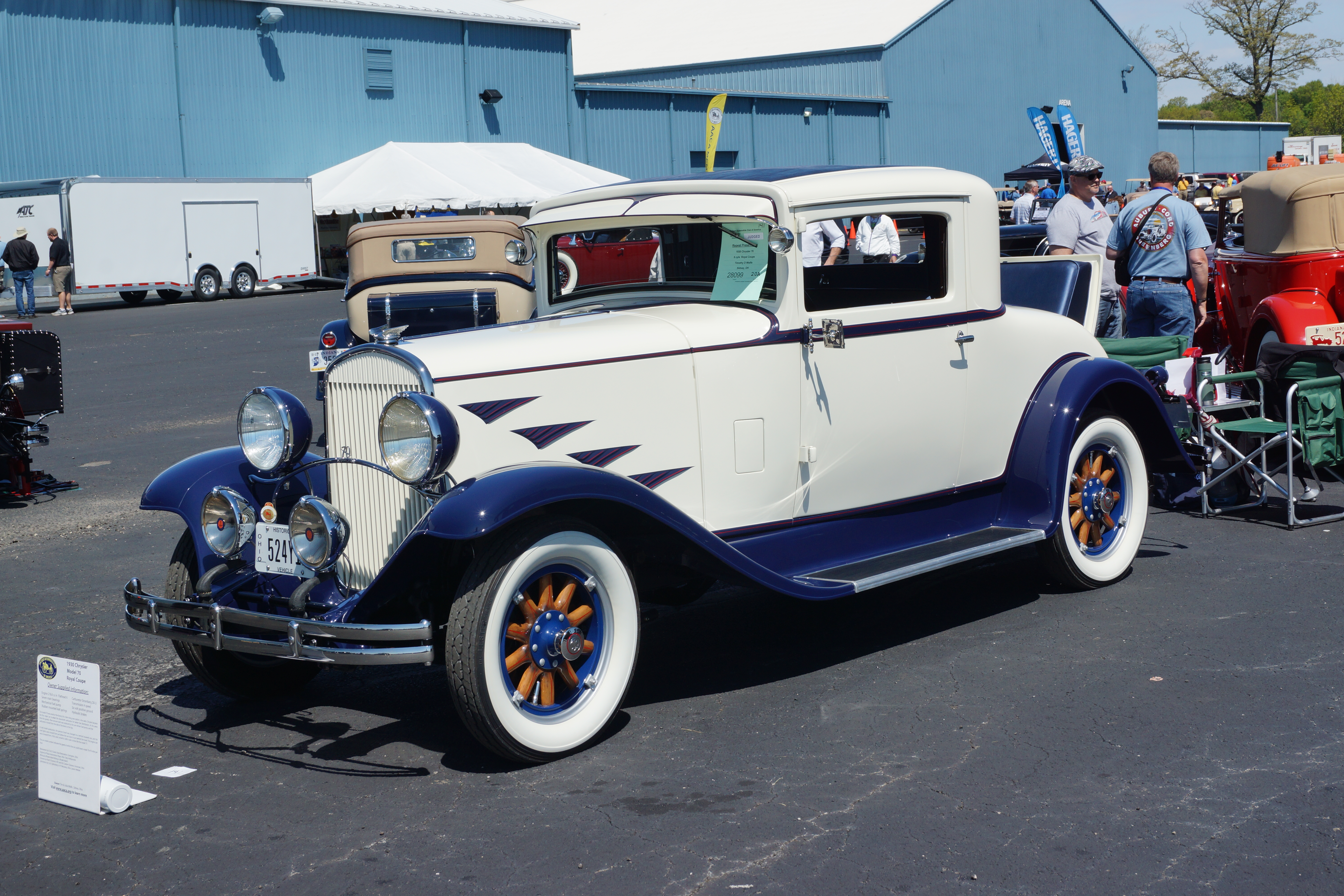
1930 Chrysler Six Series 70 Royal Coupe

== Series CJ, CM, CI, CO, CA, CB ==
The new decade saw updated styling and engineering efforts for Chrysler, that introduced the Chrysler Six Series CJ, which was a downsized version of the Series 66, Series 70 and the Series 77. The timing was not the best with the Wall Street crash of 1929 and the Great Depression beginning in September but Chrysler forged ahead and updated their product line. While cars of the 1930s shared common appearances across all manufacturers, some stylistic features were introduced to distinguish, and Chrysler introduced Pennon-type hood louvers on all Sixes, which was replaced mid-year with vertical hood louvers that were more functional and dissipated heat more effectively. The front headlight tie-bar was updated to a curved appearance and the model number attached as a pendant to the top of the bar. In 1931, Chrysler's former employer Buick introduced the Buick Century which installed the large straight eight from the Roadmaster and installed it in the entry-level Special.

The Series CJ introduced a different chassis from the previous Series 60 and 70 in that it was closer to the ground, and introduced hydraulic internal brakes, a fuel pump, rubber spring shackles and hydraulic shock absorbers, while introducing a narrow profile radiator that was slightly angled rearwards that was used by the Chrysler Eight and Imperial. The Series CJ was offered as a Roadster, Business Coupe or Convertible Coupe, which was listed at US$925 ($17,827 in 2025 dollars) and a Touring Sedan or closed-body Royal Sedan, listed at US$845 ($16,286 in 2025 dollars). The 1931 Series CM was essentially the Series CJ with cowl lights added at the edge of the engine hood and cowl next to the front door leading edge. The Series CM introduced the new Cord L-29 influenced Chrysler corporate appearance shared with DeSoto, Dodge and Plymouth.

For 1932 The Series CI was the sole straight-six product and replaced the original Series 60 and 70, and ended the naming tradition of using top miles per hour attainable in the series names and ended the original appearance body work introduced in 1925. Engineering advances and appearances that were first introduced in 1931 on the Imperial Eight had become standard equipment on all Chryslers, to include the Series CI.

Model year 1933 Series CO was largely a carryover with front fenders that extended forward and the crown of the fenders was deeper to cover the wheels. To aid entry into the front passenger compartment, the doors on both two- and four-door vehicles were hinged in the center, so that the front doors opened from the leading edge of the doors, or in a "suicide door" manner, but the rear doors opened at the trailing edge, or in a conventional manner. Ventilation doors on the sides of the engine compartment were now individual doors instead of vertical louvers, sharing an appearance with the Imperial.

For 1934, the Chrysler Airflow was introduced to replace the eight-cylinder Chrysler Royal and the Series CA and CB were intended to be the final version of this platform. Minor changes included valanced front and rear fenders that hung from behind the wheels, horizontal hood louvers, and body colored radiator shells that concealed the radiator. An independent front suspension was introduced, vent windows and steel spoked wheels permanently replaced wood spokes. The Series CA offered a 117 in (2,972 mm) wheelbase while the Series CB offered a 121 in (3,073 mm) wheelbase but was used for sedans only with two body style choices, with one being a convertible four-door with the centrally located door hinges continued from the previous year. The Series CA and CB could still be offered in chassis only for customized coachwork while the Series CU Airflow wasn't due to the unibody construction. The Series CA roadster convertible was available for US$865 ($20,818 in 2025 dollars), and the four-door sedan was listed at US$845 ($20,337 in 2025 dollars) while the longer Series CB was available for US$970 ($23,345 in 2025 dollars) for the Convertible Sedan.

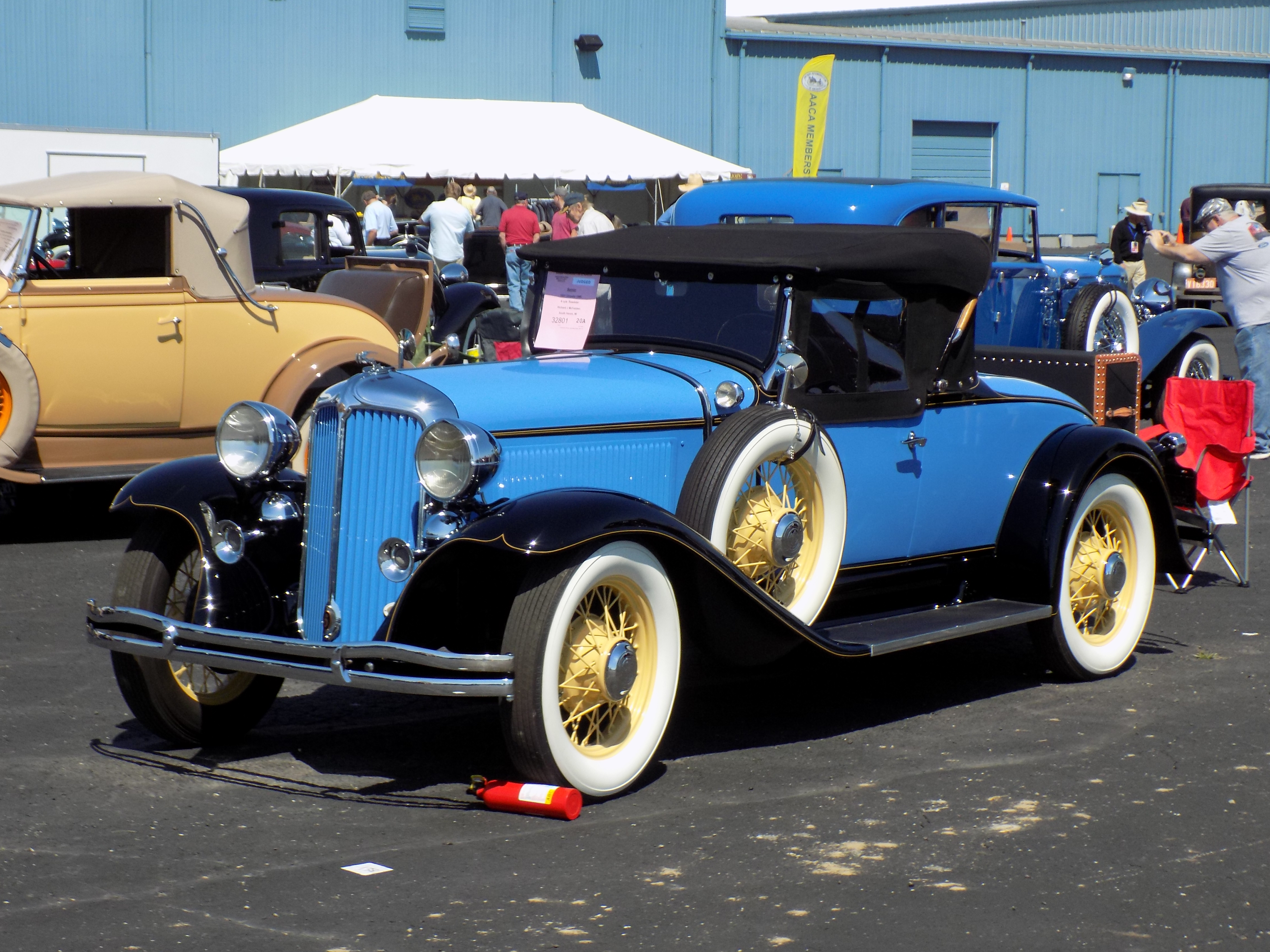
1931 Chrysler Six Series CM Roadster Convertible

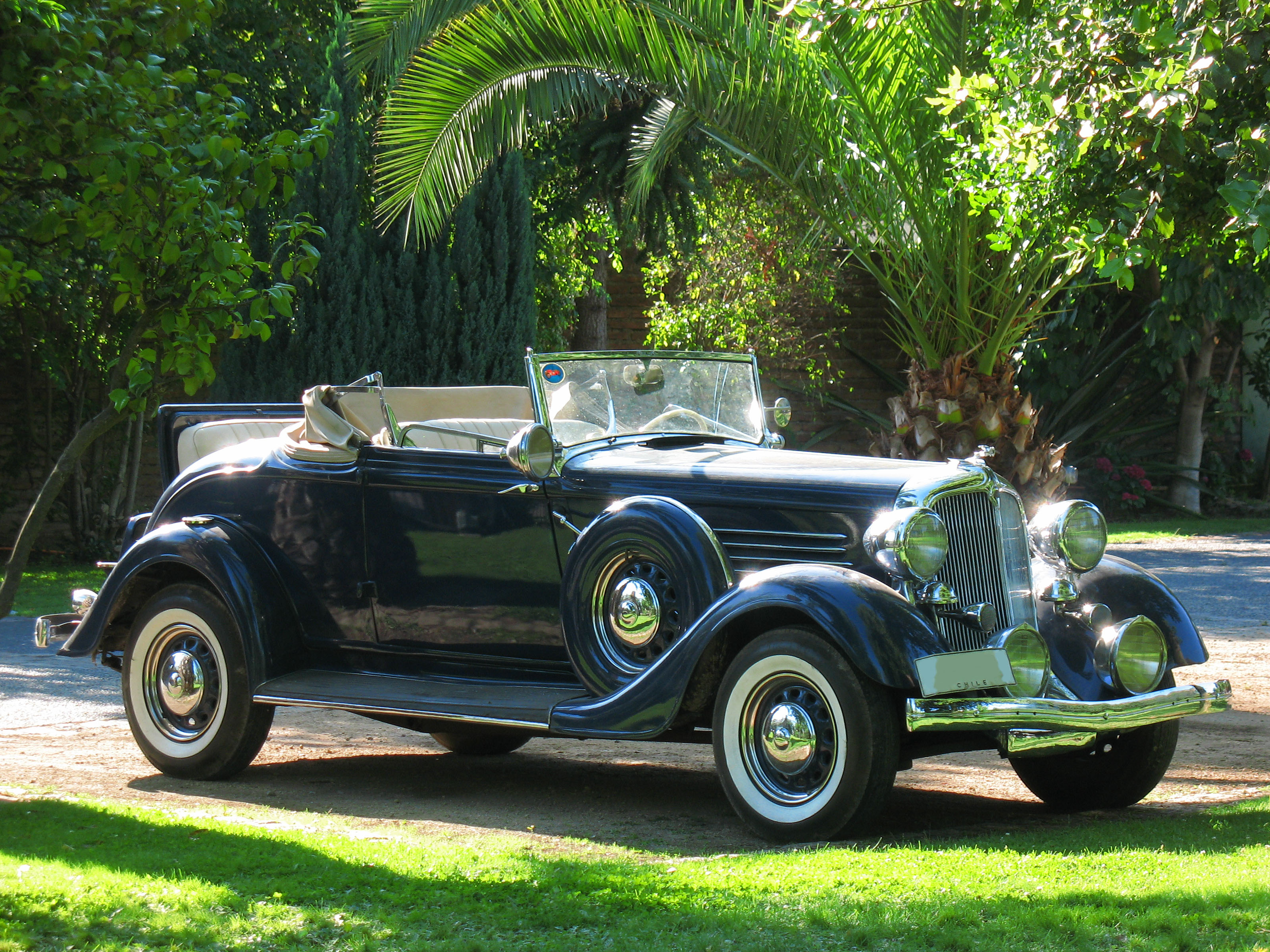
1934 Chrysler Six Series CA Roadster Convertible

== Chrysler Airstream ==
The Chrysler Airstream is an automobile produced by Chrysler in 1935 and 1936 and was the revised version of the Chrysler Six Series CA and CB. The Airstream outsold the Airflow five to one in its first year, and nearly nine to one in 1936. When the Airflow wasn't accepted due to its unusual appearance, Chrysler kept the ten year old Chrysler Six platform in production and refreshed the appearance, while giving it the nameplate "Airstream". The 1935 Airstream was available with both the straight-six and the straight-eight, and was given the model designation Series C-6 for the six cylinder, while the Airstream Series CZ was installed with the straight eight. The Airstream DeLuxe Series C-1 was offered with two wheelbase choices and standard straight eight.

The Airstream Deluxe Series C-1 was a junior model to the Airflow which shared the Series C-1 designation and the Chrysler Straight Eight. The Airstream Series C-6 was a continuation of the previous Chrysler Six Series CA, where Chrysler retrimmed the "CA", gave the car rear fender skirts, and rolled out a model that they hoped would appeal to Depression-era buyers. By marketing the Airstream alongside the Airflow, Chrysler could offer a product the public would purchase while hoping to produce enough Airflows to offset their development costs. A similar car, with the same Airstream name was also sold by Chrysler's companion brand DeSoto during the period. The "suicide door" approach was revised to the rear doors while the front doors opened conventionally, while the previous generation had the door hinged installed on the "b-pillar" providing rearward opening front doors.

For 1936, the Airstream Series C-7 was installed with the straight-six, while the Deluxe Airstream Series C-8 came with the carryover longer wheelbase choices and the straight-eight engine.

Chrysler discontinued the "Airstream" model name for both Chrysler and DeSoto at the beginning of the 1937 model year and reintroduced the Chrysler Royal Series C-16 for six-cylinder and the Chrysler Imperial Series C-14 for the eight-cylinder.

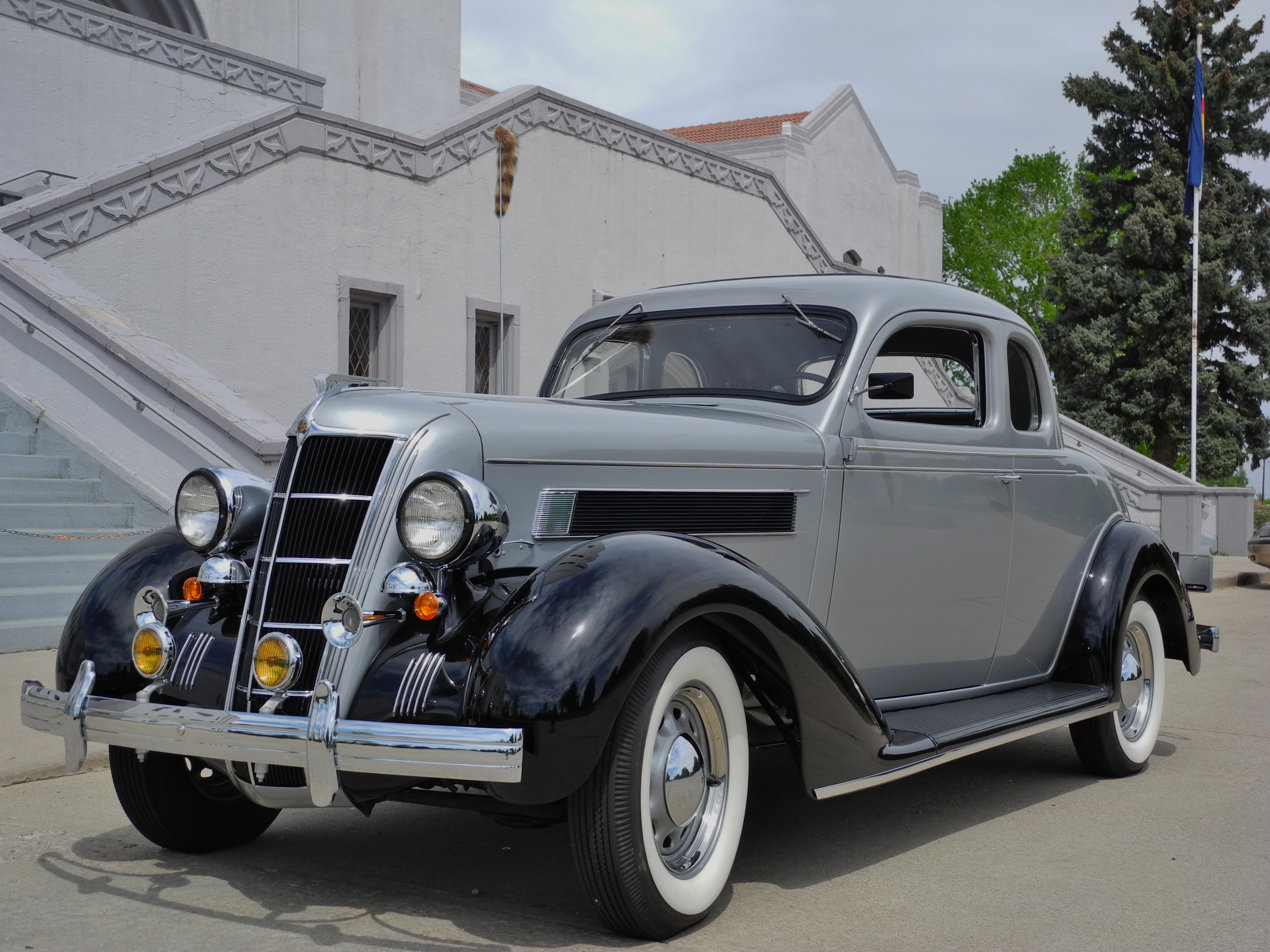
1935 Chrysler Airstream Series C-6 Business Coupe

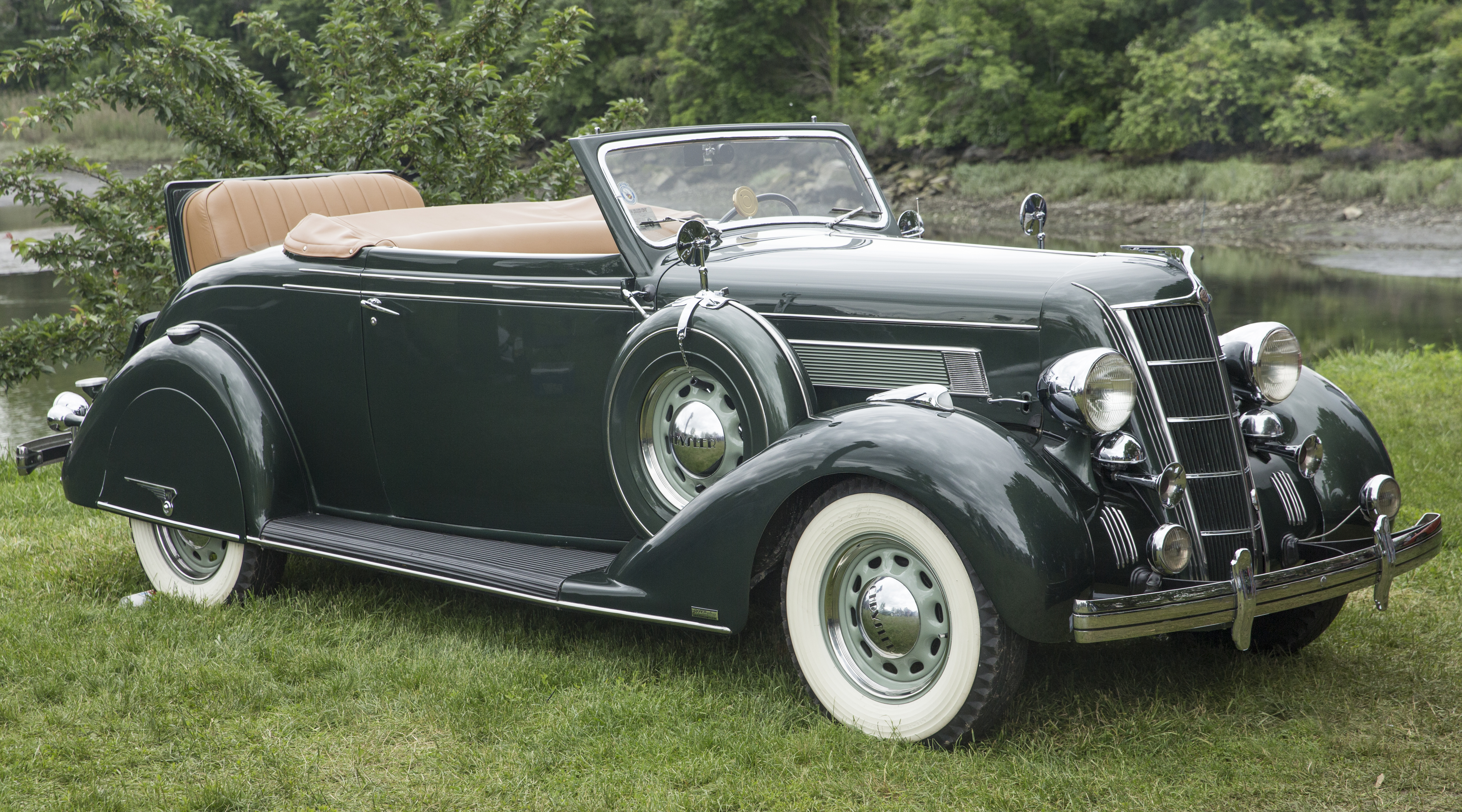
1935 Chrysler Airstream C-6 Convertible Coupe

== See also ==
- Chrysler Airflow
