= DeSoto Six =

Series K/CK/SA/SC/SD/SE/SF/S-1/S-3/S-5/S-6/S-7/S-8
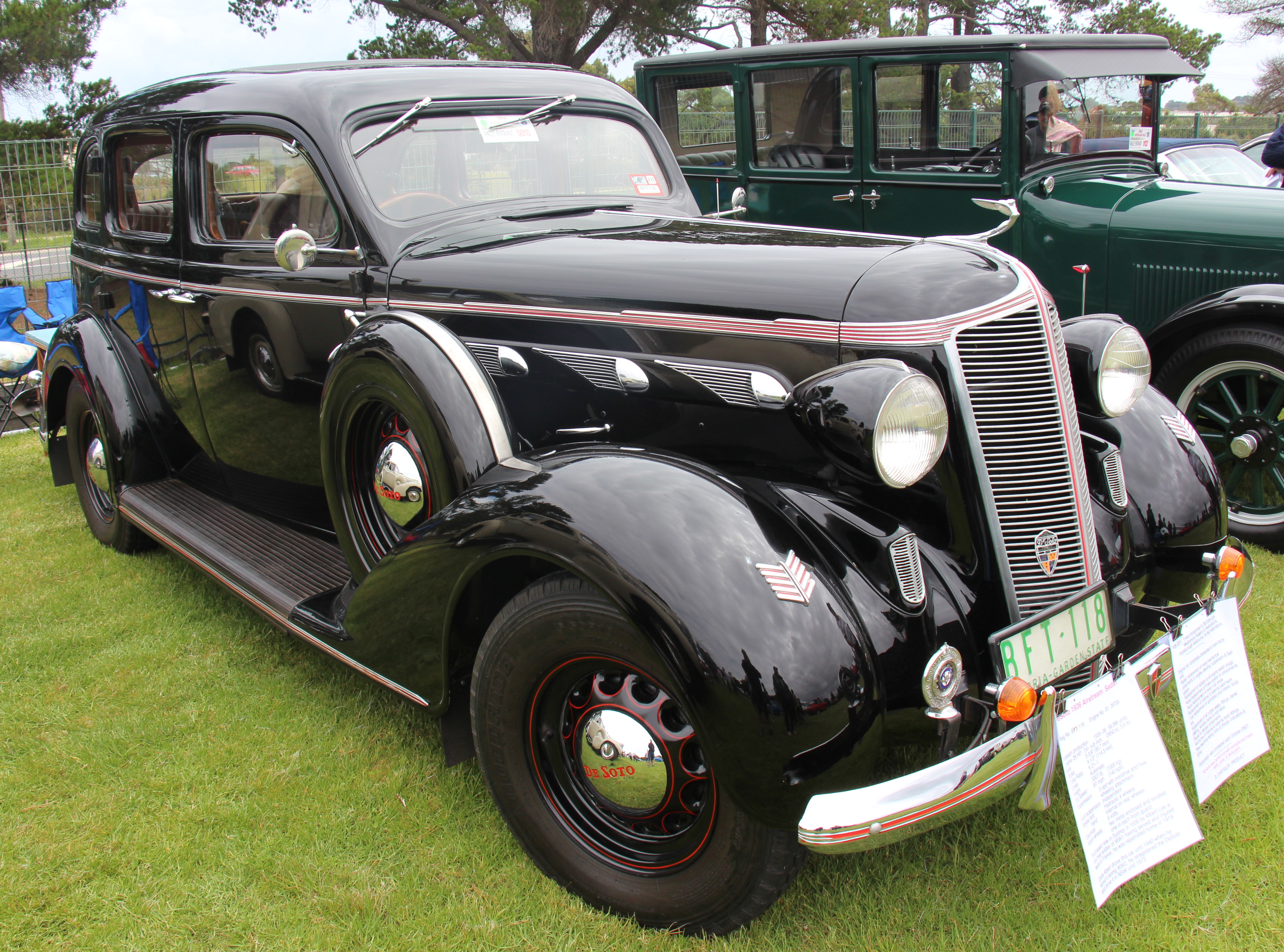
- 1936 DeSoto Airstream Custom sedan

Overview
- Manufacturer: DeSoto (Chrysler)
- Production: 1928–1941
- Model years: 1929–1941
- Assembly: Lynch Road Assembly; Wyoming Road Assembly (starting 1934); Los Angeles (Maywood) Assembly (starting 1932)

Body and chassis
- Class: Full-size
- Body style: 2-door roadster 2-door coupe 2-door convertible 4-door touring sedan 4-door sedan
- Layout: FR layout
- Related: Chrysler Six; Chrysler Airstream; Chrysler Royal; Dodge Six; Plymouth Model PJ

Powertrain
- Engine: 174.9 cu in (2.9 L) DeSoto I6; 205.3 cu in (3.4 L) DeSoto I6; 217.8 cu in (3.6 L) DeSoto I6; 228.1 cu in (3.7 L) DeSoto I6; 236.7 cu in (3.9 L) DeSoto I6

Dimensions
- Wheelbase: 109.75 in (2,788 mm); 118 in (2,997 mm) (1935-36)

Chronology
- Successor: DeSoto Series S-10

The DeSoto Six was first introduced in 1929 and was badge engineered from the 1929 Chrysler Six Series 62 with the same 109.75 in (2,788 mm) wheelbase, while it offered a smaller 174.9 cu in (2.9 L) Chrysler I6 with an overall length of 169 in (4,293 mm). It was offered in four two-door sedan configurations and three four-door sedan body styles. It used the Series K designation for two years then was updated to the Series CK in mid-1930.

== 1929-1933 ==
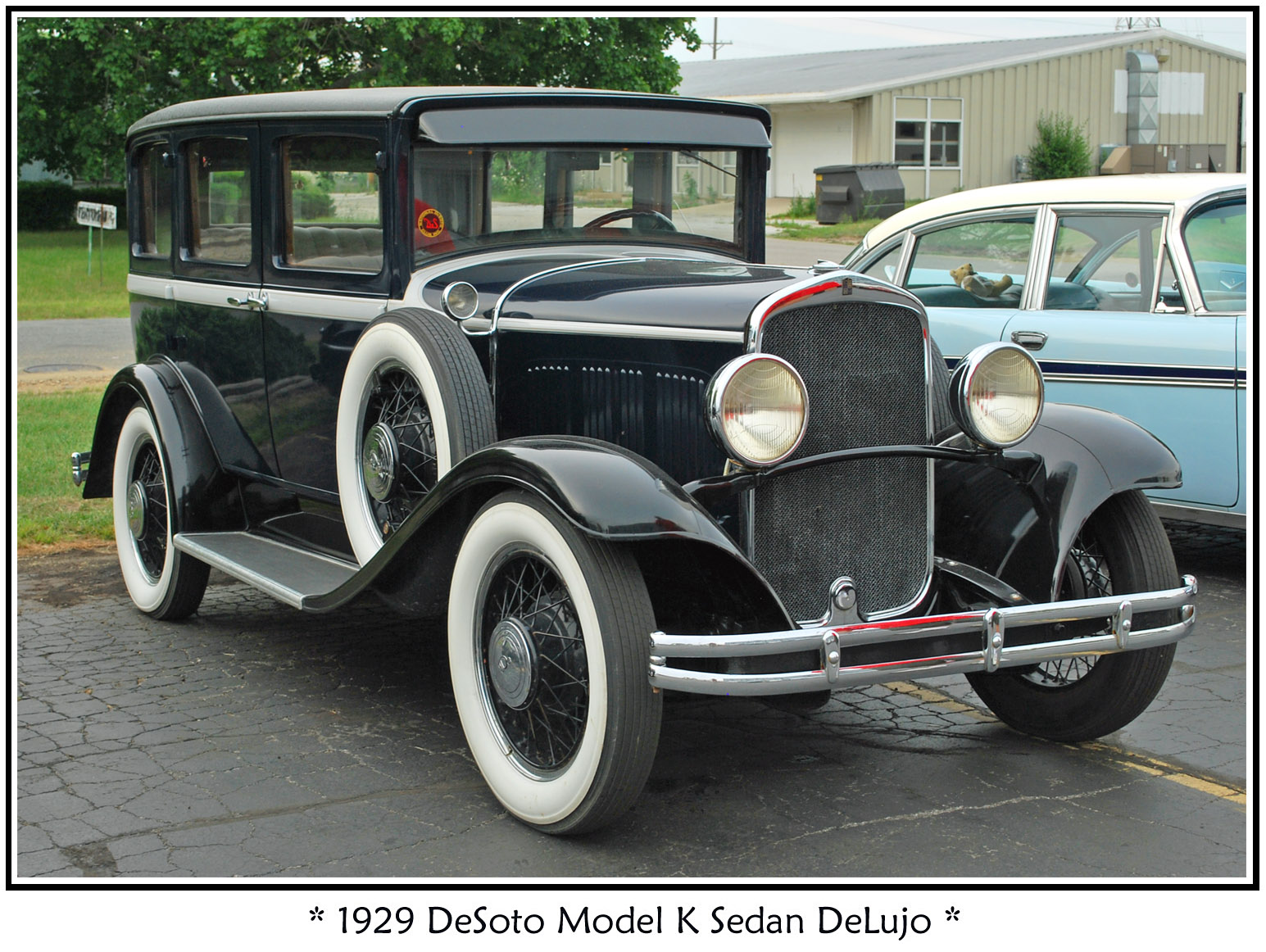
1929 DeSoto Six Series K DeLujo Sedan

The DeSoto Six Series K was introduced August 4, 1928 as a 1929 model. It was a badge engineered version of the 1928 Chrysler Six Series 60 offering the same body style choices of the Chrysler. In honor of Hernando de Soto's Spanish heritage, trim packages used the terms "cupe", "coche" and "de Lujo", or Spanish for "coupe", "coach" and "deluxe", while the roadster was called the "Roadster Espanol". By 1931 English terms were used for all models. The engine used was the Silver Dome while the roadster was offered with the high performance Red Head while the displacement was the same at 174.9 cu in (2.9 L) Chrysler I6. Hydraulic, 11 in (279 mm) four wheel drum brakes are attached to 19 in (483 mm) wood spoked wheels. Four, two-door body styles were offered and three, four-door body styles were offered including a touring car convertible were offered. All two-door choices were available for the same list price of $845 ($15,844 in 2025 dollars), while the DeLujo Sedan was the top model at $955 ($17,906 in 2025 dollars). The affordable price for a Chrysler Straight Six helped the successful introduction, setting a record sales pace and an all-time high for any American car at its introduction. The introduction of DeSoto benefited from Chrysler having entered and finished in the 1929 24 Hours of Le Mans which helped sales.

== 1935-1936 ==
The Desoto Series SF Airstream is an automobile that was built by DeSoto during model years 1935 and 1936. During both years, the car was sold along with the streamlined DeSoto Series SE Airflow. The DeSoto Airstream Series SF was sold for model year 1935, and was reidentified as the Series S-1 for 1936. The 4-door sedan sold for US$795 ($18,669 in 2025 dollars), or $220 less than a 4-door DeSoto Series SG Airflow which was listed at US$1,015 ($23,835 in 2025 dollars). Chrysler fielded its own Chrysler Airstream model concurrently; visual cues separated the two automobiles.

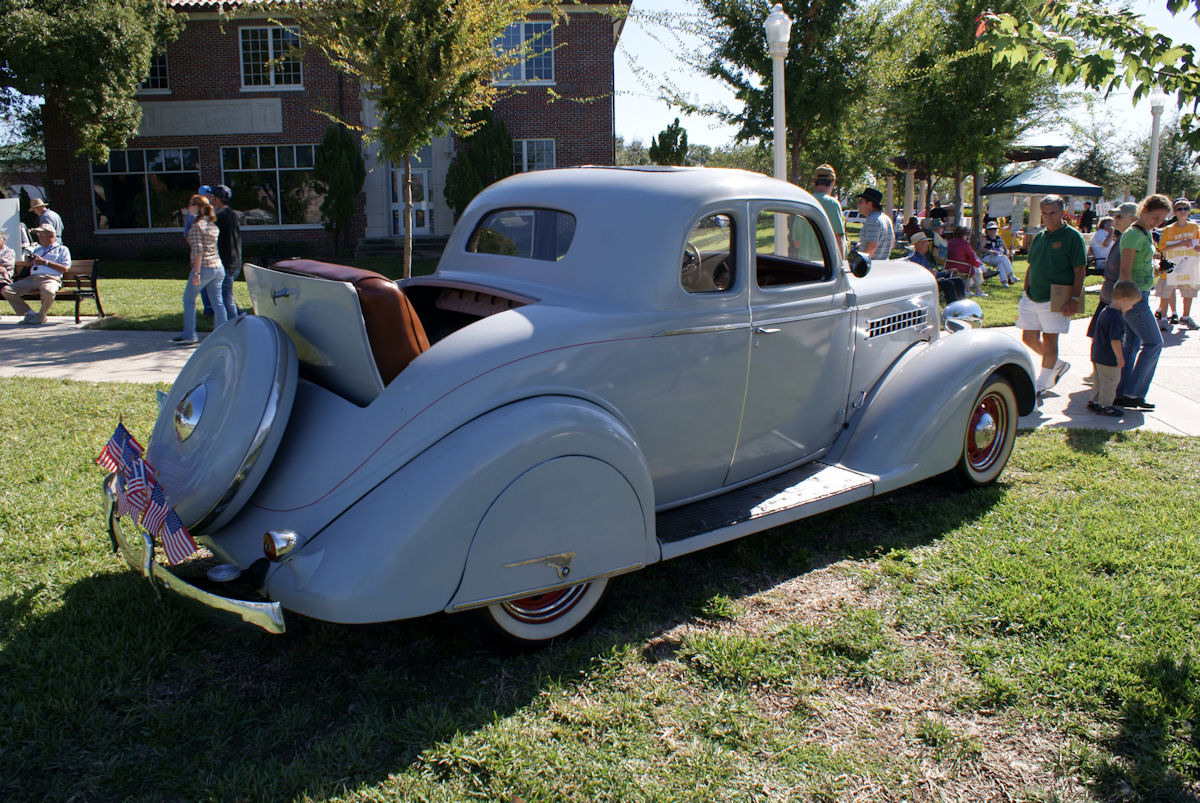
1935 DeSoto Airstream coupe

The Airstream was the modernized DeSoto Six Series SD, and was offered to recapture market share lost during the 1934 season when DeSoto only offered the Airflow. In 1935, there were 20,784 Airstream cars sold, as compared to 6,797 Airflow models. Airstream sales nearly doubled the units of Airflows, 13,940, sold in 1934. While streamlined and aerodynamic, the Airflow was not embraced by the public, and the more mainstream Airstream was introduced until the DeSoto Six nameplate returned in 1937 with the Series S-3. In reviewing the Airstream, conventionality was its best attribute. Solidly built, and more conservatively styled, the 241.5 cu in (4.0 L) Chrysler Straight-6 Airstream did away with the Airflow's integrated headlights, broad grille work and monocoque construction. While the superstructure of the Airstream was all-steel (as opposed to wooden framing - a practice still followed by some US automakers in the mid-1930s), the car rested on its frame, while Airflow's unibody build qualities placed the passenger compartment within the frame structure. It has a 118" wheelbase.

Body styles for 1935 included 2-door business coupe, convertible coupe, roadster coupe, 5-passenger coupe and trunkback sedan. Four-door offerings included a base sedan and a trunkback sedan. The cars featured Chrysler's vaunted “Floating Power” rubber engine mounts which isolated engine vibration from the chassis. Optional features included carpeting for the front seat area, radio, twin windshield wipers and a heater. Airstreams were priced about $200 less ($4,697 in 2025 dollars) than the DeSoto Airflow. That, plus the more traditional styling, made the car a success.

In 1936 the Airstream was split into two trim levels while being the same Series S-1, Deluxe and Custom. Deluxe models had one piece windshields while Customs (exp. the convertible) had two piece units which were quickly becoming the industry standard. The senior series also gained a Custom Traveler model, built on a stretched 130" wheelbase. Custom Travelers were popular with limousine conversion companies and marked the beginning of DeSoto's long standing, and profitable relationship with the taxicab industry.

For 1936 total sales improved to 38,938 units, of which the Airstream accounted for 33,938 units compared to the reduced Airflow offerings with returned 5,000 units for the Airflow's final year.

== See also ==
- DeSoto Airflow
- Chrysler Airstream
- Fahlin SF-2 Plymocoupe aircraft made from 1935 Plymouth coupe
