= Highland Park Ford Plant =

- U.S. National Register of Historic Places
- U.S. National Historic Landmark
- Michigan State Historic Site
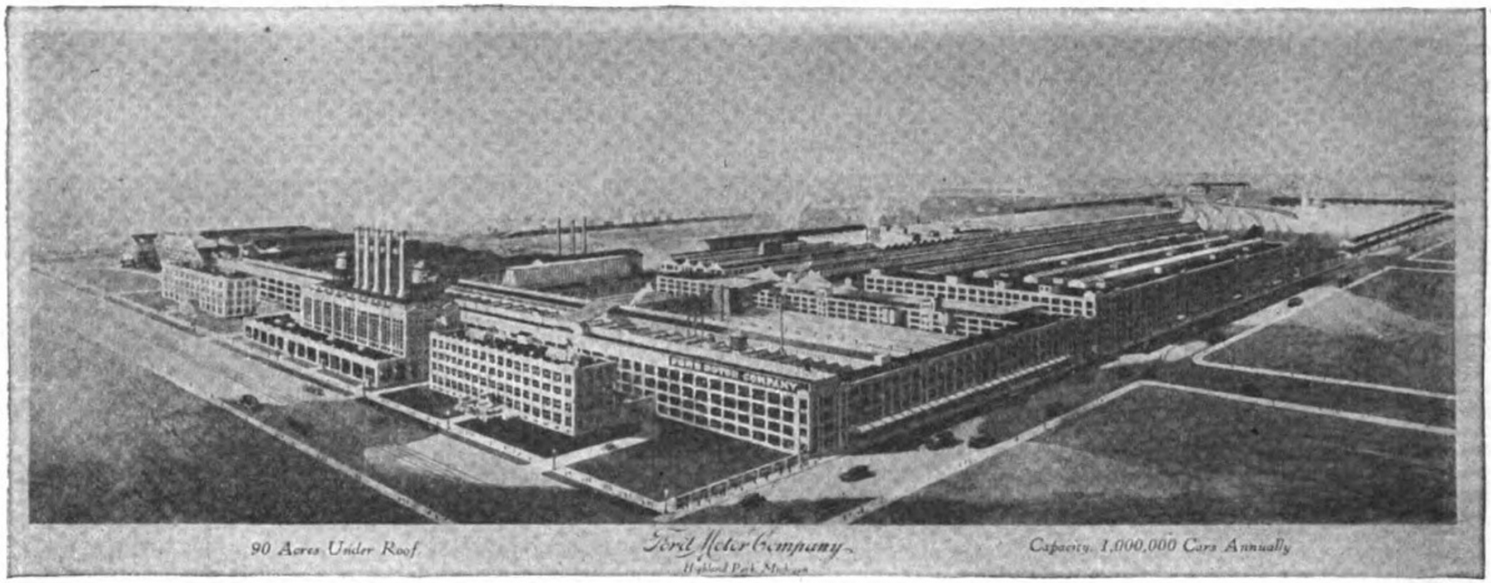
- The Highland Park plant in 1922

- Location within Michigan Location within the United States
- Interactive map
- Location: 91 Manchester Street at Woodward; Highland Park, Michigan
- Coordinates: 42.4105°N 83.0996°W
- Built: 1910
- Architects: Albert Kahn; Edward Gray
- NRHP reference No.: 73000961

Significant dates
- Added to NRHP: February 6, 1973
- Designated NHL: June 2, 1978
- Designated MSHS: April 17, 1956

The Highland Park Ford Plant is a historic former Ford Motor Company factory located at 91 Manchester Street (at Woodward Avenue) in Highland Park, Michigan. It was Ford's third factory and the second American Model T production facility, but the factory gained notoriety as the first factory in history to assemble automobiles on a moving assembly line. The Highland Park Ford Plant became a National Historic Landmark in 1978.

== History ==
Highland Park was designed by Albert Kahn Associates in 1908 and was opened in 1910. Ford automotive production had previously taken place at the Ford Piquette Avenue Plant, where the first Model Ts were built. The Highland Park Ford Plant was approximately 4 miles (6.4 km) northwest of the original Dodge Brothers factory who were subcontractors for Ford, producing precision engine and chassis components for the Model T. It was also approximately 1 mile (1.6 km) northwest of the former Brush-Maxwell plant, which later became Highland Park Chrysler Plant the headquarters for the Chrysler Corporation.

The complex included offices, factories, a power plant and a foundry as part of Ford's strategy of integrating the supply chain. About 102 acres in size the Highland Park Plant was the largest manufacturing facility in the world at the time of its opening. Because of its spacious design, it set the precedent for many factories and production plants built thereafter.

External images
- Ford Model T price/volume curve, 1909-1923
- Ford statistics, 1910-1931

Using division of labor, rigorous cost-cutting and process optimization, the factory went through an experience curve to reduce price and increase volume. On October 7, 1913, the Highland Park Ford Plant became the first automobile production facility in the world to implement the moving assembly line. The new assembly line improved production time of the Model T from 728 to 93 minutes. The Highland Park assembly line lowered the price of the Model T from $700 (equivalent to $24,187 in 2025) in 1910 to $350 (equivalent to $8,795 in 2025) in 1917, making it an affordable automobile for most Americans. On January 5, 1914, Ford announced that factory wages would be raised from a daily rate of $2.34 (equivalent to $75 in 2025) to $5.00 (equivalent to $161 in 2025), and that daily shifts would be reduced from nine hours to eight. After the increase in pay, Ford claimed that the turnover rate of 31.9 percent in 1913 decreased to 1.4 percent in 1915. Ford offered nearly three times the wages paid at other unskilled manufacturing plants.

In the late 1920s, the open Model T went out of fashion and Ford moved automobile assembly to the River Rouge Plant complex in nearby Dearborn to focus on improving quality with the Model A. Automotive trim manufacturing and Fordson tractor assembly continued at the Highland Park plant. The 1,690 M4A3 Sherman tanks built by Ford from June, 1942 to September, 1943 were assembled in this factory, as well.

During the 1940s through 1960s, the Highland Park plant was a principal location for Ford U.S. tractor manufacture. In the 1970s, the Ford Romeo Engine Plant increasingly displaced it for that role.

Ford sold their building and began leasing the space in 1981. Throughout the 1980s parts of the factory were dismantled and torn down, including a large factory building, the boiler building and the administrative building.

By the mid-1990s neither plant was producing tractors or tractor parts, as Ford had sold off its tractor and implement interests in stages during the 1990-1993 period.

During the 2010s large portions of steel-framed warehouse buildings were scrapped in favor of a stock yard for tenants. Other companies occupying this property included a scrap yard and a cement plant.

By 2011, Ford used the facility to store documents and artefacts for the Henry Ford Museum. A portion is also occupied by a Forman Mills clothing warehouse that opened in 2006.

== Current status ==
The Woodward Avenue Action Association has a purchase agreement with the complex's owner, National Equity Corp., to pay $550,000 for two of eight buildings at the historic Ford manufacturing complex: a four-floor, 40,000-square-foot sales office and the 8,000-square-foot executive garage near it. The center would include a theater with continuous videos, informational kiosks, interpretive displays on automotive history and a gift/coffee/snack shop. It could also be a place where visitors could pick up historical automotive tours, such as the current tour offered by the Woodward group, "In the Steps of Henry".

The former factory is now a mall, named Model-T-Plaza; the mall features architectural features recalling the location's origin.

The remaining buildings W, X, Y, and Z at Highland Industrial Center occupy about 1.3 million square feet, and 10 parcels of land go to this site, which was formerly owned by the Woodland-Manchester Corp, and is now currently leased by a security company. No further businesses occupy the lot behind the factory building, as of 2021.

== In the media ==
The plant was used as a location for director Shawn Levy's 2011 Disney/Touchstone Pictures film Real Steel.

== Gallery ==
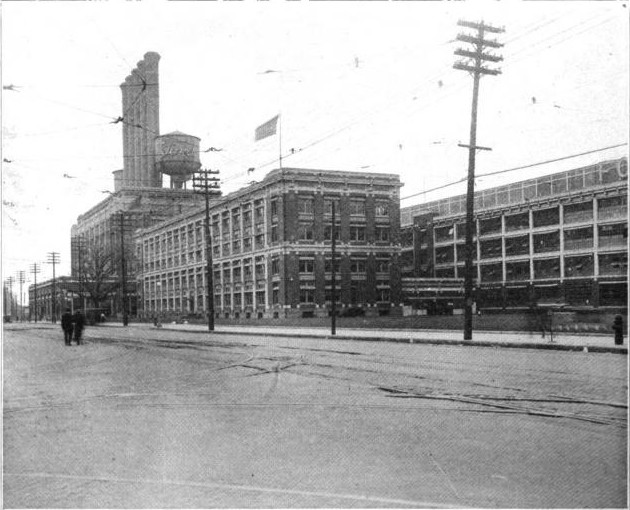
Highland Park Ford plant, c. 1922

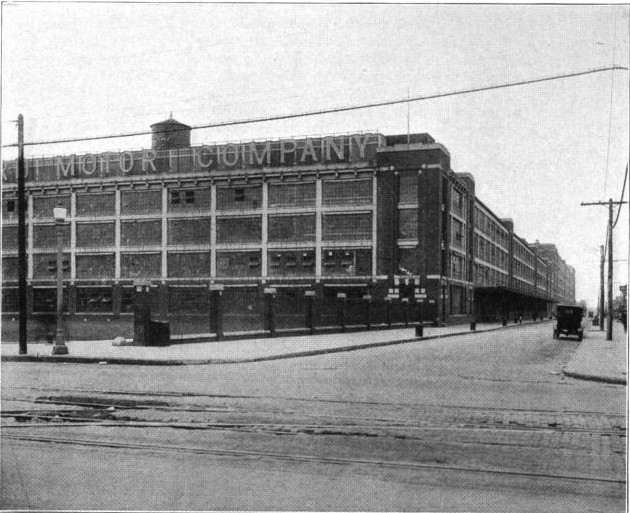
Highland Park Ford plant, c. 1922

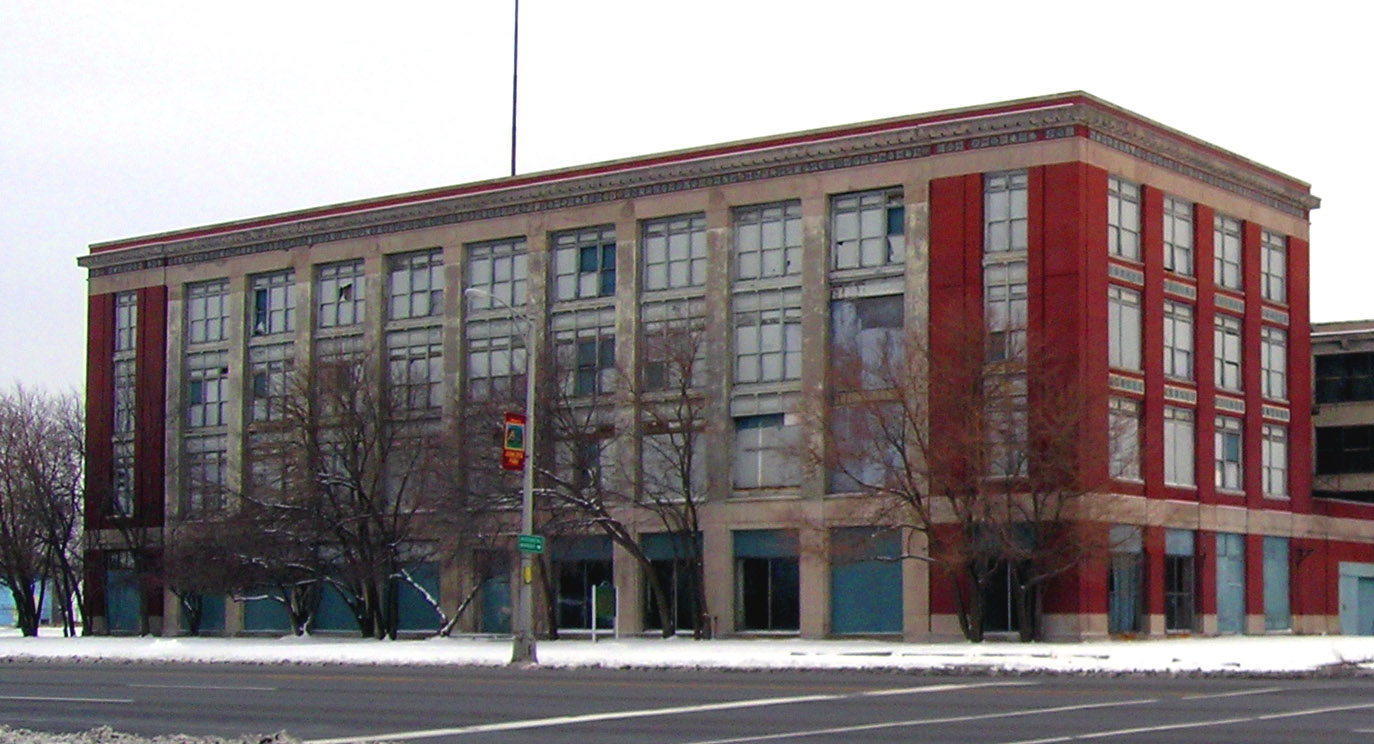

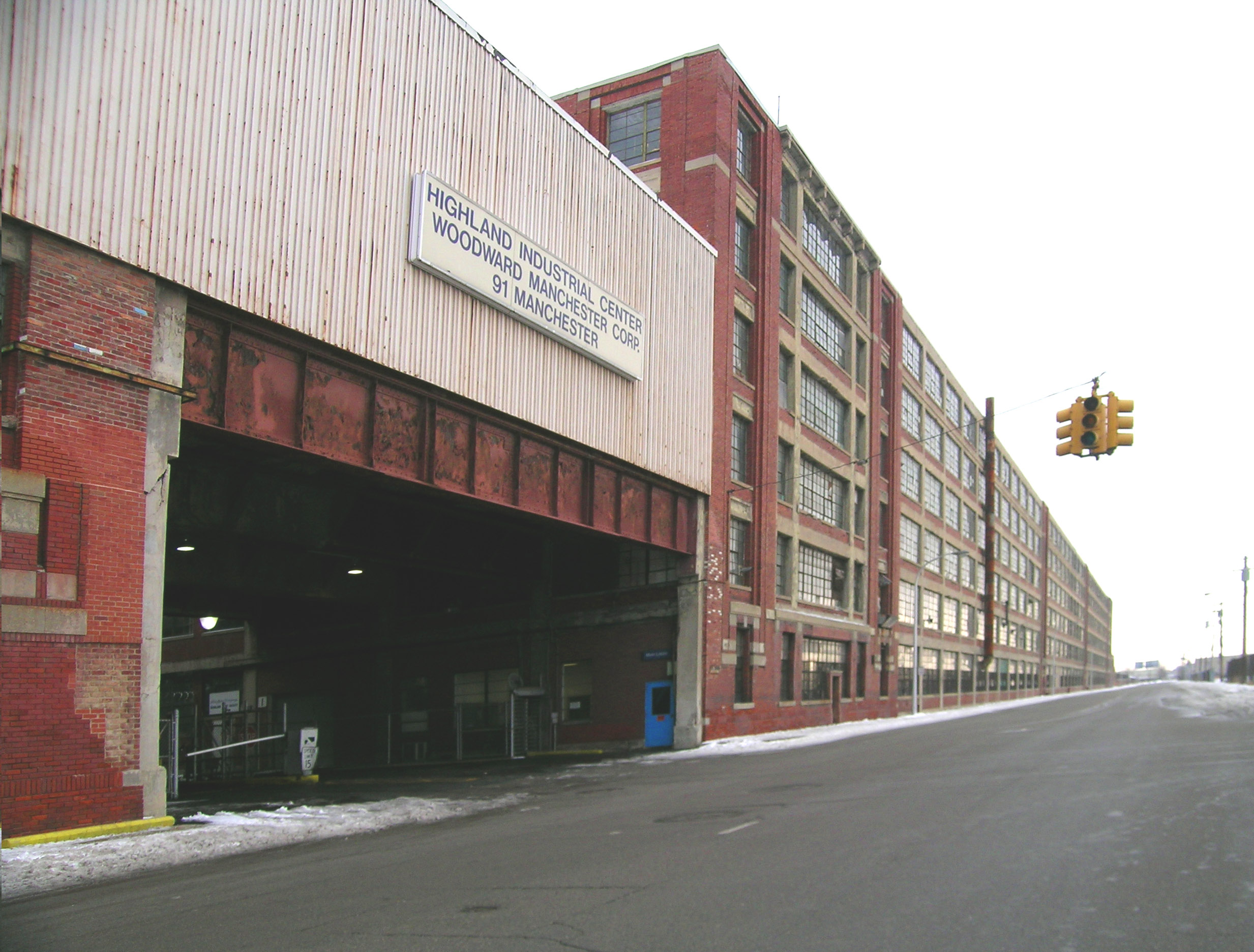
South side streetscape of the Highland Park Ford plant complex

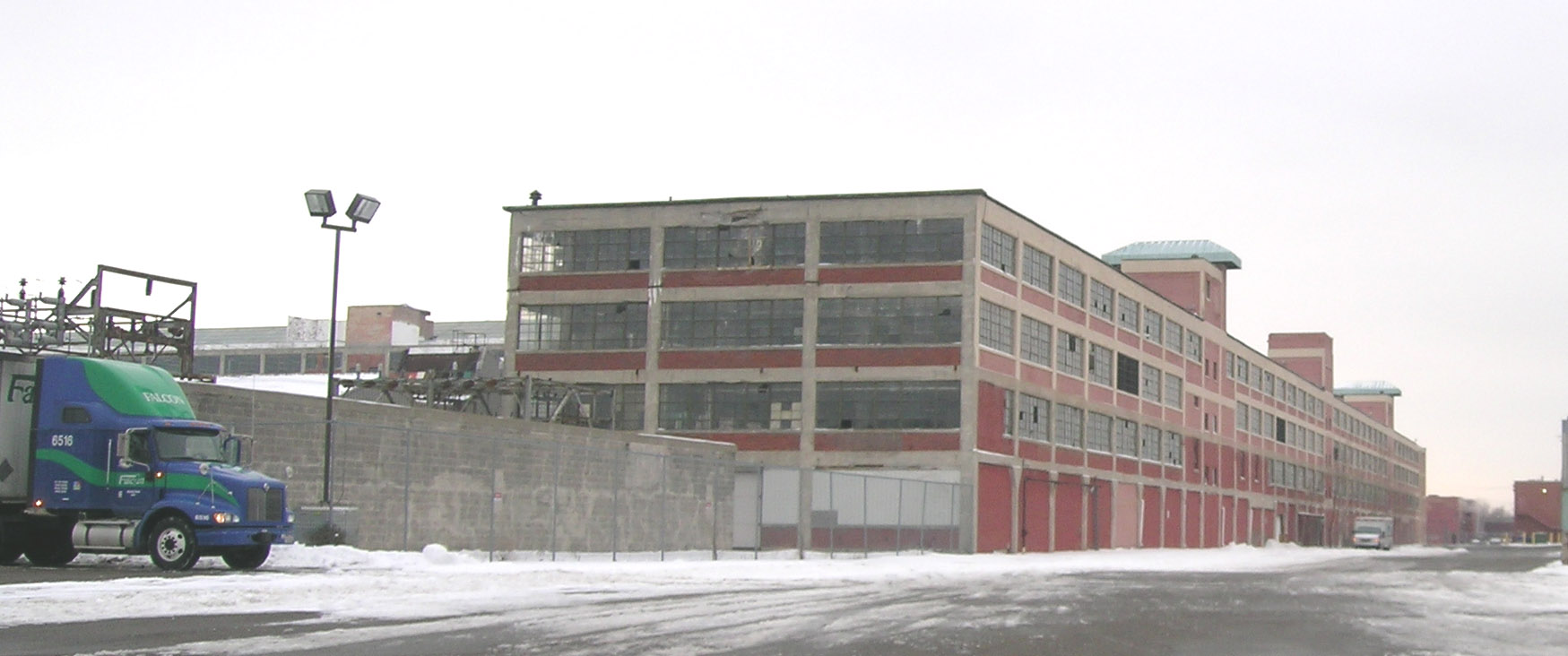
Large building that is part of the Ford plant complex (now the Highland Park Industrial Center)

== See also ==
- List of Ford factories
