= Highland Park Chrysler Plant =

Car factory in Detroit, Michigan, U.S.

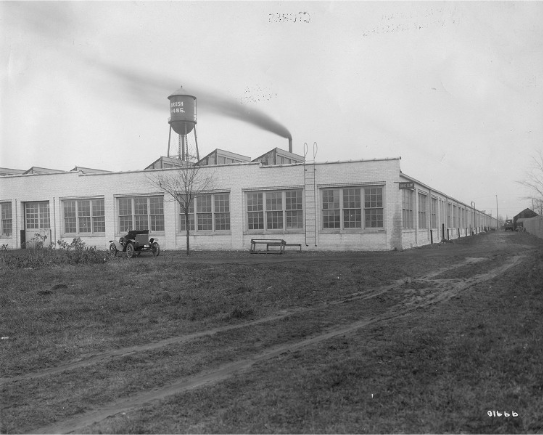
- The factory in 1911
- Operated: 1907–1996
- Location: 12568 Oakland Ave; Detroit
- Coordinates: 42.40048°N 83.08052°W
- Industry: Automotive
- Products: Automobiles
- Owners: Brush Motor (1907–1913); Chrysler (1934–1996)
- Defunct: 1996; 30 years ago

The Highland Park Chrysler Plant, located in Detroit, was the original headquarters campus of the Chrysler Corporation, which was originally the Brush Motor Car Company factory location until through a series of acquisitions, became the property of Chrysler. It was the location of research and development, and at one time, the location of a wind tunnel that was used to develop the Chrysler Airflow and other subsequent models like the Chrysler Turbine Car. It was closed when Chrysler moved into their current Chrysler World Headquarters and Technology Center in Auburn Hills, Metro Detroit, Michigan in 1996.

The address was at 12000 Chrysler Service Drive. It was off the Chrysler Freeway (I-75) and Davison Freeway (Route 8), with Brush Street one block away, and predated the formation of Chrysler Corporation itself. The facility was used to improve product development efficiency, increase the ease of inter-departmental collaboration, and create a more satisfying workplace. It was approximately 1 mile (1.6 km) southeast from the Highland Park Ford Plant. It was approximately 2 miles (3.2 km) northwest of the former Dodge Factory in Hamtramck, Michigan, and 5 miles (8.0 km) northwest of the Jefferson North Assembly.

It was the assembly location of the Chrysler Imperial Airflow, Chrysler Airflow, and the DeSoto Airflow from 1934 until 1937 on a dedicated factory assembly.

The facility was demolished and reclaimed and is now the location of several businesses. Chrysler still maintains a presence at the former campus called FCA Detroit Office Warehouse.
