= Ford Model T =

American car (1908–1927)

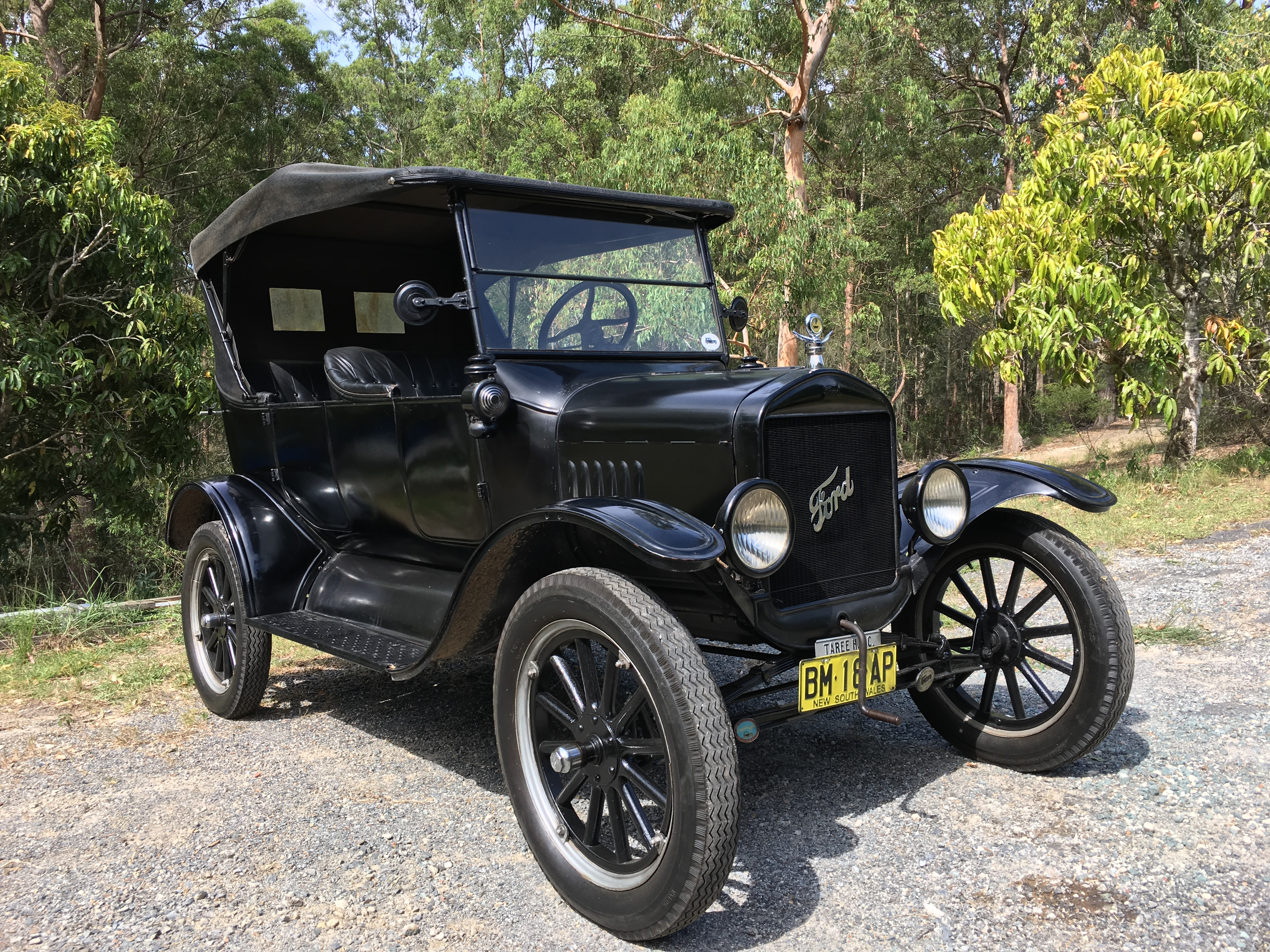
- 1925 Ford Model T Touring Car

Overview
- Manufacturer: Ford Motor Company
- Production: October 1908 – August 1927
- Assembly: List: United States: Detroit, Michigan; Highland Park, Michigan; Dothan, Alabama; Atlanta, Georgia; Denver, Colorado; Los Angeles, California; San Francisco, California; Minneapolis, Minnesota; Saint Paul, Minnesota; St. Louis, Missouri; Kansas City, Missouri; Seattle, Washington; Portland, Oregon; Omaha, Nebraska; Buffalo, New York; Long Island City, New York; Cincinnati, Ohio; Cleveland, Ohio; Columbus, Ohio; Hamilton, Ohio; Dallas, Texas; Houston, Texas; Fort Worth, Texas; Jacksonville, Florida; New Orleans Louisiana; Des Moines, Iowa; Cambridge, Massachusetts; Chicago, Illinois; Charlotte, North Carolina; Fargo, North Dakota; Indianapolis, Indiana; Louisville, Kentucky; Memphis, Tennessee; Milwaukee, Wisconsin; Philadelphia, Pennsylvania; Pittsburgh, Pennsylvania; Kearny, New Jersey; Oklahoma City, Oklahoma; Alexandria, Virginia; Norfolk, Virginia; Salt Lake City, Utah; Argentina: Buenos Aires; Australia: Adelaide, South Australia; Brisbane, Queensland; Fremantle, Western Australia; Geelong, Victoria; Brazil: São Bernardo do Campo, São Paulo; Canada: Toronto, Ontario, Walkerville, Ontario, Winnipeg, Manitoba; Montreal, Quebec; Vancouver, British Columbia; Chile: Santiago; Denmark: Copenhagen; France: Bordeaux and Asnières-sur-Seine; Germany: Berlin; Ireland: Cork; Italy: Trieste; Japan: Yokohama; Mexico: Mexico City; Norway: Bergen; Spain: Cádiz and Barcelona; South Africa: Port Elizabeth; United Kingdom: Manchester
- Designer: Childe Harold Wills, main-engineer Joseph A. Galamb and Eugene Farkas

Body and chassis
- Class: Economy car
- Body style: List: 2-door touring (1909–1911); 3-door touring (1912–1925); 4-door touring (1926–27); no door roadster (1909–1911); 1-door roadster (1912–1925); 2-door roadster (1926–27); roadster pickup (1925–1927); 2-door coupé (1909–1912, 1917–1927); 2-door Coupelet (1915–1917); Town car (1909–1918); C-cab wagon (1912); 2-(center) door sedan (1915–1923); 2-door sedan (1924–1927); 4-door sedan (1923–1927); Separate chassis were available all years from independent coachbuilders
- Layout: FMR layout

Powertrain
- Engine: 177 C.I.D. (2.9 L) 20 hp I4
- Transmission: 2-speed planetary gear

Dimensions
- Wheelbase: 100.0 in (2,540 mm)
- Length: 134 in (3,404 mm)
- Width: 1,676 mm (66.0 in) (1912 roadster)
- Height: 1,860 mm (73.2 in) (1912 roadster)
- Curb weight: 1,200–1,650 lb (540–750 kg)

Chronology
- Predecessor: Ford Model N (1906–1908)
- Successor: Ford Model A (1927–1932)

The Ford Model T is an automobile that was produced by the Ford Motor Company from October 1, 1908, to May 26, 1927. It is generally regarded as the first mass-affordable automobile, which made car travel available to middle-class Americans. The relatively low price was partly the result of Ford's efficient fabrication, including assembly line production instead of individual handcrafting. The savings from mass production allowed the price to decline from $780 in 1910 (equivalent to $26,952 in 2025) to $290 in 1924 ($5,448 in 2025 dollars). It was mainly designed by three engineers, Joseph A. Galamb (the main engineer), Eugene Farkas, and Childe Harold Wills. The Model T was colloquially known as the "Tin Lizzie".

The Ford Model T was named the most influential car of the 20th century in the 1999 Car of the Century competition, ahead of the BMC Mini, Citroën DS, and Volkswagen Beetle. Ford's Model T was successful not only because it provided inexpensive transportation on a massive scale, but also because the car signified innovation for the rising middle class and became a powerful symbol of the United States' age of modernization. With over 15 million sold, it was the most sold car in history before being surpassed by the Volkswagen Beetle in 1972.

== Introduction ==
Early automobiles, which were produced from the 1880s, were mostly scarce, expensive, and often unreliable. Being the first reliable, easily maintained, mass-market motorized transportation turned the Model T into a great success: Within 2 days after release, 15,000 orders were placed. The first production Model T was built on August 12, 1908, and left the factory on September 27, 1908, at the Ford Piquette Avenue Plant in Detroit, Michigan. On May 26, 1927, Henry Ford watched the 15 millionth Model T Ford roll off the assembly line at his factory in Highland Park, Michigan.

Henry Ford conceived a series of cars between the founding of the company in 1903 and the introduction of the Model T. Ford named his first car the Model A and proceeded through the alphabet up through the Model T. Twenty models in all, not all of which went into production. The production model immediately before the Model T was the Model S, an upgraded version of the company's largest success to that point, the Model N. The follow-up to the Model T was another Ford Model A, rather than the "Model U". The company publicly stated this was because the new car was such a departure from the old that Ford wanted to start all over again with the letter A.

The Model T was Ford's first automobile mass-produced on moving assembly lines with completely interchangeable parts, marketed to the middle class. Henry Ford said of the vehicle:

I will build a motor car for the great multitude. It will be large enough for the family, but small enough for the individual to run and care for. It will be constructed of the best materials, by the best men to be hired, after the simplest designs that modern engineering can devise. But it will be so low in price that no man making a good salary will be unable to own one – and enjoy with his family the blessing of hours of pleasure in God's great open spaces.

Although Ransom E. Olds developed the assembly line for the first mass-produced automobile, the Oldsmobile Curved Dash, having begun in 1901, Ford and his engineers developed tremendous advances in the efficiency of the system over the life of the Model T.

== Characteristics and design ==
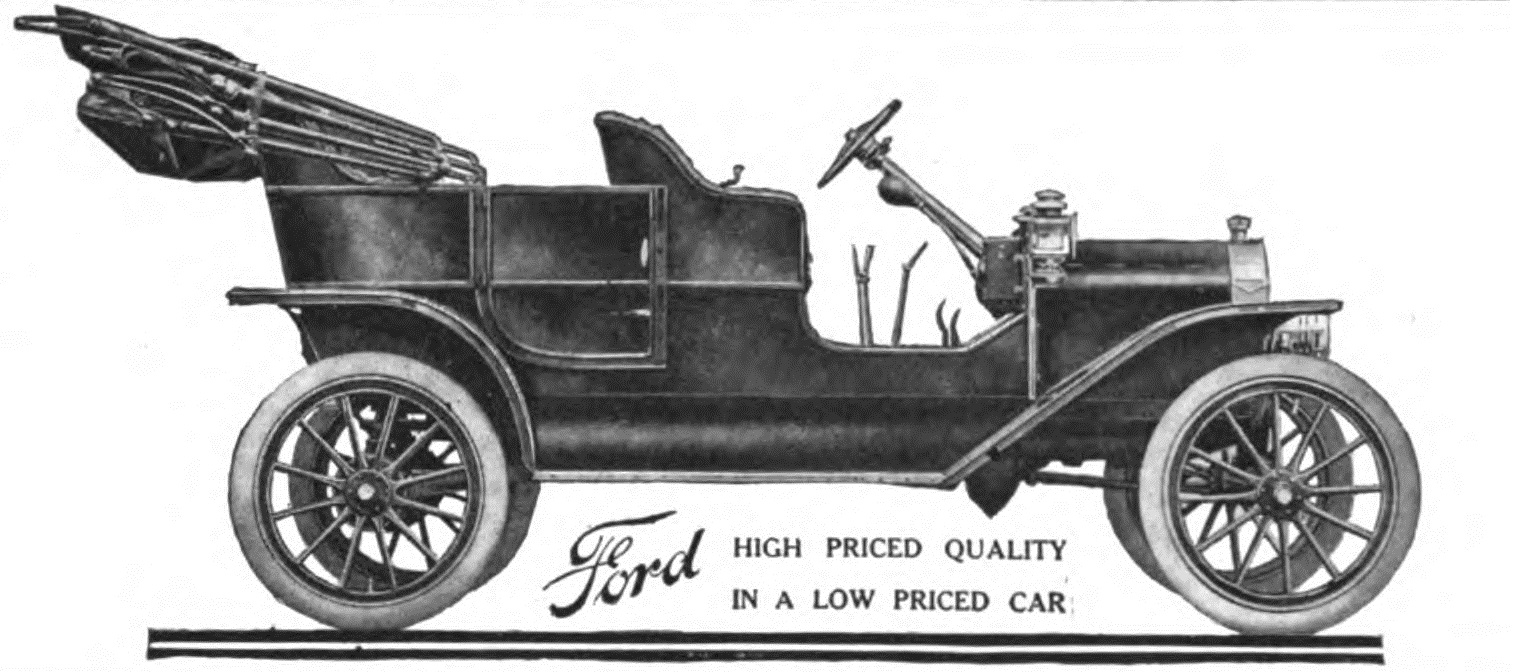
1908 Ford Model T advertisement

The Model T was designed by Childe Harold Wills, and Hungarian immigrants Joseph A. Galamb (main engineer) and Eugene Farkas. Henry Love, C. J. Smith, Gus Degner and Peter E. Martin were also part of the team, as were Galamb's fellow Hungarian immigrants Gyula Hartenberger and Károly Balogh. Henry Ford supervised the designers himself. Production of the Model T began in the third quarter of 1908. Collectors today sometimes classify Model Ts by build years and refer to these as "model years", thus labeling the first Model Ts as 1909 models. This is a retroactive classification scheme; the concept of model years as understood today did not exist at the time. Even though design revisions occurred during the car's two decades of production, the company gave no particular name to any of the revised designs; all of them were called simply "Model T".

=== Engine ===
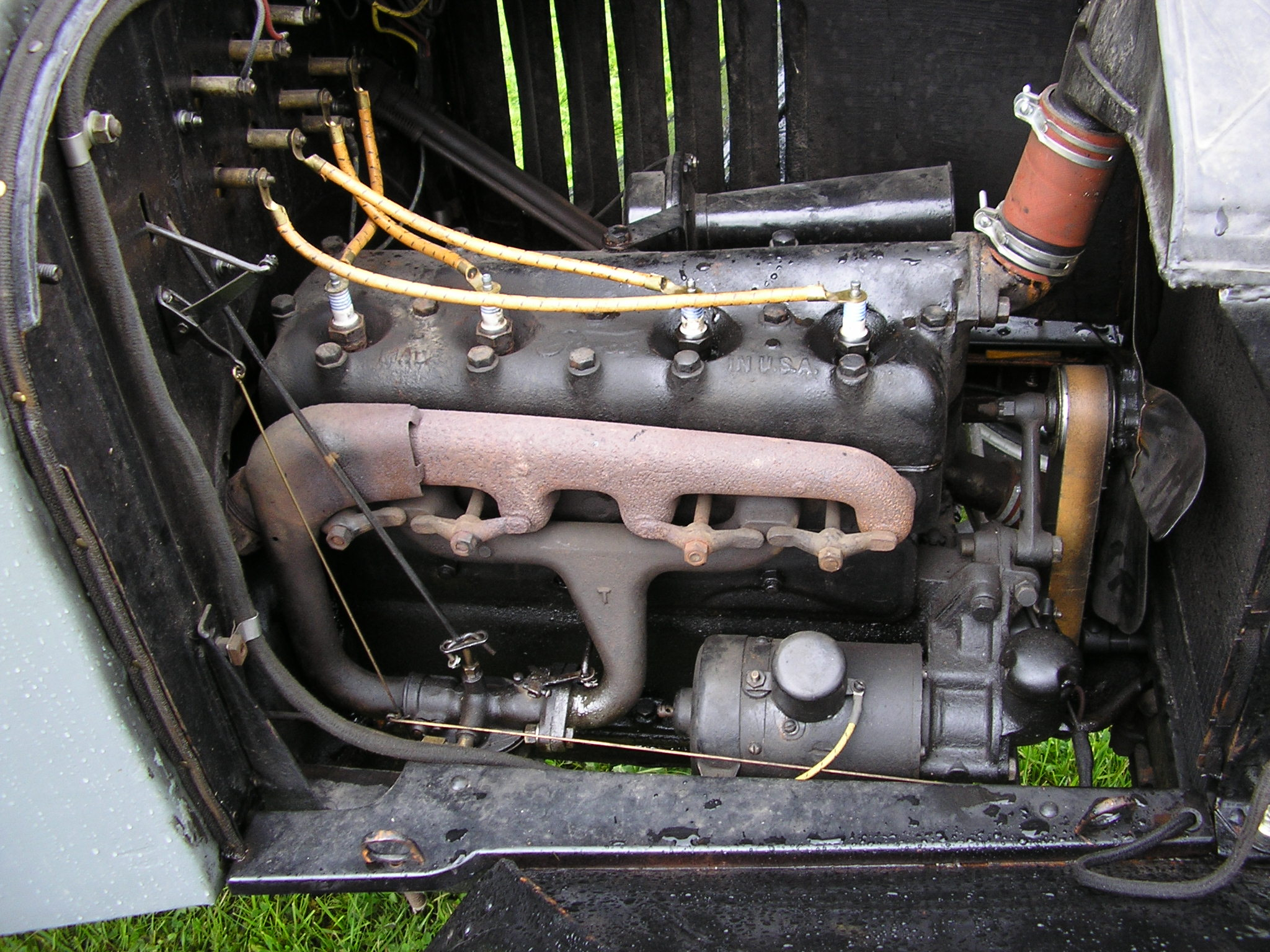
Model T engine

The Model T has a front-mounted 177-cubic-inch (2.9 L) inline four-cylinder engine, producing 20 hp (15 kW), for a top speed of 42 mph (68 km/h). According to Ford Motor Company, the Model T had fuel economy of 13–21 mpg_{‑US} (16–25 mpg_{‑imp}; 18–11 L/100 km). The engine was designed to run on gasoline, although it was able to run on kerosene or ethanol, although the decreasing cost of gasoline and the later introduction of Prohibition made ethanol an impractical fuel for most users. The engines of the first 2,447 units were cooled with water pumps; the engines of unit 2,448 and onward, with a few exceptions prior to around unit 2,500, were cooled by thermosiphon action.

The ignition system used in the Model T was an unusual one, with a low-voltage magneto incorporated in the flywheel, supplying alternating current to trembler coils to drive the spark plugs. This was closer to that used for stationary gas engines than the expensive high-voltage ignition magnetos that were used on some other cars. This ignition also made the Model T more flexible as to the quality or type of fuel it used. The system did not need a starting battery, since proper hand-cranking would generate enough current for starting. Electric lighting powered by the magneto was adopted in 1915, replacing acetylene gas flame lamp and oil lamps, but electric starting was not offered until 1919.

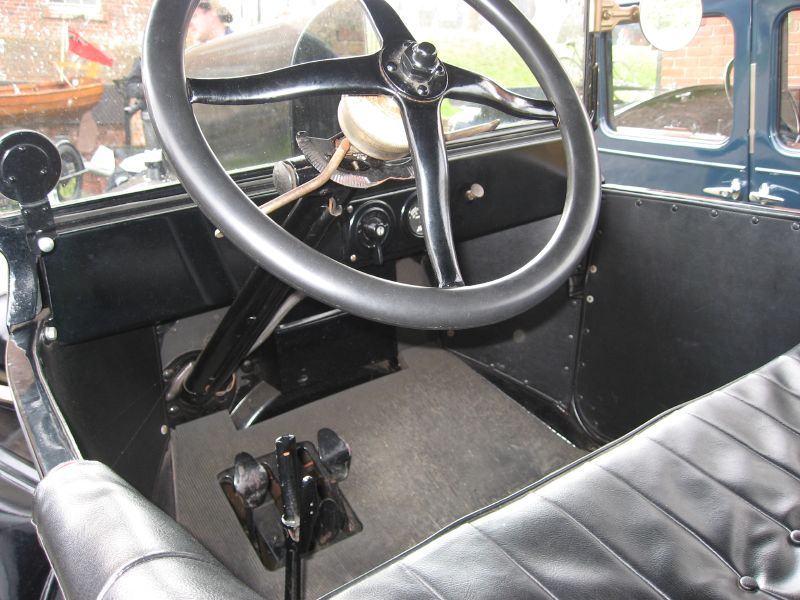
View of the driver's controls, 1920 Model T

The Model T engine was produced for replacement needs as well as stationary and marine applications until 1941, well after production of the Model T ended.

The Fordson Model F tractor engine, that was designed about a decade later, was very similar to, but larger than, the Model T engine.

=== Transmission and drive train ===
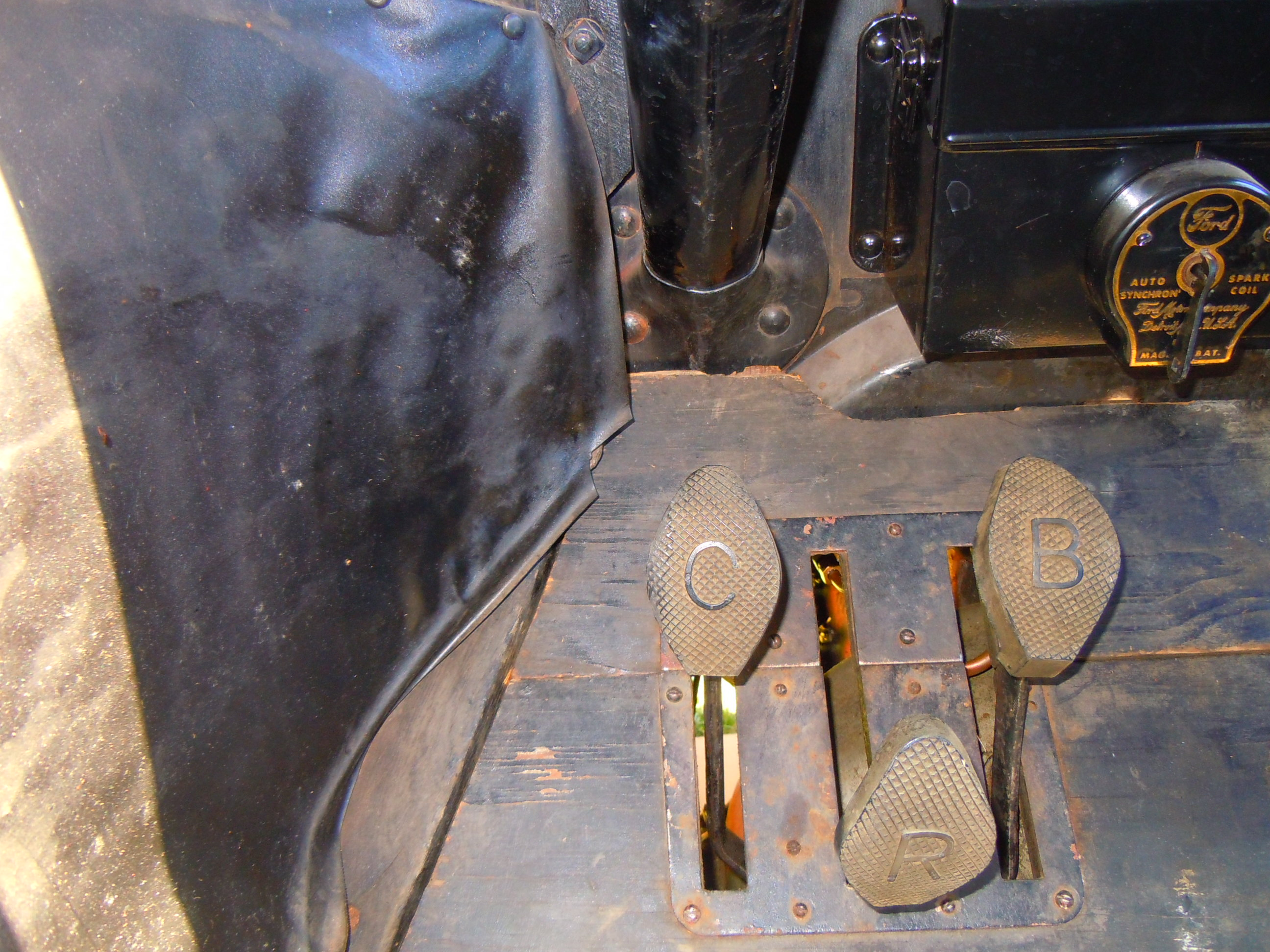
The three pedals of the Model T with corresponding initials (L-R): clutch, reverse, and brake

The Model T is a rear-wheel drive vehicle. Its transmission is a planetary gear type known (at the time) as "three speed". In today's terms it is considered a two-speed, because one of the three speeds is reverse.

The Model T's transmission is controlled with three floor-mounted pedals, a revolutionary feature for its time, and a lever mounted to the road side of the driver's seat. The throttle is controlled with a lever on the steering wheel. The left-hand pedal is used to engage the transmission. With the floor lever in either the mid position or fully forward and the pedal pressed and held forward, the car enters low gear. When held in an intermediate position, the car is in neutral. If the left pedal is released, the Model T enters high gear, but only when the lever is fully forward – in any other position, the pedal only moves up as far as the central neutral position. This allows the car to be held in neutral while the driver cranks the engine by hand. The car can thus cruise without the driver having to press any of the pedals.

In the first 800 units, reverse is engaged with a lever; all units after that use the central pedal, which is used to engage reverse gear when the car is in neutral. The right-hand pedal operates the transmission brake – there are no brakes on the wheels. The floor lever also controls the parking brake, which is activated by pulling the lever all the way back. This doubles as an emergency brake.

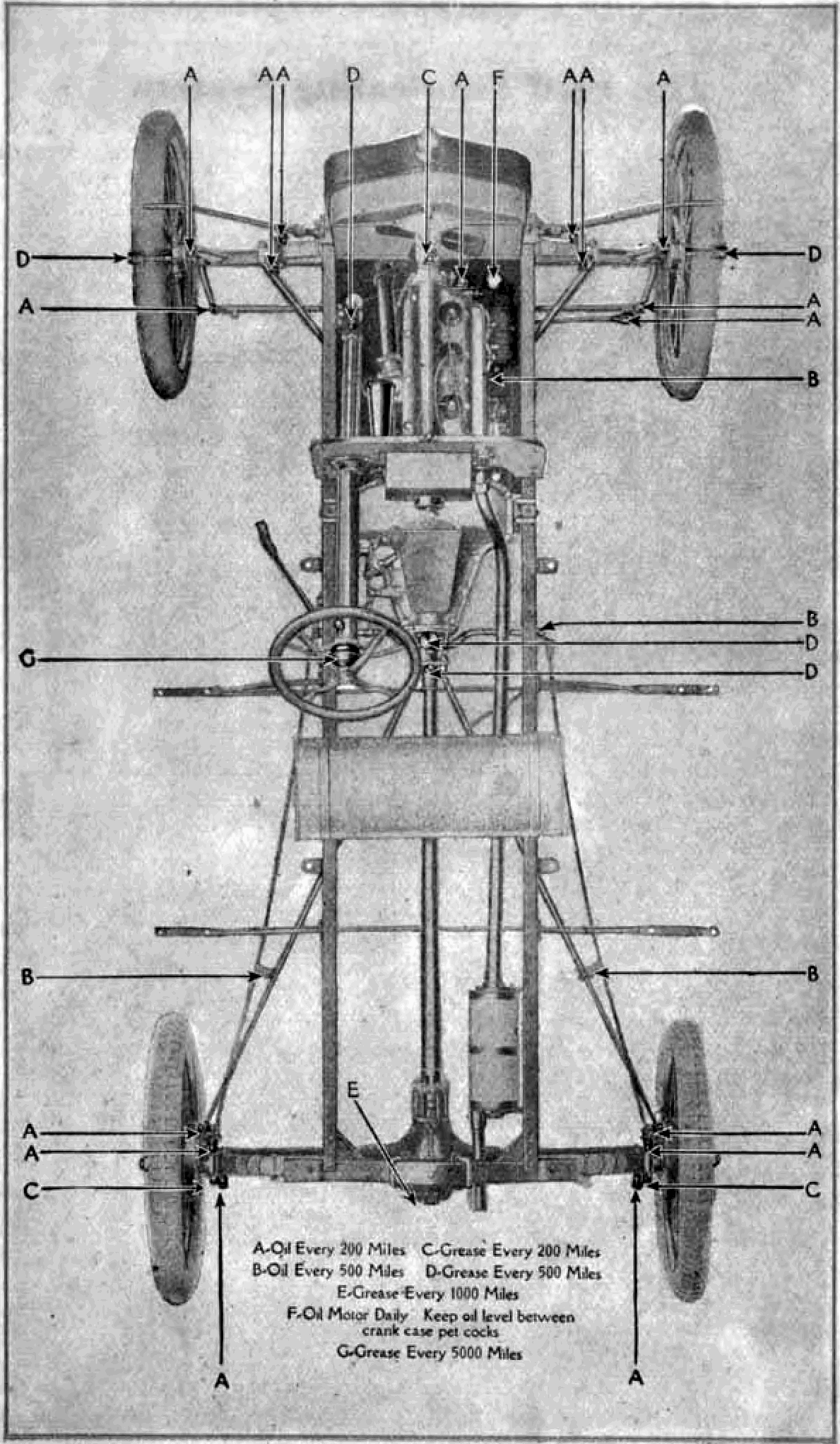
Model T rolling chassis – top view

Although it was uncommon, the drive bands could fall out of adjustment, allowing the car to creep, particularly when cold, adding another hazard to attempting to start the car: a person cranking the engine could be forced backward while still holding the crank as the car crept forward, although it was nominally in neutral. As the car utilizes a wet clutch, this condition could also occur in cold weather, when the thickened oil prevents the clutch discs from slipping freely. Power reaches the differential through a single universal joint attached to a torque tube which drives the rear axle; some models (typically trucks, but available for cars, as well) could be equipped with an optional two-speed rear Ruckstell axle, shifted by a floor-mounted lever which provides an underdrive gear for easier hill climbing.

==== Chassis / frame ====
The heavy-duty Model TT truck chassis came with a special worm gear rear differential with lower gearing than the normal car and truck, giving more pulling power but a lower top speed (the frame is also stronger; the cab and engine are the same). A Model TT is easily identifiable by the cylindrical housing for the worm-drive over the axle differential. All gears are vanadium steel running in an oil bath.

==== Transmission bands and linings ====
Two main types of band lining material were used:

- Cotton – Cotton woven linings were the original type fitted and specified by Ford. Generally, the cotton lining is "kinder" to the drum surface, with damage to the drum caused only by the retaining rivets scoring the drum surface. Although this in itself did not pose a problem, a dragging band resulting from improper adjustment caused overheating of the transmission and engine, diminished power, and – in the case of cotton linings – rapid destruction of the band lining.
- Wood – Wooden linings were originally offered as a "longer life" accessory part during the life of the Model T. They were a single piece of steam-bent wood and metal wire, fitted to the normal Model T transmission band. These bands give a very different feel to the pedals, with much more of a "bite" feel. The sensation is of a definite "grip" of the drum and seemed to noticeably increase the feel, in particular of the brake drum.

==== Aftermarket transmissions and drives ====
During the Model T's production run, particularly after 1916, more than 30 manufacturers offered auxiliary transmissions or drives to substitute for, or enhance, the Model T's drivetrain gears. Some offered overdrive for greater speed and efficiency, while others offered underdrives for more torque (often incorrectly described as "power") to enable hauling or pulling greater loads. Among the most noted were the Ruckstell two-speed rear axle, and transmissions by Muncie, Warford, and Jumbo.

Aftermarket transmissions generally fit one of four categories:

- Replacement transmission – usually a sliding gear/selective transmission, intended as a direct replacement for Ford's planetary-gear transmission.
- Front-mounted auxiliary transmission – designed to fit between the engine and Ford's transmission, to add additional gear ratios.
- Rear-mounted auxiliary transmission – mounted at the rear axle housing, and attached between it and the driveshaft, to add additional gear ratios.
- Multi-speed axle – designed to fit inside the differential's housing, to add additional gear ratios.

Murray Fahnestock, a Ford expert in the era of the Model T, particularly advised the use of auxiliary transmissions for the enclosed Model T's, such as the Ford Sedan and Coupelet, for three reasons: their greater weight put more strain on the drivetrain and engine, which auxiliary transmissions could smooth out; their bodies acted as sounding boards, echoing engine noise and vibration at higher engine speeds, which could be lessened with intermediate gears; and owners of the enclosed cars spent more to buy them, and thus likely had more money to enhance them.

He also noted that auxiliary transmissions were valuable for Ford Ton-Trucks in commercial use, allowing for driving speeds to vary with their widely variable loads – particularly when returning empty – possibly saving as much as 50% of returning drive time.

=== Suspension and wheels ===
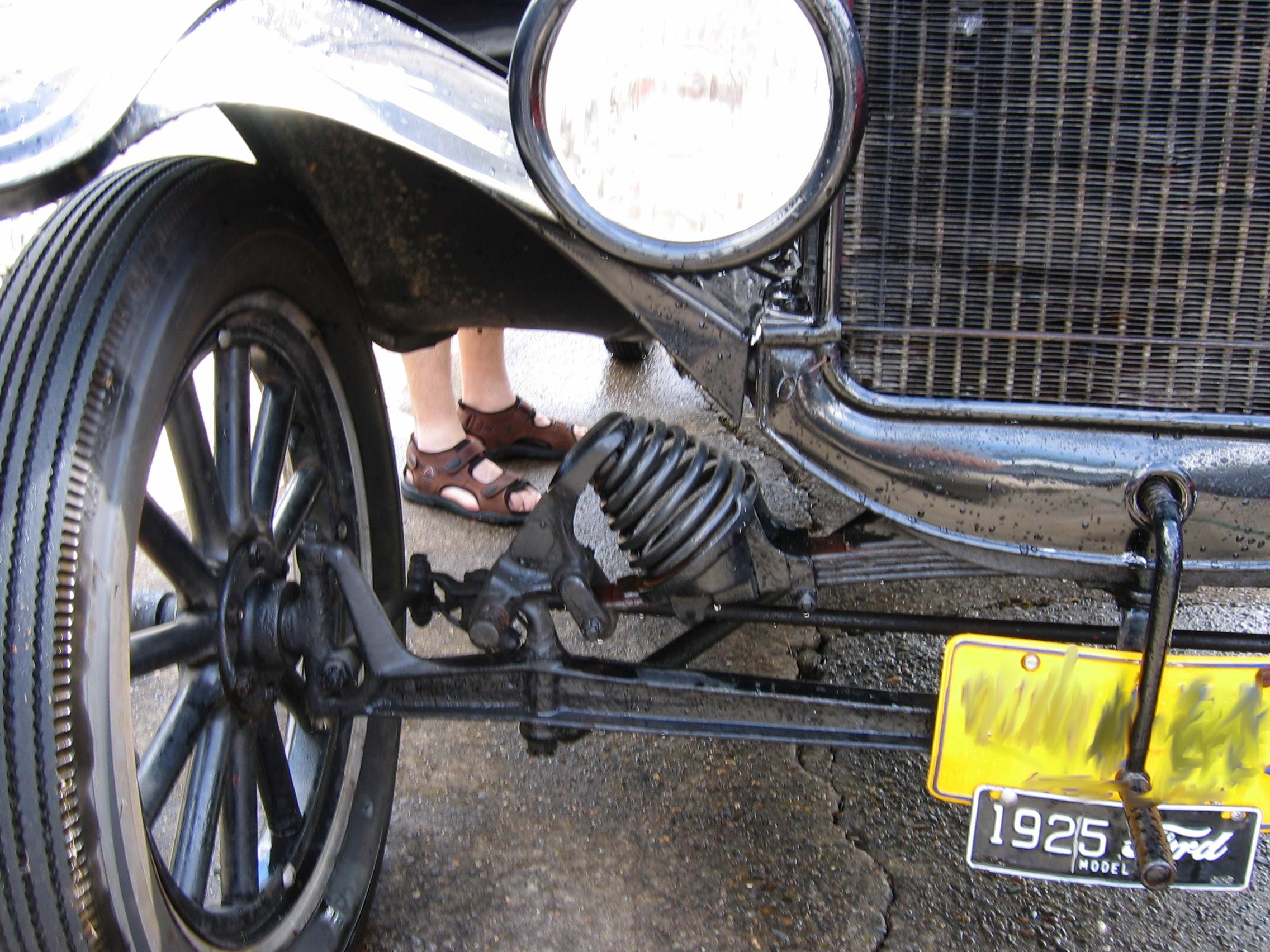
The suspension components of a Ford Model T. The coil-spring device is an aftermarket accessory, the "Hassler shock absorber".

Model T suspension employed a transversely mounted semi-elliptical spring for each of the front and rear beam axles, which allowed a great deal of wheel movement to cope with the dirt roads of the time.

The front axle was drop forged as a single piece of vanadium steel. Ford twisted many axles through eight full rotations (2880 degrees) and sent them to dealers to be put on display to demonstrate its superiority.

The Model T did not have a modern service brake. The right foot pedal applied a band around a drum in the transmission, thus stopping the rear wheels from turning. The previously mentioned parking brake lever operated band brakes acting on the inside of the rear brake drums, which were an integral part of the rear wheel hubs. Optional brakes that acted on the outside of the brake drums were available from aftermarket suppliers.

Wheels were wooden artillery wheels, with steel welded-spoke wheels available in 1926 and 1927.

Tires were pneumatic clincher type, 30 in (762 mm) in diameter, 3.5 in (89 mm) wide in the rear, 3 in (76 mm) in the front. Clinchers needed much higher pressure than today's tires, typically 60 psi (410 kPa), to prevent them from leaving the rim at speed. Flat tires were a common problem.

Balloon tires became available in 1925. They were 21 in × 4.5 in (530 mm × 110 mm) all around. Balloon tires were closer in design to today's tires, with steel wires reinforcing the tire bead, making lower pressure possible – typically 35 psi (240 kPa) – giving a softer ride. The steering gear ratio was changed from 4:1 to 5:1 with the introduction of balloon tires. The old nomenclature for tire size changed from measuring the outer diameter to measuring the rim diameter so 21 in (530 mm) (rim diameter) × 4.5 in (110 mm) (tire width) wheels has about the same outer diameter as 30 in (760 mm) clincher tires. All tires in this time period used an inner tube to hold the pressurized air; tubeless tires were not generally in use until much later.

Wheelbase is 100 in (254 cm) and standard track width was 56 in (142 cm) – 60 in (152 cm) track could be obtained on special order, "for Southern roads," identical to the pre-Civil War track gauge for many railroads in the former Confederacy. The standard 56-inch track being very near the 4 ft 8 1/2 in (143.5 cm) inch standard railroad track gauge, meant that Model Ts could be, and frequently were, fitted with flanged wheels and used as motorized railway vehicles or "speeders". The availability of a 60 in (152 cm) version meant the same could be done on the few remaining Southern 5 ft (152 cm) railways – these being the only nonstandard lines remaining, except for a few narrow-gauge lines of various sizes. Although a Model T could be adapted to run on track as narrow as 2 ft (61 cm) gauge (Wiscasset, Waterville and Farmington RR, Maine has one), this was a more complex alteration.

=== Colors ===
By 1918, half of all the cars in the U.S. were Model Ts. In his autobiography, Ford reported that in 1909 he told his management team, "Any customer can have a car painted any color that he wants so long as it is black."

However, in the first years of production from 1908 to 1913, the Model T was not available in black, but rather only in gray, green, blue, and red. Green was available for the touring cars, town cars, coupes, and Landaulets. Gray was available for the town cars only and red only for the touring cars. By 1912, all cars were being painted midnight blue with black fenders. Only in 1914 was the "any color so long as it is black" policy finally implemented.

It is often stated Ford suggested the use of black from 1914 to 1925 due to the low cost, durability, and faster drying time of black paint in that era. There is no evidence that black dried any faster than any other dark varnishes used at the time for painting, but carbon black pigment was indeed one of the cheapest (if not the cheapest) available, and dark color of gilsonite, a form of bitumen making cheap metal paints of the time durable, limited the (final) color options to dark shades of maroon, blue, green or black. At that period Ford used two similar types of the so-called Japan black paint, one as a basic coat applied directly to the metal and another as a final finish.

Paint choices in the American automotive industry, as well as in others (including locomotives, furniture, bicycles, and the rapidly expanding field of electrical appliances), were shaped by the development of the chemical industry. These included the disruption of dye sources during World War I and the advent, by the mid-1920s, of new nitrocellulose lacquers that were faster-drying and more scratch-resistant and obviated the need for multiple coats. Understanding the choice of paints for the Model T era and the years immediately following requires an understanding of the contemporaneous chemical industry.

During the lifetime production of the Model T, over 30 types of black paint were used on various parts of the car. These were formulated to satisfy the different means of applying the paint to the various parts, and had distinct drying times, depending on the part, paint, and method of drying.

=== Body ===
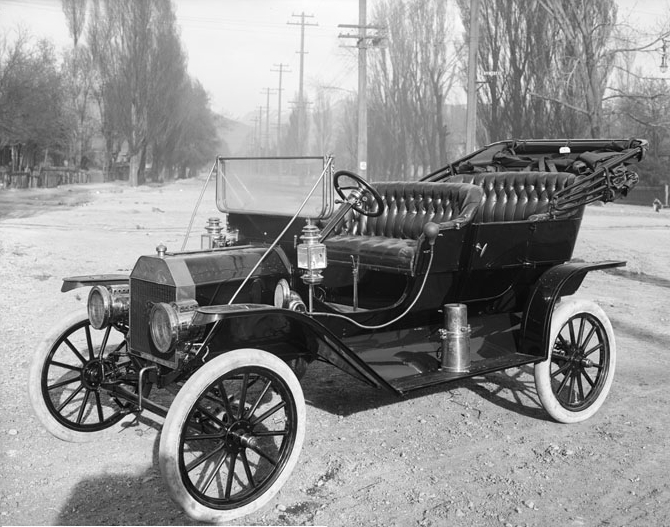
1910 Model T, photographed in Salt Lake City

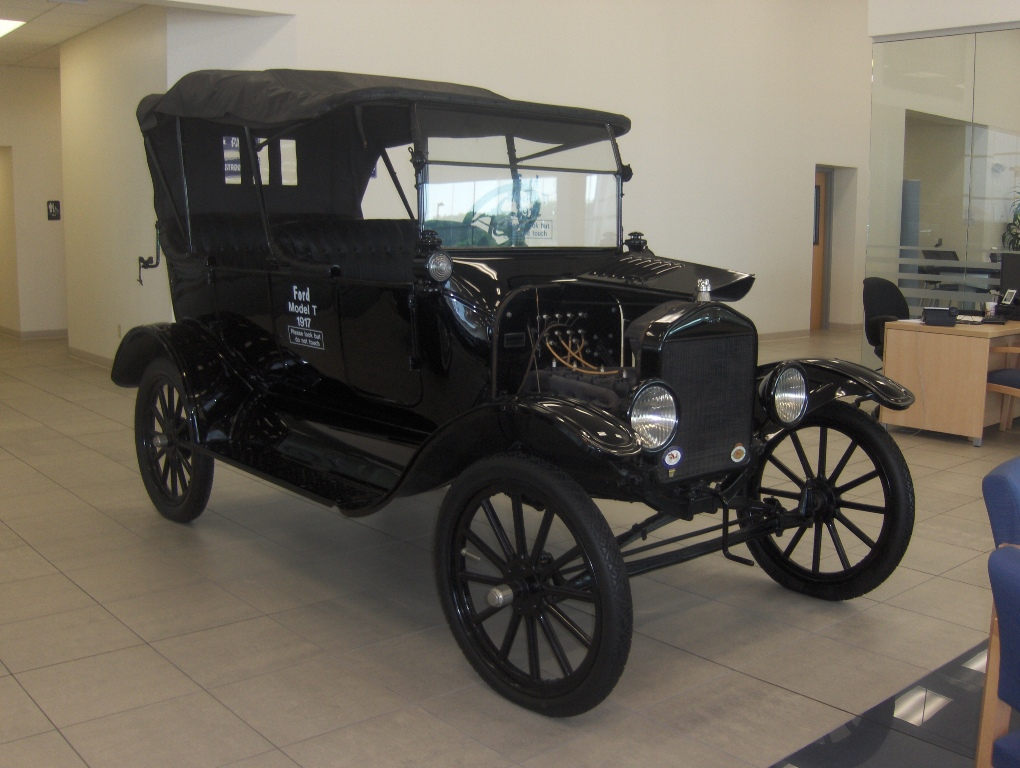
1917 Model T

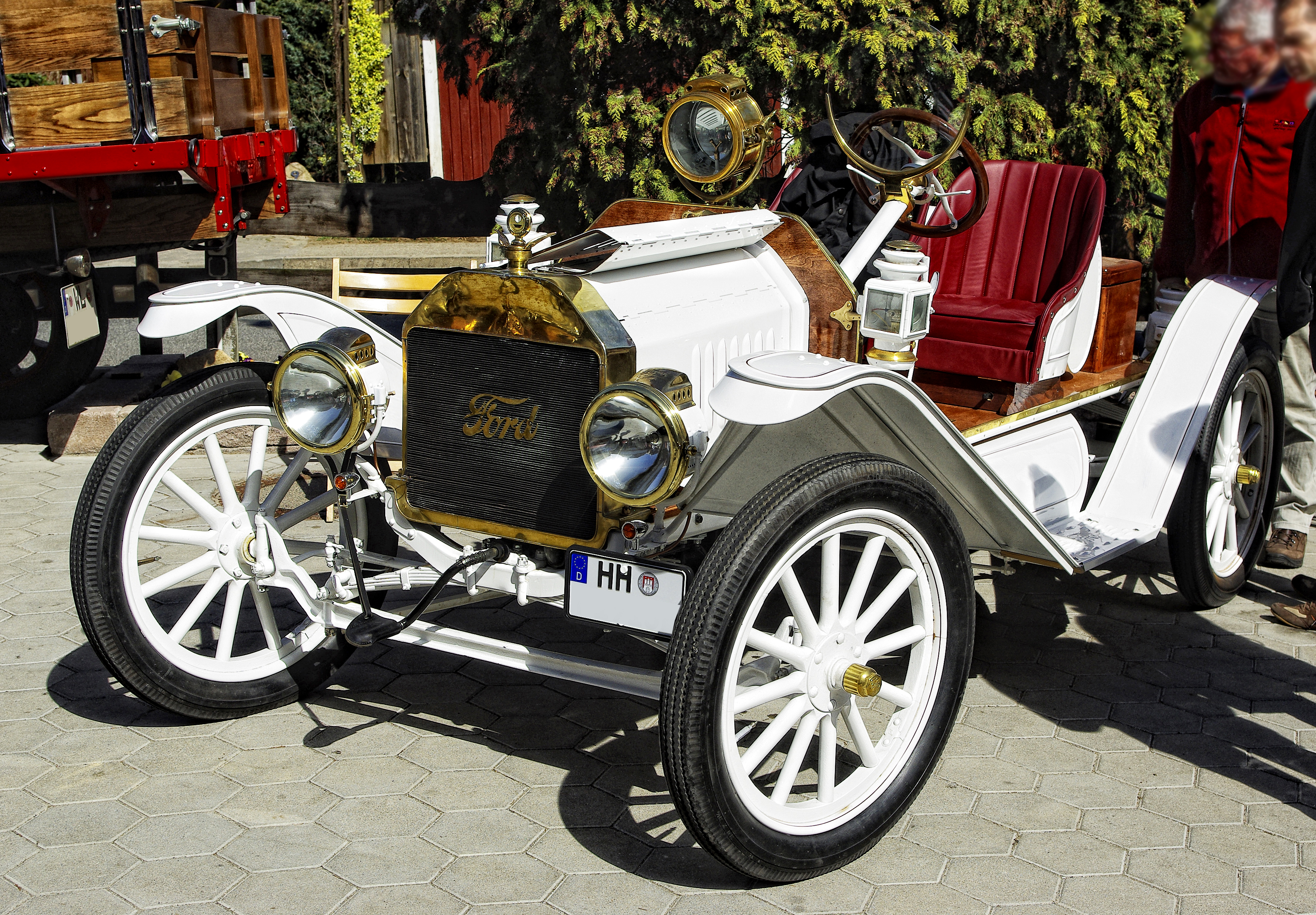
1915 Model T Speedster

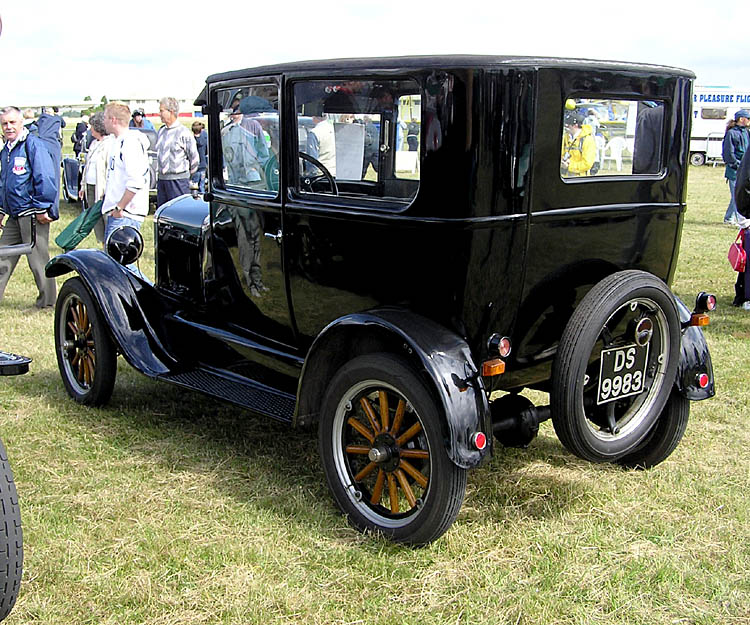
1925 Ford "New Model" T Tudor sedan

Although Ford classified the Model T with a single letter designation throughout its entire life and made no distinction by model years, enough significant changes to the body were made over the production life that the car may be classified into several style generations. The most immediately visible and identifiable changes were in the hood and cowl areas, although many other modifications were made to the vehicle.

- 1909–1914 – Characterized by a nearly straight, five-sided hood, with a flat top containing a center hinge and two side sloping sections containing the folding hinges. The firewall is flat from the windshield down with no distinct cowl. For these years, acetylene gas flame headlights were used because the flame is resistant to wind and rain. Thick concave mirrors combined with magnifying lenses projected the acetylene flame light. The fuel tank is placed under the front seat.
- 1915–1916 – The hood design is nearly the same five-sided design with the only obvious change being the addition of louvers to the vertical sides. A significant change to the cowl area occurred with the windshield relocated significantly behind the firewall and joined with a compound-contoured cowl panel. In these years electric headlights replaced carbide headlights.
- 1917–1923 – The hood design was changed to a tapered design with a curved top. The folding hinges were now located at the joint between the flat sides and the curved top. This is sometimes referred to as the "low hood" to distinguish it from the later hoods. The back edge of the hood now met the front edge of the cowl panel so that no part of the flat firewall was visible outside of the hood. This design was used the longest and during the highest production years, accounting for about half of the total number of Model Ts built.
- 1923–1925 – This change was made during the 1923 calendar year, so models built earlier in the year have the older design, while later vehicles have the newer design. The taper of the hood was increased and the rear section at the firewall is about an inch taller and several inches wider than the previous design. While this is a relatively minor change, the parts between the third and fourth generations are not interchangeable.
- 1926–1927 – This design change made the greatest difference in the appearance of the car. The hood was again enlarged, with the cowl panel no longer a compound curve and blended much more with the line of the hood. The distance between the firewall and the windshield was also increased significantly. This style is sometimes referred to as the "high hood".

The styling on the last "generation" was a preview for the following Model A, but the two models are visually quite different, as the body on the A is much wider and has curved doors as opposed to the flat doors on the T.

=== Diverse applications ===
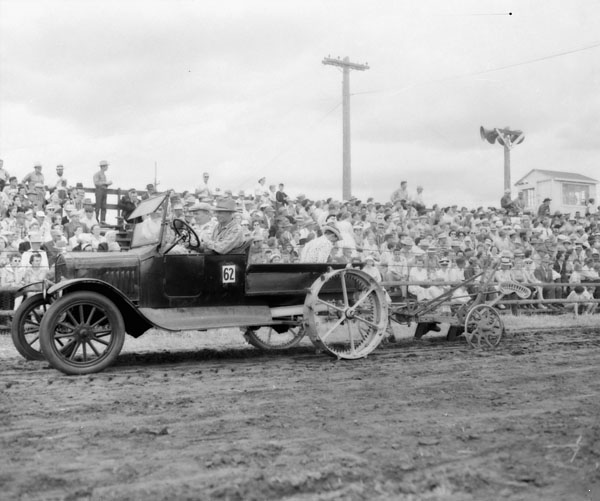
A Model T homemade tractor pulling a plow

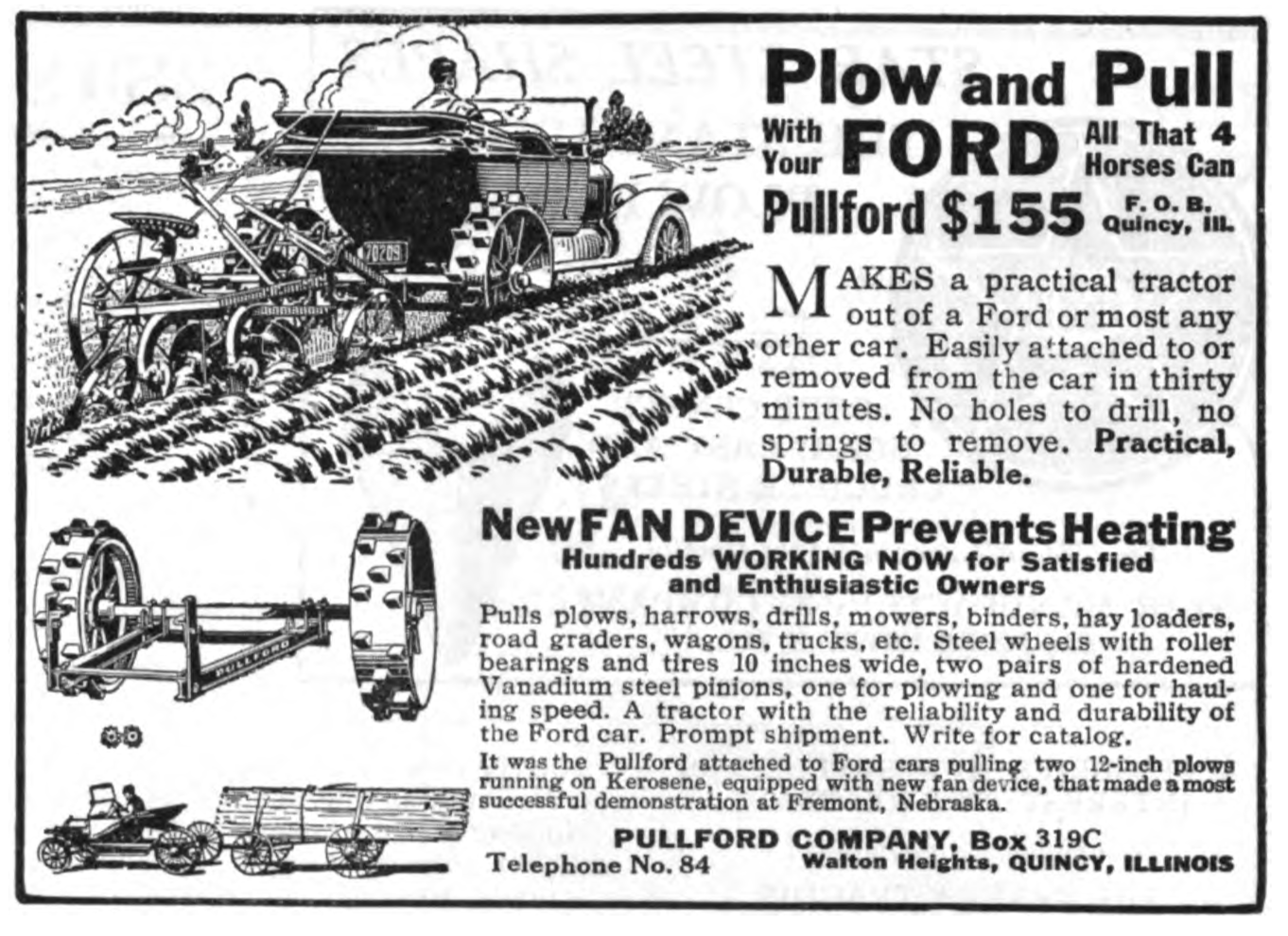
Pullford auto-to-tractor conversion advertisement, 1918

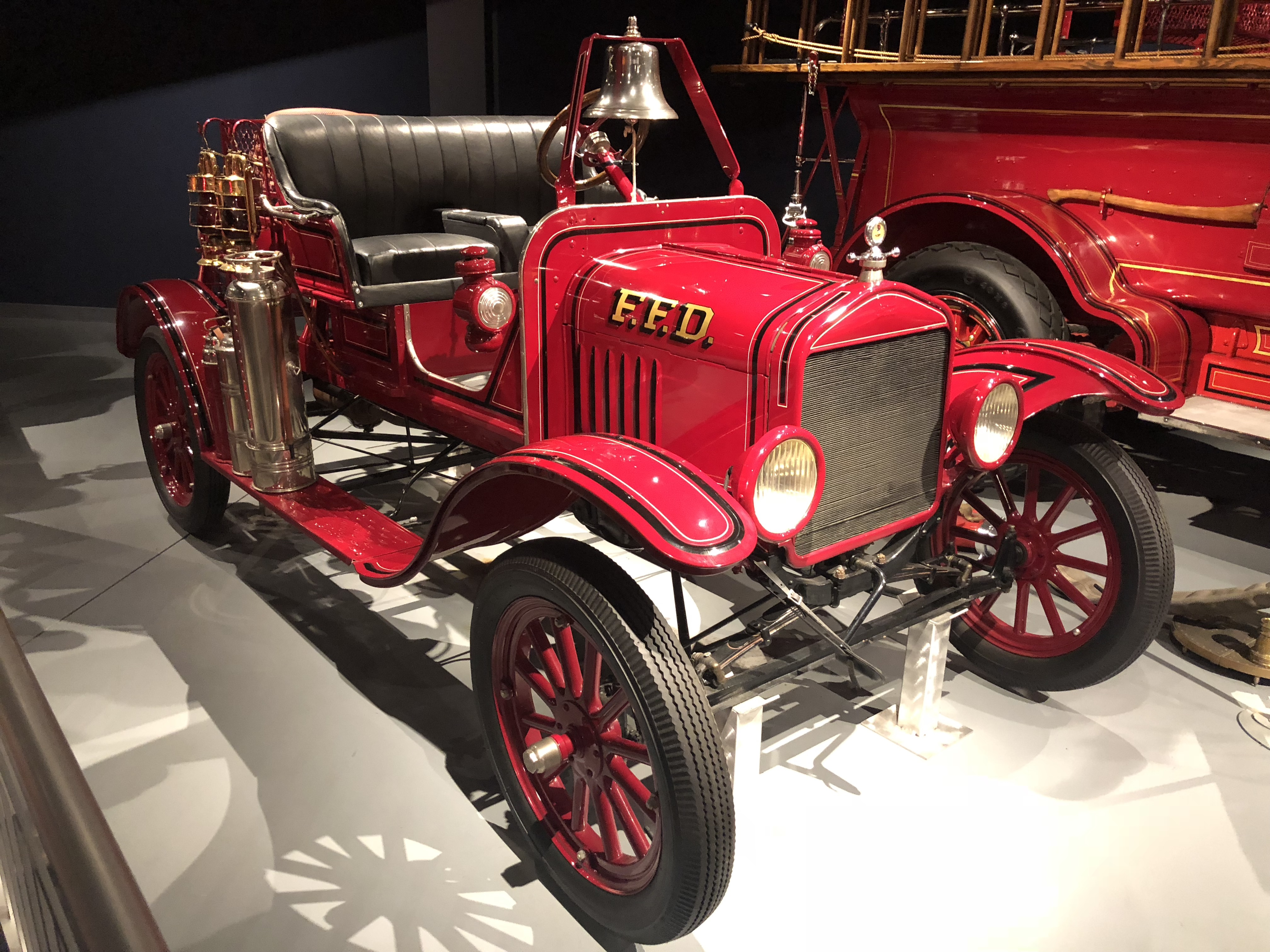
The American LaFrance company modified more than 900 Ford Model Ts to serve firefighters.

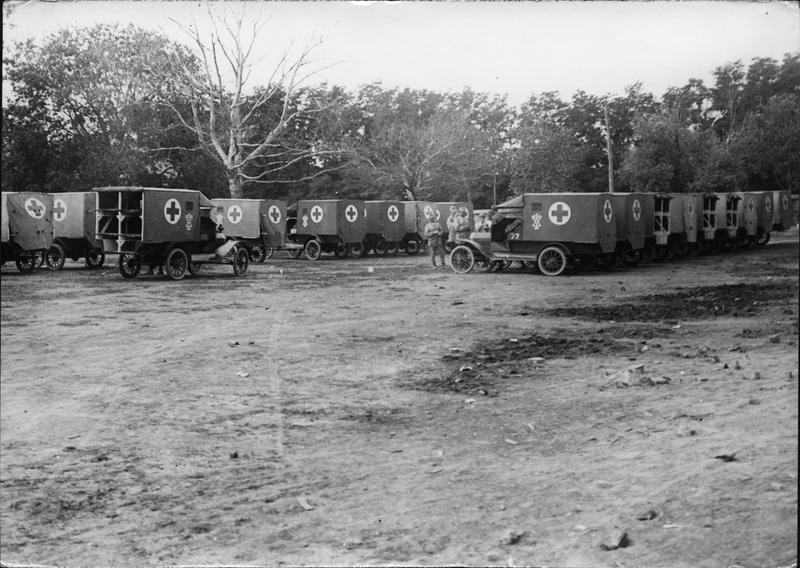
Romanian Model T "Regina Maria" ambulances, 1917

When the Model T was designed and introduced, the infrastructure of the world was quite different from today's. Pavement was a rarity except for sidewalks and a few big-city streets. (The meaning of the term "pavement" as opposed to "sidewalk" comes from that era, when streets and roads were generally dirt and sidewalks were a paved way to walk along them.) Agriculture was the occupation of many people. Power tools were scarce outside factories, as were power sources for them; electrification, like pavement, was found usually only in larger towns. Rural electrification and motorized mechanization were embryonic in some regions and nonexistent in most. Henry Ford oversaw the requirements and design of the Model T based on contemporary realities. Consequently, the Model T was (intentionally) almost as much a tractor and portable engine as it was an automobile. It has always been well regarded for its all-terrain abilities and ruggedness. It could travel a rocky, muddy farm lane, cross a shallow stream, climb a steep hill, and be parked on the other side to have one of its wheels removed and a pulley fastened to the hub for a flat belt to drive a bucksaw, thresher, silo blower, conveyor for filling corn cribs or haylofts, baler, water pump, electrical generator, and many other applications. One unique application of the Model T was shown in the October 1922 issue of Fordson Farmer magazine. It showed a minister who had transformed his Model T into a mobile church, complete with small organ.

During this era, entire automobiles (including thousands of Model Ts) were hacked apart by their owners and reconfigured into custom machinery permanently dedicated to a purpose, such as homemade tractors and ice saws. Dozens of aftermarket companies sold prefab kits to facilitate the T's conversion from car to tractor. The Model T had been around for a decade before the Fordson tractor became available (1917–18), and many Ts were converted for field use. (For example, Harry Ferguson, later famous for his hitches and tractors, worked on Eros Model T tractor conversions before he worked with Fordsons and others.) During the next decade, Model T tractor conversion kits were harder to sell, as the Fordson and then the Farmall (1924), as well as other light and affordable tractors, served the farm market. But during the Depression (1930s), Model T tractor conversion kits had a resurgence, because by then used Model Ts and junkyard parts for them were plentiful and cheap.

Like many popular car engines of the era, the Model T engine was also used on home-built aircraft (such as the Pietenpol Sky Scout) and motorboats.

During World War I, the Model T was heavily used by the Allies in different roles and configurations, such as staff cars, light cargo trucks, light vans, light patrol cars, liaison vehicles and even as rail tractors. The ambulance version proved to be well-suited for use in the combat areas. The ambulances could carry three stretcher patients or four seated patients, and two others could sit with the driver. Besides those made in the United States, ambulance bodies were also made by Carrosserie Kellner of Boulogne, near Paris. The Romanian Army also made use of converted Model T ambulances. These ambulances, named "Regina Maria" ambulances, were capable of carrying four stretcher patients. Conversion work was done by the Leonida Workshops of Bucharest. An armored-car variant (called the "FT-B") was developed in Poland in 1920 due to the high demand during the Polish-Soviet war in 1920.

Many Model Ts were converted into vehicles that could travel across heavy snows with kits on the rear wheels (sometimes with an extra pair of rear-mounted wheels and two sets of continuous track to mount on the now-tandemed rear wheels, essentially making it a half-track) and skis replacing the front wheels. They were popular for rural mail delivery for a time. The common name for these conversions of cars and small trucks was "snowflyers". These vehicles were extremely popular in the northern reaches of Canada, where factories were set up to produce them.

A number of companies built Model T–based railcars. In The Great Railway Bazaar, Paul Theroux mentions a rail journey in India on such a railcar. The New Zealand Railways Department's RM class included a few.

The American LaFrance company modified more than 900 Model Ts for use in firefighting, adding tanks, hoses, tools and a bell. Model T fire engines were in service in North America, Europe, and Australia. A 1919 Model T equipped to fight chemical fires has been restored and is on display at the North Charleston Fire Museum in South Carolina.

== Production ==
=== Mass production ===
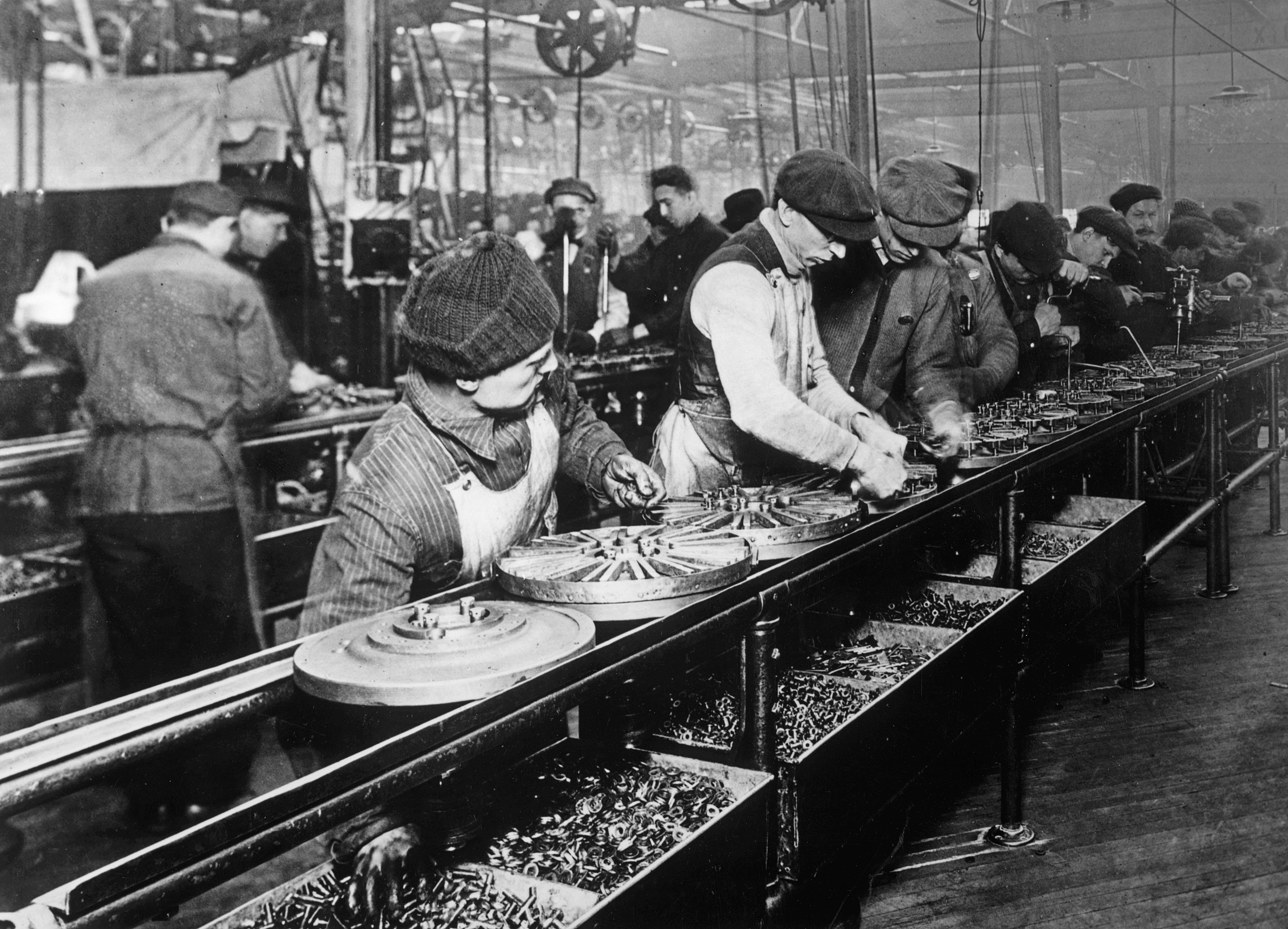
Ford assembly line, 1913

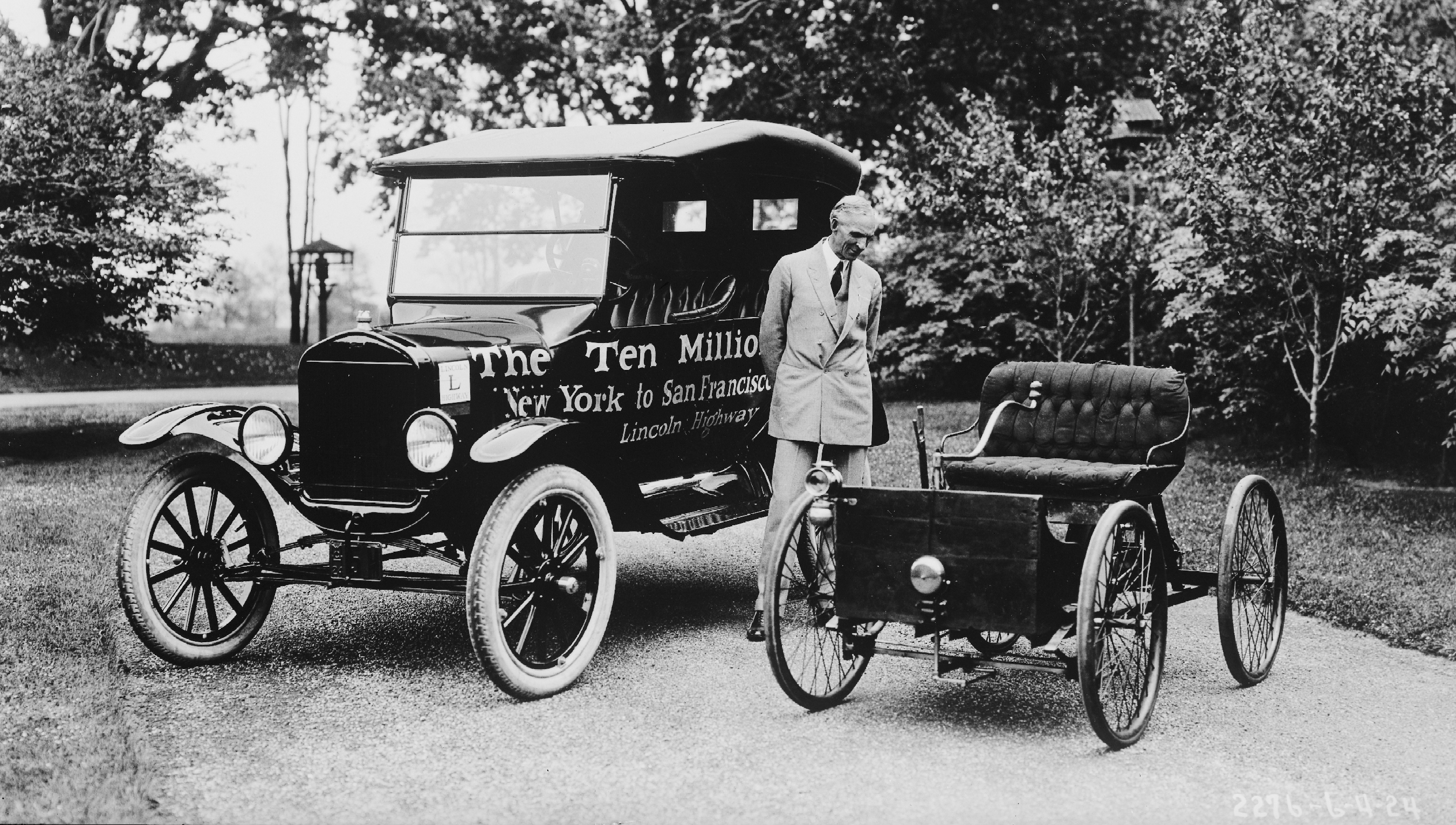
Henry Ford standing between the ten millionth Model T produced and a Ford Quadricycle, 1924

The knowledge and skills needed by a factory worker were reduced to 84 areas. When introduced, the T used the building methods typical at the time, assembly by hand, and production was small. The Ford Piquette Avenue Plant could not keep up with demand for the Model T, and only 11 cars were built there during the first full month of production. More and more machines were used to reduce the complexity within the 84 defined areas. In 1910, after assembling nearly 12,000 Model Ts, Henry Ford moved the company to the new Highland Park complex. During this time the Model T production system (including the supply chain) transitioned into an iconic example of assembly-line production. In subsequent decades it would also come to be viewed as the classic example of the rigid, first-generation version of assembly line production, as opposed to flexible mass production of higher quality products.

As a result, Ford's cars came off the line in three-minute intervals, much faster than previous methods, reducing production time from 12 1/2 hours before to 93 minutes by 1914, while using less manpower. In 1914, Ford produced more cars than all other automakers combined. The Model T was a great commercial success, and by the time Ford made its 10 millionth car, half of all cars in the world were Fords. It was so successful Ford did not purchase any advertising between 1917 and 1923; instead, the Model T became so famous, people considered it a norm. More than 15 million Model Ts were manufactured in all, reaching a rate of 9,000 to 10,000 cars a day in 1925, or 2 million annually, more than any other model of its day, at a price of just $260 ($4,773 today). Total Model T production was finally surpassed by the Volkswagen Beetle on February 17, 1972, while the Ford F-Series (itself directly descended from the Model T roadster pickup) has surpassed the Model T as Ford's all-time best-selling model.

- Ford statistics, 1910–1931

Henry Ford's ideological approach to Model T design was one of getting it right and then keeping it the same; he believed the Model T was all the car a person would, or could, ever need. As other companies offered comfort and styling advantages, at competitive prices, the Model T lost market share and became barely profitable. Design changes were not as few as the public perceived, but the idea of an unchanging model was kept intact. Eventually, on May 26, 1927, Ford Motor Company ceased US production and began the changeovers required to produce the Model A. Some of the other Model T factories in the world continued for a short while, with the final Model T produced at the Cork, Ireland plant in December 1927.

Model T engines continued to be produced until August 4, 1941. Almost 170,000 were built after car production stopped, as replacement engines were required to service the many existing vehicles. Racers and enthusiasts, forerunners of modern hot rodders, used the Model Ts' blocks to build popular and cheap racing engines, including Cragar, Navarro, and, famously, the Frontenacs ("Fronty Fords") of the Chevrolet brothers, among many others.

The Model T employed some advanced technology, for example, its use of vanadium steel alloy. Its durability was phenomenal, and some Model Ts and their parts are in running order over a century later. Although Henry Ford resisted some kinds of change, he always championed the advancement of materials engineering, and often mechanical engineering and industrial engineering.

On May 26, 1927, Henry Ford and his son Edsel drove the 15-millionth Model T out of the factory. This marked the famous automobile's official last day of production at the main factory.

Although Ford no longer manufactures parts for the Model T, many parts are still manufactured through private companies as replicas to service the thousands of Model Ts still in operation today.

In 2002, Ford built a batch of six Model Ts as part of their 2003 centenary celebrations. These cars were assembled from new reproduction parts from third party companies and from some parts reproduced from the original drawings. The last of the six was used for publicity purposes in the UK.

=== Price and production ===
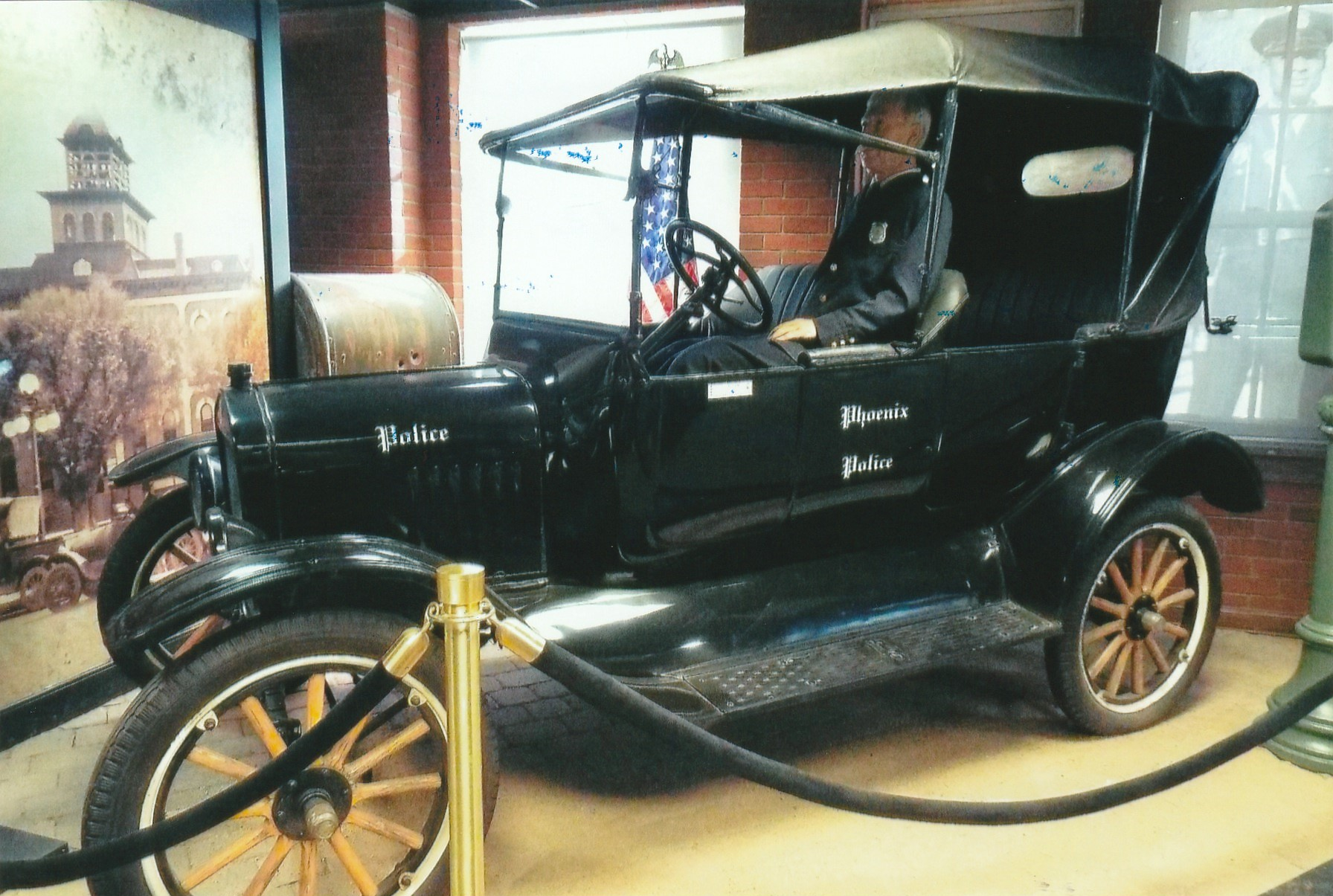
1919 Ford Model T Phoenix Police cruiser

External image
- Ford Model T price/volume curve, 1909–1923

The moving assembly line system, which started on October 7, 1913, allowed Ford to reduce the price of his cars. As he continued to fine-tune the system, Ford was able to keep reducing costs significantly. As volume increased, he was able to also lower the prices due to some of the fixed costs being spread over a larger number of vehicles, and as large supply chain investments increased assets per vehicle, other factors such as material costs and design changes reduced the price. As Ford had market dominance in North America during the 1910s, other competitors reduced their prices to stay competitive, while offering features that were not available on the Model T such as a wide choice of colors, body styles and interior appearance and choices, and competitors also benefited from the reduced costs of raw materials and infrastructure benefits to supply chain and ancillary manufacturing businesses.

In 1909, the cost of the Runabout started at $825 (equivalent to $29,560 in 2025). By 1925 it had been lowered to $260 (equivalent to $4,770 in 2025).

The figures below are US production numbers compiled by R. E. Houston, Ford Production Department, August 3, 1927. The figures between 1909 and 1920 are for Ford's fiscal year. From 1909 to 1913, the fiscal year was from October 1 to September 30 the following calendar year with the year number being the year in which it ended. For the 1914 fiscal year, the year was October 1, 1913, through July 31, 1914. Starting in August 1914, and through the end of the Model T era, the fiscal year was August 1 through July 31. Beginning with January 1920, the figures are for the calendar year.

| Year | Production | Price for Runabout | Current equivalent cost | Notes |
|---|---|---|---|---|
| 1909 | 10,666 | $825 | $29,562 | Touring car was $850. |
| 1910 | 19,050 | $900 | $31,098 | |
| 1911 | 34,858 | $680 | $23,496 | |
| 1912 | 68,733 | $590 | $19,684 | |
| 1913 | 170,211 | $525 | $17,102 | |
| 1914 | 202,667 | $440 | $14,143 | Fiscal year was only 10 months long due to change in end date from September 30 to July 31. |
| 1915 | 308,162 | $390 | $12,412 | |
| 1916 | 501,462 | $345 | $10,208 | |
| 1917 | 735,020 | $500 | $12,565 | |
| 1918 | 664,076 | $500 | $10,702 | |
| 1919 | 498,342 | $500 | $9,285 | |
| 1920 | 941,042 | $395 | $6,348 | Production for fiscal year 1920, (August 1, 1919, through July 31, 1920). Price was $550 in March but dropped by September. |
| 1920 | 463,451 | $395 | $6,348 | Production for balance of calendar year, August 1 through December 31. Total '1920' production (17 months) = 1,404,493 |
| 1921 | 971,610 | $325 | $5,866 | Price was $370 in June but dropped by September. |
| 1922 | 1,301,067 | $319 | $6,136 | |
| 1923 | 2,011,125 | $364 | $6,878 | |
| 1924 | 1,922,048 | $265 | $4,978 | |
| 1925 | 1,911,705 | $260 | $4,773 | Touring car was $290. |
| 1926 | 1,554,465 | $360 | $6,547 | |
| 1927 | 399,725 | $360 | $6,672 | Production ended before mid-year to allow retooling for the Model A. |

The above tally includes a total of 14,689,525 vehicles. Ford said the last Model T was the 15 millionth vehicle produced.

=== Recycling ===
Henry Ford used wood scraps from the production of Model Ts to make charcoal briquettes. Originally named Ford Charcoal, the name was changed to Kingsford Charcoal after the Iron Mountain Ford Plant closed in 1951 and the Kingsford Chemical Company was formed and continued the wood distillation process. Edward G. Kingsford, Ford's cousin-in-law, brokered the selection of the new sawmill and wood distillation plant site. Lumber for production of the Model T came from the same location, built in 1920 called the Iron Mountain Ford which incorporated a sawmill where lumber from Ford purchased land in the Upper Peninsula of Michigan was cut and dried. Scrap wood was distilled at the Iron Mountain plant for its wood chemicals, including methanol (wood alcohol), with the end by-product being lump charcoal. This lump charcoal was modified and pressed into briquettes and mass-marketed by Ford.

=== First global car ===
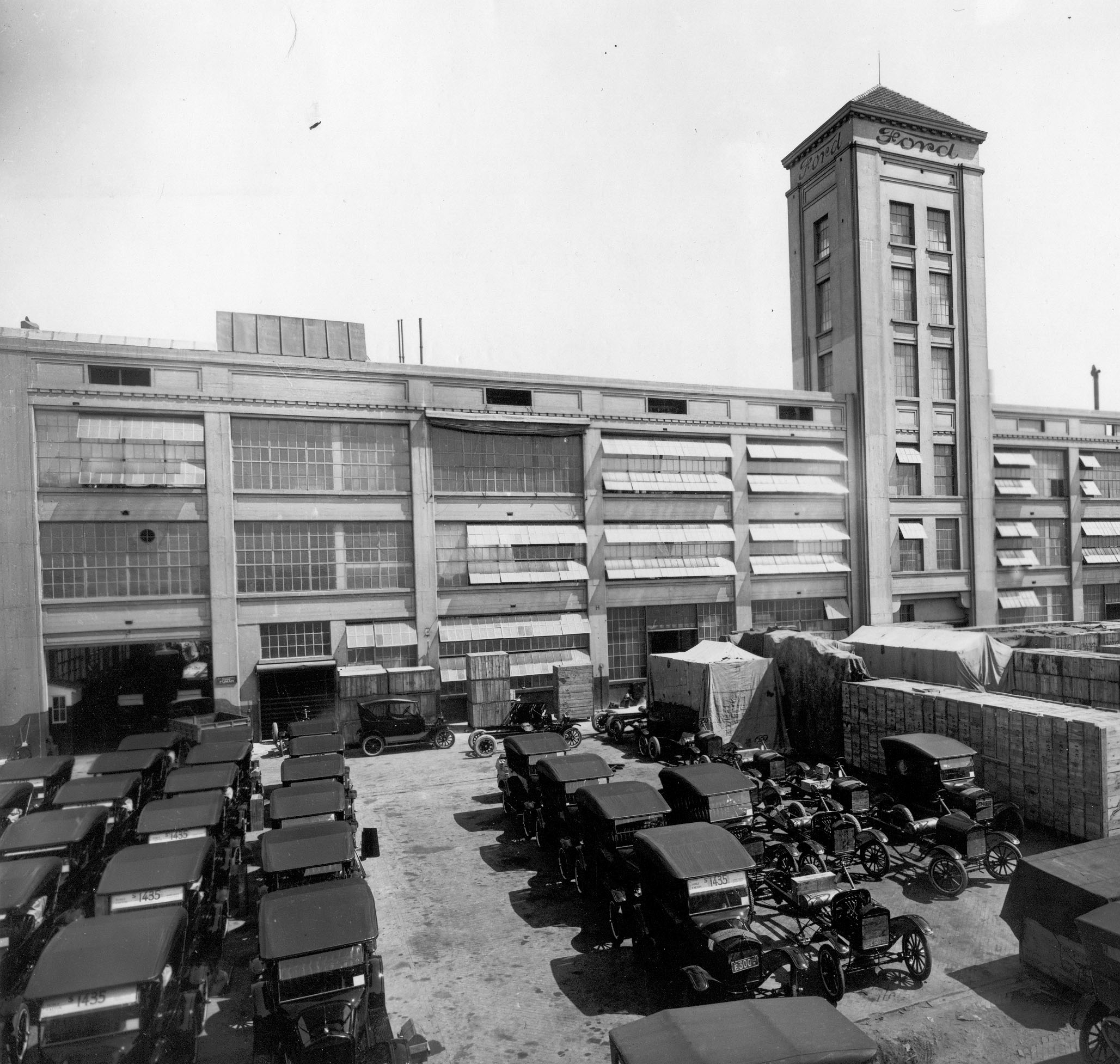
The first Ford assembly plant in La Boca, Buenos Aires, c. 1921

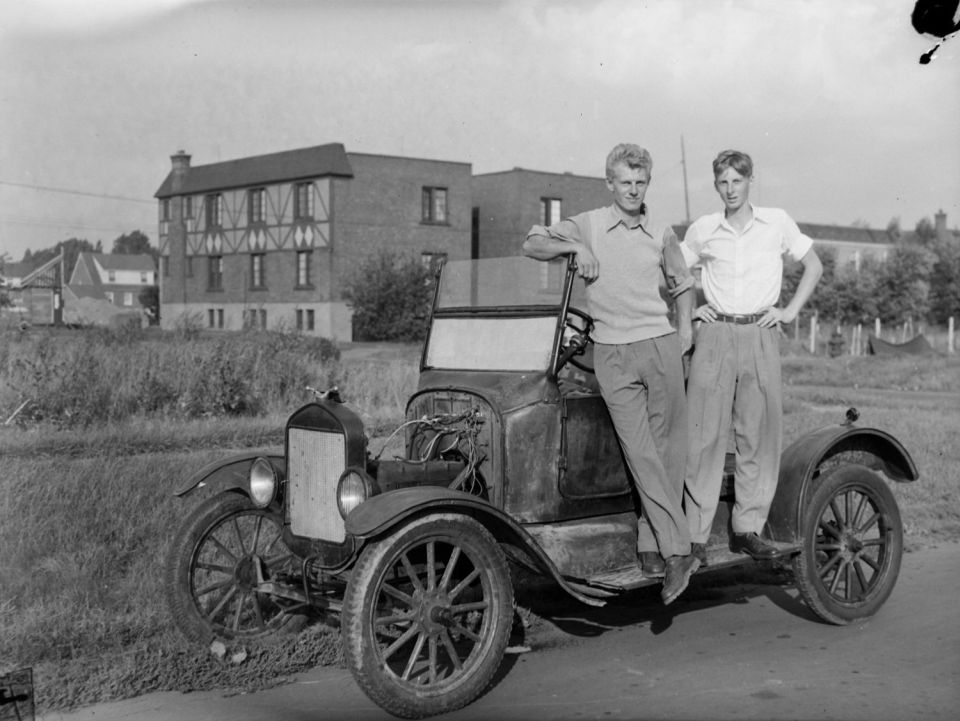
A 1923 Ford T in Canada, photographed in 1948

The Ford Model T was the first automobile built by multiple countries simultaneously, since they were being produced in Walkerville, Canada, and in Trafford Park, Greater Manchester, England, starting in 1911. After World War I ended in 1918, they were assembled in Germany, Argentina, France, Spain, Denmark, Norway, Belgium, Brazil, Mexico, Australia and Japan. Furthermore, exports from the American factories reached 303,000 in 1925. The heavy losses of horses during the World War made the Model T attractive as a new power source for European farmers. They used the Model T to pull plows, tow wagons, and power farm machinery. It enabled them to transport their products to markets more efficiently.

The Aeroford was an English automobile manufactured in Bayswater, London, from 1920 to 1925. It was a Model T with a distinct hood and grille to make it appear to be a totally different design, what later was called badge engineering. The Aeroford sold from £288 in 1920, dropping to £168–214 by 1925. It was available as a two-seater, four-seater, or coupé.

== Advertising and marketing ==
Ford created a massive publicity machine in Detroit to ensure every newspaper carried stories and advertisements about the new product. Promotion began well in advance for the introduction of the Model T, with advertisements appearing in newspapers in January 1908. Ford's network of local dealers made the car ubiquitous in virtually every city in North America. A large part of the success of Ford's Model T stems from the innovative strategy which introduced a large network of sales hubs making it easy to purchase the car. As independent dealers, the franchisees grew rich and publicized not just the Ford but the very concept of automobiling; local motor clubs sprang up to help new drivers and to explore the countryside. Ford was always eager to sell to farmers, who looked on the vehicle as a commercial device to help their business. Sales skyrocketed – several years posted around 100 percent gains on the previous year.

== "Jitney" taxi ==
In the US and Canada in the early years of the 20th century, regulated or unregulated share taxi or illegal taxi operations were known as Jitney services. Due to the large number of Model T's used for these services, the Model T was also often called a Jitney.

== 24 Hours of Le Mans ==
Parisian Ford dealer Charles Montier and his brother-in-law Albert Ouriou entered a heavily modified version of the Model T (the "Montier Special") in the first three 24 Hours of Le Mans. They finished 14th in the inaugural 1923 race.

== Car clubs ==
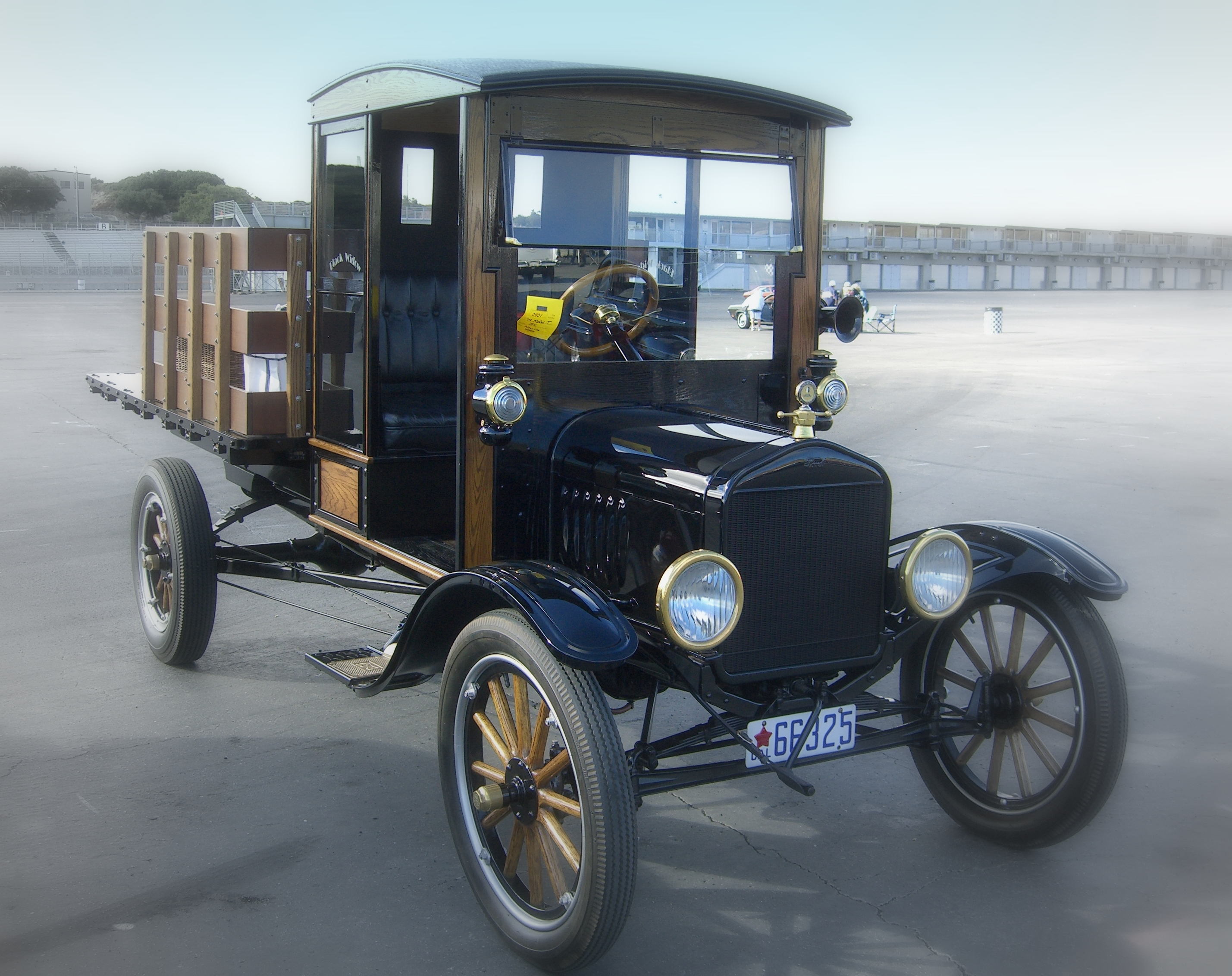
1919 Model T stakebed

Today, four main clubs exist to support the preservation and restoration of these cars: the Model T Ford Club International, the Model T Ford Club of America and the combined clubs of Australia. With many chapters of clubs around the world, the Model T Ford Club of Victoria has a membership with a considerable number of uniquely Australian cars. (Australia produced its own car bodies, and therefore many differences occurred between the Australian bodied tourers and the US/Canadian cars.) In the UK, the Model T Ford Register of Great Britain celebrated its 50th anniversary in 2010. Many steel Model T parts are still manufactured today, and even fiberglass replicas of their distinctive bodies are produced, which are popular for T-bucket style hot rods (as immortalized in the Jan and Dean surf music song "Bucket T", which was later recorded by The Who). In 1949, more than twenty years after the end of production, 200,000 Model Ts were registered in the United States. In 2008, it was estimated that about 50,000 to 60,000 Ford Model Ts remain roadworthy.

== Gallery ==
Model T chronology

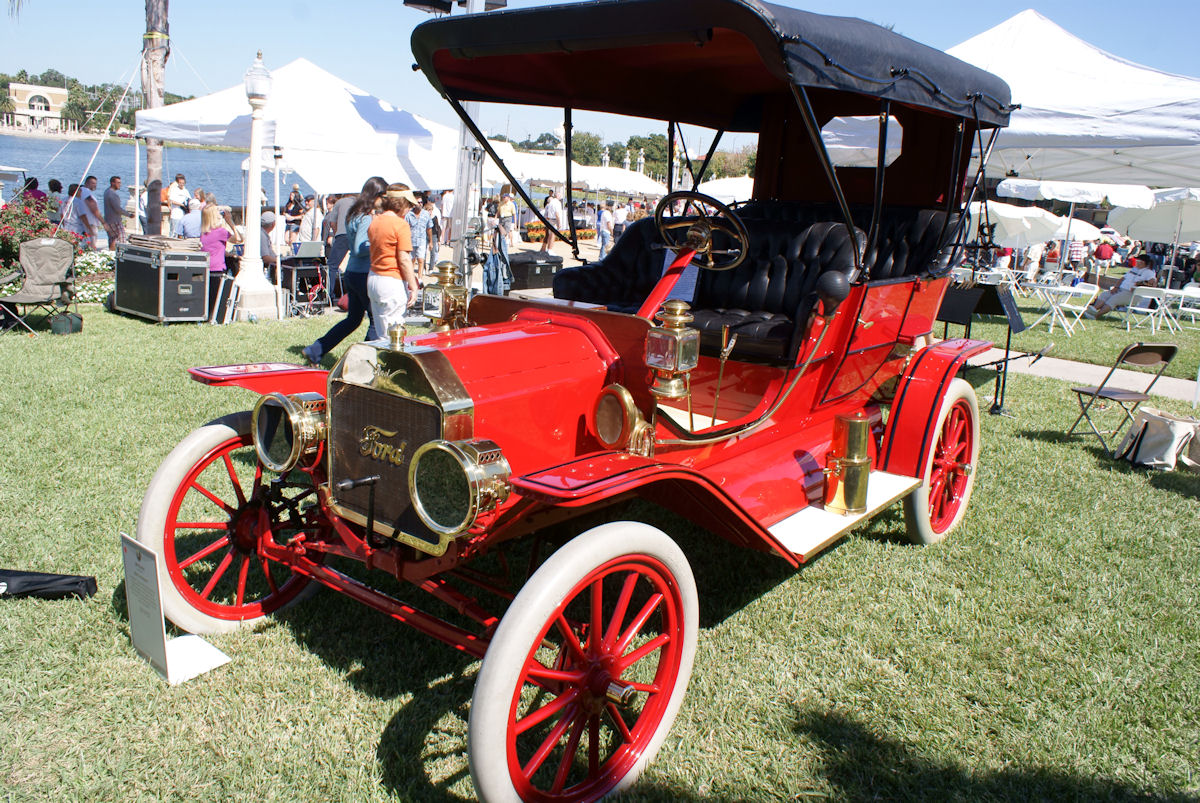
1909 touring (a very early example with two-pedal, two-lever control)

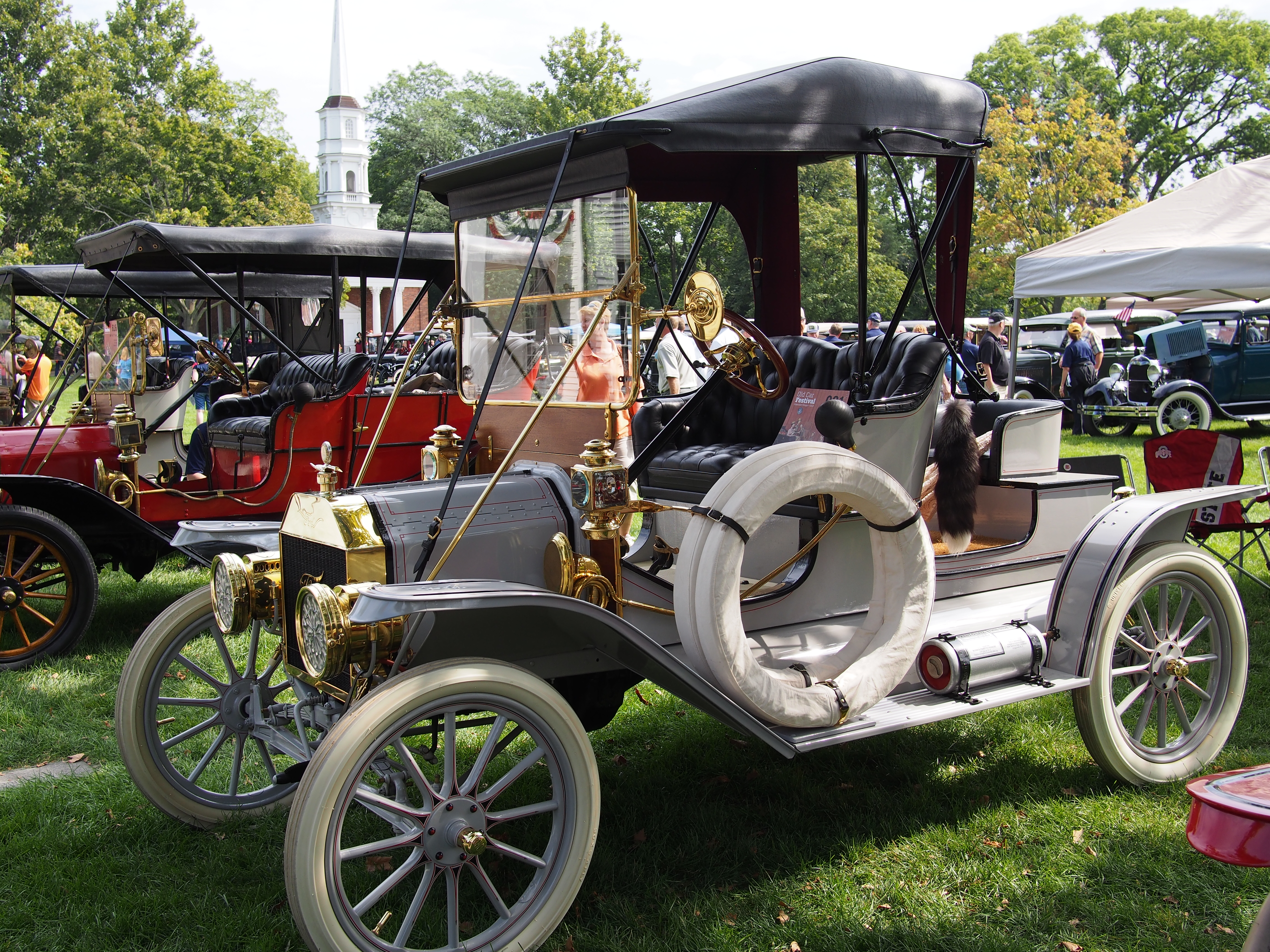
1909 roadster

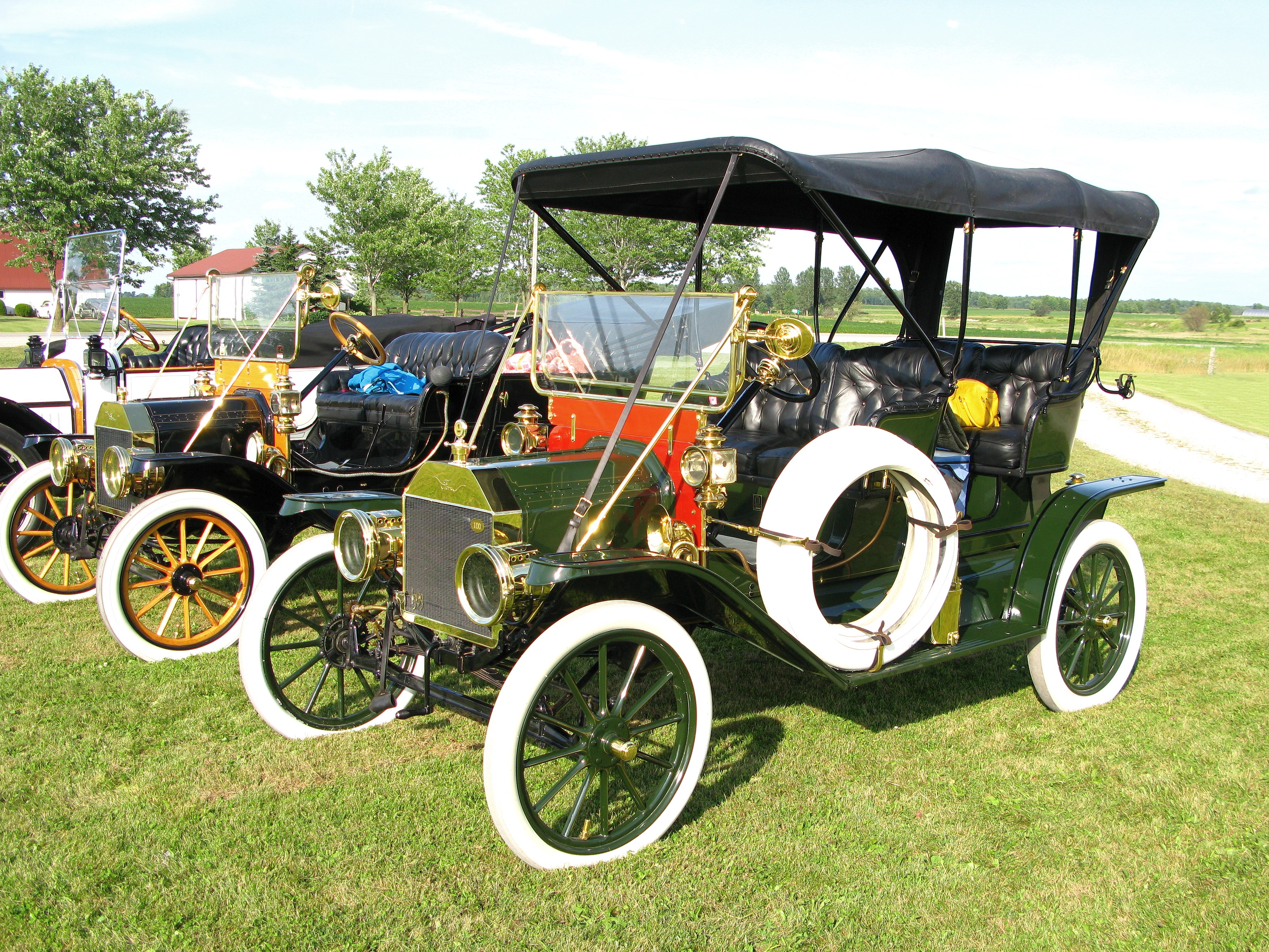
1909 Tourabout (like the touring, but without rear doors)

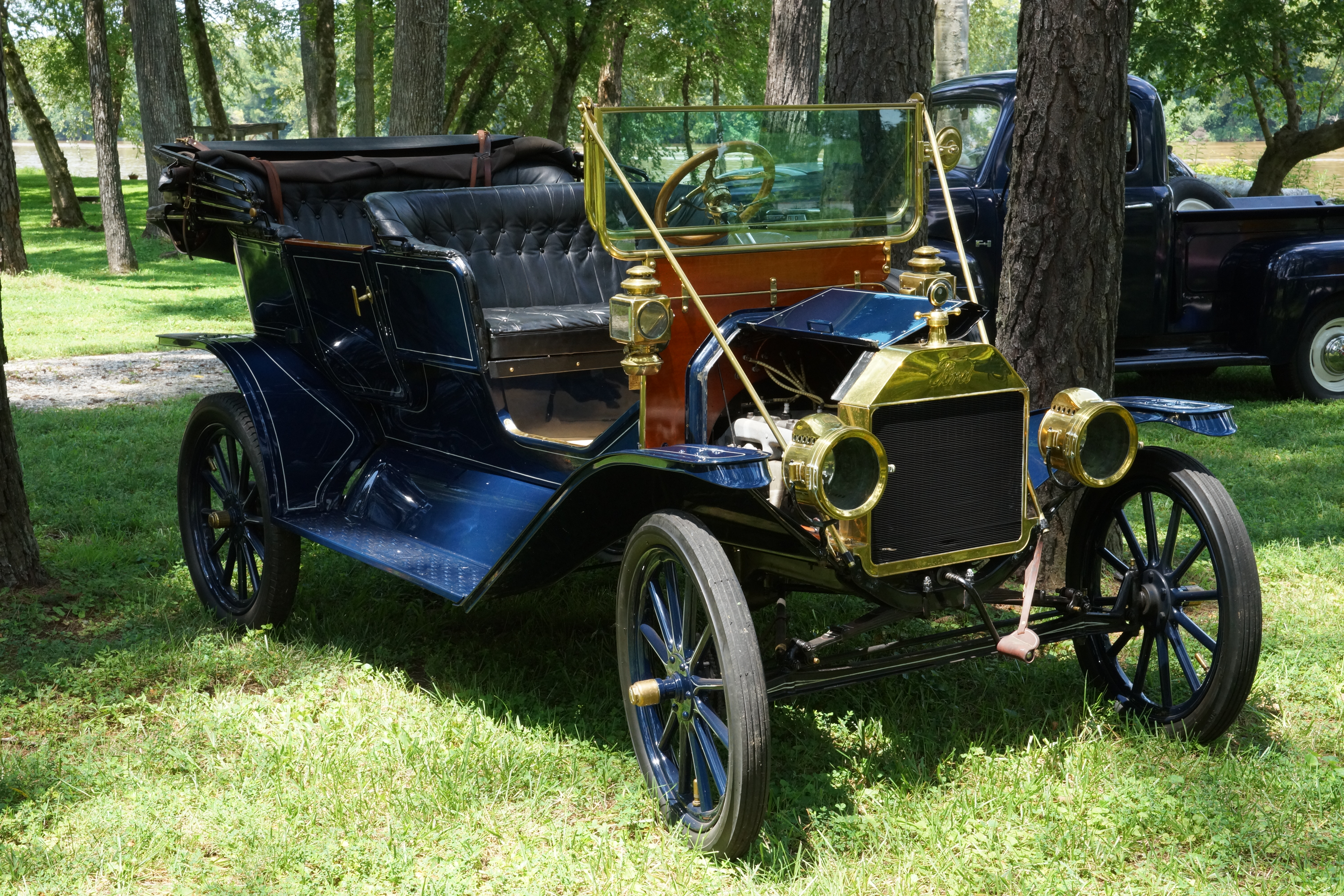
1911 touring

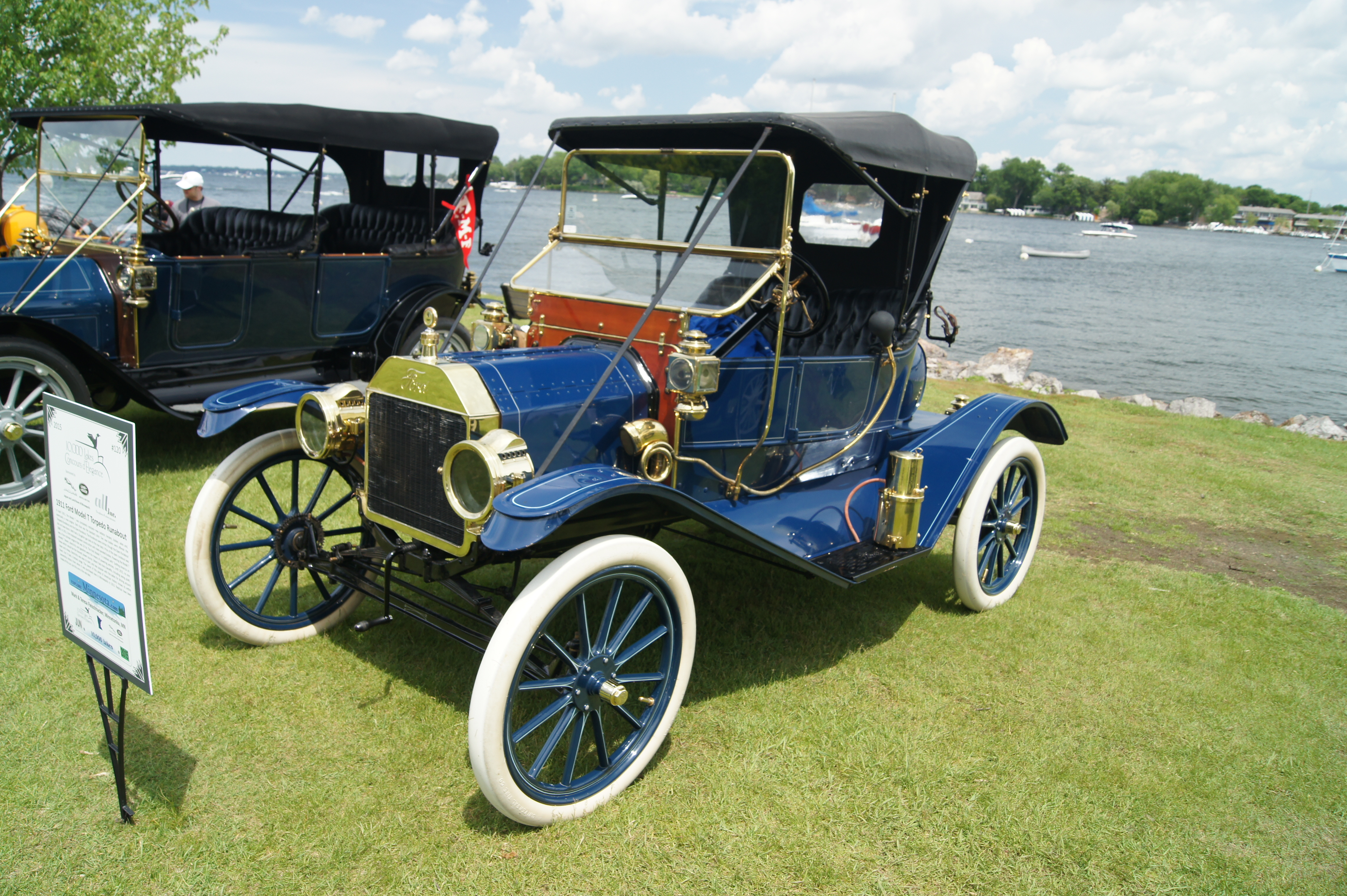
1911 Torpedo Runabout

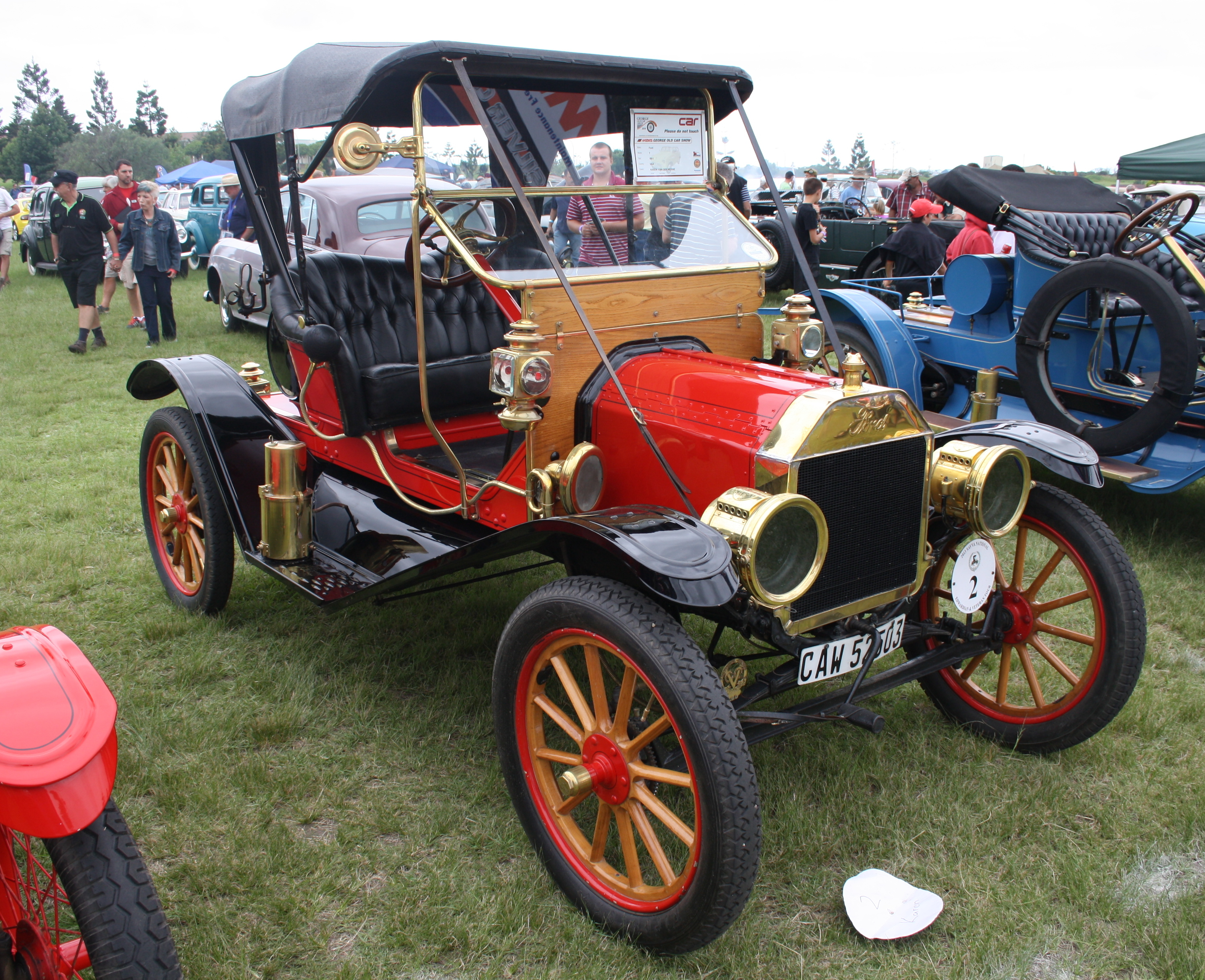
1911 Open Runabout

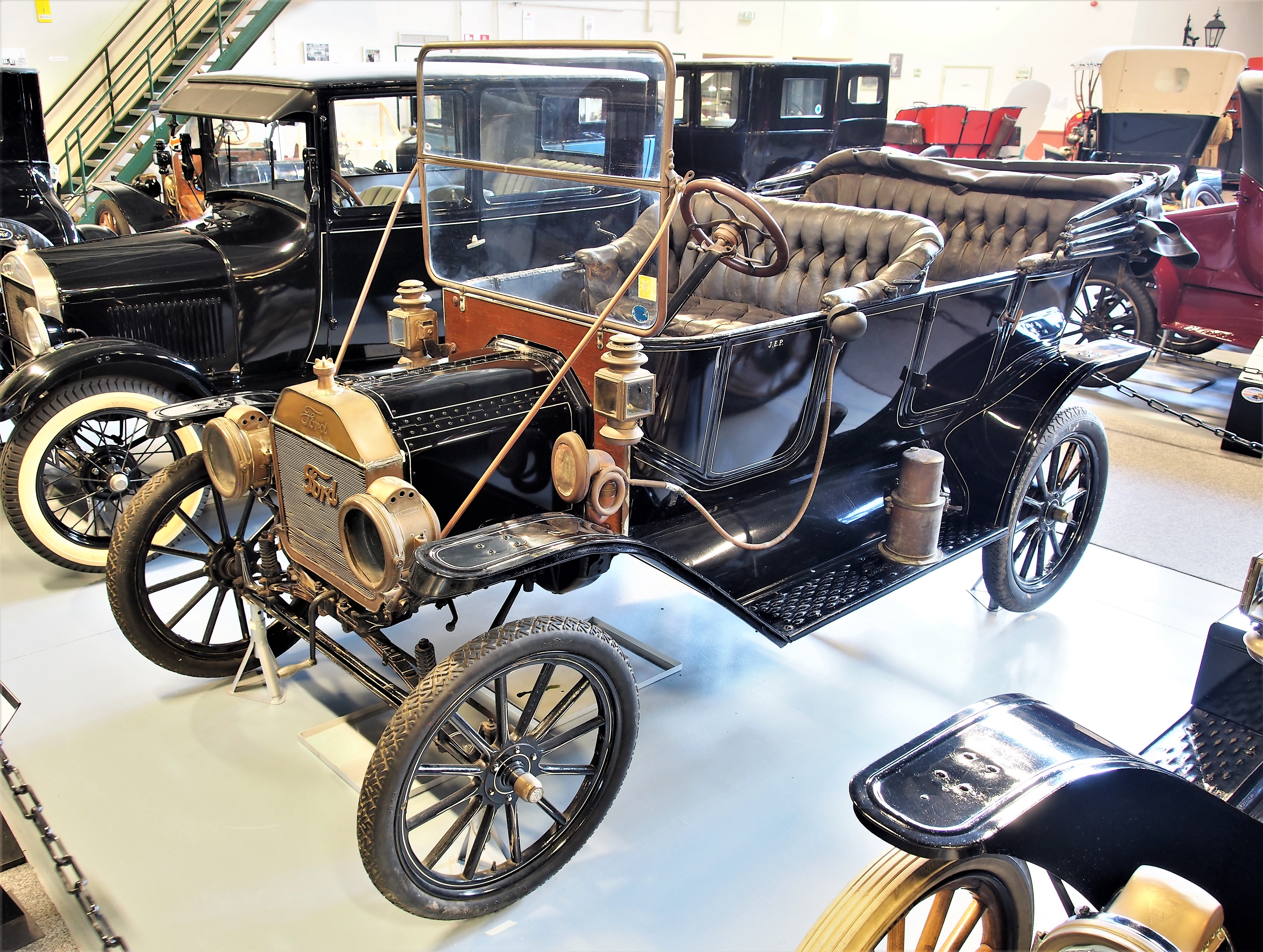
1912 touring

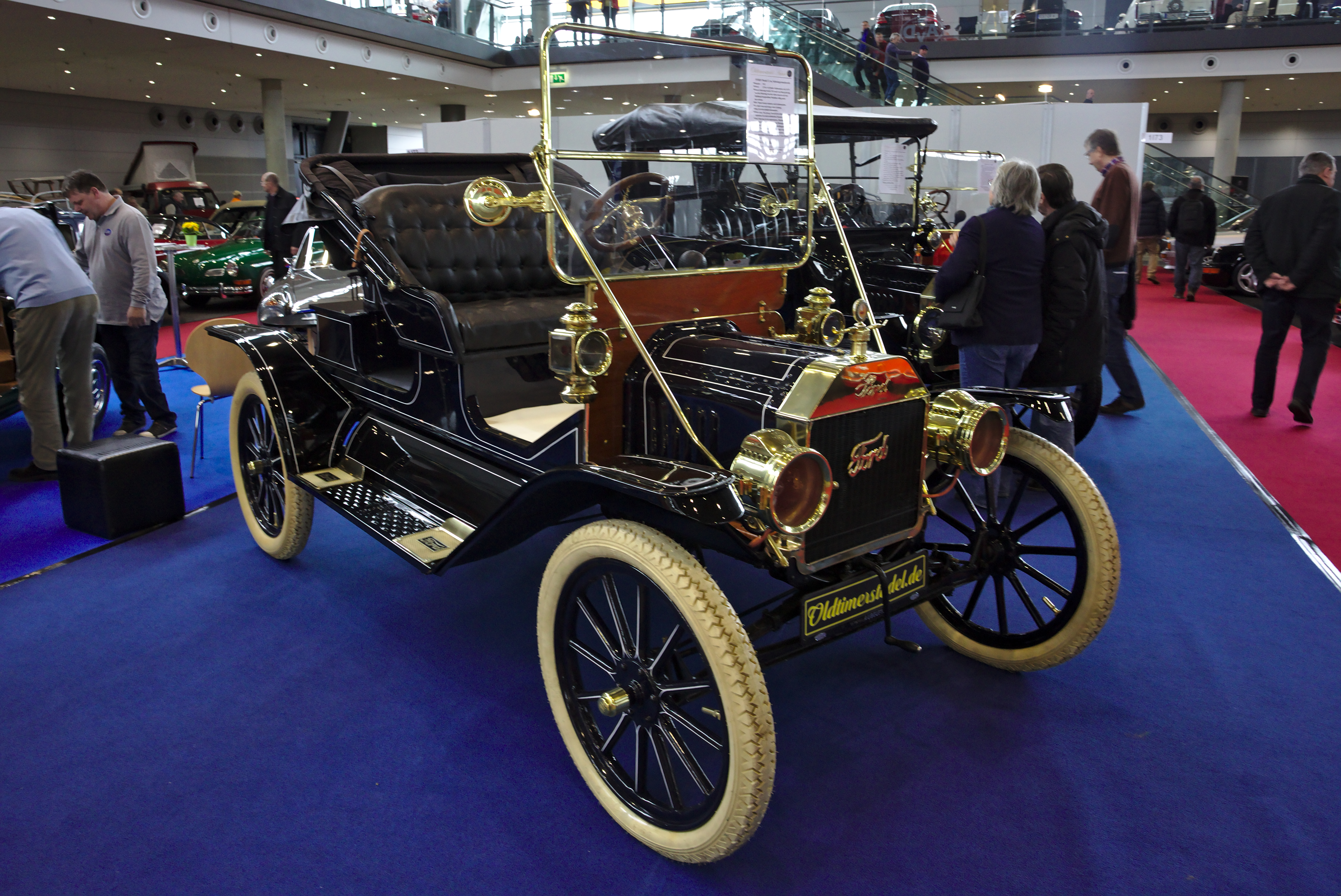
1912 commercial roadster

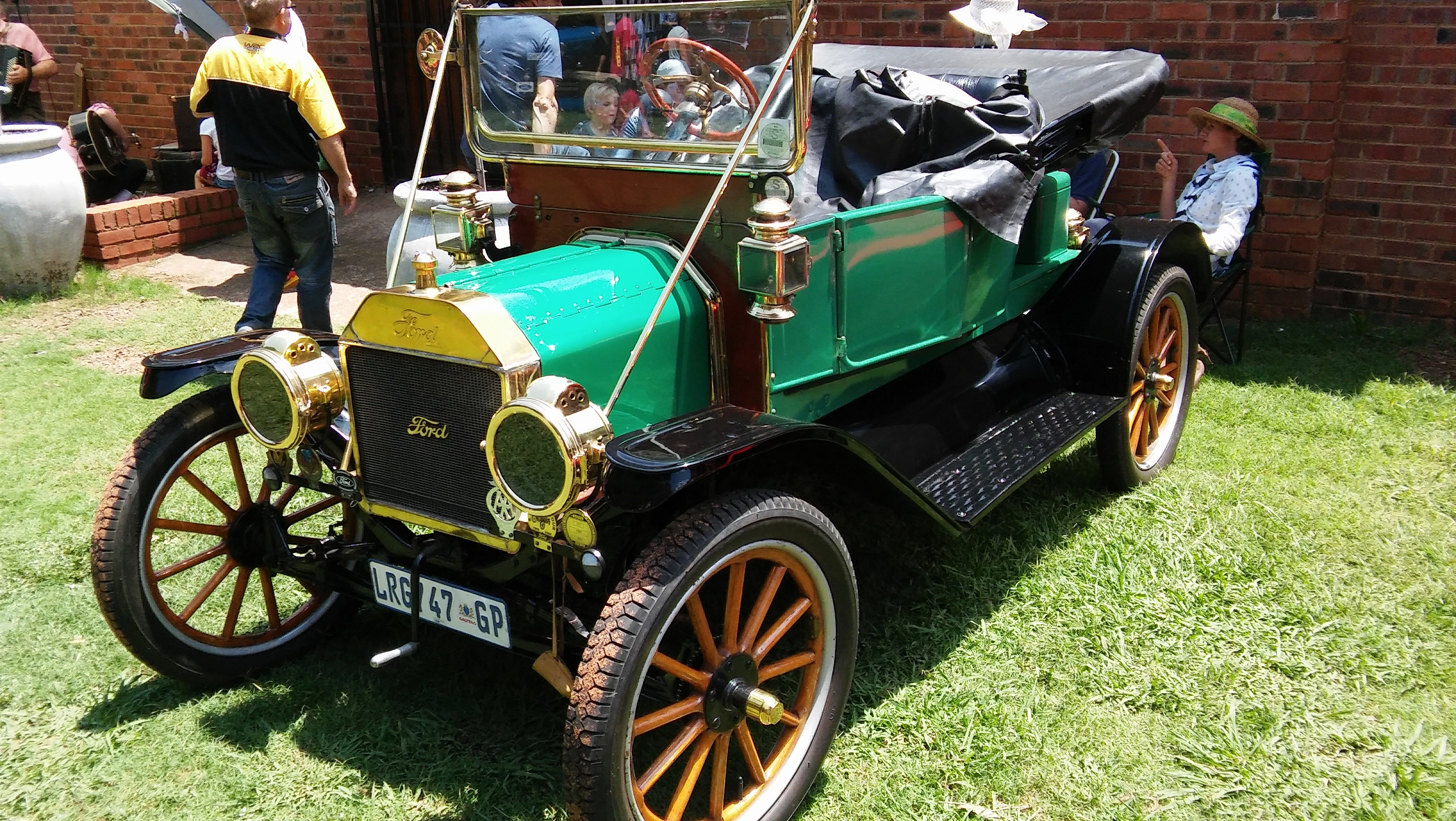
1912 Torpedo Runabout

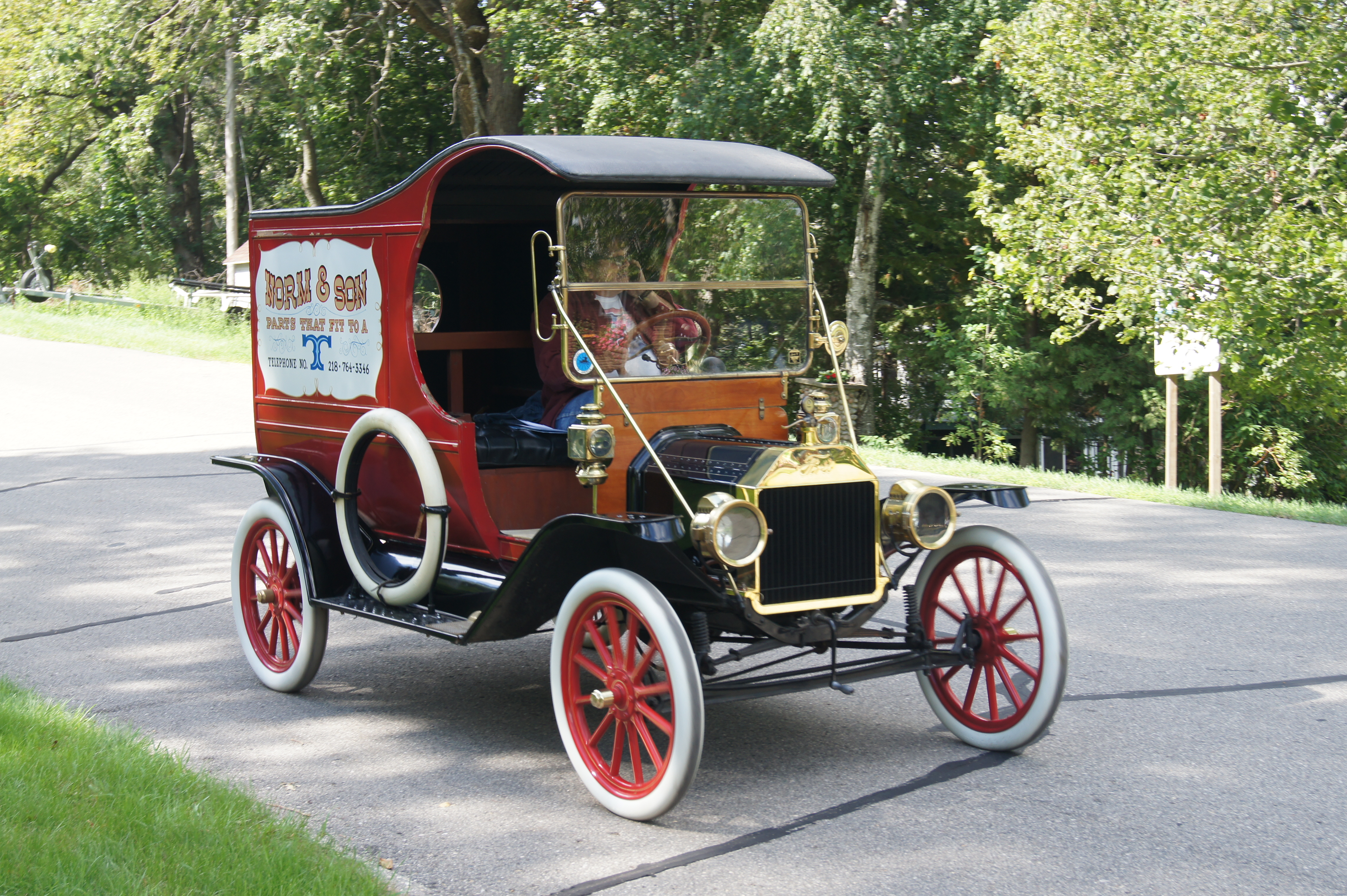
1912 delivery car

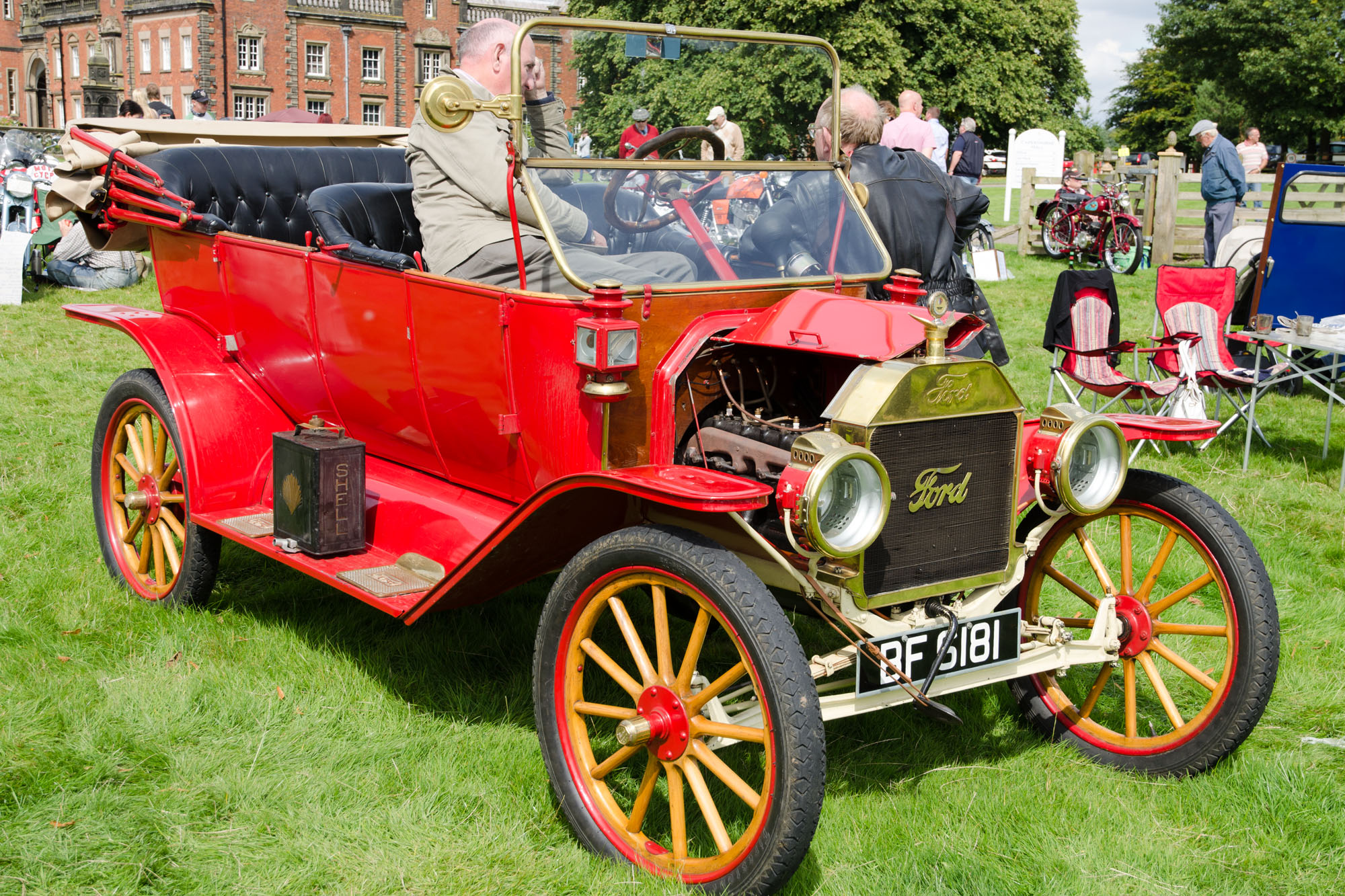
1913 Touring

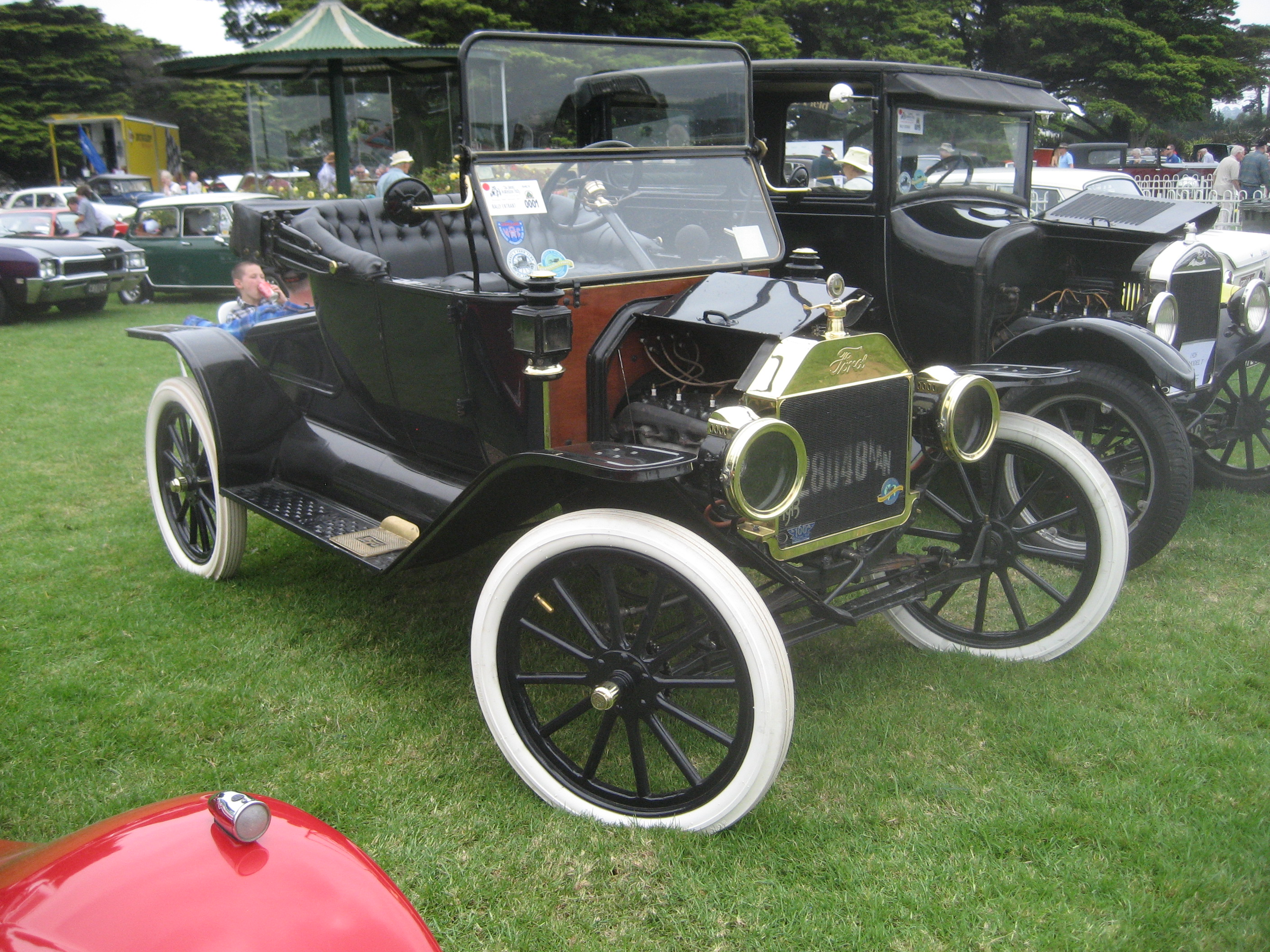
1913 Runabout

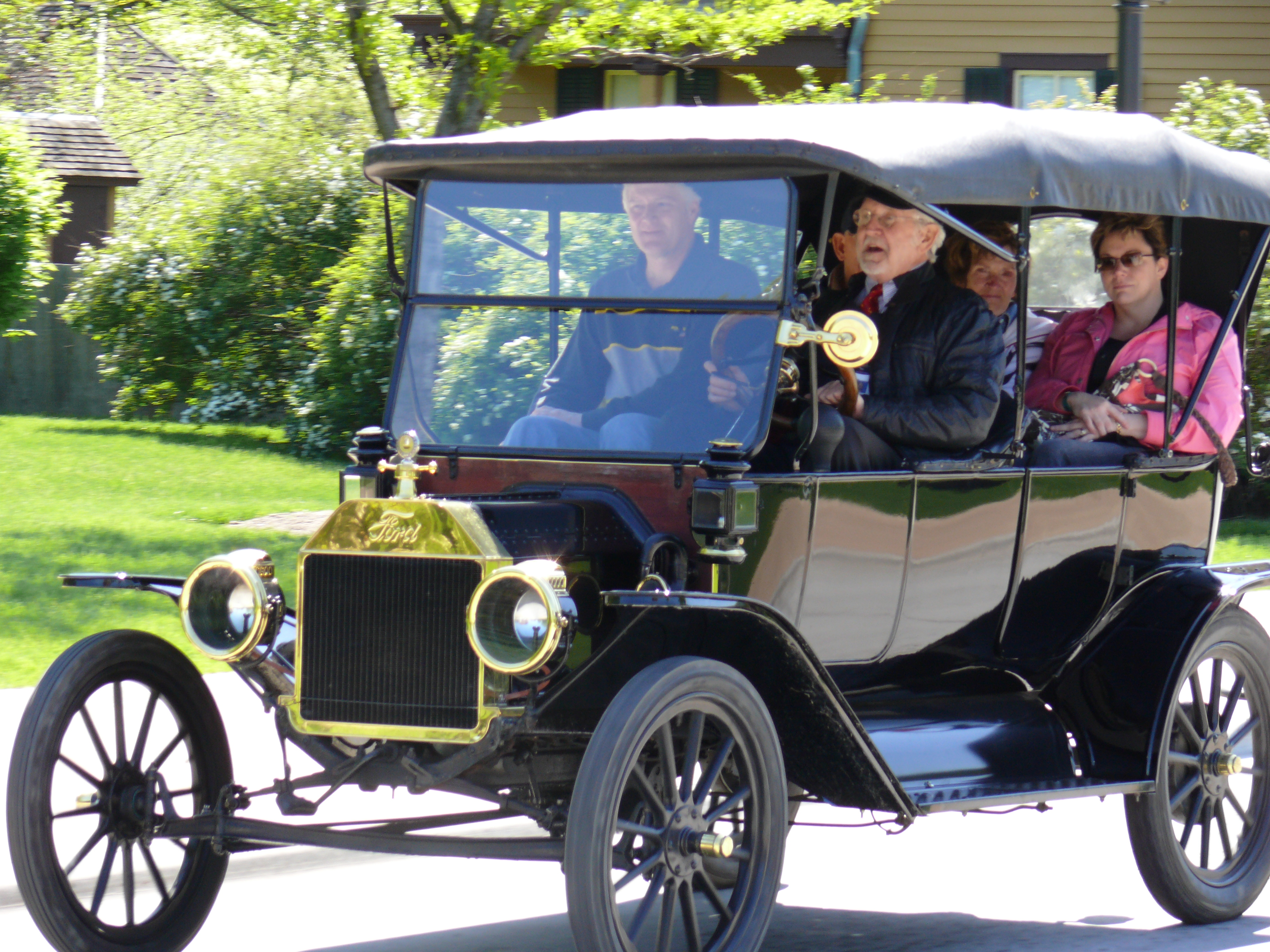
1914 touring

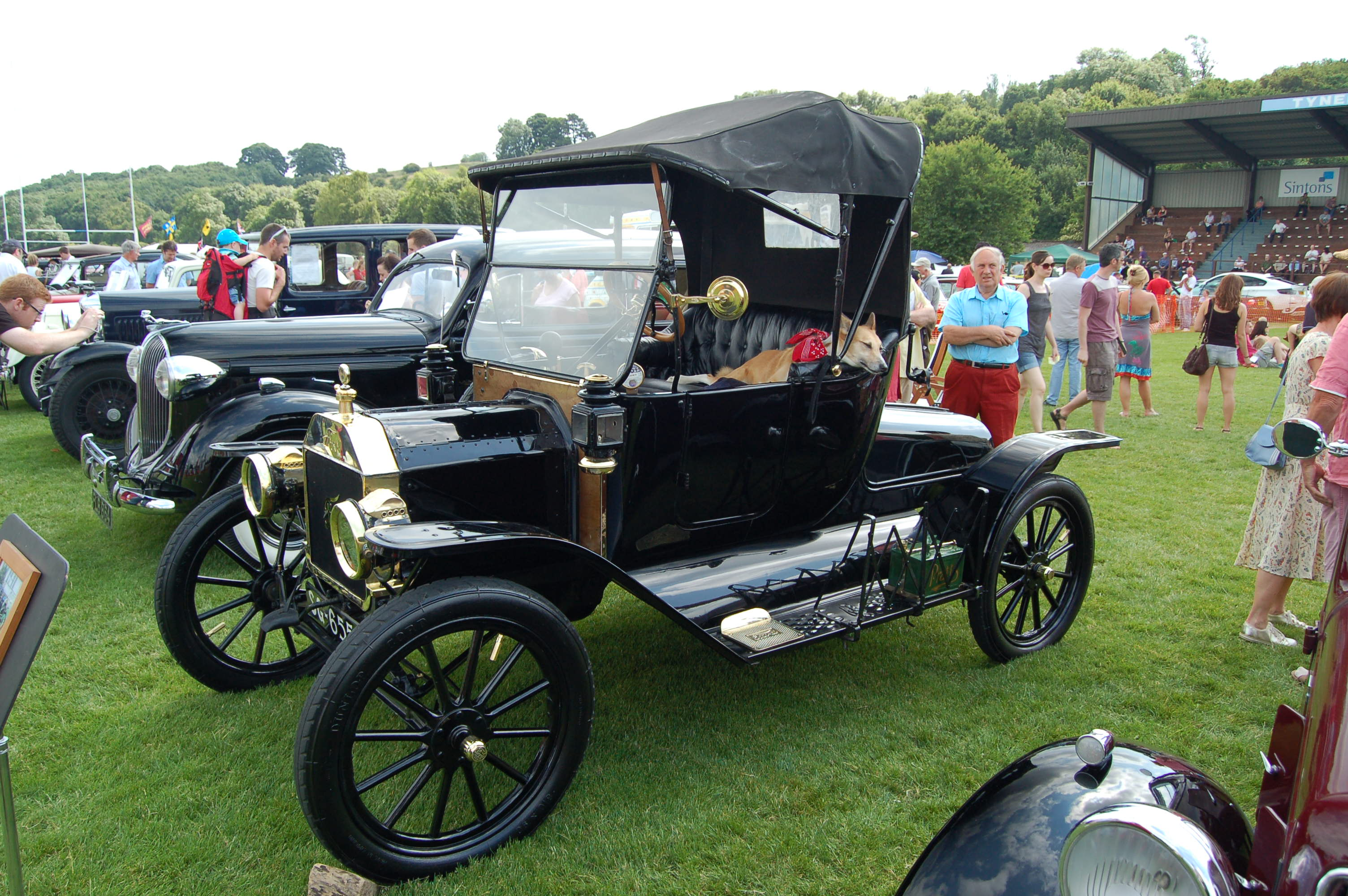
1914 Runabout

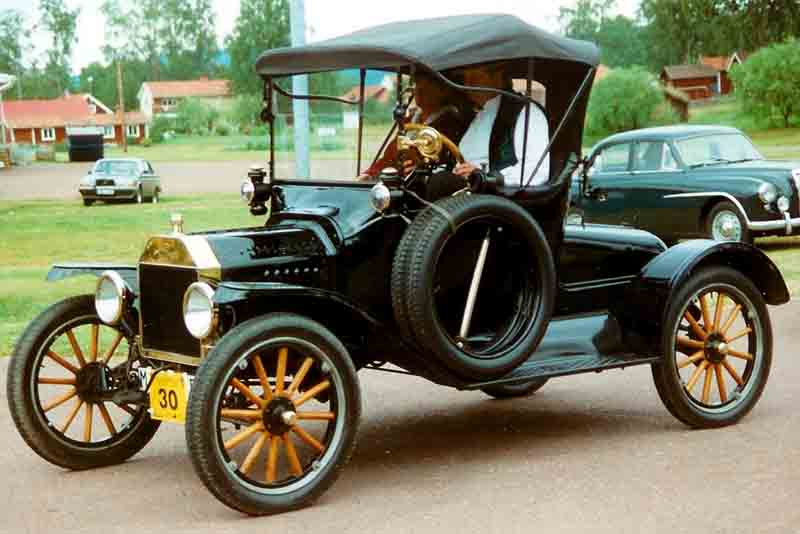
1915 Runabout – curved cowl panel added

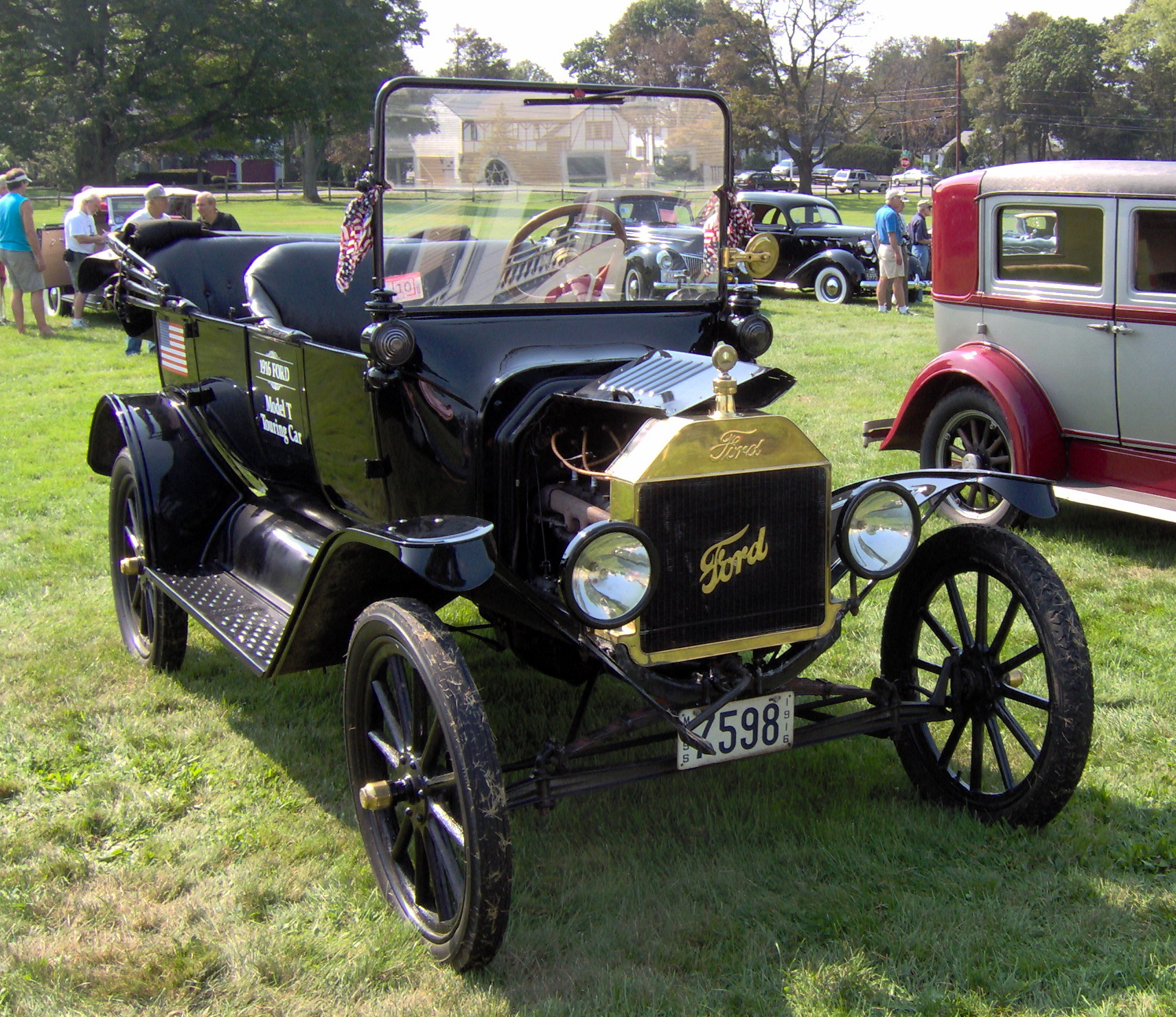
1916 touring

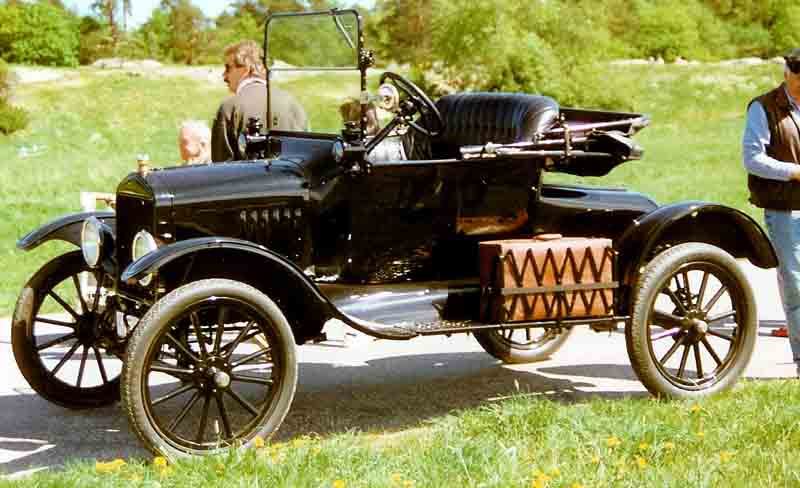
1917 Runabout – begin curved hood to match cowl panel

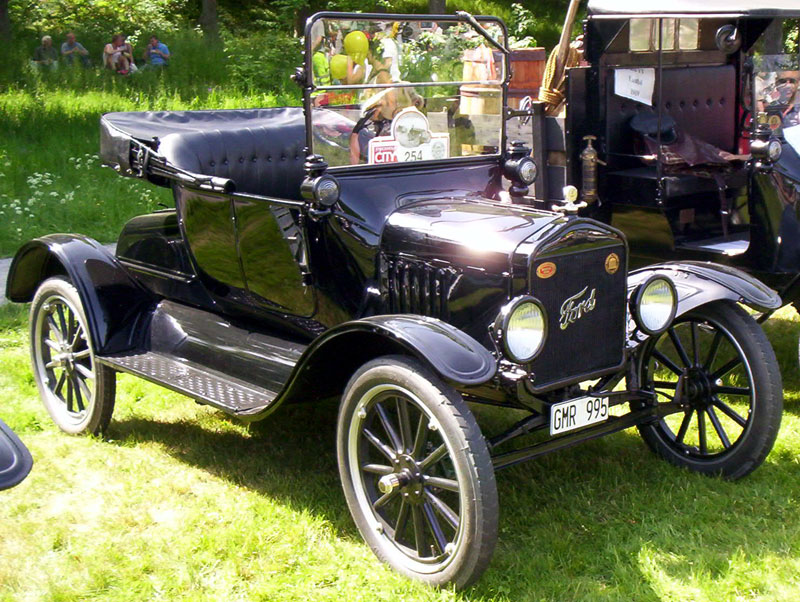
1919 Runabout

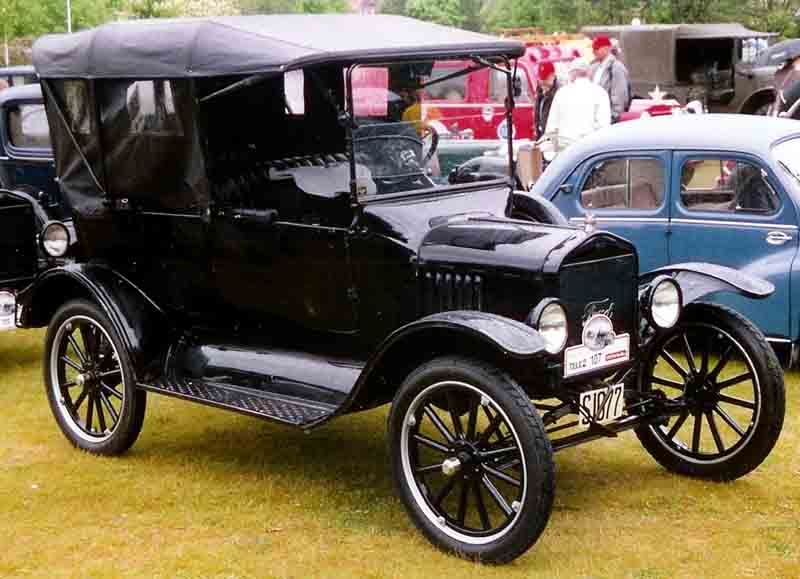
1920 touring

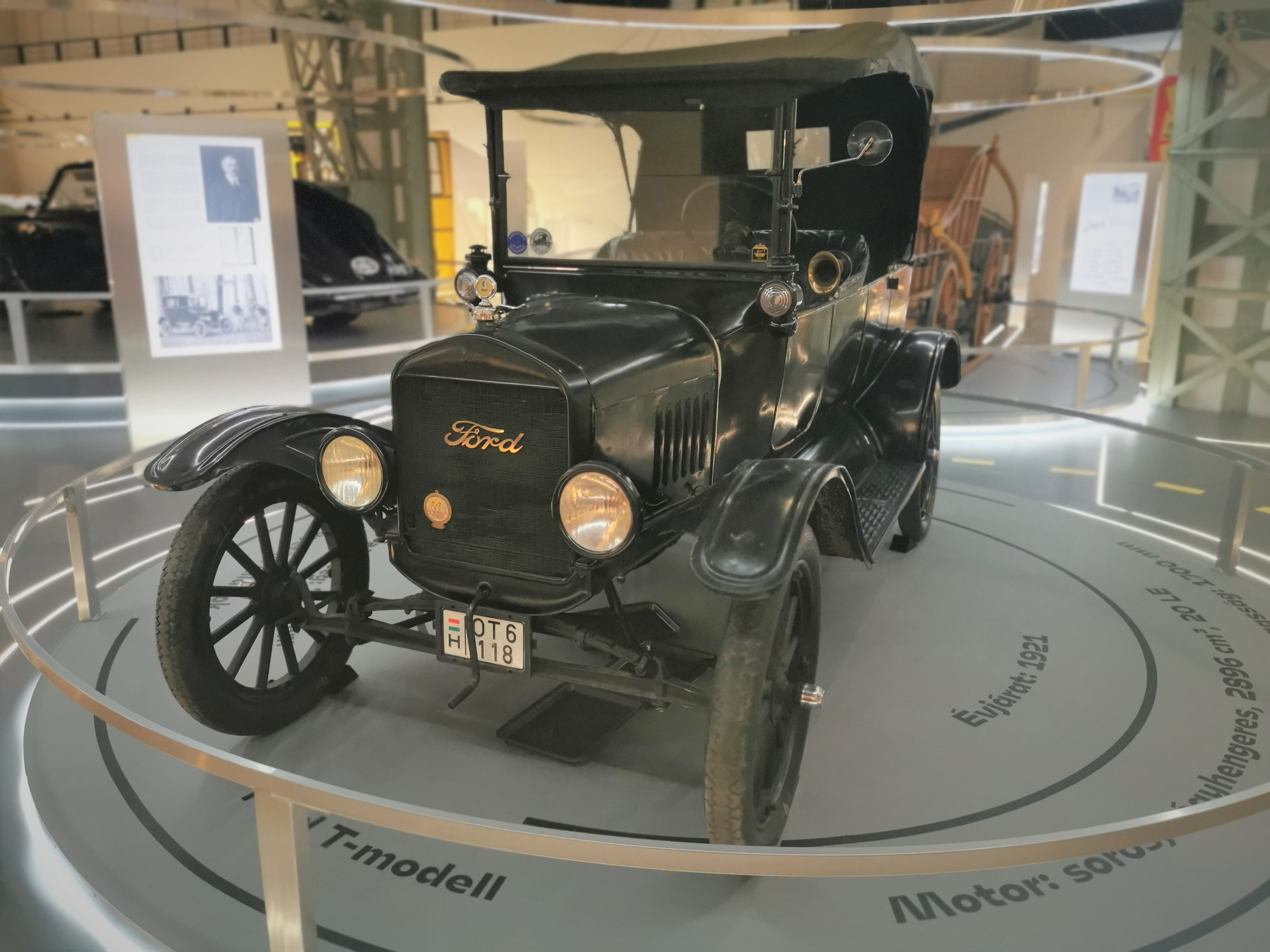
1921 Ford Model T

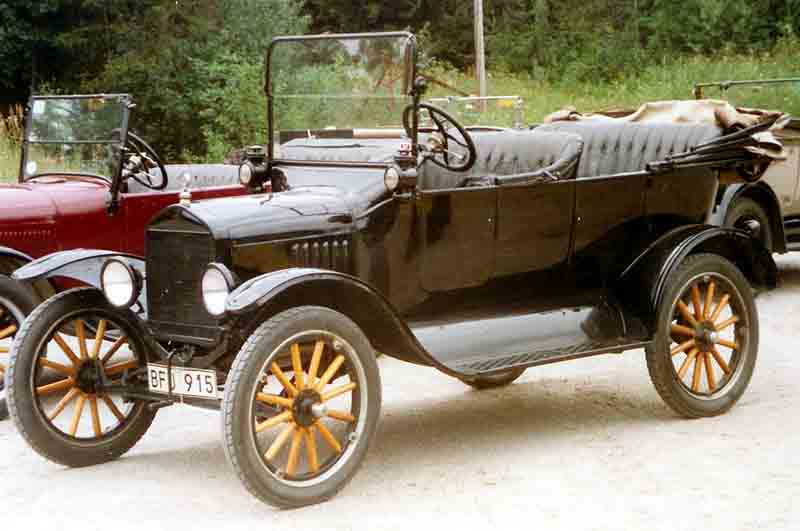
1921 touring

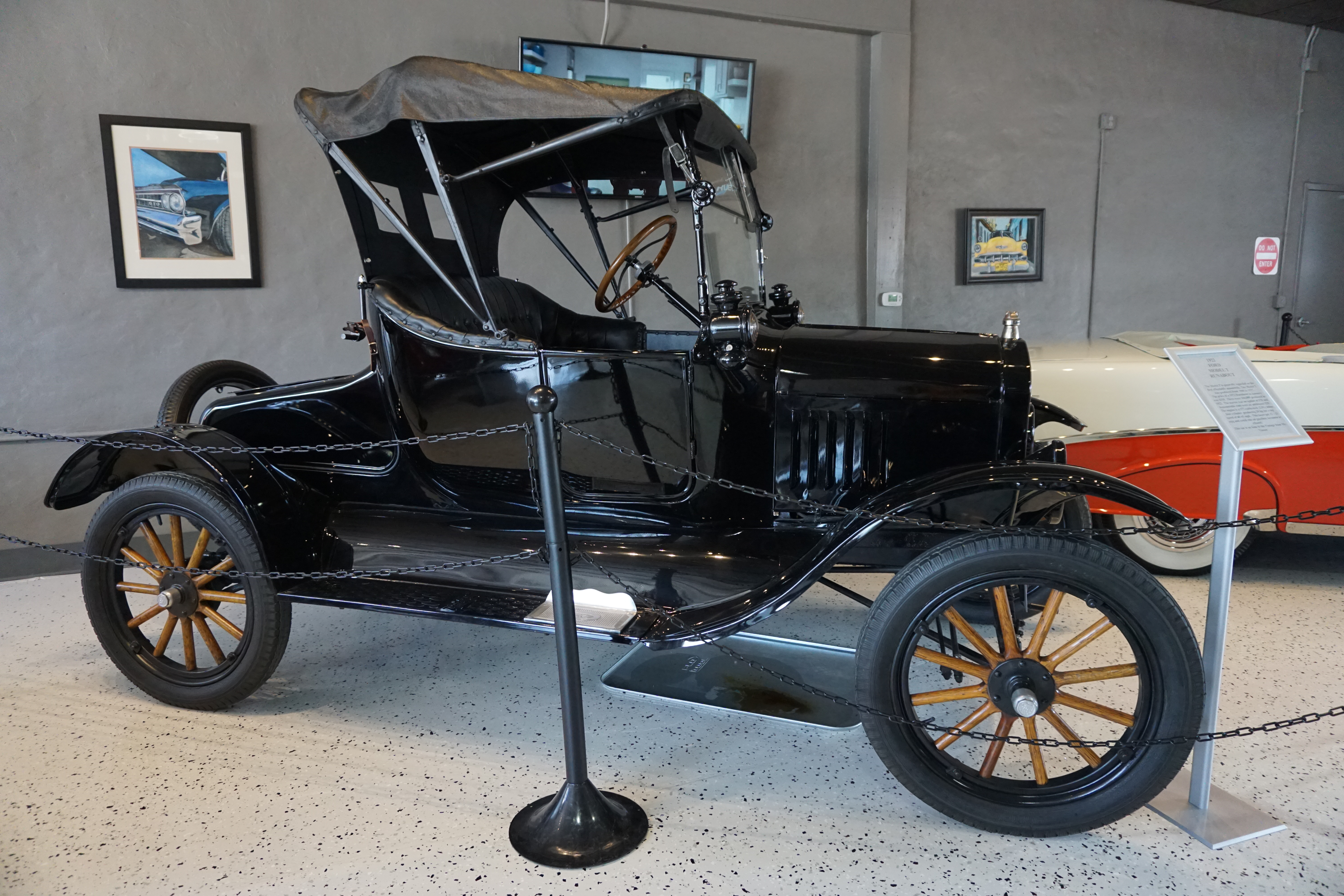
1922 Runabout

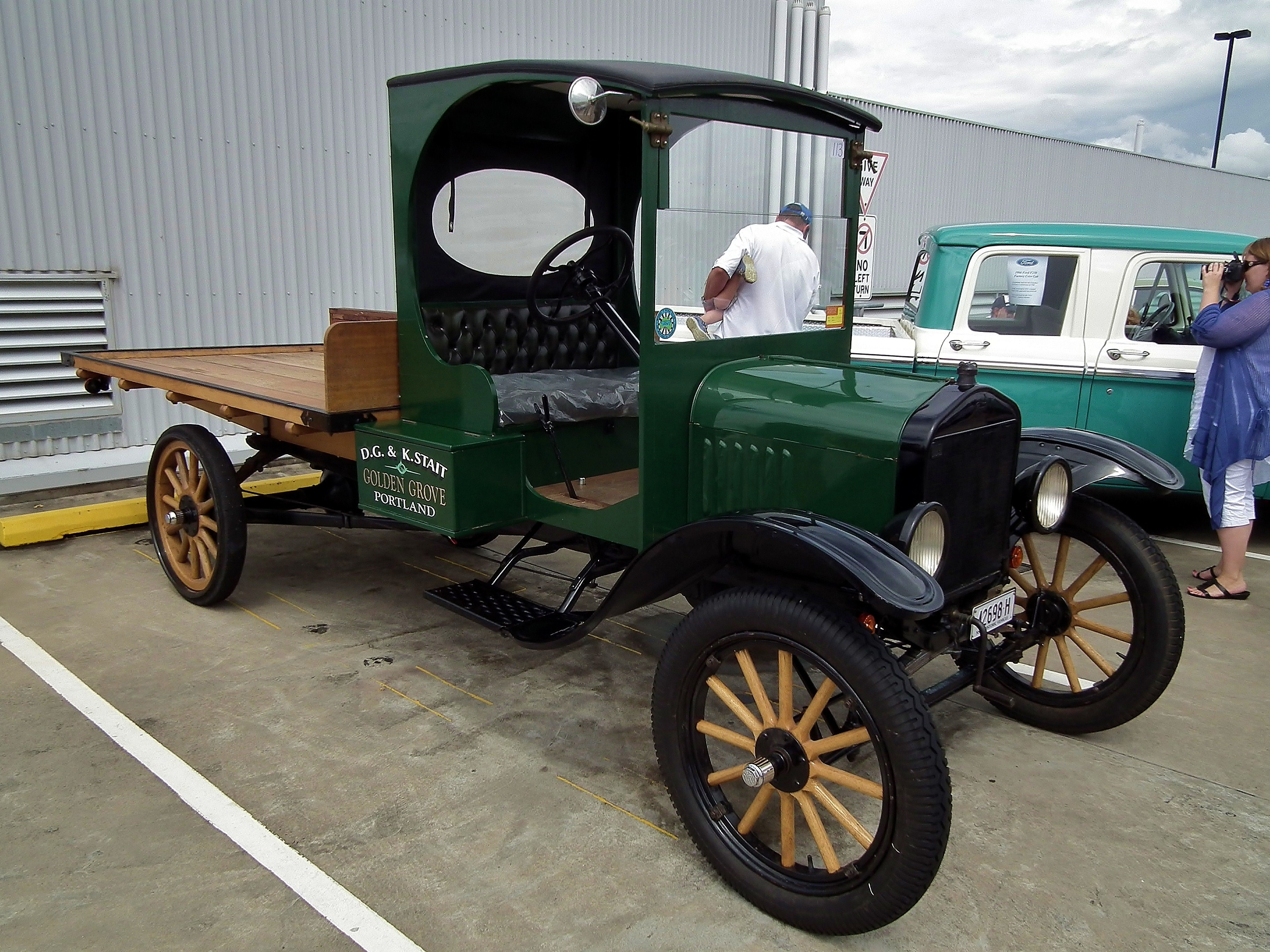
1922 flatbed truck

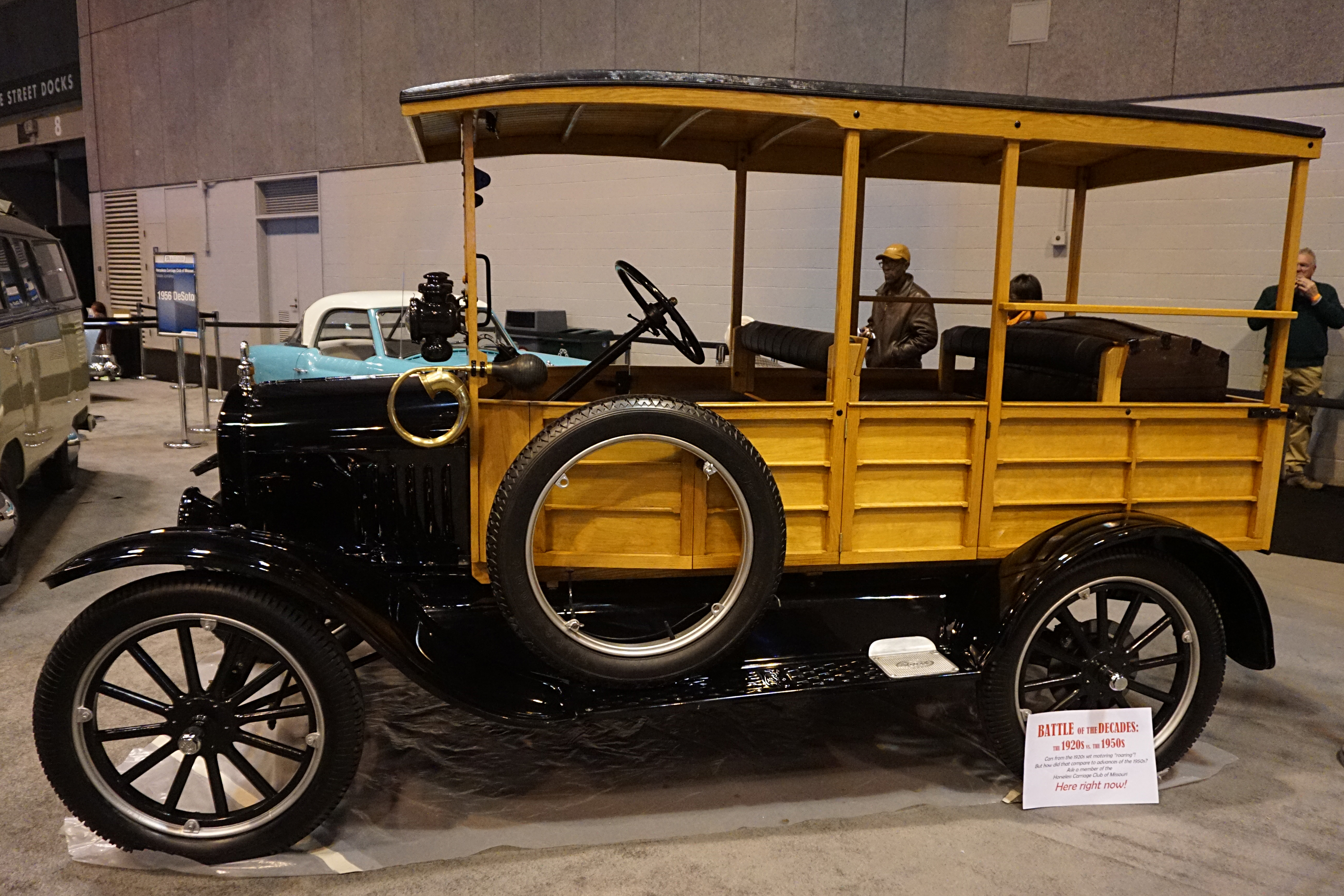
1923 Ford Model T depot hack

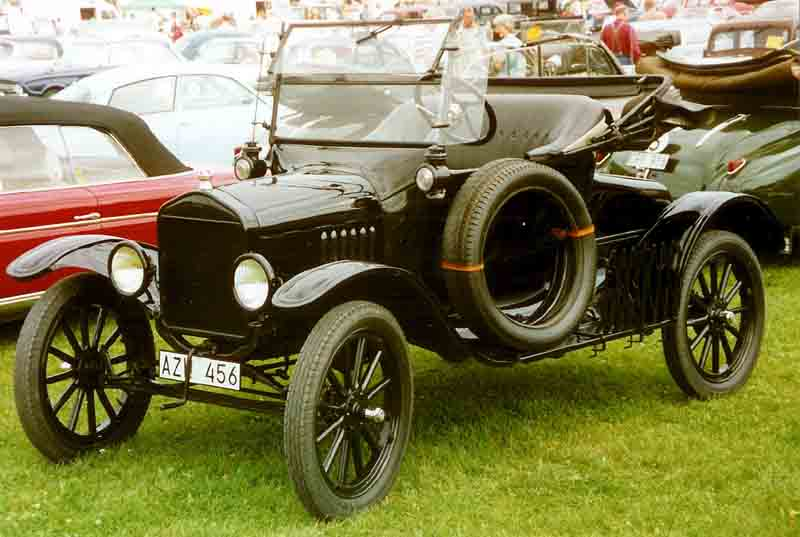
1923 Runabout (early '23 model)

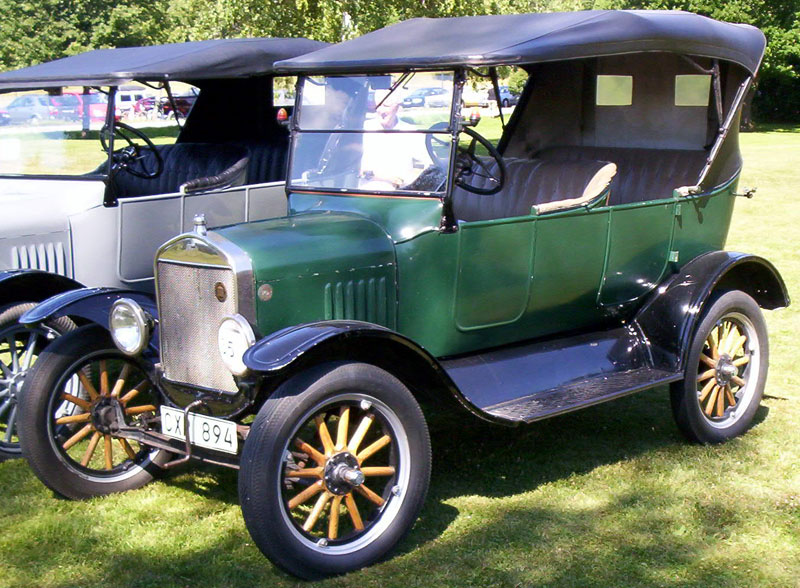
1924 touring – begin higher hood and slightly shorter cowl panel – late-1923 models were similar

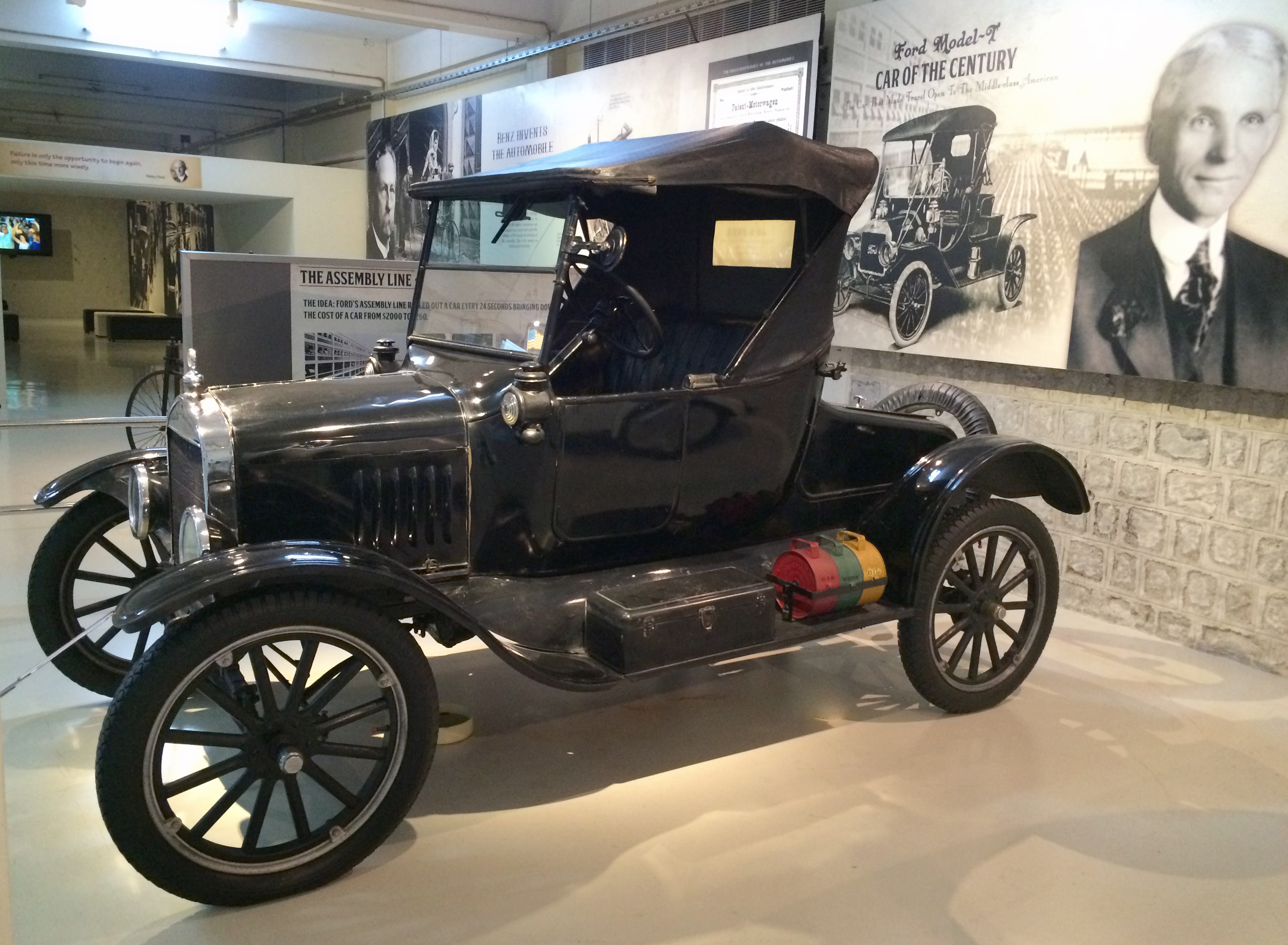
1924–1925 Runabout

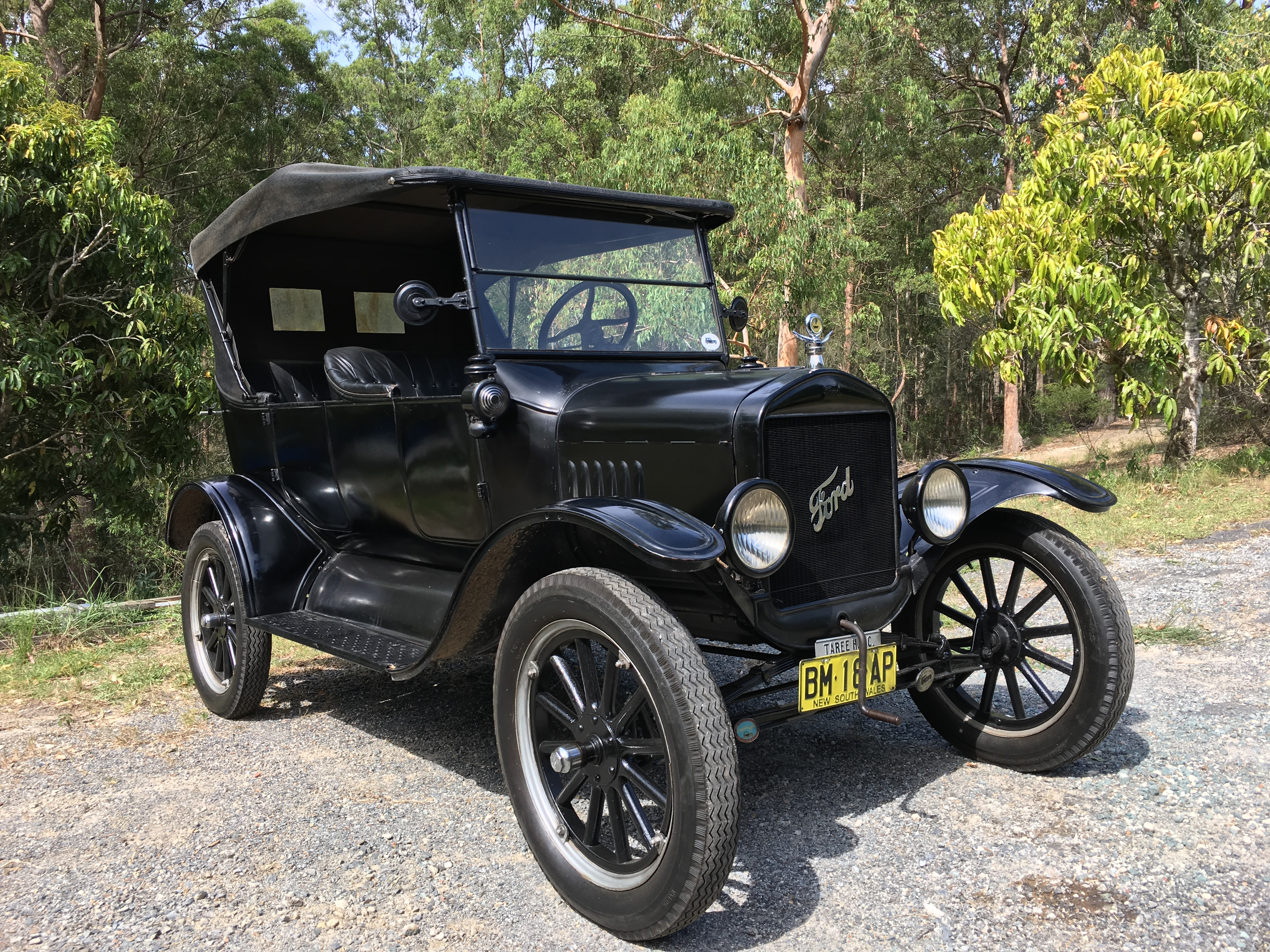
1925 touring – with the balloon tires and split rims, optional extras of the period

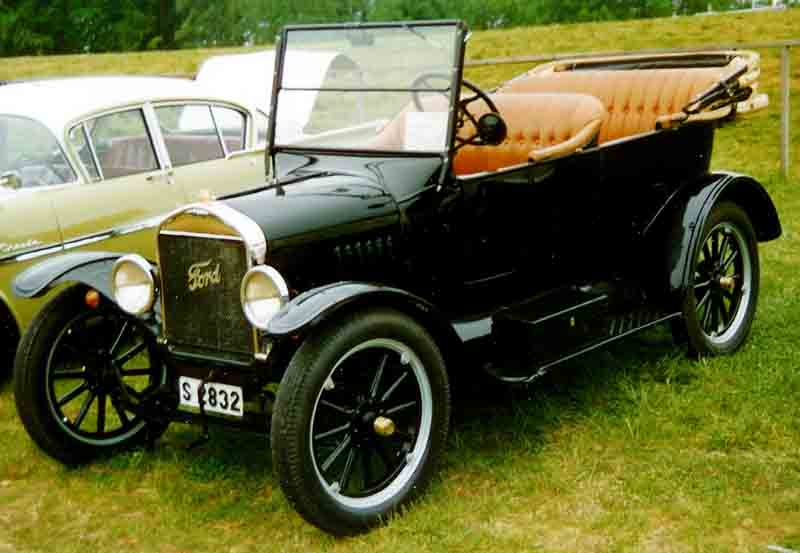
1925 touring

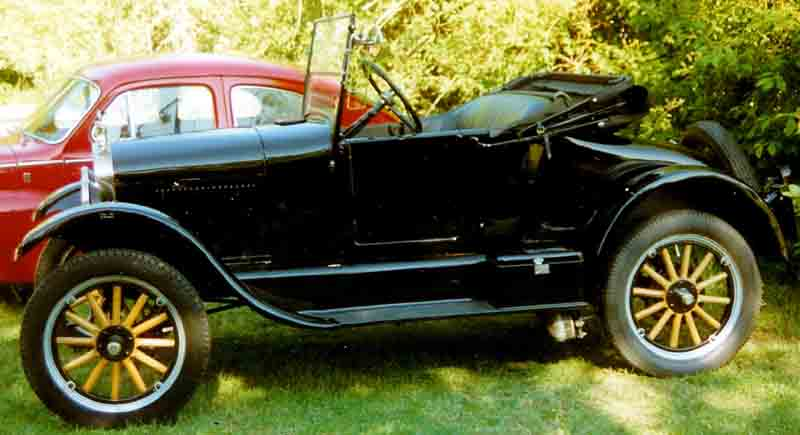
1926 Runabout – begin higher hood and longer cowl panel

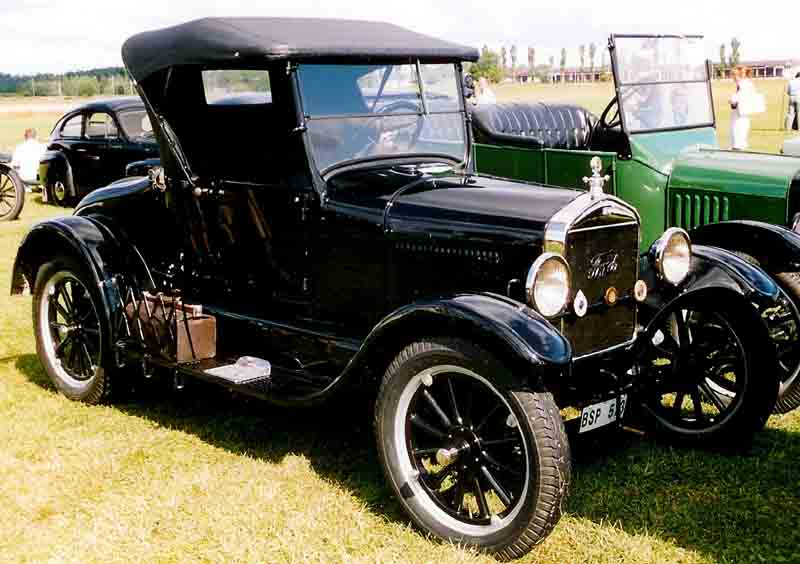
1927 Runabout

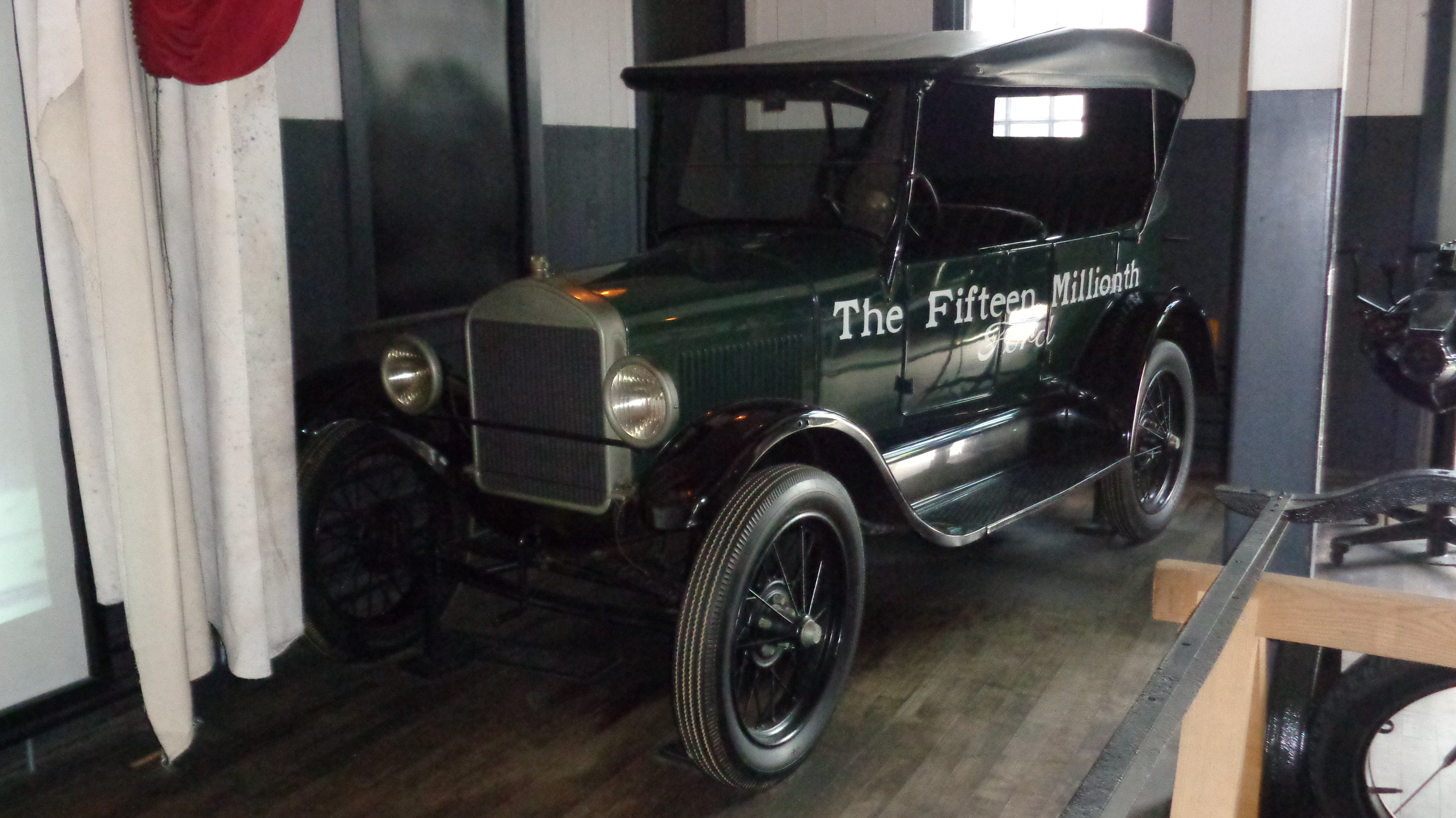
1927 touring – last Ford Model T built at Highland Park Ford Plant

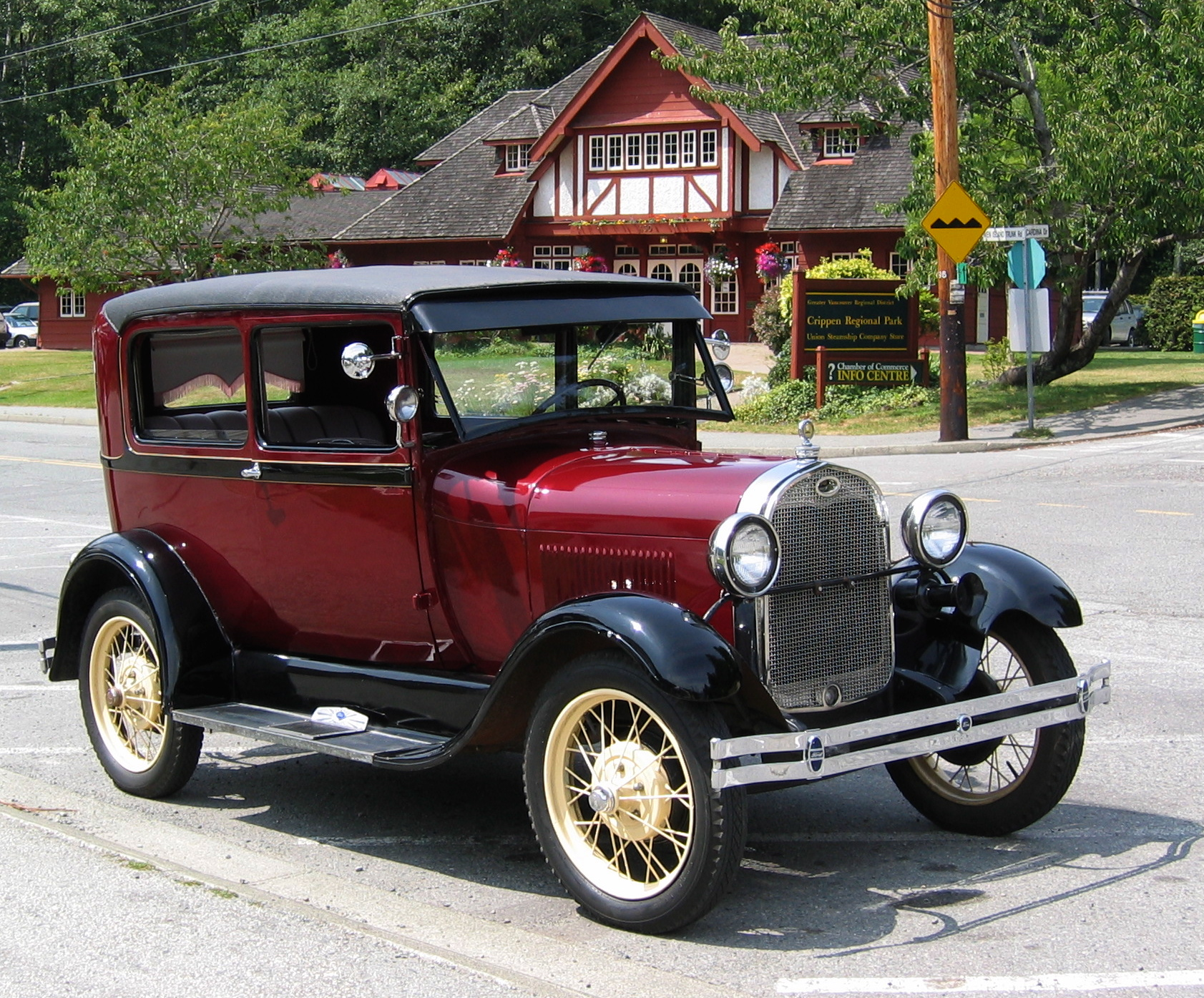
1928 Ford Model A Tudor sedan – shown for comparison, body is wider and has curved doors.

== See also ==
- Lakeside Foundry
- New Zealand RM class (Model T Ford) – a 1925 experimental railcar based on a Model T powertrain
- Piper J-3 Cub, the 1930s/40s American light aircraft that developed a similar degree of ubiquity in general aviation circles to the Model T

== Bibliography ==
- Clymer, Floyd (1955). Henry's wonderful Model T, 1908–1927. New York, NY, U.S.: McGraw-Hill. LCCN 55010405.
- Clymer, Floyd (1950). Treasury of Early American Automobiles, 1877–1925. New York, NY, U.S.: McGraw-Hill. LCCN 50010680.
- Dutton, William S. (1942). Du Pont: One Hundred and Forty Years. Charles Scribner's Sons. LCCN 42011897.
- Ford, Henry; Crowther, Samuel (1922), My Life and Work, Garden City, New York, USA: Garden City Publishing Company, Inc. Various republications, including ISBN 9781406500189. Original is public domain in U.S. Also available at Google Books.
- Georgano, G. N. (1985). Cars: Early and Vintage, 1886–1930. London, UK: Grange-Universal.
- Hounshell, David A. (1984), From the American System to Mass Production, 1800–1932: The Development of Manufacturing Technology in the United States, Baltimore, Maryland: Johns Hopkins University Press, ISBN 978-0-8018-2975-8, LCCN 83016269, OCLC 1104810110
- Kimes, Beverly Rae; Clark, Henry Austin Jr. (1989). Standard Catalog of America Cars: 1805–1942 (2nd ed.). Krause Publications. ISBN 9780873411110.
- Lacey, Robert (1986). Ford: The Men and the Machine. Boston, MA, U.S.: Little, Brown. ISBN 978-0-316-51166-7.
- Leffingwell, Randy (2002) [1998]. Ford Tractors. Borders. ISBN 0-681-87878-9.
- Lewis, David (1976). The Public Image of Henry Ford: An American Folk Hero and His Company. Detroit, MI, U.S.: Wayne State University Press. ISBN 978-0-8143-1553-8.
- Manly, Harold P. (1919). The Ford Motor Car and Truck; Fordson Tractor: Their Construction, Care and Operation. Chicago, IL, US: Frederick J. Drake & Co.
- McCalley, Bruce W. (1994). Model T Ford: The Car That Changed the World. Iola, WI, U.S.: Krause Publications. ISBN 0-87341-293-1.
- Nevins, Allan (1954). Ford: The Times, the Man, the Company. New York: Charles Scribner's Sons. pp. 385–590. LCCN 54-6305.
- Nevins, Allan; Hill, Frank Ernest (1957). Ford: Expansion and Challenge 1915–1933. New York: Charles Scribner's Sons. LCCN 57-9695.
- Pripps, Robert N.; Morland, Andrew (photographer) (1993). Farmall Tractors: History of International McCormick-Deering Farmall Tractors. Farm Tractor Color History Series. Osceola, WI, U.S.: MBI. ISBN 978-0-87938-763-1.
- Ross, Irwin (November 1974). "Ford's Fabulous Flivver". Gas Engine Magazine.
- Sedgwick, Michael (1972) [1962]. Early Cars. Octopus Books. ISBN 0-7064-0058-5.
- Ward, Ian, ed. (1974). The World of Automobiles. Vol. 13. London, UK: Orbis.
- Wik, Reynold M. (1972). Henry Ford and grass-roots America. Ann Arbor, MI, U.S.: University of Michigan Press. ISBN 978-0-472-97200-5.
