= Lakeside Foundry =

American building

Coordinates: 42°21′55.1″N 82°57′53.8″W

The Lakeside Foundry was located in Detroit, Michigan, United States. It still stands, although is no longer in business. It is on Lycaste St. South of Jefferson between Jefferson and Freud between St. Jean and Clairpointe. It opened in the late nineteenth century and was owned and operated by Alexander Russel Keys Sr.

In 1920 it increased its capital from $40,000 to 120,000.

The Lakeside Foundry had the contract for the manufacturing of the engines for the Ford Model T motor car. However, after a few years, Lakeside Foundry lost this contract when Henry Ford began building his own engines for his vehicles. The Foundry remained in operation for several years and then ceased manufacturing operations. The Keys family held onto the factory and used it for storage for their other economic pursuits.
