= List of defunct automobile manufacturers of the United States =

This is a list of defunct automobile manufacturers of the United States. They were discontinued for various reasons, such as bankruptcy of the parent company, mergers, or being phased out.

== A ==
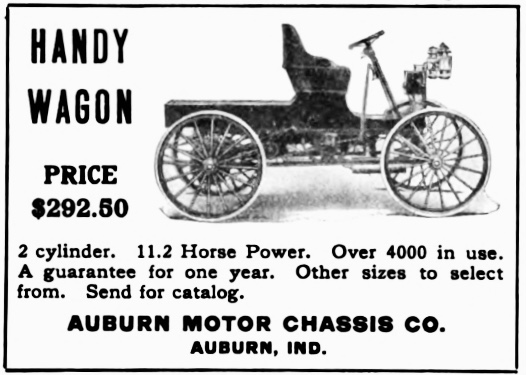
Auburn Motor Chassis (1912–1915)

- A Automobile Company (1910–1913)
  'Blue & Gold, Red John, model
- Abbott-Detroit (1909–1918)
  Moved to Cleveland and renamed to 'Abbott' in 1917.
- Abeln-Zehr (1911–1912)
  Renamed to 'Zehr' after departure of S. Abeln in 1912.
- AC Propulsion (1997–2003)
  tZero model
- Acme Motor Car Company (1903–1911)
- Adams Company (1905–1912)
  'Adams-Farwell' model
- Anger Engineering Company (1913–1915) (also known as A.E.C., but not the same company as the British A.E.C.)
- Aerocar Company (1905–1908)
- Aerocar International (1946–1987)
- Aircraft Products (1947)
  Airscoot model
- Airway (1949–1950)
- Ajax Motors Co. (1914–1915)
  Based in Seattle
- Ajax Motor Vehicle Company (1901–1903)
  Based in New York City
- Aland Motor Car Company (1916–1917)
- Albany Automobile Company (1907–1908)
- Alden Sampson Company (1904)
  Sampson model
- Albaugh-Dover Co. (1910–1911)
  Also known as Aldo
- All-Steel Motor Car Co. (1915–1916)
- Allen Motor Company (1913–1922)
  Based in Ohio
- Allen Iron & Steel Company (1913–1914)
  Based in Philadelphia
- Alpena Motor Car Company (1910–1914)
- Alter Motor Car Company (1914–1917)
- Altham (1896–1899)
- Alcoa (1920–1922)
  'Aluminum' model
- Amalgamated Machinery Corp (1917–1919)
- Ambassador (1921–1925)
- American Automobile Manufacturing Company (1911–1912)
  Jonz and American models. Based in Indiana.
- American Automobile and Power Company (1904–1905)
  Populaire model
- American Automobile Co. (1899–1901)
  Based in New York
- American Cyclecar Co. (1914)
- American Austin (1929–1935)
- American Bantam (1935–1956)
- American Beauty (1918–1920)
- American Electric (1913–1914)
  Based in Michigan
- American Electric Vehicle Co. (1896–1902)
  Based in Chicago
- American Locomotive Automobile Company (1908–1913)
  Also known as Alco
- American Metal Wheel and Auto Co (1907)
  Juvenile model
- American Mors (1906–1909)
- American Motor Car Company (1906–1914)
- American Motor Company (1895–1902)
- American Motor Carriage Co. (1902–1904)
- American Motor Vehicle Co. (1916–1920)
  Junior model
- American Motors (1954–1987)
  Also known as AMC
- American Motors Co. (1906–1924)
  Balanced Six model. Based in New Jersey
- American Motors Incorporated (1917–1922)
  Amco model. Based in New York
- American Power Carriage (1899–1900)
- American Simplex (1906–1913)
  Renamed to Amplex in 1910
- American Steam Automobile Co. (1924–1931)
  Based in Massachusetts
- American Steam Truck Co. (1922–1924)
  Based in Illinois
- American Voiturette (1913–1914)
  Car-Nation models
- American Waltham (1898–1899)
- American Wheelock
- Ames, F.A. Co. (1910–1922)
  Renamed to 'Ames Body Corporation' in 1915
- Ams-Sterling (1917)
- Anchor Buggy & Carriage Co. (1910–1911)
- Anderson Automobile Co. (1916–1925)
- Anderson Carriage Manufacturing Co. (1907–1910)
- Anderson Machine Co. (1906)
- Anger Engineering Company (1912–1915)
  Also known as A.E.C.
- Angus (1907–1910)
  Fuller model
- Anheuser-Busch (1905)
  Built in St. Louis by the beer company
- Anhut (1909–1910)
- Ansted (1926–1927)
- Ansted-Lexington (1922)
- Anthony (1899–1900)
- Apex Motor Car Company (1920–1922)
  Ace model
- Apperson (1902–1926)
- Apple Automobile Company (1917–1918)
- Arabian (1915–1917)
- ArBenz (1911–1918)
- Ardsley Motor Car Co. (1905–1906)
- Argo Electric Vehicle Co. (1912–1916)
  Based in Saginaw, Michigan.
- Argo Motor Co. (1914–1916)
  Based in Jackson, Michigan.
- Ariel Company (1905–1907)
- Aristos
- Armstrong Electric (1885–1902)
- Arnolt, S.H. Inc. (1953–1954)
- Artzberger (1904)
- Atlas Automobile Co. (1906–1907)
  Based in Pittsburgh
- Atlas Motor Car Co. (1907–1913)
  Based in Massachusetts. Renamed to 'Atlas-Knight' in 1912.
- Auburn Automobile Co. (1900–1936)
  Based in Indiana
- Auburn Motor Chassis (1912–1915)
- Aultman (1901)
- Aurora Automobile Co. (1905–1906)
  Formerly 'Aurora Carriage Top Company'
- Aurora Automatic Machinery Co. (1907–1909)
- Austen
- Austin Automobile Company (1901–1921)
- Auto-Bug (1909–1910)
- Auto Cub (1956)
- Auto Cycle (1906–1907)
- Auto Dynamic (1900–1902)
- Autoette Electric Car Co. (1948–1970)
- Automatic Transportation Co. (1921)
- Automobile Fore Carriage (1900)
- Automobile Voiturette
- Automotor (1901–1904)
- Autoparts Manufacturing Co. (1910)
  King-Remick model
- Auto Tricar (1914)
- Auto Vehicle
- Avanti Motor Co. (1963–2007)
- Avery Company (1891–1928) Tractor, truck and car manufacturer

== B ==
Baldwin advertisement (1901)

- Babcock, H.H. Company (1909–1913) H.H. Babcock Company
- Babcock Electric Carriage Co. (1906–1912)
- Baby Moose (1914)
- Bachelle Electric (1900–1904)
- Bacon (1901, 1919–1920) Bacon (Automobilhersteller)
- Badger (1910–1911)
  Based in Wisconsin
- Bailey (1907–1910) Bailey Automobile Company
- Baker Electric (1899–1916)
  Based in Cleveland
- Balboa (1924–1925)
- Baldner (1900–1903)
- Baldwin (1899–1901)
- Ball Steam (1868, 1902)
- Balzer (1894–1900)
- Banker (1905)
- Bantam (1914)
  Distinct from American Bantam
- Barbarino (1923–1925)
- Barley Motor Car Co. (1916–1929)
- Barrows Electric (1895–1899)
- Bates Automobile Company (1904–1905)
- Bauer (1914–1916)
- Bay State (1907–1908)
- Bean-Chamberlain Manufacturing Co. (1901–1902)
  Hudson model
- Beardsley (1914–1917)
- Beechcraft (1946)
- Beggs (1919–1923)
- Belden (1907–1911)
- Bell Motor Car Company (1916–1922)
  Based in Pennsylvania
- Belmont Electric Auto Co. (1909–1910)
- Belmont (1916)
- Bendix (1908–1909)
- Benham Manufacturing Co. (1914)
- Ben Hur (1917–1918)
  Based in Cleveland
- Benner (1909)
- Berg (1903–1905)
  Based in Cleveland
- Bergdoll (1910–1913)
- Berwick Auto Car Co. (1904)
- Berkshire (1905–1912)
- Bertolet (1908–1910)
- Bethlehem (1917–1926) cars from (1919–1920)
- Beverly (1904)
- Bi-Autogo (1908–1912)
- Biddle (1915–1922)
- Beisel Motorette Company (1914)
- Bimel (1916–1917)
- Binghamton Electric (1920)
- Binney & Burnham (1901–1902)
- Birch Motor Cars (1916–1923)
- Birmingham Motors (1921–1923)
- Black (1893, 1896–1900)
- Black Motor Company (1908–1910) Renamed to 'Black-Crow' in 1909
- Blackhawk (1903)
- Blackhawk (1929–1930)
- Bliss (1906)
- B.L.M. (1906–1907)
- Blomstrom (C.H.) Motor Co. (1902–1903)
- Blomstrom Manufacturing Co. (1907–1908)
  Gyroscope model, based in Michigan.
- Blood Brothers Auto and Machine Company (1902–1906)
- BMC (1952)
  Distinct from the British brand
- Boardman (1946)
- Bobbi-Kar (1945–1947)
- Boisselot (1901)
- Borbein Electric (1900, 1904–1909)
- Borland Electric (1910–1916)
- Boss Steam Car (1897–1909)
- Boston-Amesbury (1902–1903)
- Boston High Wheel (1907)
- Bour-Davis Co. (1915–1922)
- Bournonville
- Bowman Motor Car Company (1921–1922)
- Bramwell (1904–1905)
- Bramwell-Robinson (1899–1902)
- Brasie (1914–1916)
- Brazier (1902–1903)
- Brecht (1901–1903)
- Brennan (1902–1908)
- Brew-Hatcher (1904–1905)
- Brewster & Co. (1915–1925, 1934–1937)
- Briggs and Stratton (1919–1923)
  Smith Flyer model
- Briggs-Detroiter Motor Car Co. (1912–1917)
- Briggs Manufacturing Company (1909–1953)
- Brightwood
- Briscoe Motor Co. (1913–1923)
- Bristol (1903–1904)
- Broc Electric (1909–1916)
  Based in Cleveland
- Brogan (1946–1950)
- Brook (1920–1921)
- Brooks Steamer (1927)
- Brown (1914)
- Brownie (1916)
- Browniekar (1908–1911)
- Brunn & Company (1908–1941)
- Brush Motor Car Company (1907–1912)
- Bryan Steam Car (1918–1923)
- Buckeye (1895)
  Based in Indiana
- Buckmobile (1903–1905)
- Buffalo Automobile and Auto-Bi Company (1900–1902)
- Buffalo Electric (1912–1915)
- Buffum (1901–1907)
- Buggy Car Company (1908–1909)
- Bugmobile (1907–1909)
  Based in Chicago
- Burdick (1909)
- Burg (1910–1913)
- Burns (1908–1912)
- Burrows (1914–1915)
- Burtt Manufacturing Co. (1902–1906)
  Cannon model
- Bush (1916–1924)
- B-Z-T Car Company (1924–1915)

== C ==
B.G. Casler advertisement (1901)

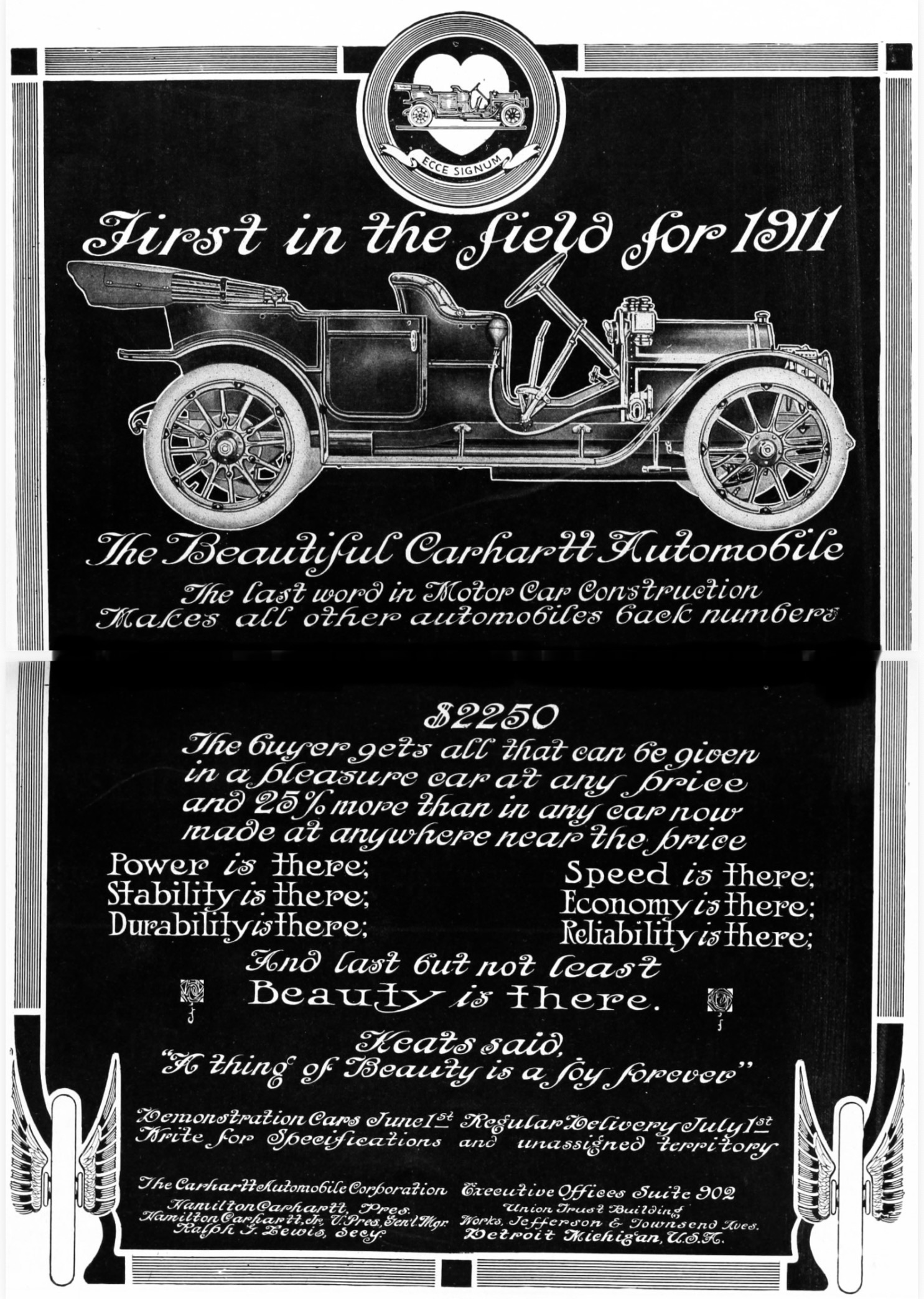
Carhartt Four (July 1910–1911)

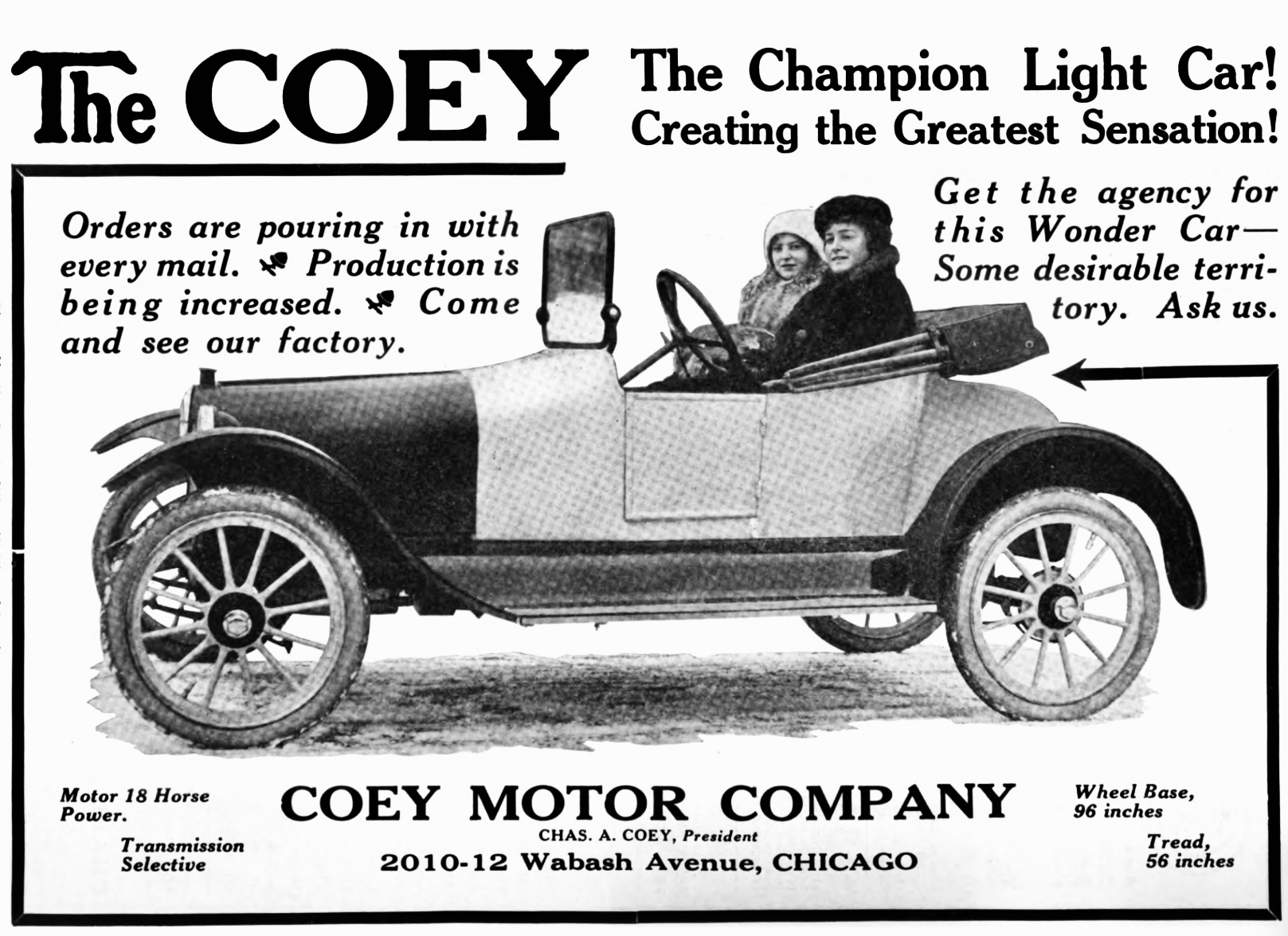
Coey (1915)

- C-A-C (1914–1915)
- Cady Automobile Company (1899)
- California (1900–1902, 1910)
- Caloric (1903–1904)
- Camelot Motors (1981)
- Cameron (1903–1920)
- Campbell (1918–1919)
- Canda (1900–1902)
- Cannon (1902–1906)
- Canoo (2017–2025)
- Cantono Electric (1904–1907)
- Car de Luxe (1906–1910)
- Carbon Motors Corporation (2003–2013)
- Cardway (1923–1924)
- Carhart (1871)
- Carhartt Automobile Company (1910–1912)
- Carlson (1904)
- Carrol
- Carroll (1908)
  Distinct from Carrol
- Carroll Six (1921–1922)
- Carter Twin-Engine (1907–1908)
- Cartercar (1905–1916)
- Carthage (1914–1915)
- Case (1911–1927)
  Based in Wisconsin
- Casler (1901)
- C.B (1917–1918)
- Ceco (1914–1915)
  Based in Chicago
- Centaur (1902–1903)
- Central (1905–1906)
- Century (1900–1903)
  'Tourist' model
- Century Motor Company (1911–1915)
  Renamed to 'Century Electric Car Company' in 1915
- Century Steamer (1906)
- Chadwick Engineering Works (1904–1916, 1960)
- Chalfant (1905–1912)
- Chalmers-Detroit (1908–1914)
  Renamed to Chalmers in 1911
- Champion (1916)
- Chandler (1913–1929)
- Chapman Electric (1899–1901)
- Charles Abresch Company (1899–circa 1965)
- Chase (1907–1912)
- Checker Motors Corporation (1922–2010)
- Chelsea (1914)
- Chicago (1902)
- Chicago Electric (1899–1901)
- Chicago Motor Buggy (1908)
- Chicago Recording Scale Co (1906–1907)
  Apollo model
- Chicago Steam Car (1905–1907)
- Chief (1908)
- Christie (1904–1910)
- Christman (1901–1905, 1907)
- Church-Field (1912–1913)
- Church Manufacturing Co (1903–1904)
  Lenawee model
- Cincinnati Steamer (1903–1904)
- CinO (1910–1913)
- Citicar (1974–1976)
- Clark (1901)
- Clark Electric (1903–1905)
- Clark & Company (1903–1904)
  Clarkmobile model
- Classic (1916–1917, 1920)
- Cleburne
- Clénet Coachworks (1975–1980)
- Clermont
- Cleveland (1902–1904)
  Built in Cleveland
- Cleveland (1905–1909)
- Cleveland (1914)
- Cleveland (1919–1926)
- Climber (1919–1924)
- Clinton E. Woods Electric (1897–1901)
- Clipper (1956)
- Clough Steamer (1869)
- Cloughley (1896–1903)
- Club Car (1910–1911)
- Clyde Special
- Clymer (1908)
  Based in Missouri
- Coates-Goshen (1908–1910)
- Coats Steam Car (1921–1923)
- Coda (2009–2013)
- Coey-Mitchell Automobile Company (1901–1902) + (1913–1917)
- Coggswell (1910–1911)
- Colburn (1906–1911)
  Based in Denver
- ColbyDenver (1911–1914)
- Cole Motor Car Company (1909–1925)
  Based in Indianapolis
- Colonial Motors Corporation (1921–1922)
- Colonial Electric Car Company (1912)
- Colt (1907)
  Based in New York
- Columbia (1897–1913)
- Columbian Electric
- Columbia Motors (1916–1924)
- Columbian Electric (1914–1917)
  Distinct from 'Columbia Electric'
- Columbus Buggy Company (1907–1908)
- Columbus Electric (1903–1915)
  Based in Ohio
- Comet (1917–1922)
  Based in Illinois
- Comet (1946–1951)
- Commerce (1907–1908)
- Commercial Motor Truck Company
  Based in Ohio
- Commodore Motors Corporation (1921–1922)
- Commonwealth (1917–1922)
- Commuter Cars (1998)
- Comuta-Car (1979–1982) (See its predecessor, the Citicar)
- Conrad (1900–1903)
- Continental (1907–1908)
- Continental (1914)
  Based in Minneapolis and Chicago
- Continental (1933–1934)
- Continental (1956–1957)
- Corbin (1904–1912)
- Corbin (1999–2003)
- Corbitt (1907–1914)
- Cord (1929–1932,1936–1937)
- Corinthian (1922–1923)
- Cornelian (1914–1915)
- Cornish-Friedberg
- Cornish-Friedberg Motor Car Co (1907–1909)
- Correja (1909–1914)
- Corwin (1905–1906)
  Gas-au-lec model
- Cosmopolitan (1907–1910)
  Distinct from the Nash Cosmopolitan
- Cotta Steam (1901–1903)
- Country Club (1903–1904)
- Courier (1904–1905)
- Courier (1909–1911)
- Courier Car Co (1912)
  'Clermont' model
- Covert (1902–1907)
- Coyote Special (1909–1910)
- C.R. Patterson and Sons (1915–1939), maker of the Patterson-Greenfield automobile and later buses and trucks.
- Craig-Toledo (1907)
- Crane (1912–1920)
  Renamed to Crane-Simplex in 1915
- Crane & Breed (1912–1917)
- Crawford (1904–1923)
- Crescent (1913–1914)
- Crestmobile (1901–1905)
- Cricket Cyclecar Company (1913–1914)
- Criterion
- Crompton (1902–1905)
- Crosley (1939–1952)
- Crouch (1894–1900)
- Crow-Elkhart (1911–1923)
- Crowdus Electric (1899–1902)
- Crown (1905–1907)
- Crowther (1915–1917)
  Renamed to 'Crowther-Duryea' in 1917
- Croxton-Keeton (1909–1914)
  Renamed to 'Croxton' in 1911
- Cruiser (1917–1919)
- Culver (1905)
- Cunningham (1907–1936)
- Cunningham Sports Cars (1951–1955)
- Clark-Carter Automobile Co (1909–1913)
  Renamed to Cutting Motor Car Company in 1911; defunct c. 1912; last model year 1913.
- C.V.I. Motor Car Co (1907–1908)

== D ==
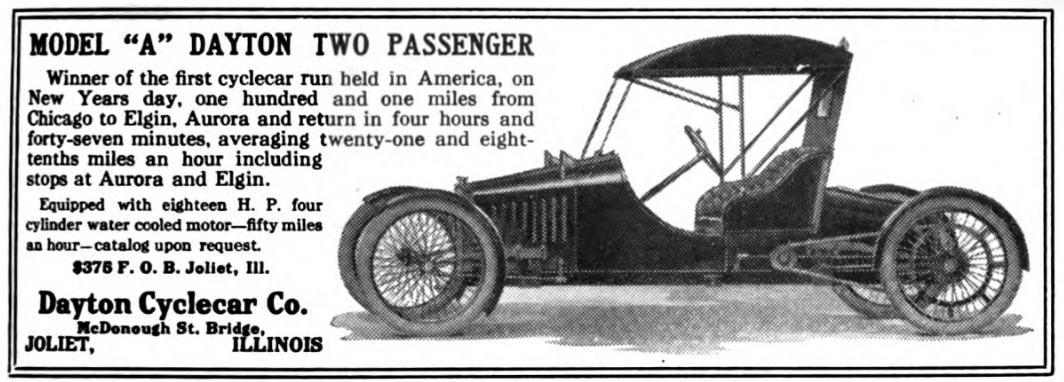
Dayton Cyclecar Model A (1914)

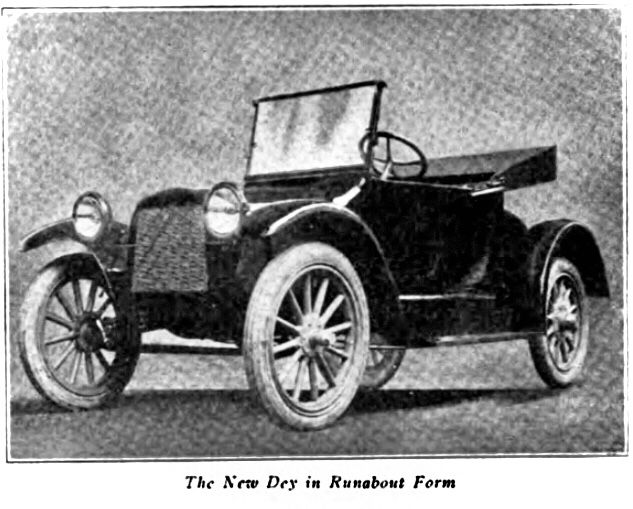
Dey Electric (1917–1919)

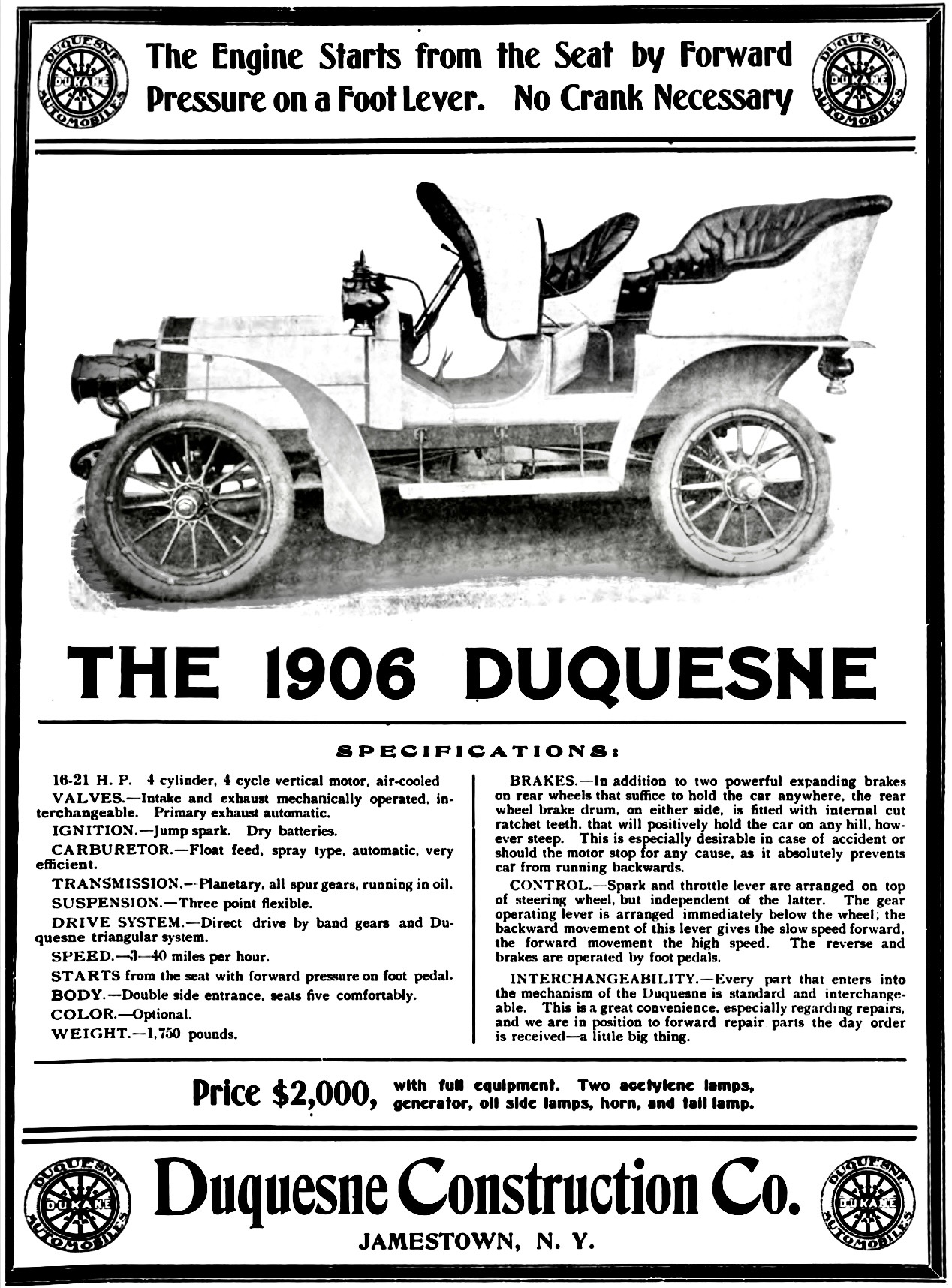
Duquesne advertisement (1905)

- Detroit Air-Cooled Car Company (1922–1923)
- Dagmar (1922–1927)
- Dale (1974)
- Daniels (1916–1924)
- Dan Patch (1910–1911)
- Darby Motor Car Company (1909–1910)
- Darling (1901–1902)
- Darrin (1946, 1955–1958)
- Davenport (1902)
- Davis (1908–1929)
- Davis Cyclecar Company (1914)
- Davis (1947–1949)
- Davis Steam Car (1921)
- Davis Totem (1921–1922)
- Dawson (1904)
- Dawson Auto-Mobile (1899–1901)
- Day Automobile Company (1911–1914)
- Dayton (1914)
- Dayton Cyclecar (1914) Dayton Cyclecar
- Dayton Electric (1911–1915)
- Deal (1905–1911)
- Decatur (1910–1911)
- Decatur (1914–1915)
- Decker (1902–1903)
- Deere-Clark (1906; Deere 1907)
- Deering Magnetic (1918–1919)
- Defiance Motor Truck (1915–1920)/>
- De La Vergne (1895–1896)
- Delling (1924–1927)
- Delmore (1921–1923)
- DeLorean Motor Company (1975–1982)
- De Luxe Motor Car Company (1906–1908)
- De Mars Electric (1905–1906; Blakeslee Electric 1906; Williams Electric 1906–1907; Byrider Electric 1907–1910)
- DeMot or DeMotCar (1910–1911)
- De Motte (1904)
- Denneed (1916)
- Derain (1908–1911)
- Desberon (1901–1904)
- De Schaum (1908–1909)
- Des Moines (1902)
- De Soto Motor Car Company (1913–1914)
- DeSoto (1928–1961)
- De Tamble (1908–1913)
- Detroit Automobile Company (1899–1901)
- Detroit Automobile Manufacturing Company (1905)
- Detroit Auto Vehicle Company (1904–1908)
- Detroit Cyclecar Company (1913–1914)
- Detroit-Dearborn Motor Car Company (1910–1911)
- Detroit Electric (1907–1939)
- Detroiter (1912–1917)
- Detroit-Oxford Motor Car Company (1905–1906)
- Detroit Steam Motors Corporation (1922)
- De Vaux-Hall Motors Company (1931–1932; Continental-De Vaux 1932)
- De Vaux Continental (1932–1934)
- DeWitt (1909–1910)
- Dewabout (1900–1901)
- Dey Electric (1917–1919)
- Dey Griswold (1895–1898)
- Diamond (1914–1915)
- Diamond T (1905–1967)
- Diana (1925–1928)
- Dietrich Inc. (1925–1936)
- Dile (1914–1917)
- Dingfelder Motor Company (1903)
- Dino (1965)
- Disbrow (1917–1918)
- Dispatch (1910)
- Dixie (1908–1910)
- Dixie (1916)
- Dixie Flyer (1916–1923)
- Doble steam car (1914–1918, 1922–1931)
- Dodge (A.M.) Company (1914–1915)
- Dodgeson Motors (1926)
- DODO (1912)
- Dolson (J.L.) & Sons (1904–1907)
- Dorris Motors Corporation (1906–1926)
- Dort Motor Car Company (1915–1924)
- Douglas (1918–1919)
- Downing Motor Company (1913–1915)
- Dragon Automobile Company (1906–1908)
- Drake (1921–1922)
- Drexel (1916–1917)
- Driggs-Seabury (1915; Driggs 1921–1923)
- Drummond (1916–1917)
- Dual-Ghia (1956–1958)
- Duck (Jackson model)
- Dudly Tool Company (1913–1915)
- Dudgeon Steam (1857, 1866)
- Duer (1907–1910)
- Duesenberg (1920–1937)
- Dumont
- Dunn (1916–1918)
- Duplex (1908–1909)
- Du Pont (1919–1931)
- Duquesne (1904–1906)
- Durant Motors (1921–1931)
- Durocar (1906–1911)
- Duryea (1893–1917) First American automobile manufacturer
- Dyke (or St Louis) (1899–1901; Dyke-Britton 1904)
- Dymaxion (1933)

== E ==
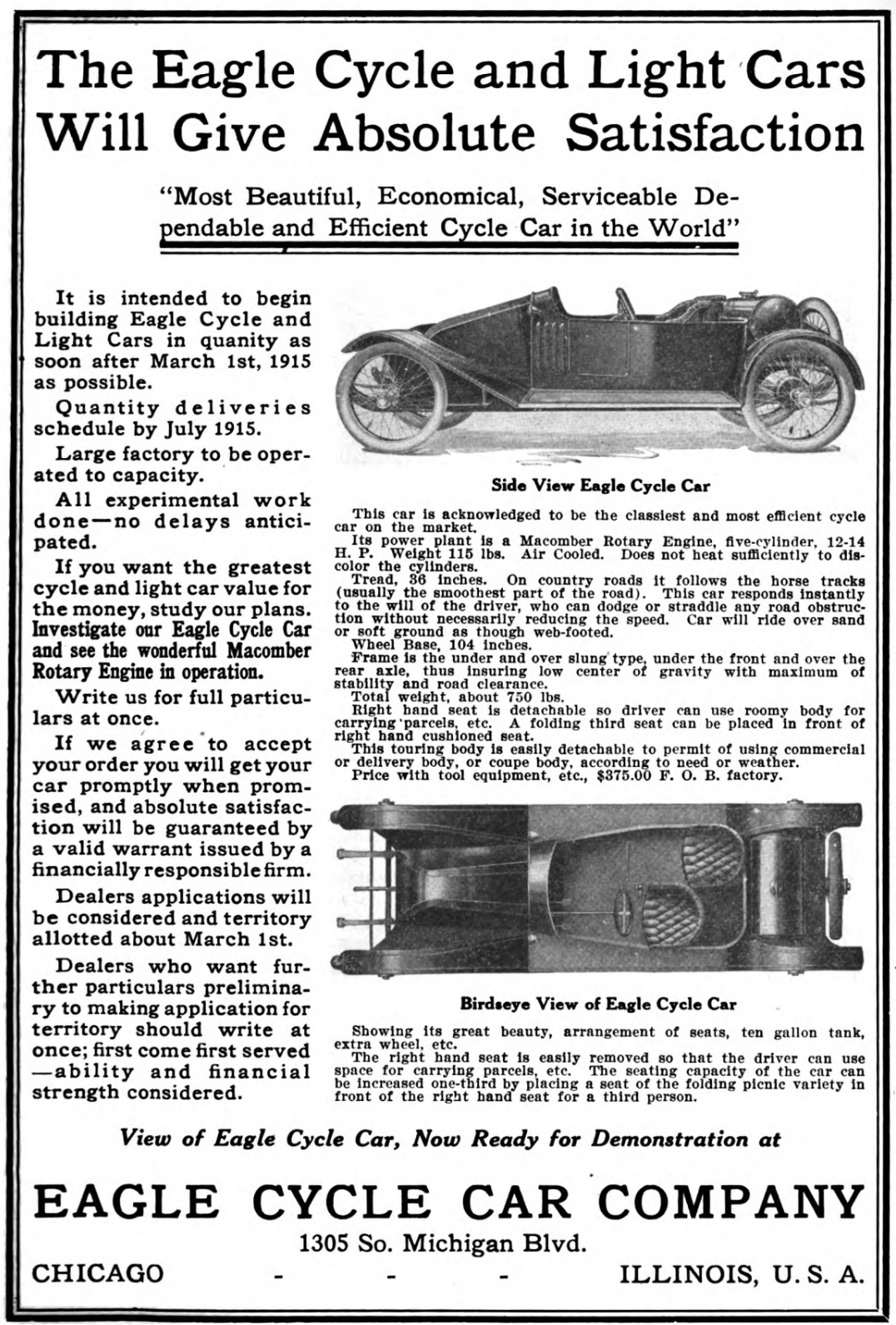
Eagle Cycle Car advertisement (1915)

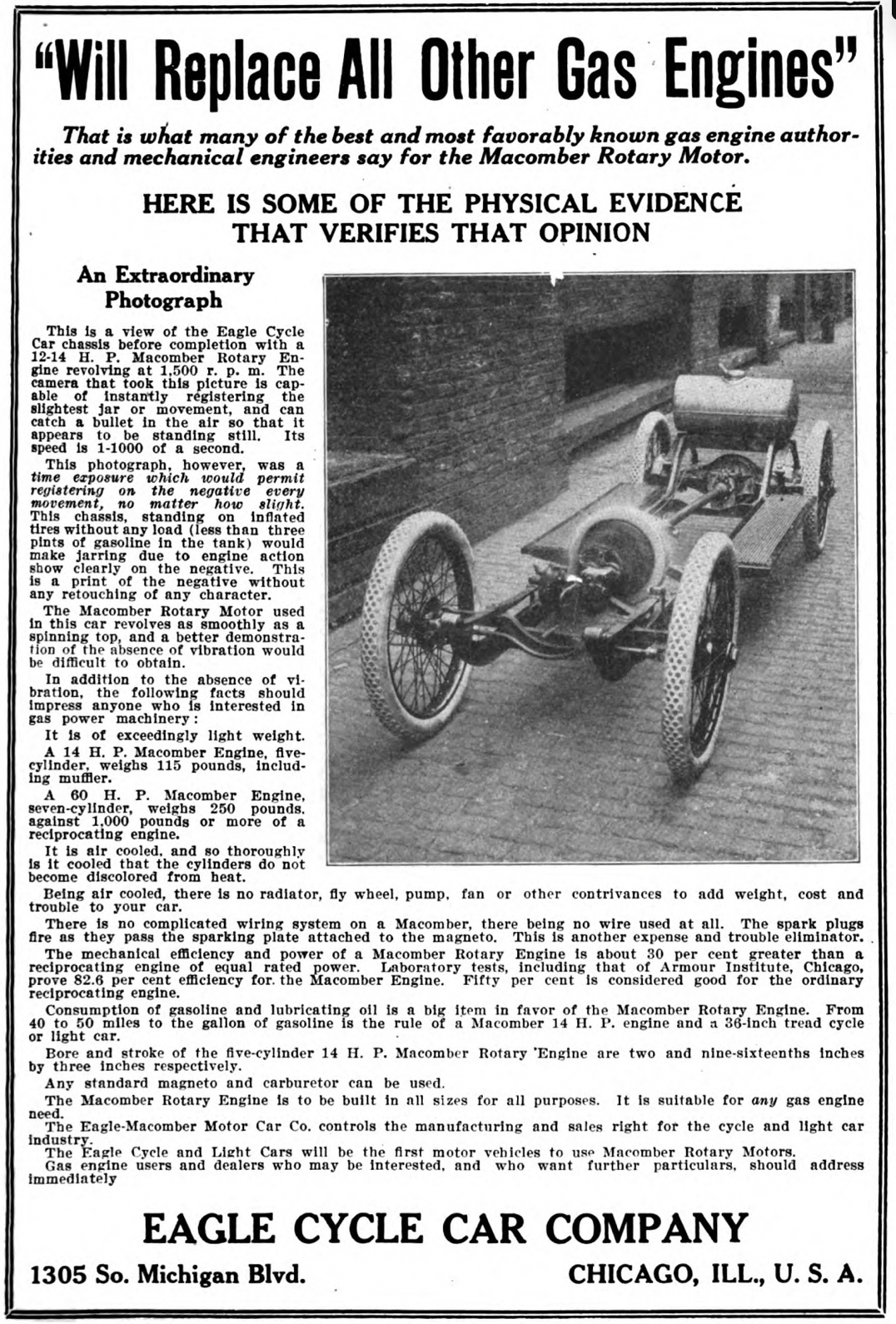
Eagle Cycle Car advertisement rotary engine (1915)

- Eagle (1905–1909)
- Eagle (1988–1998)
- Eagle Cycle Car (1914–1918)
- Eagle Electric (1915–1916)
- Eagle Rotary (1914–1915; Eagle-Macomber 1916–1918)
- Earl Motors Incorporated (1907–1908)
- Earl (1921–1923)
- Eastman (1898–1900)
- Eastman (1901–1902)
- Eaton Electric (1898–1900)
- Eck
- Eclipse Steam (1900–1903)
- Economy (1916–1919; Economy-Vogue 1920; Vogue 1921–1922)
- Eddy Electric (1900–1901)
- Edsel (1958–1960)
- Edwards-Knight (1912–1913)
- Edwards (1954–1955)
- E.H.V. (see Compound)
- Eichstaedt (1898–1902)
- Eisenhuth (1904–1908)
  'Compound' model
- Elberg
- Elberon (Columbia model)
- Elbert (1914–1915)
- Elcar (1915–1931)
- Elco (1915–1917)
- Eldredge (1903–1906)
- Electra (1914–1915)
- Electric Vehicle Company (1897–1907)
- Electrobat (1894–1897)
- Electronomic
- Elgin (1916–1924)
- Elite
- Elite (1901–1902)
- Elkhart (see Crow-Elkhart or Komet)
- Elliott (1897–1899)
- Ellis
- Ellsworth (1907)
- Elmore (1893–1912)
- El Morocco (1956–1957)
- Emancipator (1909)
- Emerson (1917)
- E-M-F (1909–1912)
  'Wayne' model
- Empire (1901–1902)
- Empire (1910–1919)
- Empire Steam Car (1925–1927)
- Empire Steamer (1899–1902)
- Empire Steamer (1904)
- Endurance Steam Car (1922–1924)
- Enger (1909–1917)
- Engler (W.B.) Cyclecar Company (1914–1915)
- Entz (1914)
- Erie (1899–1902)
- Erskine (1927–1930)
- Eshelman (1953–1961)
- Essex (1906)
- Essex Motor Company (1919–1932)
- Etnyre (1910–1911)
- Euclid (1908)
- Eureka (1900)
- Eureka (1907–1909)
- Evansville
- Everitt (1909–1912)
- Everybody's (1907–1909)
- Ewing (1908–1910)
- Excalibur (1965–1997)
- Excel (1914)

== F ==
- Fageol (1900, 1917)
- Fal-Car (1909–1914)
  Also known as F.A.L.
- Falcon Engineering Company (1907–1909)
- Falcon-Knight (1927–1929)
- Famous (1908–1909)
- Fanning (1901–1903)
- Farmack (1915–1916)
- Farner (1922–1923)
- Faulkner-Blanchard (1910)
- Federal (1907–1909)
- Federal Steam (1901–1902)
- Fenton (1913–1914)
  Unrelated to Fenton Headers
- Ferris (1920–1922)
- Fey Touring (1897–1906)
- Fiberfab (1964–1983)
- Fidelia (1913–1914)
- Field (1886, 1905)
- Fina-Sport (1953–1954)
- Firestone-Columbus (1909–1915)
- Fischer-Detroit (1914)
- Fisher (1901–1905)
- Fisher Body 1908–1984
- Fisker Automotive (2007–2014)
- Fisker Inc. (2016–2024)
- Flagler (1914)
  Based in Michigan
- Flanders 20 (1910–1912)
- Flanders Manufacturing Company (1912–1914)
- Flanders (1913)
  'Flanders Six' model
- Fleetwood Metal Body 1909–1931
- Flexbi (1904)
- Flint (1923–1927)
- Flint Automobile Company (1901–1903)
- Flyer Motor Car Company (1913–1914)
- Forest (1905–1906) Organized in Boston.
- Forest City (1905)
  Manufactured as the Jewell beginning in 1906. Organized in Cleveland, Ohio, & named for the city nickname.
- Forsyth (circa 1896) Franklin, Minnesota; only a prototype built.
- Forth (1905)
  New York company, one of two of the same name, organized by Clarence Forth. No cars built.
- Forth (1910–1911)
  Mansfield, Ohio, company, one of two of the same name, organized by Clarence Forth. Only one prototype car assembled; went bankrupt late 1911.
- Fort Pitt (1908–1910, 1911)
  Organized in New Kensington, Pennsylvania; moved to Pittsburgh 1911. Always known as the Pittsburgh Six
- Foster (1889,1901–1904)
- Fostoria (1906–1907)
- Fournier-Searchmont
- Fox (1921–1923)
- Franklin (1902–1934)
- Frayer-Miller (1904–1910)
- Frazer (1946–1951)
- Frederickson (1914)
- Fredonia (1902–1904)
- Fremont (1920–1922)
- Friedman Automobile Company (1900–1903)
- Friend Motors Corporation (1920–1921)
- Fritchle Electric (1905–1920)
- Frontenac (1906–1913)
- Frontenac Motor Corporation (1921–1925)
- Frontmobile (1917–1918)
- F.R.P. (1914–1916)
- F.S. (1911–1912)
- Fuller (1908–1910)
- F.W.D. (1910–1912)
  Based in Wisconsin

== G ==
- Gabriel (1910–1920) Gabriel Auto Company
- Gadabout (1914–1916)
- Gadabout (1946)
- Gaeth (1902–1911)
- Gage (1914–1915) Union Car Company
- Gale (1905–1907)
- Galloway (1906–1920) William Galloway Company
- Gardner (1920–1931)
- Garford (1908, 1911–1913) Superior Coach Company
- Gary (1909) Gary Taxicab Company
- Gary Automobile Manufacturing Company (1914) Gary Automobile Manufacturing Company
- Gas-au-lec (1905–1906) Corwin Manufacturing Company
- Gaslight (1960–circa 1961)
- Gasmobile (1899–1902)
- Gatsby Coachworks (1979–1998) Gatsby Coachworks
- Gatts (1905) Gatts
- Gaylord Motor Car Company (1911–1913)
- Gaylord Gladiator (1955–1956)
- Gearhart (1911–1912) Southern Motor Sales Company
- Gearless (1906–1909) Gearless Motor Car Company
- Gearless Steamer (1919–1923) Gearless Motor Corporation
- Gem Motor Car Company (1917–1919)
- GEM (1992–2022)
- General (1902–1904)
- General Electric (1891–1898, 1902–1903)
- General Electric (1898–1900)
- General Motors Corporation (1908–2009)
- Geneva (1901–1904)
- German-American (1902–1903)
- Geo (1989–1997)
- Geronimo (1917–1920)
- Ghent (1916–1918)
- Gillette (1916)
- Gillig (1890)
- G.J.G. (1909–1914)
- Glasspar (1949–1953)
- Gleason (1909–1913)
- Glide (1903–1920)
- Globe Four (1921–1922)
- Glover (1920–1921)
- Golden Eagle (1906)
- Graham-Paige (1928–1930; Graham 1930–1941)
- Gramm (1902)
- Granite Falls
- Grant (1913–1922)
- Graves & Condon (1908–1910))
- Gray Motor Corporation (1922–1926)
- Gray Light Car (1920)
- Great Eagle (1910–1915)
- Great Southern (1910–1914)
- Great Western (1910–1916)
- Greenleaf Cycle Company (1902)
- GreenTech Automotive (2009–2018)
- Gregory (1920–1922)
- Greyhound (1914–1916)
- Grinnell Electric Car Company (1910–1915)
- Griswold Motor Car Company (1907)
- Grout (1900–1912)
- Gurley (1899–1901)
- G.V (1907)
- Gyroscope (1908–1909)

== H ==
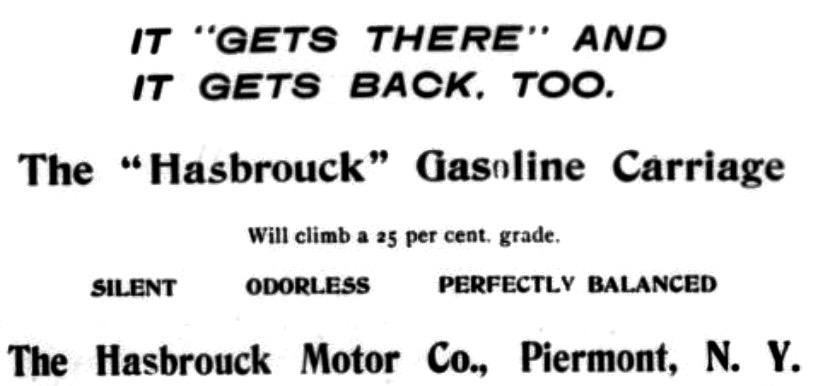
Hasbrouck advertisement (1901)

- Haase (1902–1904)
- Hackett Motor Car Company (1916–1919)
- H.A.L. (1916–1918)
- Hall (1903–1904) Hall Motor Vehicle Company
- Hall (1914–1915)
- Halladay (1905–1922)
- Hamilton (1917)
- Hamlin-Holmes (1919–1929; Hamlin 1930)
- Hammer-Sommer (1902–1906)
  Renamed to Hammer Motor Company for 1905–1906
- Handley Motors Incorporated (1921–1923; Handley 1923)
- Hanger (1916)
- Hanover (1921–1927)
- Hanson (1918–1925)
- Harding (1916–1917)
- Hardy
- Harper (1907–1908)
- Harrie (1925)
- Harris (1910)
- Harrison Wagon Company (1905–1907; Harrison Motor Car Company 1907)
- Harroun Motor Sales Corporation (1917–1922)
- Harry S. Houpt Manufacturing Company: (See Houpt (1909); The "New Departure Manufacturing Company" (Bristol, Connecticut) forming of Houpt-Rockwell in 1910) Covered in the German Wikipedia
- Hartley (1895–1899)
- Hartman (1914–1918)
- Harvard (1915–1921)
- Harwood-Barley (1911–1915)
- Hasbrouck (1900–1902) Hasbrouck Motor Works
- Hatfield (1907–1908)
- Hatfield (1916–1924)
- Havers Motor Car Company (1908–1914)
- Hawk Cyclecar Company (1914)
- Hawkins Cyclecar (1914)
  Xenia model
- Hawley (1906–1908)
- Hay-Berg (1907–1908)
- Haydock
- Haynes-Apperson (1896–1905; Haynes 1904–1925)
- Hayward (1913)
- H.C.S. (1920–1925)
- Healey (circa 1905–circa 1916)
- Heine-Velox (1903–1908, 1921–1923)
- Hendel (1903–1904)
- Henderson (1912–1914)
- Henney (1921–1931)
- Henney (1960–1964)
- Henry Motor Car Company (1910–1912)
- Hercules (1914–1915)
- Herff-Brooks (1915–1916)
- Herreshoff Motor Company (1909–1914)
- Hertel (1895–1900)
- Hertz (1924–1927)
- Heseltine (1916–1917)
- Hewitt (1906–1907)
- Hewitt (1905–1914)
- Hewitt-Lindstrom (1900–1901)
- Heymann (1898–1907)
- Hidley Steam Car (1901)
- Highlander (1919–1922)
- Hill (1904–1908)
- Hines (1908–1910)
- Hitchcock Motor Car Company (1909)
- Hobbie Accessible (1908–1909)
- Hoffman (1901–1904)
- Hoffman (1931)
- Holden (1915)
- Holland (1902–1903)
- Holley (1900–1904)
- Hollier (1915–1921)
- Holly Six (1913–1915)
- Holmes (1906–1907)
- Holsman (1901–1911)
- Hol-Tan (1908)
- Holyoke (1899–1903)
- Homer Laughlin (1916)
- Hoosier Scout (1914)
- Hoover (1913–1914)
- Hoskins (1920)
- Houpt (1909; Houpt-Rockwell 1910)
- House Steamer (1867)
- Howard (1895–1903)
- Howey (1907–1908)
- Hudson Motor Car Company (1909–1957)
- Huffman (1919–1925)
- Hupp Motor Car Company (1909–1940)
- Hupp-Yeats Electric Car Company (1911–1919)
- Huron River Manufacturing Company (1911–1912)
- Hydromotor Car Manufacturing Company (1914–1917)

== I ==
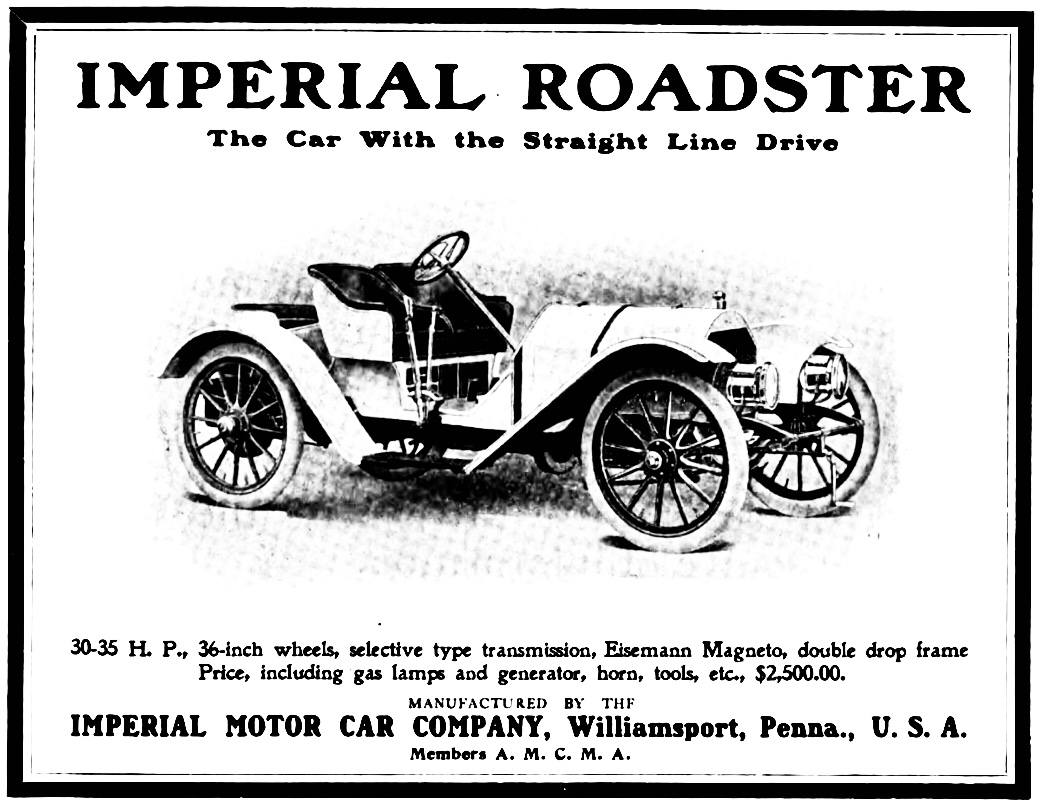
Imperial Motor Car Company Roadster (1908)

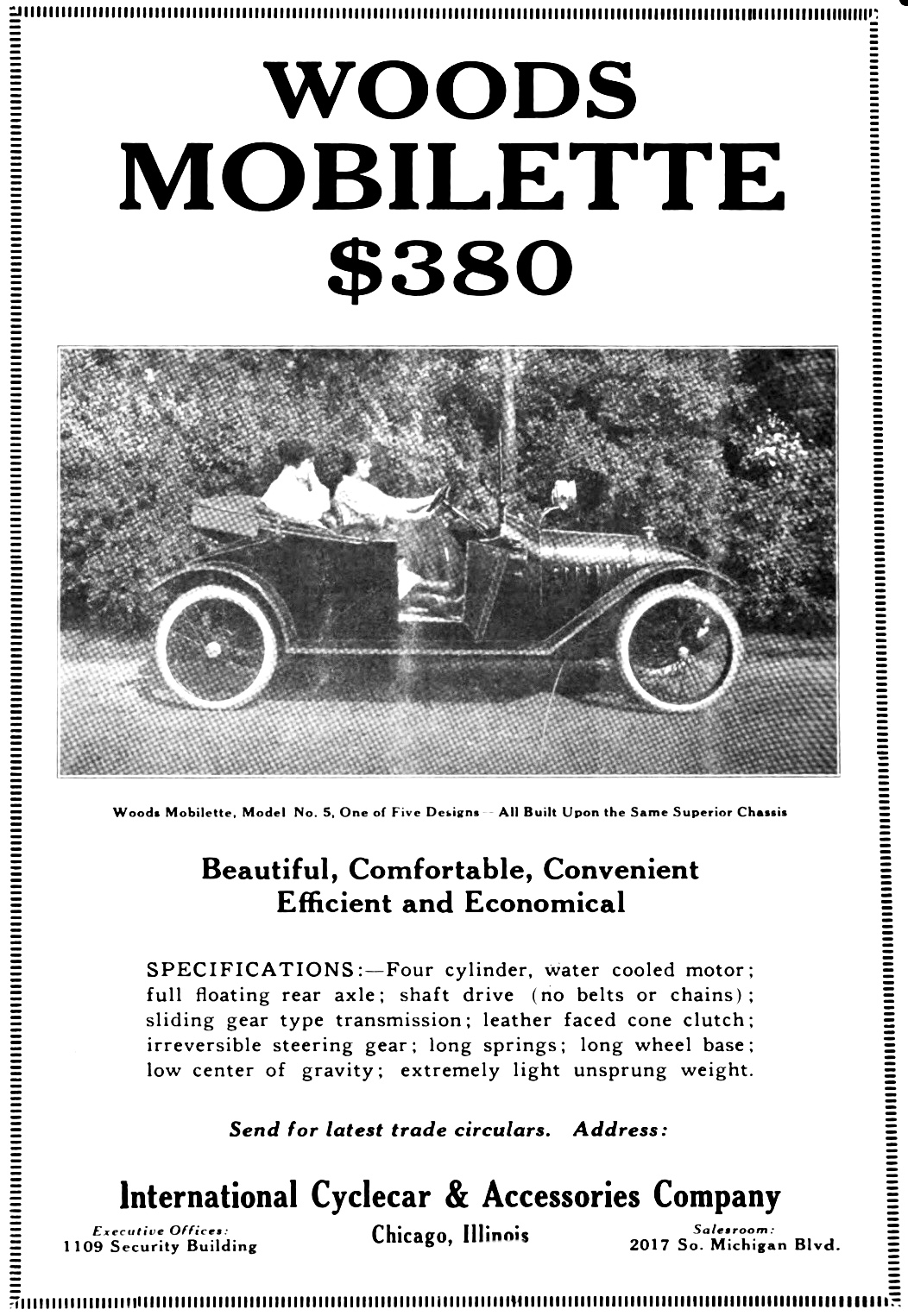
International Cyclecar Company Woods Mobilette (1915)

- Ideal Electric Co. (1909-c1911)
- Illinois Electric (1897–1901)
- Imp (1913–1914)
- Imperial Motor Car Company (1907–1908)
- Imperial Automobile Company (1908–1916)
- Imperial (1955–1975, 1981–1983)
- Imperial Electric (1903–1904)
- Independent Harvester (1910–1911)
- Indiana (1901)
- Indianapolis (see Black)
- International (1899) (see Strathmore)
- International (1899)
- International (1900)
- International Cyclecar Company (1914)
  'Economy' model
- International Motor Cars (Apollo; 1962–1964)
- International Power Company (1900)
- International (1901–1903)
- International Cyclecar Company (1914)
- International Harvester (1907–1980)
- Inter-State (1909–1919)
- Iroquois (1903–1907)

== J ==
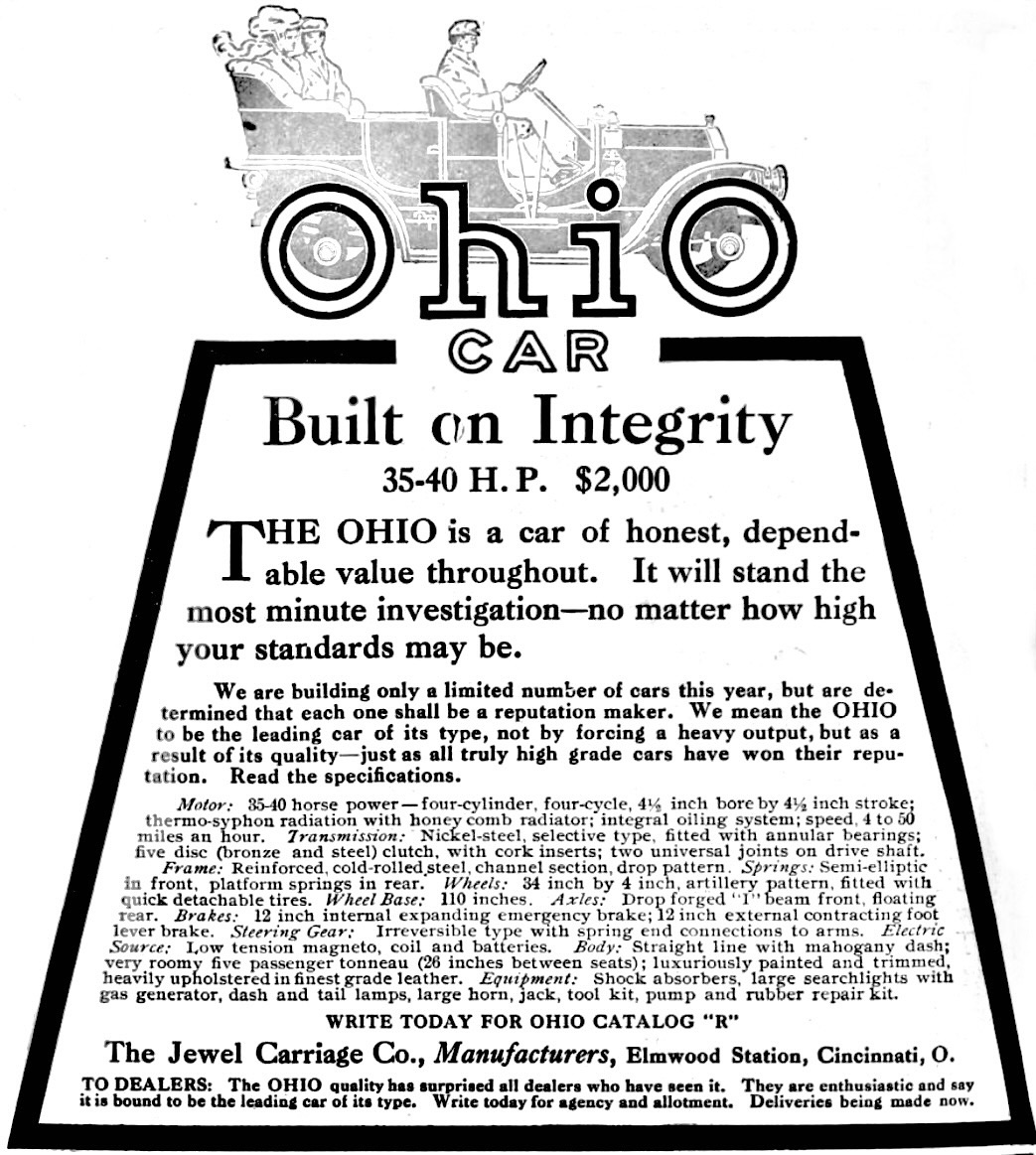
Jewel Carriage Company (1909) Ohio

- Jackson Automobile Company (1903–1923)
- Jacquet Motor Corporation (1921)
- Jaeger Motor Car Company (1932–1933)
- James (1909–1911)
- Janney Motor Company (1906)
- Jarvis-Huntington (1912)
- Jaxon Steam (1903)
- Jeffery (1915–1917)
- Jenkins (1907–1912)
- Jersey City Machine Co. (1919–1920)
  Argonne model
- Jewell (1906–1907; Jewel 1908–1909)
- Jewel Carriage Company (1909)
- Jewett (1922–1927)
- Johnson (1905–1912)
- Jones (1914–1920)
- Jones-Corbin (1903–1907)
- Jonz (1909–1912)
- Jordan (1916–1931)
- J.P.L. Cyclecar Company (1913)
- Julian (1918, 1925)
- Junior R (1924)

== K ==
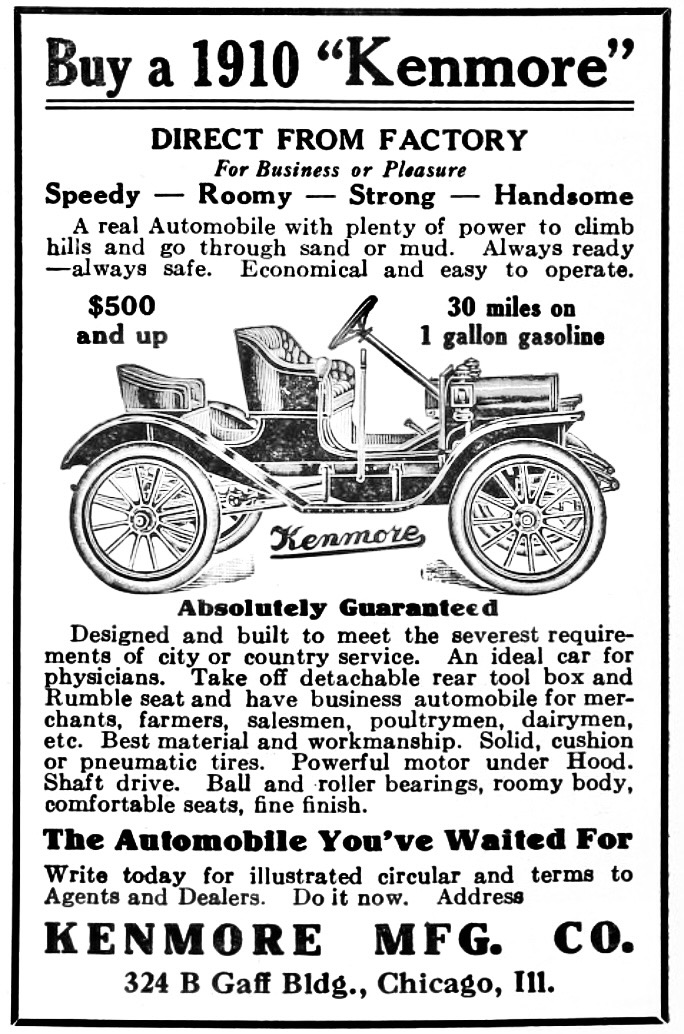
Kenmore advertisement (1910)

- Kaiser-Frazer Corporation (1945–1955; Kaiser Motors 1951–1955)
- Kalamazoo (1908–1914)
  Michigan model
- Kane-Pennington
- Kansas City (1906–1908; Kansas City Wonder 1909)
- Kato (1907–1913)
- Kauffman (1909–1912)
- K-D (1912–1913)
- Kearns (1909–1916)
- Keene Steamobile (1900–1901)
- Keeton Motor Company (1912–1914)
- Keller (1948–1950)
- Kelsey (1897–1902, 1920–1924)
- Kenmore (1910–1912)
- Kensington (1899–1904)
- Kent (1916–1917)
- Kent's Pacemaker (1900)
- Kenworthy (1920–1921)
- Kermath Motor Car Company (1907–1908)
- Kessler Motor Company (1920–1921; Kess-Line 8 1922)
- Keystone (1899–1900)
- Keystone (1900)
- Keystone (1914–1915)
- Kiblinger (1907–1909)
- Kidder (1899–1903)
- Kimball Electric (1910–1912)
- King (1896, 1911–1923)
- King Midget (1947–1970)
- King-Remick (1910)
- Kinner
- Kirk (1901–1905)
  Yale model
- Kissel (1906–1930)
- Kleiber (1924–1929)
- Kline Kar (1910–1923)
- Klink (1907–1910)
- Klock (1900–1901)
- Knickerbocker (1901–1903)
- Knox (1900–1914)
- Koehler (1910–1912)
- Komet (1911)
- Konigslow
- Koppin Motor Company (1914)
- Krastin Automobile Company (1901–1904), based in Cleveland Produced Krastin Gasoline Automobile (1901)
- K-R-I-T Motor Car Company (1909–1915)
- Krueger (1905–1906)
- Kunz (1902–1905)
- Kurtis (1949–1950, 1954–1955)
- Kurtz-Automatic (1920–1925)

== L ==
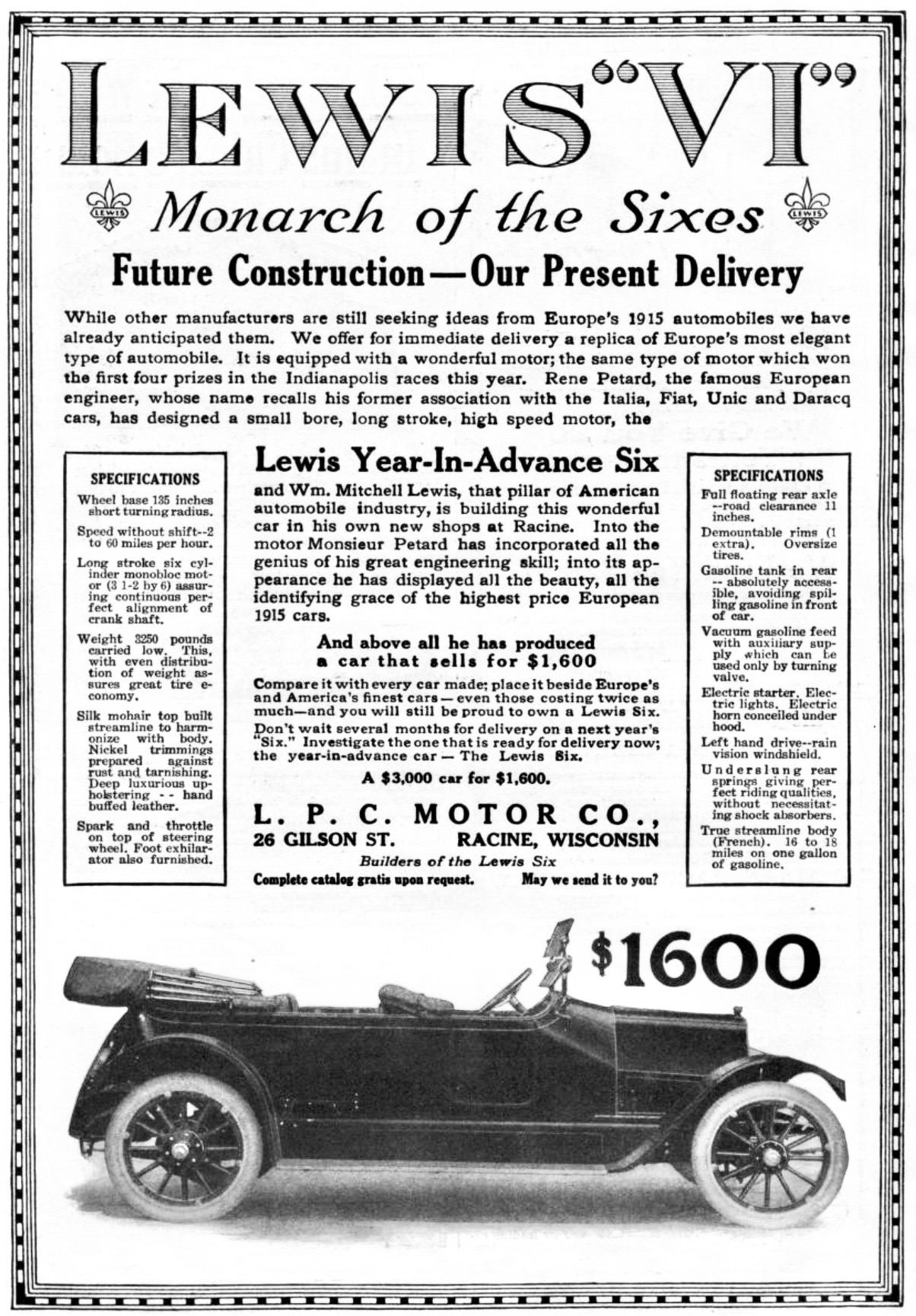
Lewis VI (1914–1916)

- Laconia (1914)
- Lad's Car (1912–1914)
- LaFayette (1919–1924)
- La Marne (1919–1921)
- Lambert (1906–1917)
- Lancamobile (1900–1901)
- Lane (1900–1911)
- Lanpher (1906–1916)
- Lansden Electric (1901–1903, 1906–1910)
- La Petite (1905)
- LaSalle (1927–1940)
- La Salle-Niagara (1905–1906)
- Laurel (1916–1920)
- Lauth (1905; Lauth-Juergens 1908–1909)
- L. C. Erbes (1915–1916)
- L & E (1924–1934)
- Leach (1899–1901)
- Leach (1920–1923; Leach-Biltwell))
- Leader (1905–1912)
- LeBaron Incorporated (1924–1953)
- Lende (1902–1909)
- Lenox (1911–1917)
- Lenox Electric
- Leon Rubay (1923)
- Lescina (1916)
- Lewis (1914–1916)
- Lewis Motocycle (1895)
- Lexington (1909–1927)
- Liberty Motor Car Company (1916–1924)
- Light Steamer (1901–1902)
- Light Motor Car Company (1914)
- Lincoln (1912–1913) (see also Sears Roebuck)
- Lincoln Motor Car Company (1914)
- Lindsley (1908–1909)
- Lion Motor Car Company (1909–1912)
- Liquid Air (1899–1902)
- Little Motor Car Company (1911–1913)
- Little Detroit Speedster (1913–1914)
- Littlemac (1930–1932)
- Local Motors (2007–2022)
- Locke
- Locomobile (1899–1929)
- Logan (1904–1908)
- Logan (1903–1908)
- Logan (cyclecars; 1914)
- Lone Star (1919–1922)
- Longest (1906)
- Loomis (1900–1904)
- Lordstown Motors (2018–2023)
- Lorraine (1920–1922)
- Los Angeles (1914)
- Lowell-American (1908–1909)
- Lozier Motor Company (1900–1918)
- L.P.C.
- LuLu (1914–1915)
- Luverne (1904–1917)
- Lyman (1904)
- Lyman & Burnham (1903–1905)
- Lyons-Knight (1913–1915)

== M ==
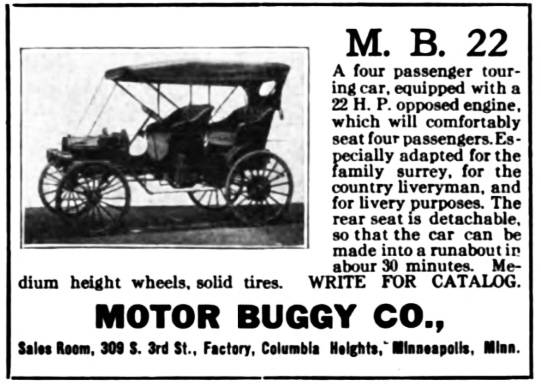
Motor Buggy Co. (1908–1911)

- Mackle-Thompson (1903)
- Macomber (1913)
- Macon (1915–1917)
- Madison (1915–1919)
- Magic
- Mahoning (1904–1905)
- Maibohm (1916–1922)
- Malcolm (1900)
- Malcolm Jones (or Malcolm) (1914–1915)
- Malden Steam (1898, 1902)
- Manexall (1920)
  'Cyclomobile' model
- Manistee Motor Car Company (1910–1913)
  Autoette model
- Manta (1974–1986)
- Marathon (1906–1914)
- Marble-Swift (1903–1905)
- Marion (1901)
- Marion (1904–1915)
- Marion Flyer (1910)
- Marmon (1902–1933)
- Marlboro (1900–1903)
- Marquette (1912)
- Marquette (1930)
- Marr (1903–1904)
- Marsh (1920–1923)
- Martin (1898–1900)
- Martin Wasp (1919–1925)
- Marvel Motor Car Company (1907)
- Maryland (1907–1910)
- Maryland Steamer (1900–1901)
- Mason (1898–1899)
- Mason (1906–1914)
- Massillon (1909)
- Master (1907)
- Matheson Motor Car Company (1903–1912)
- Maxim Motor Tricycle (1895; Maxim-Goodridge Electric 1908)
- Maxwell-Briscoe (1904–1913; Maxwell Motor Company 1913–1925)
- Mayer (1899–1901)
- Mayfair (1925)
- Maytag-Mason (1910–1911)
- McCue (1909–1911)
- McCurdy (1922)
- McFarlan (1909–1928)
- McGill (1917)
- McIntyre (1909–1915)
- McKay Steamer (1899–1902)
- Mecca (1915–1916)
- Med-Bow
- Media (1899–1900)
- Mel Special (1918–1924)
- Menominee Electric Manufacturing Company (1915)
- Mercer (1909–1919)
- Mercury Cyclecar Company (1913–1914)
- Mercury (1939–2011)
- Merit Motor Company (1921–1922)
- Merkel (1905–1907)
- Merkur (1985–1989)
- Merz (1914)
- Meteor (1904–1905)
- Metropol (1913–1914)
- Metropolitan (1922–1923)
- Metz (1909–1921)
- Metzger (see Everitt)
- Michigan Automobile Company (1901)
  'Carter Steam' model
- Michigan Automobile Company (1902) Later renamed Clipper Automobile Company
- Michigan Automobile Company (1903–1908)
- Michigan Buggy Company (1908–1914)
- Michigan Steamer (1901)
- Michigan Yacht and Power Co. (1904– ?)
- Middleby (1909–1913)
- Midland (1908–1913)
- Midwest
- Mier (1908–1909)
- Milac (1916)
- Milburn Electric (1915–1923)
- Miller Car Company (1911–1914)
- Mills (1876)
- Milwaukee Steamer (1900–1902)
- Minneapolis
- Mino (1914)
- Mitchell (1903–1923)
- Mitchell-Lewis (see Mitchell)
- Mobile (1900–1903)
- Model (1903–1907)
- Modoc (1912–1914)
- Mohawk (1903–1905)
- Moline
- Moline (1904–1913; Moline-Knight 1914–1919)
- Moller (1920–1922)
- Monarch Motor Car Company (1914–1917)
- Mondex-Magic (1914–1915)
- Monitor (1915–1922)
- Monroe Motor Company (1914–1923)
- Moon (1905–1930)
- Mora Motor Car Company (1906–1911)
- Morgan (1900–1902)
- Morris & Salom (1895–1897)
- Morriss-London (1919–1923)
- Morse (1902)
- Mosler Automotive (1985–2013)
- Motor Bob (1914)
- Motor Buggy (1908–1911)
- Motorcar Company (1905–1907; Cartercar 1905–1915)
- Motorette (1911–1914)
- Moyea (1903–1904)
- Moyer (1911–1915)
- Mount Pleasant Motor Company (MPM) (1914–1915)
- Mutual Motors Company (1916–1919)
- Mueller (1896–1899; also Mueller-Benz) (see Mueller Co., which was founded by the same person)
- Mueller Manufacturing Company (1893–1952)
- Multiplex (1912–1913)
- Muncie
  'Warner' model
- Muntz (1950–1954)
- Murdaugh (1901–1903)
- Murray Corporation (1925–1939)
- Murray Motor Car Company (1916–1921; Murray-Mac 1921–1929)

== N ==
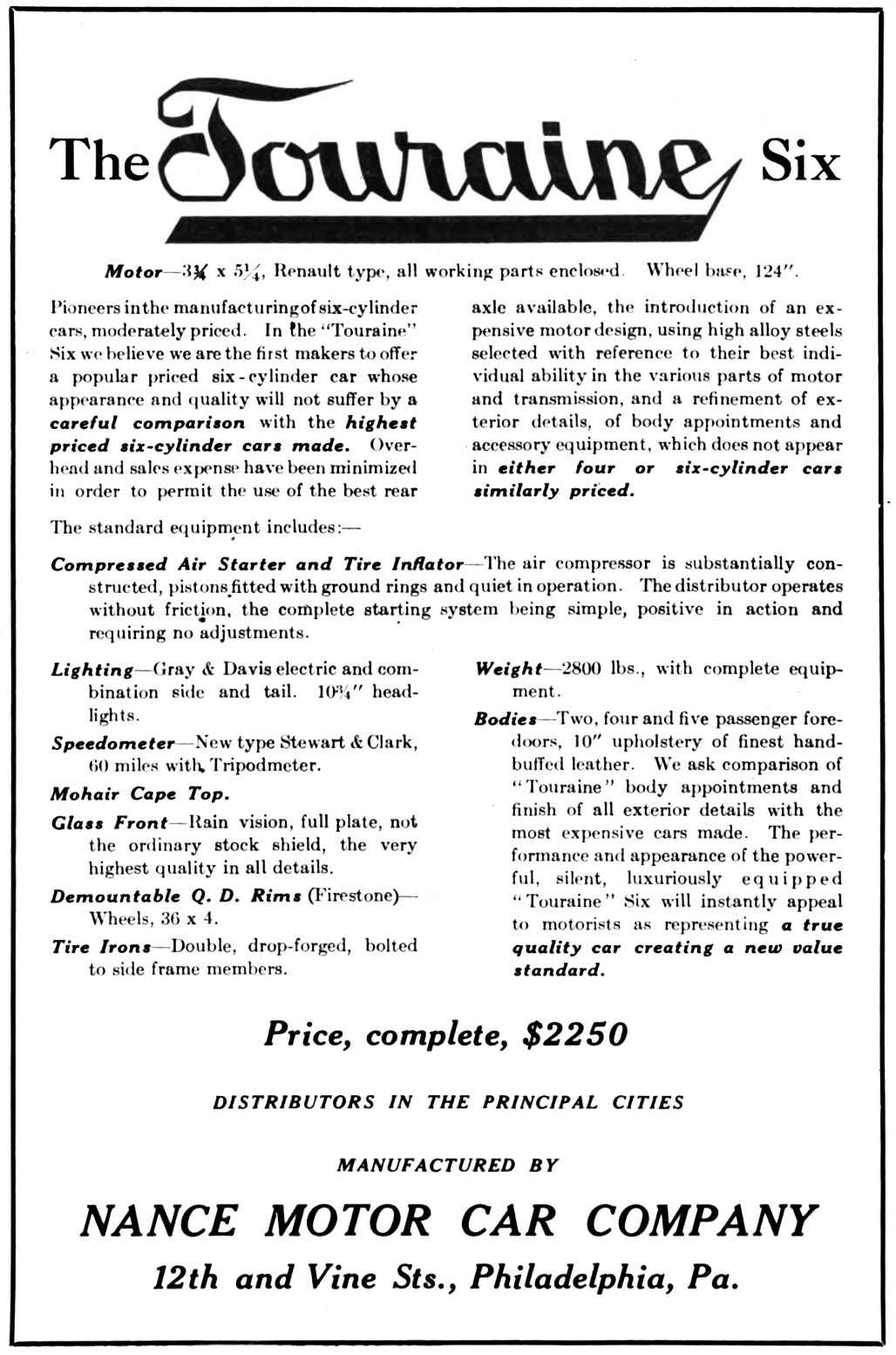
Nance advertisement (1912)

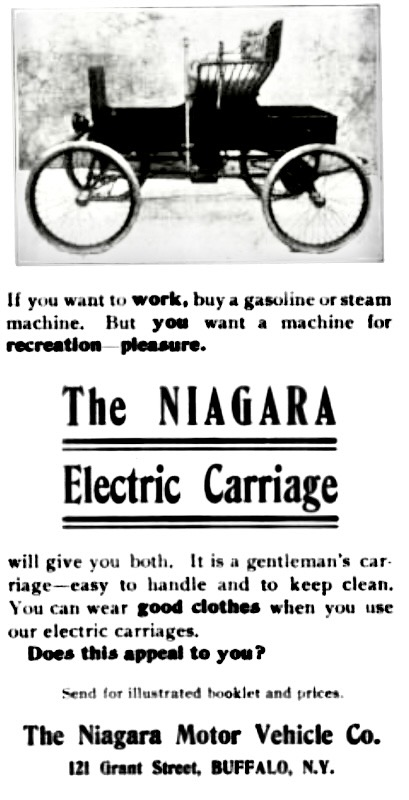
Niagara Motor Vehicle Company advertisement (1902)

- Nance (1910–1912) Nance Motor Car Company
- Napier Motor Car Company of America (1904–1912)
- Napoleon (1916–1919)
- Nash Motors (1917–1957)
- National (1900–1924)
- Nelson (E.A.) Motor Car Company (1917–1921)
- Neustadt-Perry (1901–1908, 1915)
  Also known as Neustadt.
- New England Steamer (1898–1899)
- New Era (1901–1902)
- New Era (1916–1924)
- New Era (1933–1934)
- New Home (1899–1901)
- New York Car & Truck Company (1907–1910)
  Allen Kingston model
- Niagara (1903–1905)
- Niagara Automobile Company (1915–1916)
- Niagara Motor Car Company (1912–1914)
- Niagara Motor Bob Company (1911–1915)
- Niagara Motor Vehicle Company (1902)
- Nichols Shepard (1910–1911)
- Nielson Motor Car Company (1906–1907)
- Noble (1902)
- Noma (1919–1923)
- Northern Manufacturing Company (1902–1908)
- Northway (1921–1922)
- Northwestern
  'Haase' and Logan models
- Norton (1901–1902)
- Norwalk Underslung (1910–1922)
- Nu-Klea Automobile Corporation (1959–1960)
- Nyberg (1911–1913)

== O ==
- Oakland Motor Car Company (1907–1931)
- Oakman-Hertel (1899–1900)
- Ogren (1915–1917, 1919–1923)
- Ohio (1900–1902) (see Packard)
- Ohio (1909–1912)
- Ohio Electric Car Company (1910–1918)
- Ohio Falls
- Okey (1896–1907)
- Oldsmobile (1897–2004)
- Olympian Motors Company (1917–1921)
- Omaha (1899)
- Omar (see Browniekar)
- Only (1909–1913)
- Orient (1899–1908)
- Orlo (1904)
- Ormond Steamer (1904–1905)
- Orr (1915)
- Orson (1910–1912)
- Otto (1910–1911; Ottomobile 1912)
- Otto-Kar (1902–1904)
  Also known as Ottokar
- Otto-mobile (1899)
- Overholt
- Overland (1903–1926, 1939)
- O-We-Go (1914)
- Owen (1899–1901)
- Owen Motor Car Company (1910–1911)
- Owen Magnetic (1915–1922)
- Owen Schoeneck
- Owen Thomas (1908–1910)
- Oxford (1900)

== P ==
- Paccar (1905)
- Pacific Motor Vehicle Company (1900–1904)
- Packard (1895–1898)
- Packard Motor Car Company (1899–1958)
- Paige-Detroit (1908–1911; Paige 1911–1928; Graham-Paige 1928–1930)
- Palmer (1905–1906)
- Palmer-Singer (1908–1914)
- Pan (1919–1921)
- Panam (1902–1903)
- Pan-American (1917–1922)
- Paragon (1906)
- Parenti (1920–1922)
- Parry (1910; New Parry 1911–1912)
- Parsons Electric (1905–1906)
- Partin (1913; Partin-Palmer 1913–1917)
- Paterson (W. A.) Company (1909–1923)
- Pathfinder (1912–1917)
- Pawtucket (1901–1902)
- Payne-Modern (1907–1908)
- Peerless (1900–1933)
- Peerless Steam (1901)
- Pence Automobile Company (circa 1905)
- Penn (1901)
- Penn (1908)
- Penn (1910–1913)
- Pennant (1924–1925)
- Pennington (1894–1900)
- Pennsy (1916–1918)
- Pennsylvania (1907–1911)
- People's (1900–1902)
- Perfection (1907–1908)
- Perfex (1912–1913)
- Peter Pan (1914–1915)
- Petrel (1909–1912) Petrel Motor Car Company
- Phelps (1903–1905)
- Phianna (1917–1922)
- Philadelphia Motor Vehicle Company (1900–1901)
- Phillips (1980–198?)
- Phipps-Grinnell (1911; Phipps Electric 1912)
- Pickard (1909–1912)
- Piedmont (1917–1922)
- Pierce-Arrow (1900–1938)
- Pierce-Racine (1904–1911)
- Piggins (1908–1910)
- Pilgrim (1911)
- Pilgrim Motor Car Company (1915–1918)
- Pilliod (1915–1916)
- Pilot (1909–1924)
- Pioneer (1907–1912)
- Planche
- Plass (1897)
- Playboy (1947–1951)
- Plymouth (1910)
- Plymouth (1928–2001)
- Pneumobile (1914–1915)
- Pomeroy (1920–1924)
- Ponder (1923)
  Renamed from Bour-Davis
- Pontiac Chassis Company (1915–1916)
- Pontiac Spring and Wagon Works (1907–1908) became Cartercar
- Pontiac (1926–2010)
- Pope-Hartford (1904–1914)
- Pope-Robinson (1903–1904)
- Pope-Toledo (1903–1909)
- Pope-Tribune (1904–1908)
- Pope-Waverley (1903–1908)
- Port Huron
  Havers model
- Porter (1900–1901)
- Porter (1919–1922)
- Portland (1914)
- Postal (1906–1908)
- Powell (1930s–1960s)
- Powell (1955–1956)
- Powercar (1909–1911)
- Pratt-Elkhart (1909–1911; Pratt 1911–1915)
- Premier (1902–1926)
- Premocar (1920–1923)
- Prescott (1901–1905)
- Primo (1910–1912)
- Princess Motor Car Company (1914–1918)
- Princess Cyclecar Company (1913–1914)
- Prospect (1902, 1907–1908)
- Pullman (1905–1917)
- Pungs Finch (1904–1910)
- Puritan (1902–1905)

== Q ==
- Queen (1904–1907)
- Quick (1899–1900)
- Quinby (1899)

== R ==
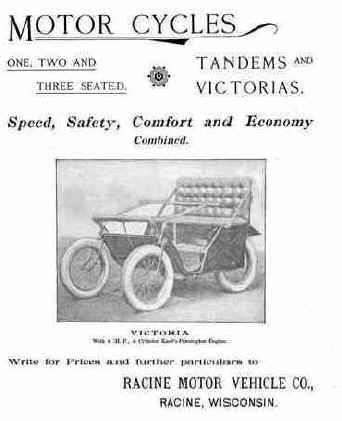
Racine Victoria (1895)

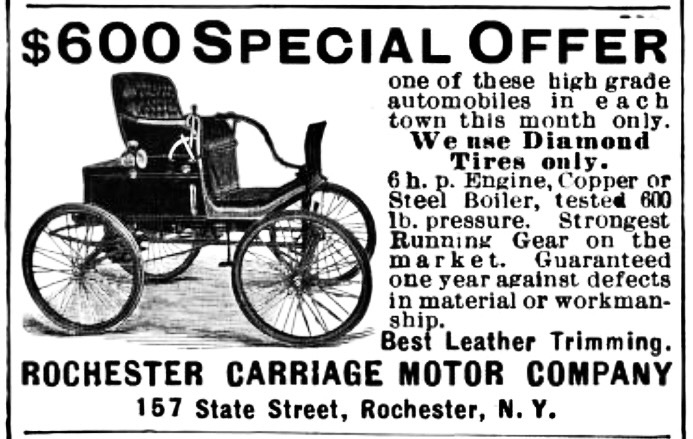
Rochester Gasoline Carriage & Motor Company (1902) advertisement

- Racine Motor Vehicle Company (1895–1896) Racine Motor Vehicle Company
- Railsbach (1914)
- Rainier (1905–1911)
- Raleigh (1921–1922)
- Rambler (1900–1914)
- Rambler (1958–1969)
- Randall (1902–1903)
- Ranger (1907–1910)
- Rapid Motor Vehicle Company (1902–1909)
- Rauch & Lang (1905–1932)
  Also known as Raulang.
- Rayfield (1911–1915)
- R.C.H (1912–1915)
- Read Motor Company (1913–1914)
- Reading (1910–1913)
- Reading Steamer (1901–1903)
- Real Cyclecar (1914; Real Light Car 1914–1915)
- Reber (1902–1903)
- Red Bug (1924–1930)
- Red Jacket (1904–1905)
- Rees (1921)
- Reeves (1896–1898, 1905–1912)
- Regal Motor Car Company (1908–1918)
- Regas (1903–1905)
- Reliable Dayton (1906–1909)
- Reliance Automobile Manufacturing Co (1904–1906)
- Remington (1895, 1900–1904)
- REO Motor Car Company (1905–1975)
- Renaissance Cars Inc (1994–1997)
  Also known as Zebra Motors Inc.
- Republic (1910–1916)
- ReVere (1918–1926)
- Rex Motor Co (1914)
- RiChard (1914–1919)
- Richelieu (1922–1923)
- Richmond (1902–1903)
- Richmond (1904–1917)
- Rickenbacker Motor Company (1922–1927)
- Ricketts Automobile Co (1909–1911)
- Riddle (1916–1926)
- Rider-Lewis (1908–1911)
- Riker Electric (1897–1902)
- Ritz (1914–1915)
- Riviera (1907)
- R-O
- Roader (1911–1912)
- Roamer (1916–1929)
- Robe (1914–1915)
- Robie Motor Car Co (1914)
- Robinson (1900–1902)
- Robson (1909)
- Rochester (1901)
- Rock Falls (1919–1925)
- Rockne (1932–1933)
- Rockway (1910–1911)
- Rockwell (1910–1911)
- Rodgers (1921)
- Roebling-Planche (1909)
- Rogers (1899–1900)
  Steamobile model
- Rogers Motor Car Co (1911–1912)
- Rogers & Hanford (1899–1902)
- Rollin (1924–1927)
- Rolls-Royce (1921–1935)
- Roosevelt (1929–1930)
- Roper (1860–1896)
- Ross Steamer (1905–1909)
- Ross (1915–1918)
- Rotary (1921–1923)
- Royal Motor Company (1904–1911)
  'Tourist' model
- Rubay
- Rugby (1920s)
- Rushmobile
- Russell (1903–1904)
- Rutenber (1902)
- Ruxton (1929–1930)
- R&V Knight (1920–1924)

== S ==
Scott advertisement (1901)

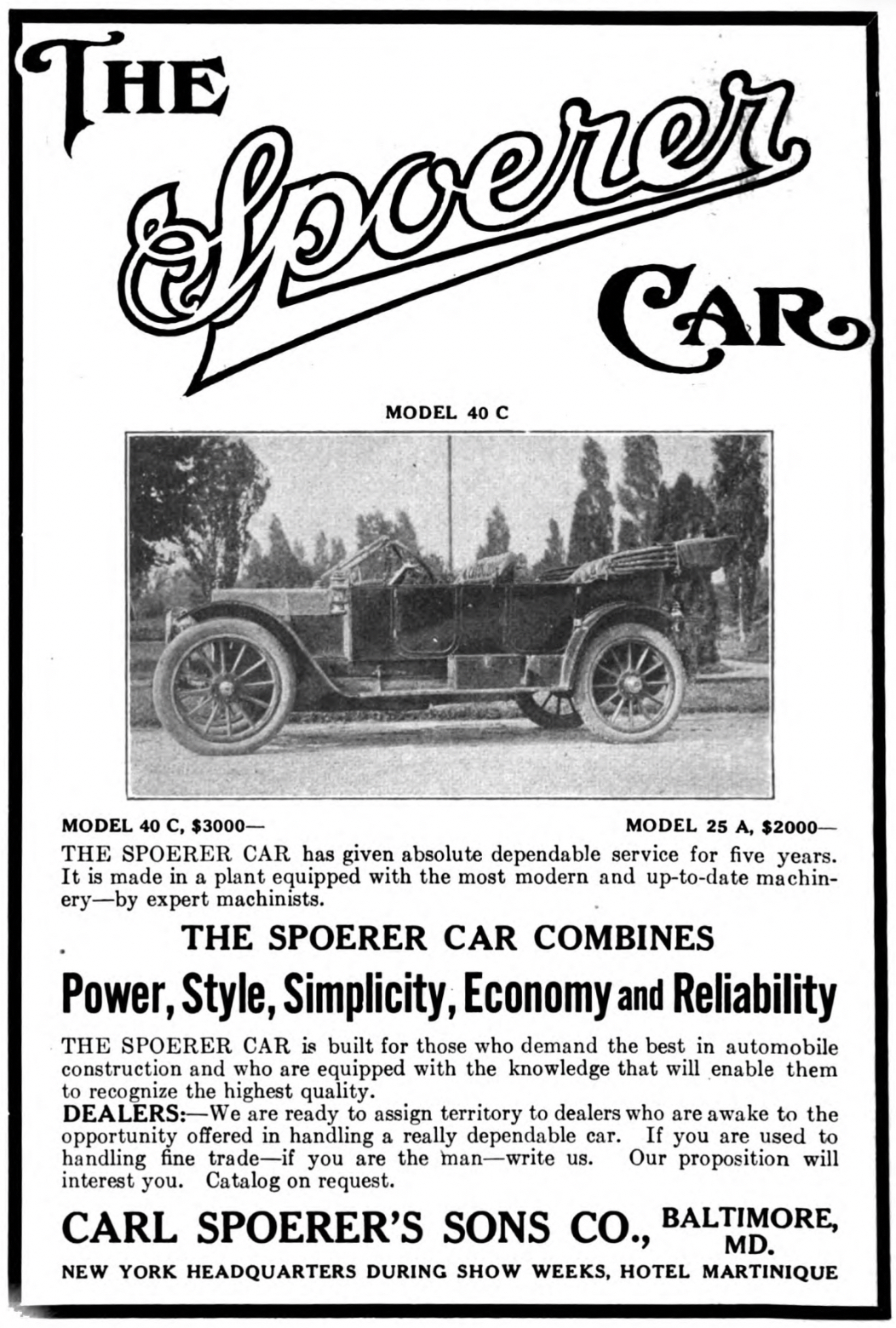
Spoerer advertisement (1912)

S & M Model 6-48 (1913)

- Saginaw (1914)
- Saginaw Eight (1916)
- Salisbury (1895)
- Salter (1909–1915)
- Salvador (1914; S-J-R 1915–1916)
- Sampson (1904, 1911)
- Sandusky (1902–1904)
- Santos Dumont (1902–1904)
- Saturn (1991–2010)
- Saxon Motor Car Company (1913–1923)
- Sayers (1917–1924)
- Schacht (1904–1913)
- Schaum (1901–1905)
- Schoening (1895)
  'Kerosine Carriage' model
- Scott (1900–1901, 1903)
- Scott-Newcomb (1920–1921)
  Standard Steam Car model
- Scripps-Booth Corporation (1913–1923)
- Searchmont (1900–1903)
- Sears (1905–1915)
- Sebring (1910–1912)
- Sekine (1923)
- Selden (1907–1914)
- Sellers (1909–1912)
- Senator (1912)
- Seneca (1917–1924)
- Serpentina (1915)
- Serrifile (1921–1922)
- Seven Little Buffaloes (1909)
- Severin (1920–1921)
- S.G.V. (1911–1915)
- Shad-Wyck (1917–1923)
- Shain
- Sharon (1915)
- Sharp (1908–1910)
  'Arrow' model
- Shawmobile (1908–1930)
- Shawmut (1906–1908)
- Shay (1979–1982)
- Shelby (1903)
- Sheridan (1920–1921)
- Shoemaker (1906–1908)
- Sibley (1910–1911)
- Signet (1913–1914) 'Fenton' model
- Silent-Knight (1905–1907)
- Silent Sioux
  'Fawick Flyer' model
- Silver-Knight
  'Silver' model
- Simplex (1907–1919)
- Simplicity (1907–1911)
- Simplo (1908–1909)
- Sinclair-Scott (1904–circa 1907)
- Singer (1914–1920)
- Single Center (1906–1908)
- Sintz (1899–1904)
- Skelton (1920–1922)
- Skene (1900–1901)
- Skorpion (1952–1954)
- S & M Motor Company (1913)
- Small Motor Car Company (1910)
- Smith Automobile Company (1902–1917)
  Renamed to Great Smith for 1907–1911
- Smith & Mabley
  Also known as S&M Simplex
- Smith Flyer (1915–1919)
- Snyder (1908–1909)
- Sommer (1904–1905)
- Soules Motor Car Company (1905–1908)
- Southern (1908–1909)
- Southern Motor Car Co (1908–1910)
  'Dixie Junior' and 'Dixie Tourist' models.
- Sovereign (1906–1907)
- Spacke (1919)
- Spaulding (1902–1903)
- Spaulding (1910–1916)
- Speedway (1904–1905)
- Speedwell (1907–1914)
- Spencer (1921–1922)
- Spencer Steamer (1862, 1901–1902)
- Sphinx (1914–1916)
- Spoerer (1908–1914)
- Springer (1903–1905)
- Springfield (1900–1901)
  Steam cars
- Springfield (1903–1905)
- Sprite (1914)
- Squier (1899)
- Stafford (1908–1915)
- Stammobile (1900–1901)
- Standard (1904–1908)
- Standard (1912–1923)
- Standard Six (1909–1910)
- Standard Steel Car Company (1912–1923)
- Standard Electrique (1911–1915)
  Also known as Standard Electric
- Standard Steam Car (1920–1921)
- Stanley (1907–1910)
- Stanley Steamer (1897–1927)
- Stanley Whitney (1899)
- Stanton (1900–1901)
- Stanwood (1920–1922)
- Star (1908–1909)
- Star (1922–1928)
- Starin (1903–1904)
- States (1916–1918)
- Staver (1907–1914)
- Steamobile (1900–1902)
- Stearns (1898–1911)
  Became Stearns-Knight for 1912–1929.
- Stearns Electric (1899–1903)
  Renamed to Stearns Steamer for 1901–1903
- Steco (1914)
- Steel Swallow (1907–1908)
- Stephens (1917–1924)
- Sterling Steamer (1901–1902)
- Sterling (1909–1911)
- Sterling (1915–1916)
- Sterling-Knight (1920–1926)
- Stevens-Duryea (1901–1915,1919–1927)
- Stewart-Coats (1922)
- Stickney Motorette (1914)
- Stilson (1907–1909)
- St. Joe (1908)
- St. Louis (1899–1907)
- Stoddard-Dayton (1904–1913)
- Storck Steamer (1901–1902)
- Storms Electric (1915)
- Stout Motor Car Company (1932–1946)
- Strathmore (1899–1901)
- Stratton (1909)
- Streator (1905–1911)
  Originally called Erie Motor Carriage Co.
  Halladay model.
- Stringer (1899–1902)
- Strobel & Martin
- Strong & Rogers Electric (1900–1901)
- Strouse
  Also known as S.R.K.
- Studebaker (1902–1963)
- Studebaker-Garford (1903–1911)
- Studebaker-Packard Corporation (1954–1962)
- Studillac (1953–1955)
- Sturges Electric
- Sturtevant (1905–1907)
- Stutz Motor Car Company (1911–1935)
- Stutz Motor Car of America (1968–1987)
- Stuyvesant (1911–1912)
- Suburban (1911–1912)
- Success (1906–1909)
- Sultan (1908–1912)
- Summit (1907–1909)
- Sun (1916–1917, 1921–1922)
- Sunset (1900–1913)
- Synnestvedt Electric (1904–1905)
- Syracuse (1899–1903)

== T ==
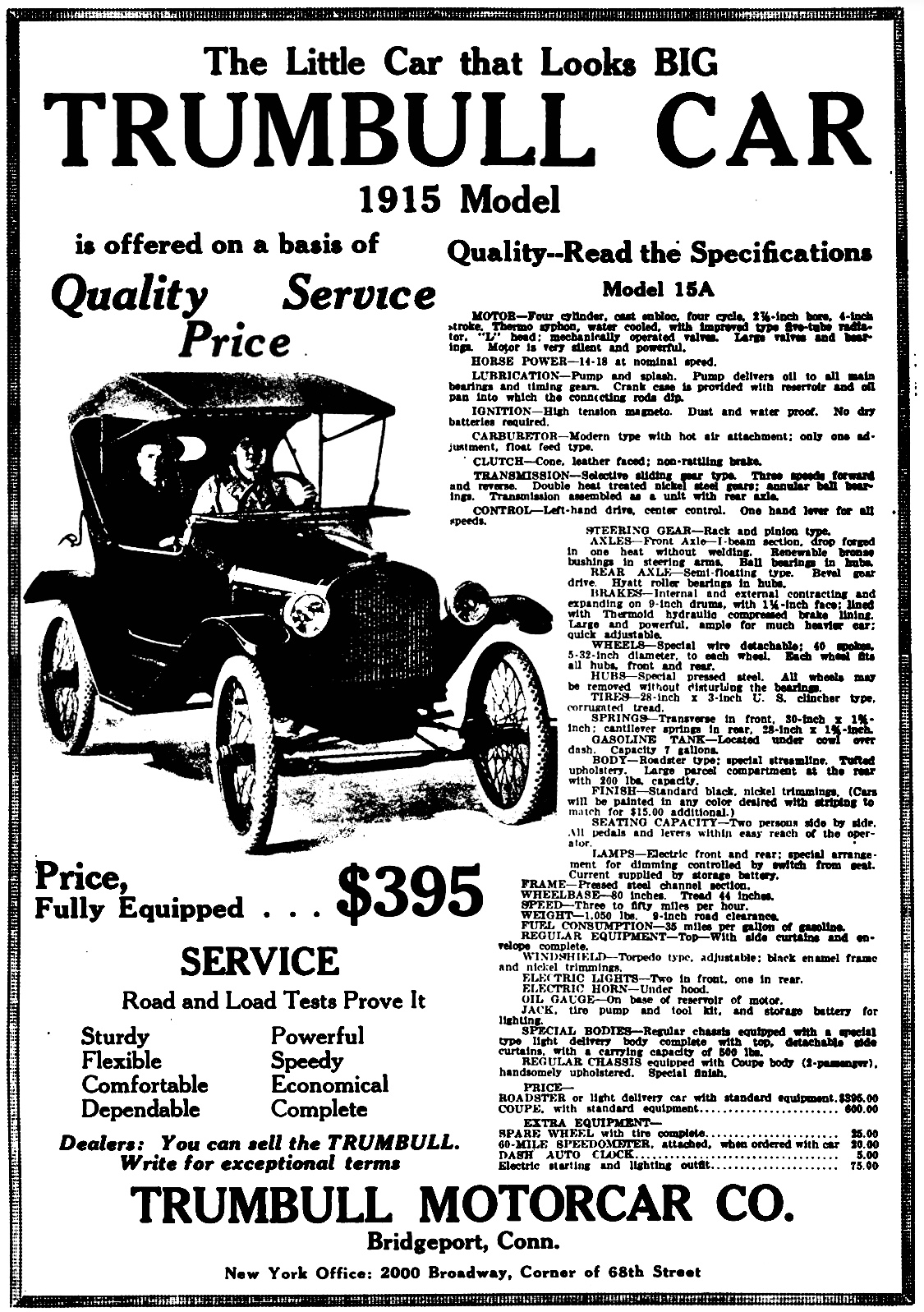
Trumbull Model 15 A (1915)

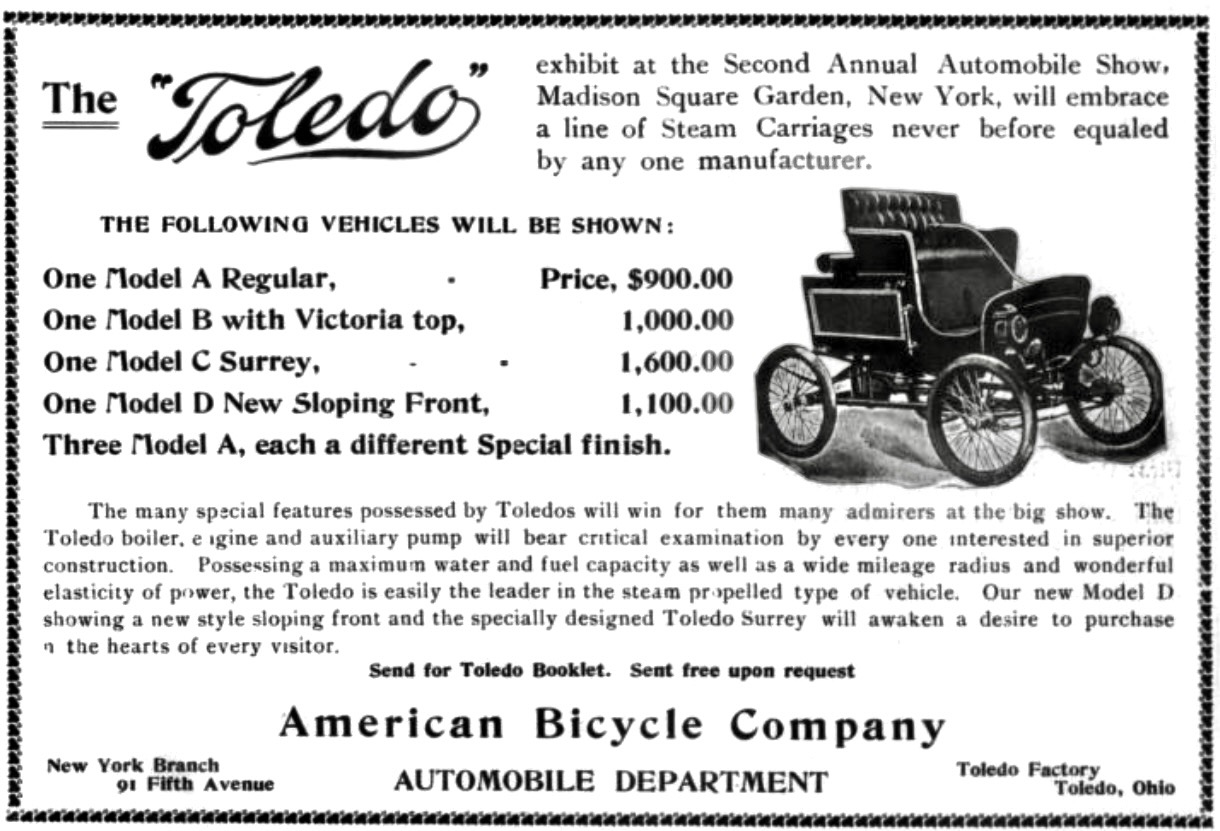
Toledo advertisement (1901)

- Tarkington (1922–1923)
- Taunton (1901–1903)
  Steam cars
- Templar (1917–1924)
- Templeton-Dubrie (1910)
- Terraplane (1932–1939)
- Terwilliger (1904)
  Empire Steamer model
- Texan (1920–1922)
- Thomas (1902–1919)
- Thomas-Detroit (1906–1908)
- Thompson (1901–1907)
  Steam cars
- Thresher Electric (1900)
- Tiffany Electric (1913–1914)
- Tiger (1914–1915)
- Tincher (1903–1909)
- Tinker & Piper Steam (1899)
- Tinkham (1898–1899)
- Toledo (1901–1903)
- Tonawanda
- Torbensen (1902–1906)
- Touraine (1912–1916)
- Tourist (1902–1910)
- Tractobile (1900–1902)
- Trask-Detroit (1922–1923)
- Traveler (1907–1908)
- Trebert (1907–1908)
- Trimoto (1900–1901)
  Also known as Tri-Motor
- Trinity Steamer
- Triumph (1907–1912)
- Trumbull (1914–1915)
- Tucker (1946–1949)
- Tulsa (1918–1922)
- Twentieth Century Motor Car Corporation (1974–1978)
- Twin City (1914)
- Twombly (1913–1915)
- Twyford (1899–1902, 1904–1907)

== U ==
- US Automobile (1899–1901)
- Union (1902–1905)
- Union Sales Company (1911–1912)
- United (1919–1920)
- United States (1899–1903)
  Electric cars
- United States Long Distance
- United States Motor Company (1910–1913)
- Unito (1908–1910)
- Universal (1914)
- Upton Machine Company (1902–1903)
- Upton Motor Company (1905–1907)

== V ==
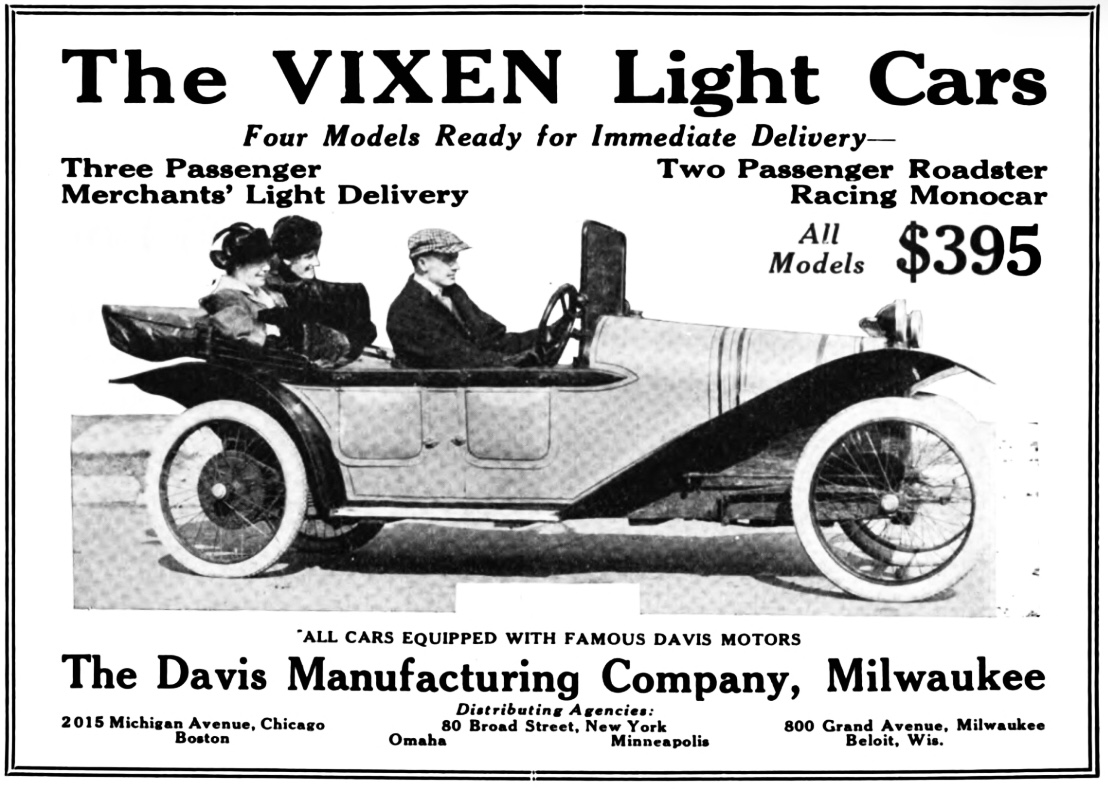
Vixen (1914–1916)

- Van (1911–1912)
- Van Wagoner (1899–1903)
- Vaughn (1909)
- V.E. (1901–1906)
  Also known as V.E.C. Electric
- Vector (1971–1999, 2006–2010)
- Velie (1908–1929)
- Vernon (Able 8; 1918–1921)
- Victor (1905–1911)
- Victor Page Motors Corp (1921–1924)
- Victor Steamer (1899–1903)
  Previously Overman Steam (1895–1898)
- Victormobile (1900–1901)
  'Steamer' model
- Victory (1920–1921)
- Viking (1907–1908)
- Viking (1929–1931)
- Virginian (1911–1912)
- Vixen (1914–1916)
- Vulcan (1913–1915)

== W ==
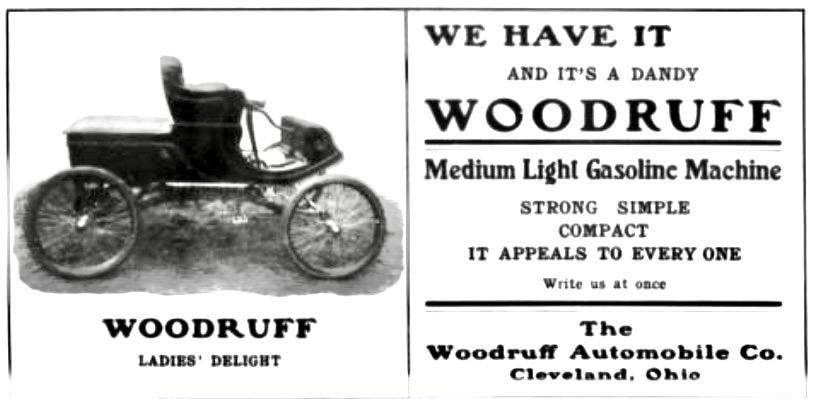
Woodruff advertisement (1902)

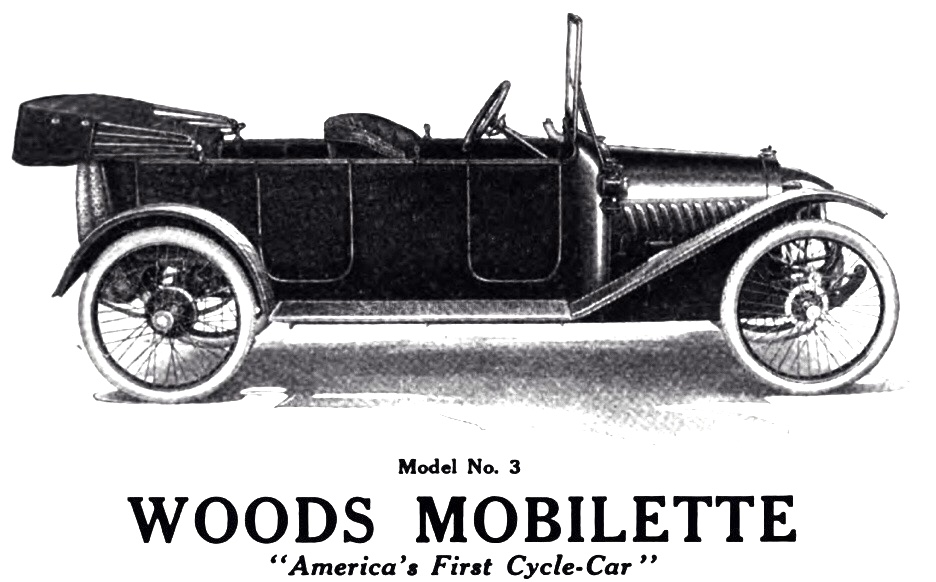
Woods Mobilette Model 3 (1914)

- Waco (1915–1917)
- Wagenhals (1910–1915)
- Wahl (1913–1914)
- Waldron (1908–1911)
- Walker Motor Car Company (1905–1906)
- Wall (1900–1903)
- Walter (1902–1909)(1905–1909)
- Waltham Steam (1898–1902)
- Waltham Manufacturing Co (1899–1910)
  'Orient' model
- Walworth (1904–1905)
- Ward (1913–1914)
- Ward Electric (1914–1916)
- Ware Steam Wagon (1861–1867)
- Warren (1910–1913)
- Warwick (1901–1905)
- Washington (1921–1924)
- Wasp (1919–1924)
- Waterloo (1903–1905)
- Watrous (1905)
- Watt (1910)
- Waukesha (1906–1910)
- Waverley Electric (1898–1903, 1909–1916)
- Webb Jay (1908)
- Weidely Motor Company (1915–1917)
- Welch Motor Car Company (1901–1911)
- Westcott (1909–1925)
- Westfield (1901–1903)
- W.F.S. (1911–1912)
- Whaley-Henriette (1898–1900)
- Wharton (1922–1923)
- Wheeler Manufacturing Company (1904)
- Whippet (1927–1931)
- White Motor Company (1900–1918)
- White Star (1909–1911)
- Whiting Motor Car Co (1910–1912)
- Whitmore, M.C. Co (1914)
  Arrow Cyclecar model
- Whitney (1896–1900)
- Wilcox (1909–1910)
- Wildman (1902)
- Wills (C. H.) and Company (1921–1927)
- Willys (1916–1918, 1930–1942, 1953–1963)
- Willys-Knight (1914–1933)
- Willys-Overland (1912–1953)
- Wilson (1903–1905)
- Windsor (1929–1930)
- Wing (1922)
- Winther (1921–1923)
- Winton (1896–1924)
- Wolfe (1907–1909)
- Wolverine (1904–1906)
- Wolverine (1927–1928)
- Woodill (1952–1956)
- Woodruff (1902–1904)
- Woods Electric (1899–1916)
  Renamed to Woods Dual Power for 1917–1918
- Woods Mobilette (1913–1916)
- Worth (J.M.) Gas Engine Manufacturing Co (1902)
- Worth (1906–1910)

== X ==
- Xander (1901–1902)

== Y ==
- Yale (1916–1918)
- Yellow Cab Manufacturing Company (1920–1925)
- Yellow Coach Manufacturing Company (1923–1943)

== Z ==
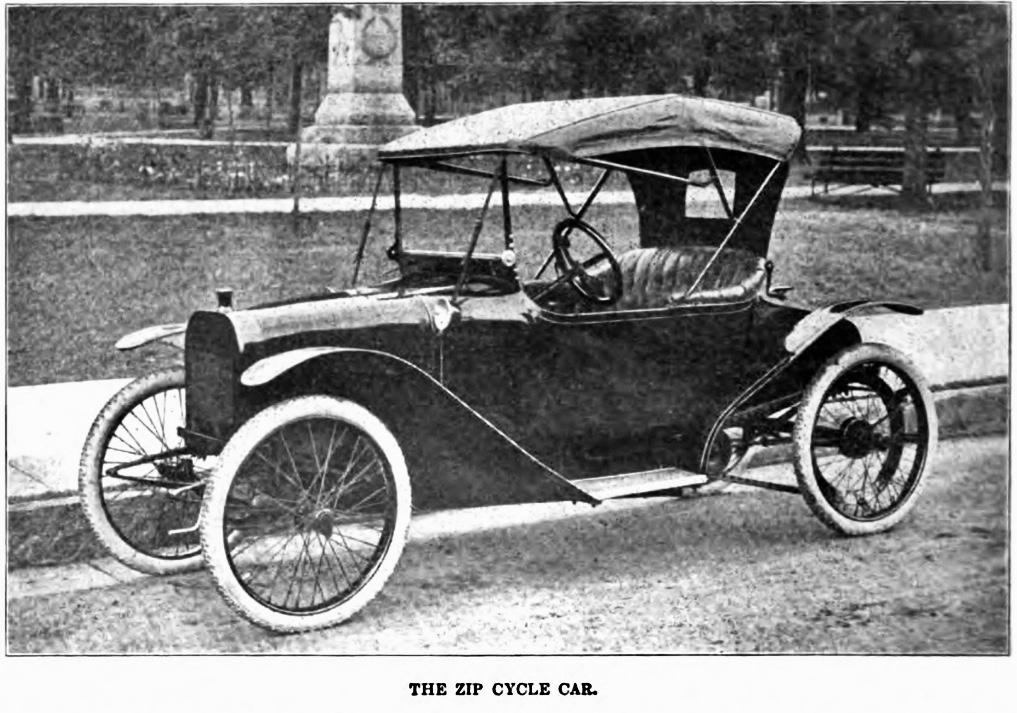
Zip Cycle Car (1913–1914)

- Zehr (1912–1915)
- Zent (1900–1902, 1904–1906)
- Zentmobile (1903)
- Zimmer Motorcars (1978–1988)
- Zimmerman (1908–1915)
- Zip (1913–1914)

== See also ==
- List of automobile manufacturers
- List of automobile manufacturers of the United States
- List of motorcycle manufacturers
- List of pickup trucks
- List of American truck manufacturers
- List of truck manufacturers

== Sources ==
- Automobile Quarterly (eds.). The American Car Since 1775. Kutztown, PA: Automobile Quarterly, Inc., 1971. ISBN 0-525-05300-X
- Bird, Anthony and Douglas-Scott Montagu of Beaulieu, Edward: Steam Cars, 1770–1970, Littlehampton Book Services Ltd., 1971. ISBN 0-304-93707-X: ISBN 978-0-304-93707-3
- Clymer, Floyd. Treasury of Early American Automobiles, 1877–1925. New York: Bonanza Books, 1950.
- Clymer, Floyd and Gahagan, Harry W.: Floyd Clymer's Steam Car Scrapbook, Literary Licensing, LLC, 2012. ISBN 1-258-42699-4; ISBN 978-1-258-42699-6
- Georgano, Nick (Ed.). The Beaulieu Encyclopedia of the Automobile. Chicago: Fitzroy Dearborn, 2000. ISBN 1-57958-293-1
- Evans, Richard J.: Steam Cars (Shire Album), Shire Publications Ltd (booklet) 1985. ISBN 0-85263-774-8; ISBN 978-0-85263-774-6
- Headfield, John: American Steam-Car Pioneers: A Scrapbook (1st edition). Newcomen Society in North, 1984. ISBN 9994065904; ISBN 978-9994065905
- Kimes, Beverly R.; Clark, Henry A. (1975). The Standard Catalog of American Cars 1805–1945. Krause Publications. ISBN 0-87341-111-0.
- Kimes, Beverly R.; Clark, Henry A. (1985). The Standard Catalog of American Cars 1805–1945. Krause Publications. ISBN 0-87341-045-9.
- Kimes, Beverly R.; Clark, Henry A. (1996). The Standard Catalog of American Cars 1805–1942 (3rd ed.). Iola, Wisconsin: Krause. ISBN 0-87341-428-4.
- Kirsch, David A.: The Electric Vehicle and the Burden of History. Rutgers University Press, New Brunswick NJ and London, 2000. ISBN 0-8135-2809-7
