= J. H. Dawson Machinery Company =

Defunct American motor vehicle manufacturer

- Founded: 1904; 122 years ago
- Founder: J. H. Dawson
- Defunct: 1904; 122 years ago
- Fate: Fire
- Headquarters: Chicago, United States
- Products: Automobiles
- Production output: unknown (1904)
- Brands: Dawson

The J. H. Dawson Machinery Company was an automobile manufacturer in Chicago, in 1904.

== History ==
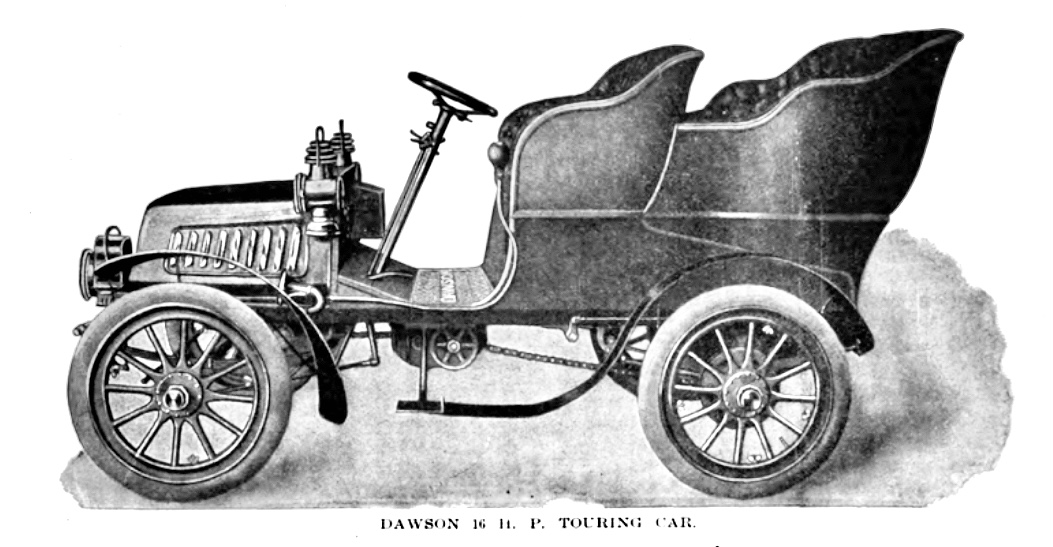
Dawson 16 HP Touring (1904)

The company was based in Chicago, Illinois. In 1904, it manufactured automobiles that were marketed as Dawson. A large fire the same year destroyed the factory, leading to the company's dissolution. There was no connection to the Dawson Manufacturing Company, which had previously used the same brand name.

== Models ==
- 16 HP Touring
- 16 HP Runabout

The two-cylinder engine was mounted upright under the hood and produced 16 horsepower. The water cooling was supported by a lavishly designed radiator. The gearbox had two forward gears and one reverse gear.

== See also ==
- List of defunct United States automobile manufacturers
- Veteran vehicles
