= Springfield Automobile Company =

Defunct American motor vehicle manufacturer

- Formerly: Springfield Automobile & Industrial Company
- Founded: 1903; 122 years ago
- Founder: C. Bramwell and C. C. Bramwell
- Defunct: 1905; 120 years ago
- Fate: Bankruptcy
- Headquarters: Springfield, Ohio, United States
- Products: Automobiles
- Production output: unknown (1903-1905)
- Brands: Bramwell ; Springfield

The Springfield Automobile Company was an automobile manufacturer in Springfield, Ohio, from 1903 to 1905.

== History ==
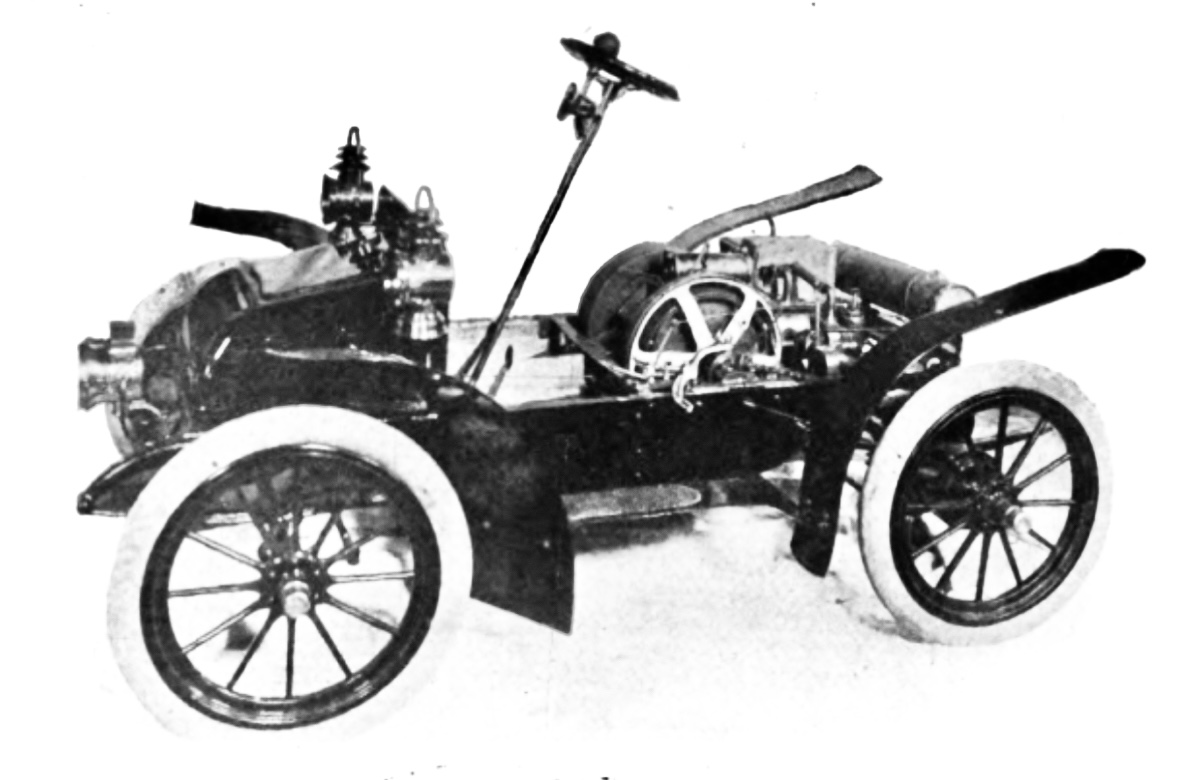
Bramwell 8HP (1904-1905)

W. C. Bramwell and his son C. C. Bramwell were able to gain experience with their own vehicle designs at the company Bramwell-Robinson-Automobile. After the falling out between Robinson and the Bramwells, the vehicle based on the Bramwell-Robinson Model B was to be produced as a revised version by the Springfield Automobile Company. The first vehicles were marketed as Springfield and later as Bramwell. The production was about three vehicles per week.

== Models ==
- Bramwell 8HP
  - wheel base 1829 mm
  - tread 1372 mm
  - weight 522 kg

== See also ==
- List of defunct United States automobile manufacturers
- Veteran vehicles
