= Friedman Automobile Company =

Defunct American motor vehicle manufacturer

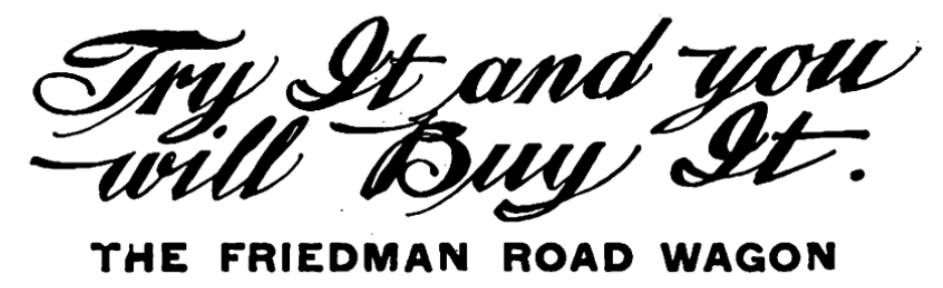
- Friedman
- Founded: 1900; 126 years ago
- Founder: Oscar J. Friedman, Walter W. Robinson
- Defunct: 1903; 123 years ago
- Headquarters: Chicago, United States
- Products: Automobiles
- Production output: unknown (1900-1903)
- Brands: Friedman, Ideal

The Friedman Automobile Company was an automobile manufacturer in Chicago, from 1900 to 1903.

== History ==
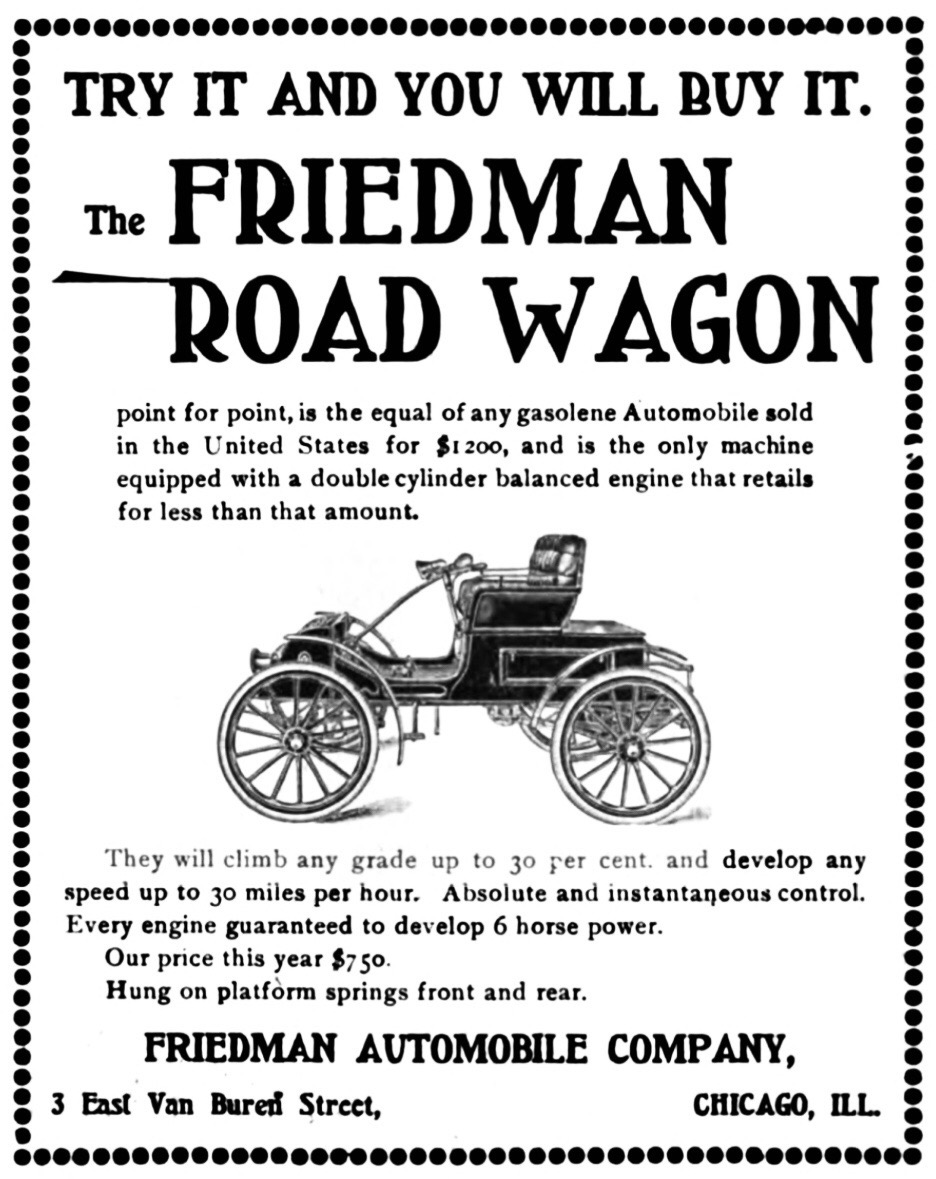
Friedman 6HP Runabout (1902)

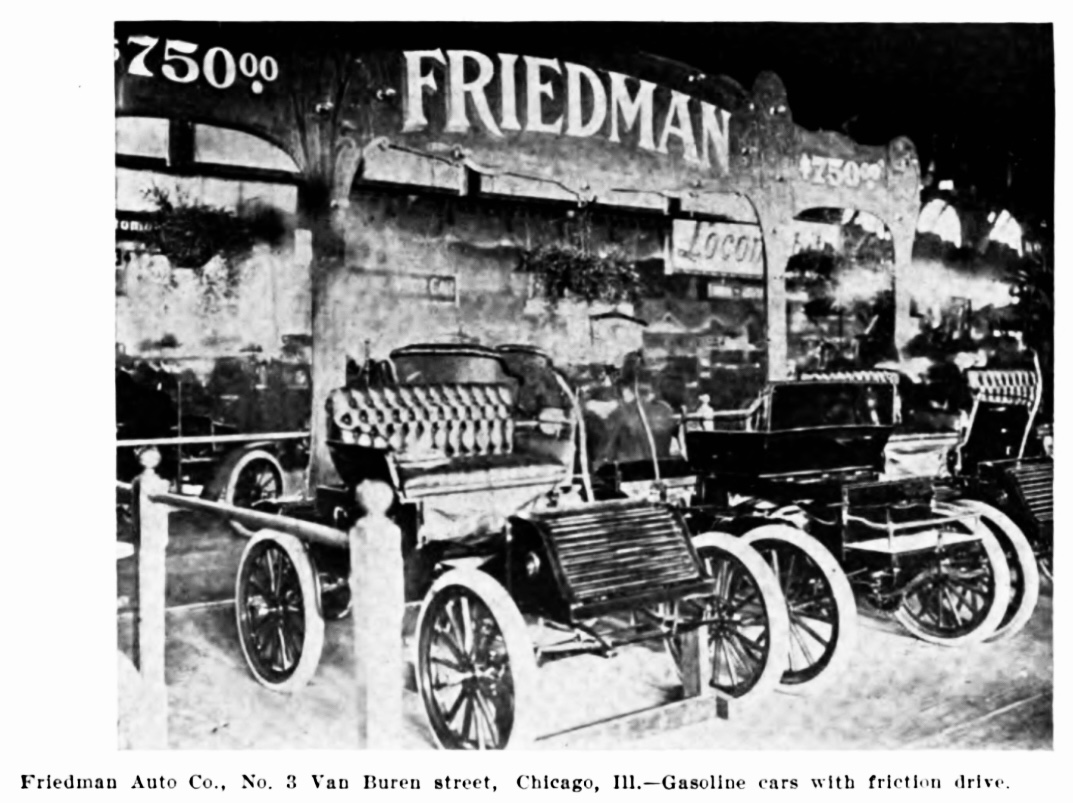
Friedman Two Cylinder 6 HP and One Cylinder 5 HP

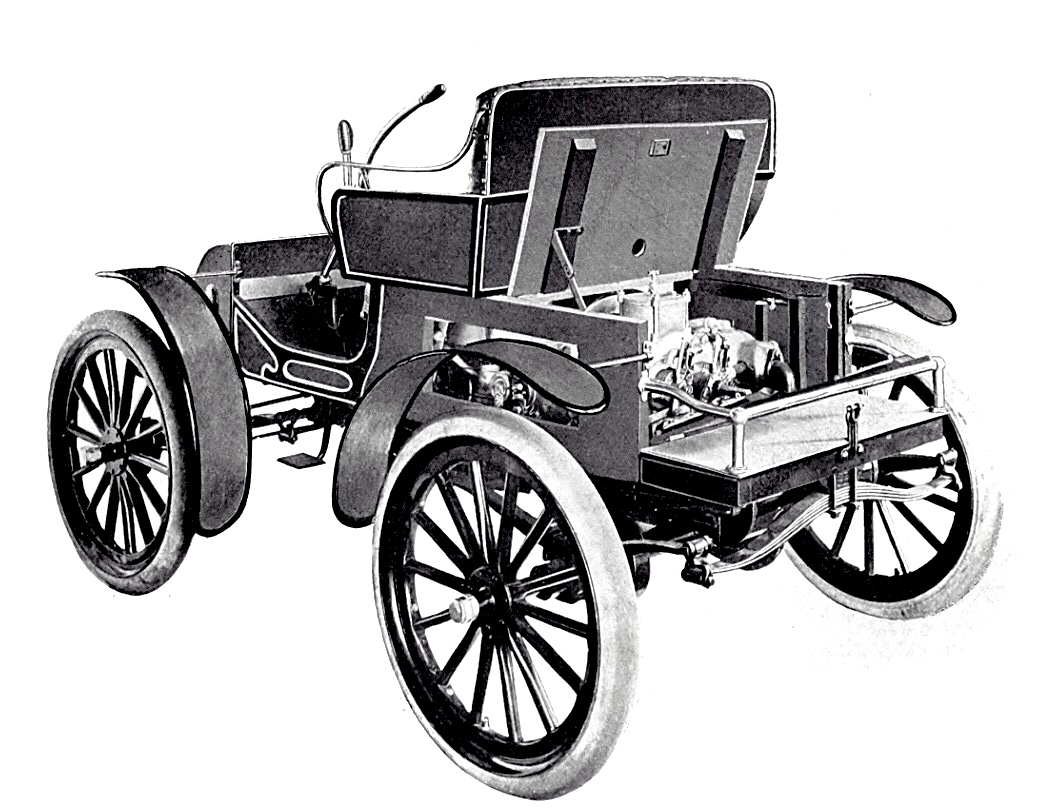
Friedman 6HP (1902)

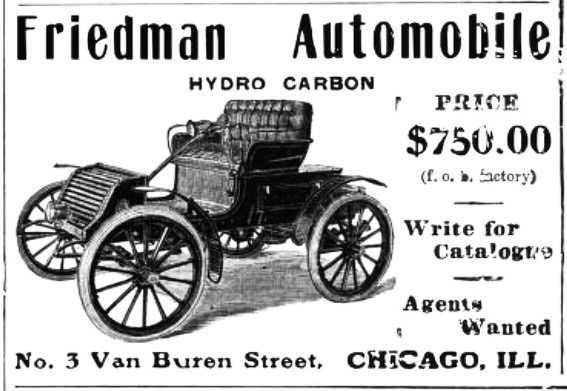
Friedman (1902)

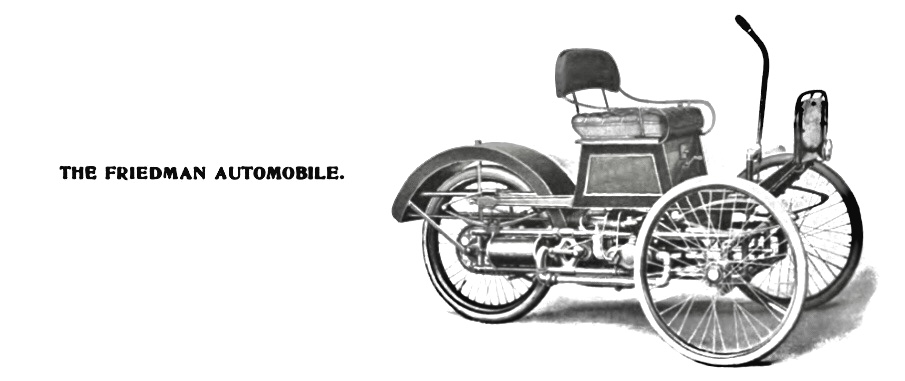
Friedman three-wheeled vehicle from 1899

Oscar J. Friedman and his friend Walter W. Robinson were interested in automobiles and bought the Sterling Cycle Works to experiment with motor vehicles. The result in 1899 was a three-wheeled vehicle with an Otto engine. The Friedman Automobile Company was founded in Chicago on East Van Buren Street No. 3. Since they were not able to produce a larger number of vehicles in their small workshop, they commissioned the National Sewing Machine Company to produce 525 vehicles. The brand name was initially Friedman. However, the National Sewing Machine Company was unable to deliver enough vehicles according to the order. In April 1903, Friedman sued for $100,000 in damages. In 1902, the company joined the National Association of Automobile Manufacturers.

== Models ==
- Friedman three-wheeled vehicle 3 HP (1899)
- Friedman Runabout 6HP
  - The displacement of the twin-cylinder engine was 1538 cc with a bore of 95.25 mm and a stroke of 107.95 mm.
- Friedman 5 HP (One Cylinder)

== See also ==
- List of defunct United States automobile manufacturers
- Veteran vehicles
