= Hoover Cyclecar =

American cyclecar

The Hoover Cyclecar was an American cyclecar manufactured by H. H. Hoover in St. Louis, Missouri; a company was established to manufacture the vehicle in October 1913. It was a two-passenger vehicle powered by a single-cylinder, 5 hp (3.7 kW) engine. Fitted with wire wheels, the engine drove the vehicle via a chain drive, with a wheelbase of 84 in (210 cm) and a weight of 350 lb (160 kg).

Marketed at a list price of $375, the Hoover Cyclecar's inventor claimed that he was able to travel 55 mi (89 km) on 1 US gal (3.8 L) of gasoline. It is uncertain how many of the vehicles were produced.
