= Bugmobile Company =

Defunct American motor vehicle manufacturer

Bugmobile Company of America
- Industry: Automotive
- Founded: July 1907
- Defunct: 1909
- Headquarters: Chicago, Illinois, United States
- Products: Automobiles

The Bugmobile company was founded in July 1907 in Chicago, Illinois.

== History ==
The Bugmobile Company was an American company founded in 1907. Production began late in 1907 for the 1908 model year. The cars had unique features such as an angle steel frame from which the entire engine and transmission was suspended. The transmission was selective with final drive. The company went out of business in 1909.

== Models ==
Model	Engine	HP	Wheelbase
Model A	2-cylinder	12	68"
Model B	2-cylinder	12	76"
Model C	2-cylinder	15	76"

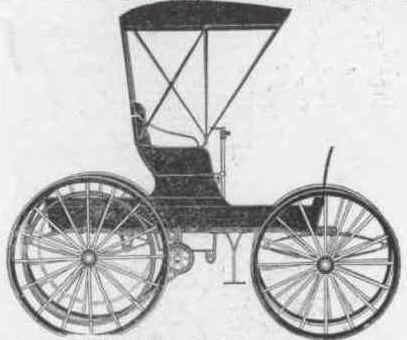
1908 Bugmobile Model A

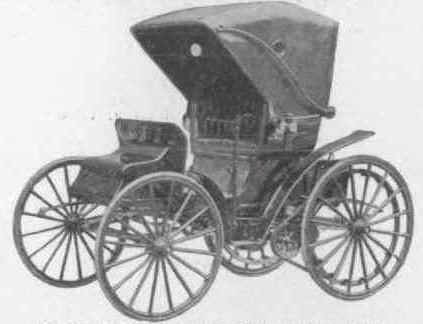
1908 Bugmobile Model B
