= Gasmobile =

Defunct American motor vehicle manufacturer

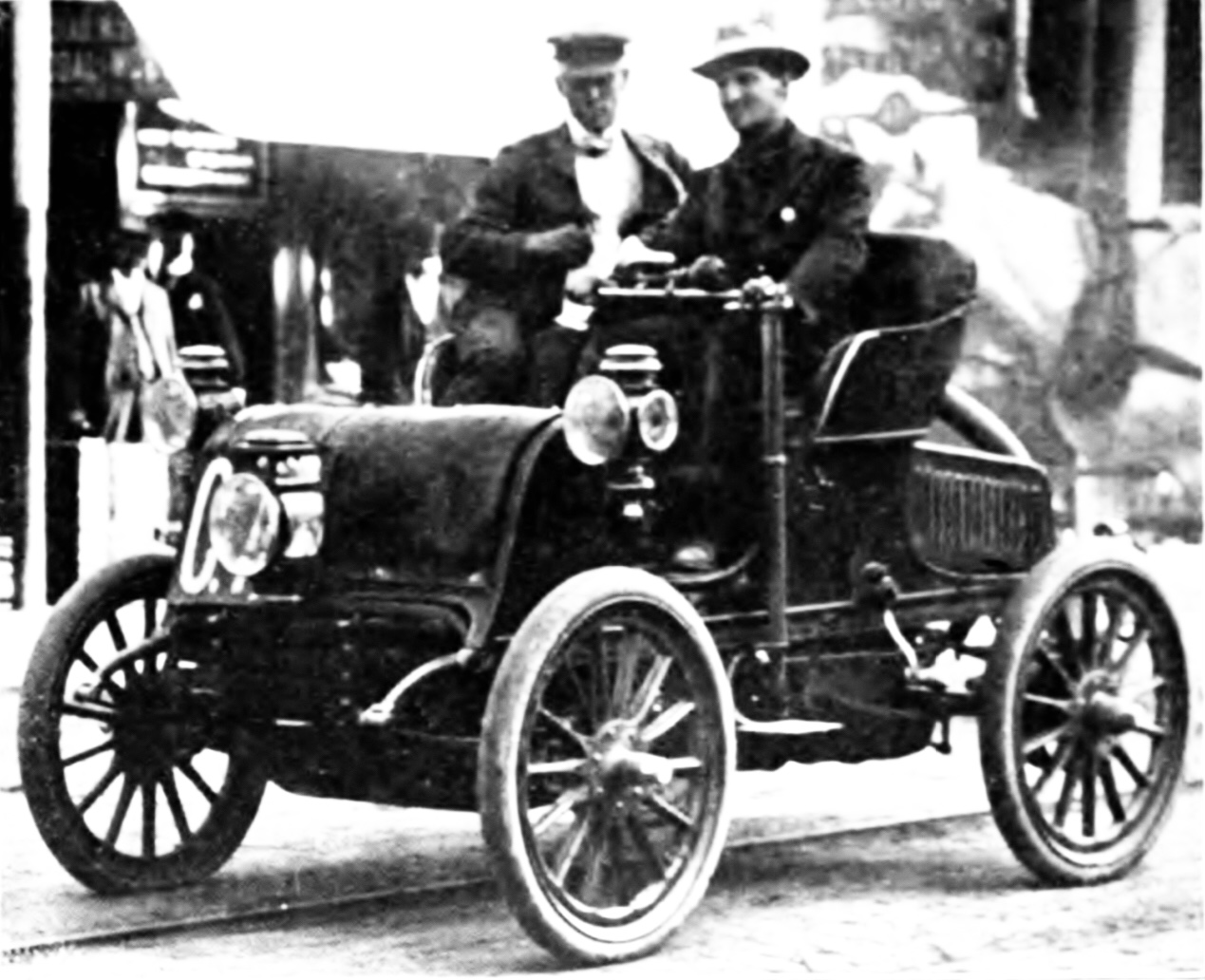
1901 Gasmobile 9HP

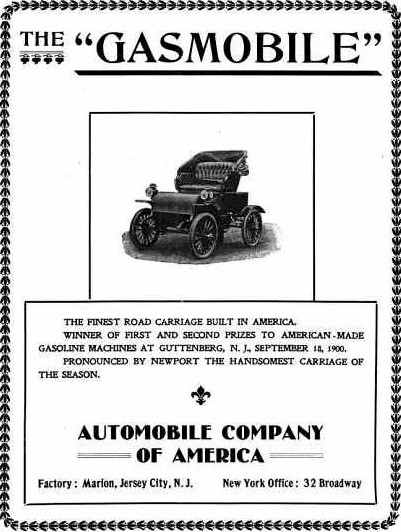
Gasmobile advertisement from 1900

The Gasmobile, originally called the American, was an automobile first produced in 1899. The name was changed to Gasmobile in 1900 by president John H. Flager. It appeared at the New York Auto Show in 1900. By 1901, 140 cars were made. One of its distinctive features was an automatic starting device. After producing a six-cylinder car, the company folded in 1902.

== Models ==
Year	Engine(Horsepower)	Wheelbase
1899-1901	1-cylinder(3 hp)	N/A
1902	3-cylinder(9, 12, or 20 hp)	71 in (1,803 mm)
1902	4-cylinder(25 hp)	88.5 in (2,248 mm)
1902	6-cylinder(35 hp)	88.5 in (2,248 mm)
