= Åtvidaberg (automobile) =

Previous Swedish brand of car

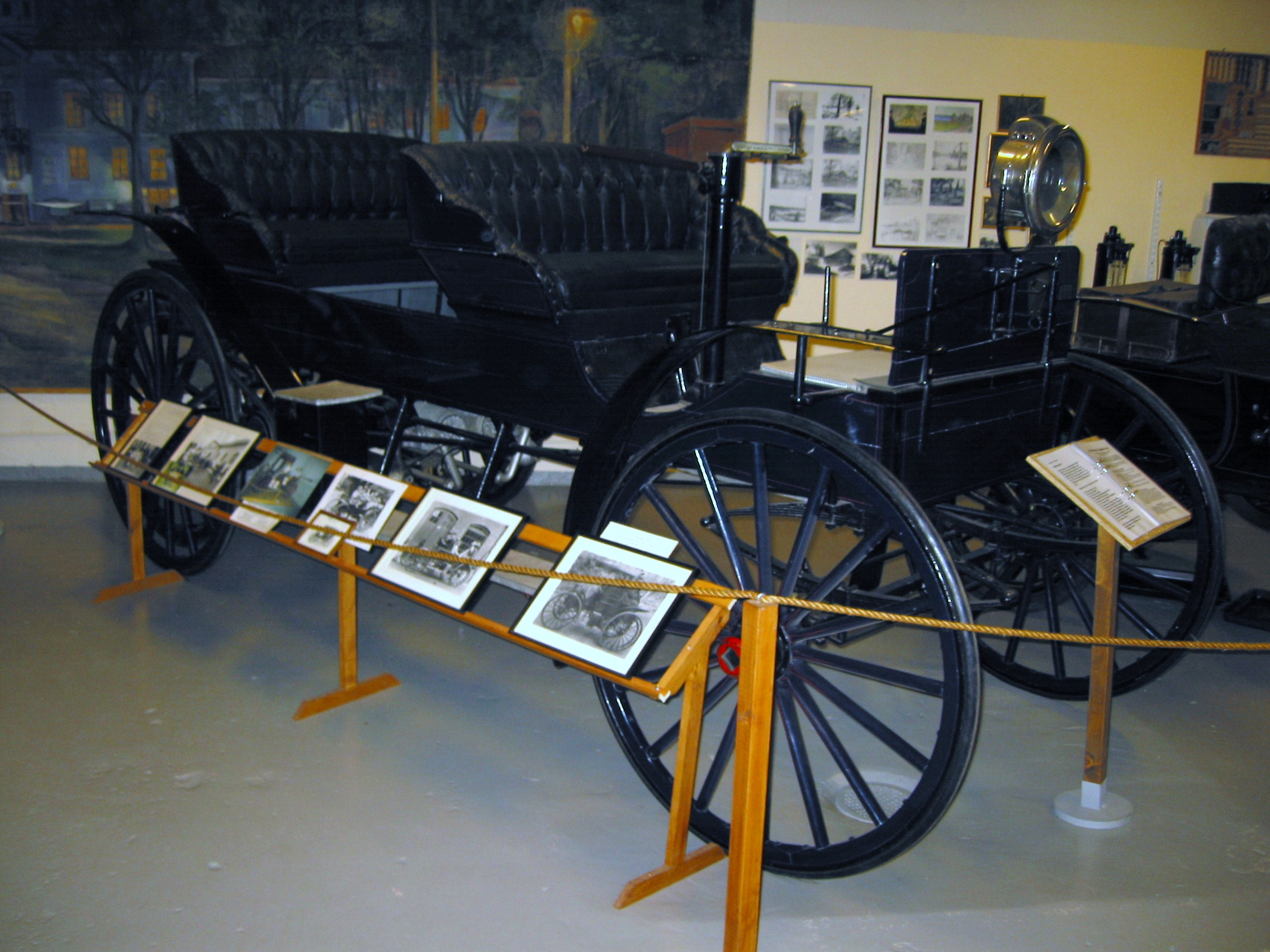
Atvidaberg, 1910

The Åtvidaberg was a Swedish automobile manufactured from 1910 to 1911.

Åtvidabergs Vagnfabrik AB began by importing an American Holsman high wheeler and using it as a pattern. The car used a flat-twin engine; its top speed was about 45 km/h (28 mph). Some of the later engines had four cylinders. The gearbox was two-speed, and the entire engine was slid backwards under the frame to engage reverse. 35 cars were planned, of which 12 were built, the rest converted for use in railway inspection.
