= High wheel =

High Wheel may refer to:

- Penny-farthing bicycle
- High Entrance/Exit Turnstile (HEET)
- High wheeler, an early automobile body style
