= Simplo =

Defunct American motor vehicle manufacturer

Simplo Cook Motor Vehicle Company
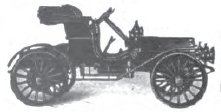
- 1908 Simplo Model C runabaout
- Industry: Automotive
- Founded: 1908; 118 years ago
- Defunct: 1909; 117 years ago
- Fate: converted to automobile dealership
- Headquarters: St. Louis, Missouri, United States
- Products: High wheeler
- Production output: unknown (1908-1909)
- Brands: Simplo

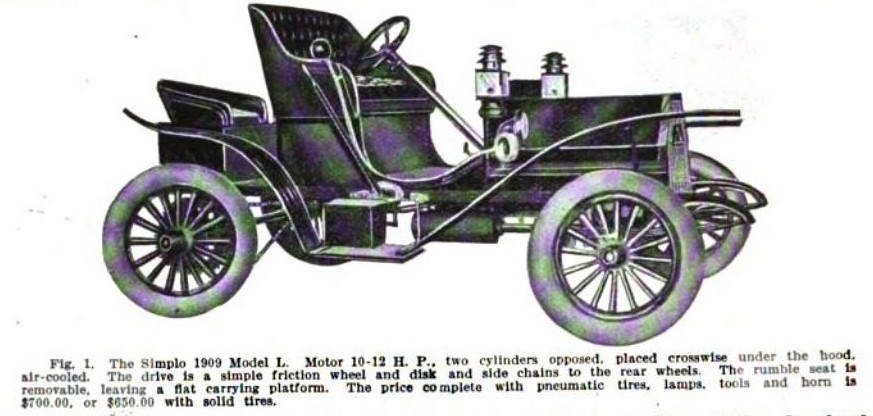
1909 Simplo Model L from article in Cycle and Automobile Trade Journal

The Simplo was an American high wheeler automobile manufactured from 1908 until 1909 by the Cook Motor Vehicle Company in St. Louis, Missouri.

== History ==
Cook Motor Vehicle Company of St. Louis advertised the Simplo as The biggest automobile value in America. Several variations were offered; air or water-cooled 2-cylinder engines and both solid or pneumatic tires. The Simplo featured a friction transmission, double chain drive and right-hand wheel steering on the runabout, priced at $600, equivalent to $12,696 in 2025.

In 1909, roadster and surrey models were added, but after a year of trying, the Cook Motor Vehicle Company decided to become a multi-marque automobile dealership.
