= James (automobile company) =

Defunct American motor vehicle manufacturer

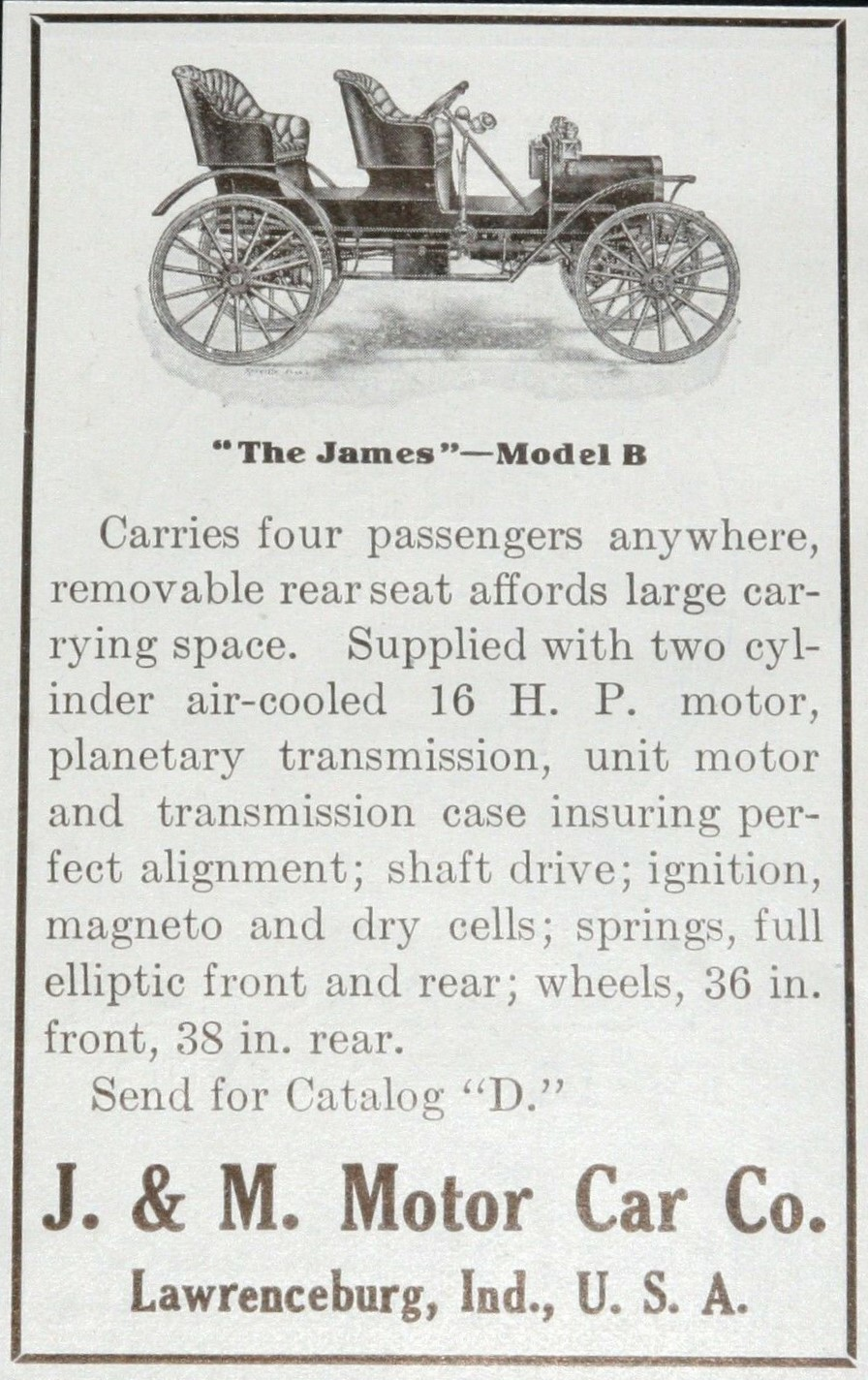
- 1909 James Model B Advertisement - Cycle and Automobile Trade Journal

Overview
- Type: High-wheeler
- Manufacturer: J. & M. Motor Car Company
- Production: 1909–1911
- Designer: H. K. James, President

The James automobile manufactured by the J & M Motor Car Company of Lawrenceburg, Indiana was produced from 1909 to 1911.

== History ==
H. K. James tested his first car, called a Model A, on April 2, 1909, on a 100-mile test run. A reporter from Cycle and Automobile Trade Journal wrote that the James "will climb any ordinary hill with two or four passengers." The Model A was a high wheeler and cost between $700 and $800 (equivalent to $28,667 in 2025). Production was minimal, and in 1911 the company switched production to a larger car called the Dearborn. It lasted one year.

== Models ==
Model (year)	Engine	Horsepower	wheelbase	wheel diameter	transmission
Model A (1909–1910)	2-cylinder	14	90 inches	36in. front	planetary
Model B (1909–0910)	2-cylinder	14	90 inches	36in. front	planetary
Model C (1909–1910)	2-cylinder	14-16	90 inches	36in. front	planetary
Dearborn (1911)	4-cylinder	35	90 inches	N/A	N/A

== See also ==
- High wheeler
- Brass Era car
