= Albaugh-Dover Co. =

Defunct American motor vehicle manufacturer

Albaugh-Dover Co. (Aldo)
- Industry: Automobile, Tractor, Farm implement, Gear cutting
- Founded: 1910
- Defunct: 1924
- Headquarters: Chicago, Illinois, USA
- Key people: Gilbert R. Albaugh
- Products: automobiles, tractors, farm implement, gears
- Subsidiaries: Square Turn Tractor Company (1917-1925)

The Albaugh-Dover Co. was an American manufacturer of farm implements, tractors, and automobiles based in Chicago, Illinois.

== Automobiles ==
The Aldo was a simply-constructed, high-wheeled, two-passenger motor buggy sold from 1910 until early 1911. It featured an air-cooled, opposed two-cylinder engine with 12 hp (N.A.C.C. rating) of 106.9 cu in (1,752 cc) displacement. The vehicle used a planetary transmission with double chain drive, and tiller steering. Wheelbase measured 76 in (1,900 mm), and the large carriage wheels 36 × 1.5 in. It had a right hand drive configuration.

The selling price was $395, but very few were sold. Albaugh-Dover then discontinued automobile production and concentrated on their farm implement (cream separators) and gear cutting business.

== Tractors ==
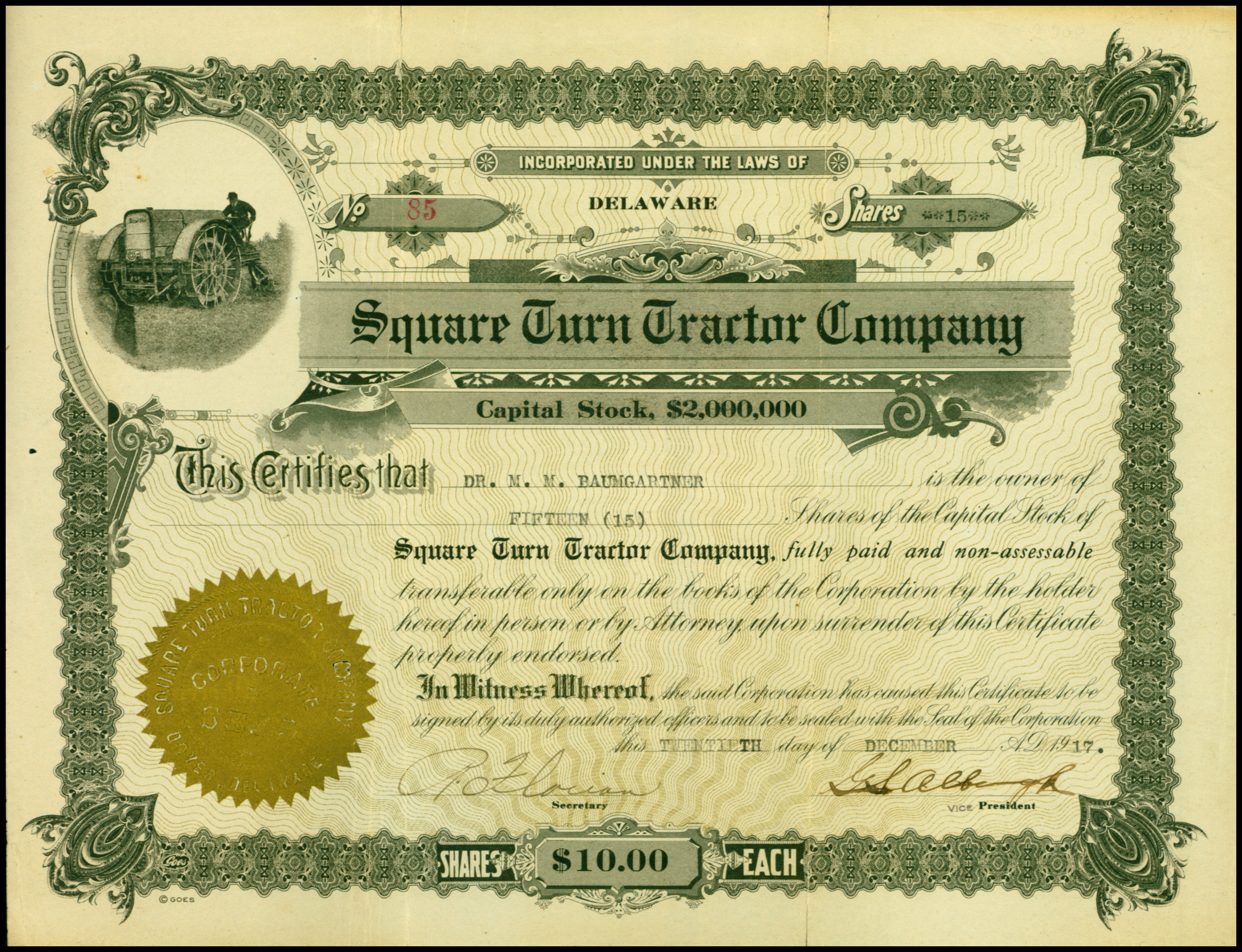
Share of the Square Turn Tractor Company, issued 20. December 1917

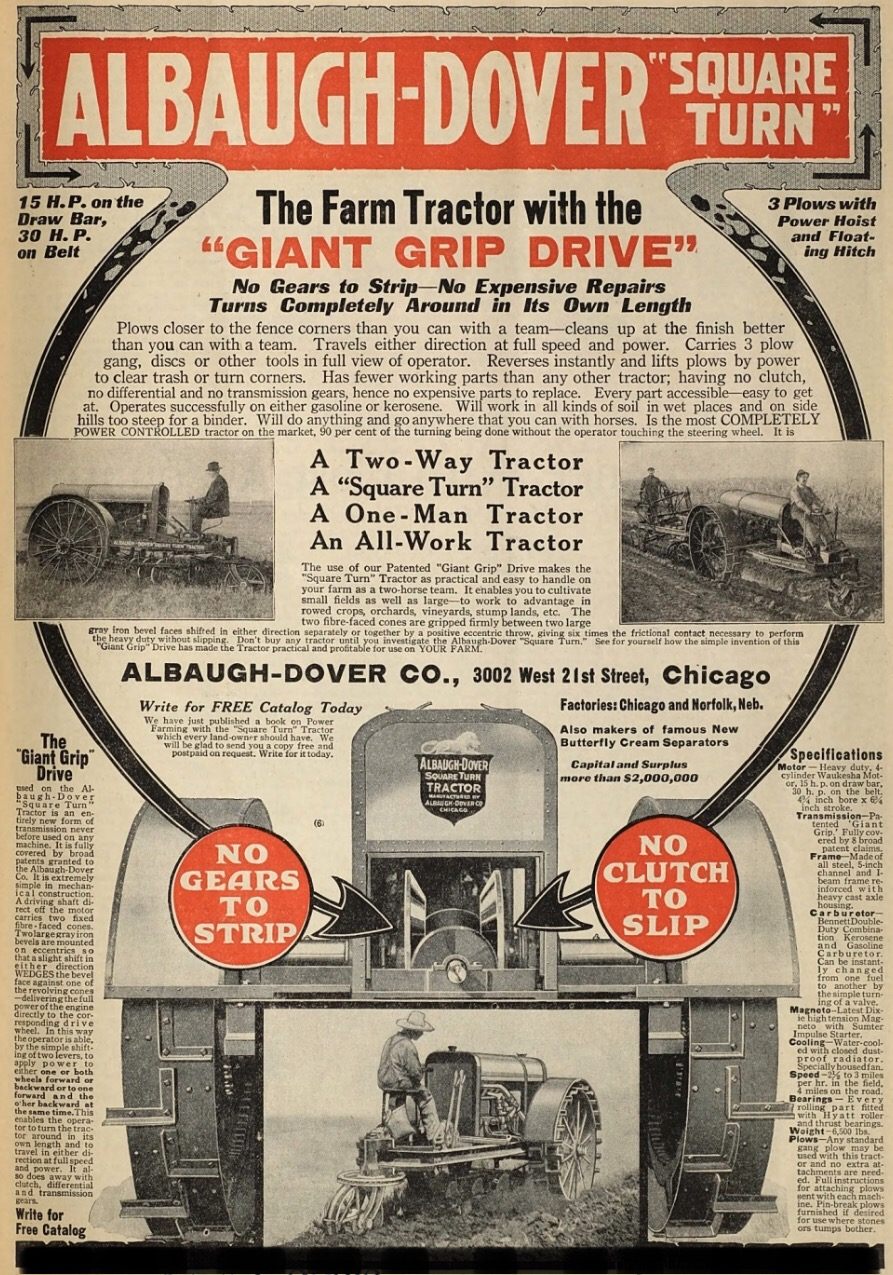
Albaugh-Dover advertisement (1917)

In December 1917, the company moved into the production of tractors by buying the ailing Kennell-Colwell Co. of Norfolk, Nebraska. It was renamed the Square Turn Tractor Company and operated as a subsidiary. The tractor was sold as the Albaugh-Dover "Square Turn" from Chicago.

It was a curious looking vehicle in a motorized tricycle layout. Its four-cylinder engine was mounted on a rear axle with large iron wheels. The driver sat behind a small, steerable iron front wheel, and directly in front of the grille. The engine was a Climax Model K with a bore of 5 in (130 mm) and a stroke of 6.5 in (170 mm), resulting in a displacement of 510.5 cu in (8,366 cc). Power output measured 18 hp at the draw bar and 35 hp on the pulley. This engine ran on either gasoline or kerosene.

The transmission was called Giant Grip Drive, with "no clutch to slip" and "no gear to strip". This indicates a friction drive. Base price was $1,875, which included an Oliver plow. The complete vehicle weight was 7,800 lb (3,540 kg). Albaugh-Dover mentioned that the tractor could be used by only one operator.

In 1924, Albaugh-Dover was acquired by a group of former shareholders. After investing $200,000, it was reorganized as the Albaugh-Dover Manufacturing Company, and returned solely to farm implement production and gear cutting. The Square Turn Tractor Company was sold by sheriff's order in 1925.
