= Hobbie Accessible =

Defunct American motor vehicle manufacturer

The Hobbie Accessible was an American automobile manufactured in Hampton, Iowa from 1908 until 1909. One of many high wheeler cars produced at the time, it featured a twin-cylinder air-cooled engine, tiller steering, and solid tires.
