= DeWitt Motor Company =

Defunct American motor vehicle manufacturer

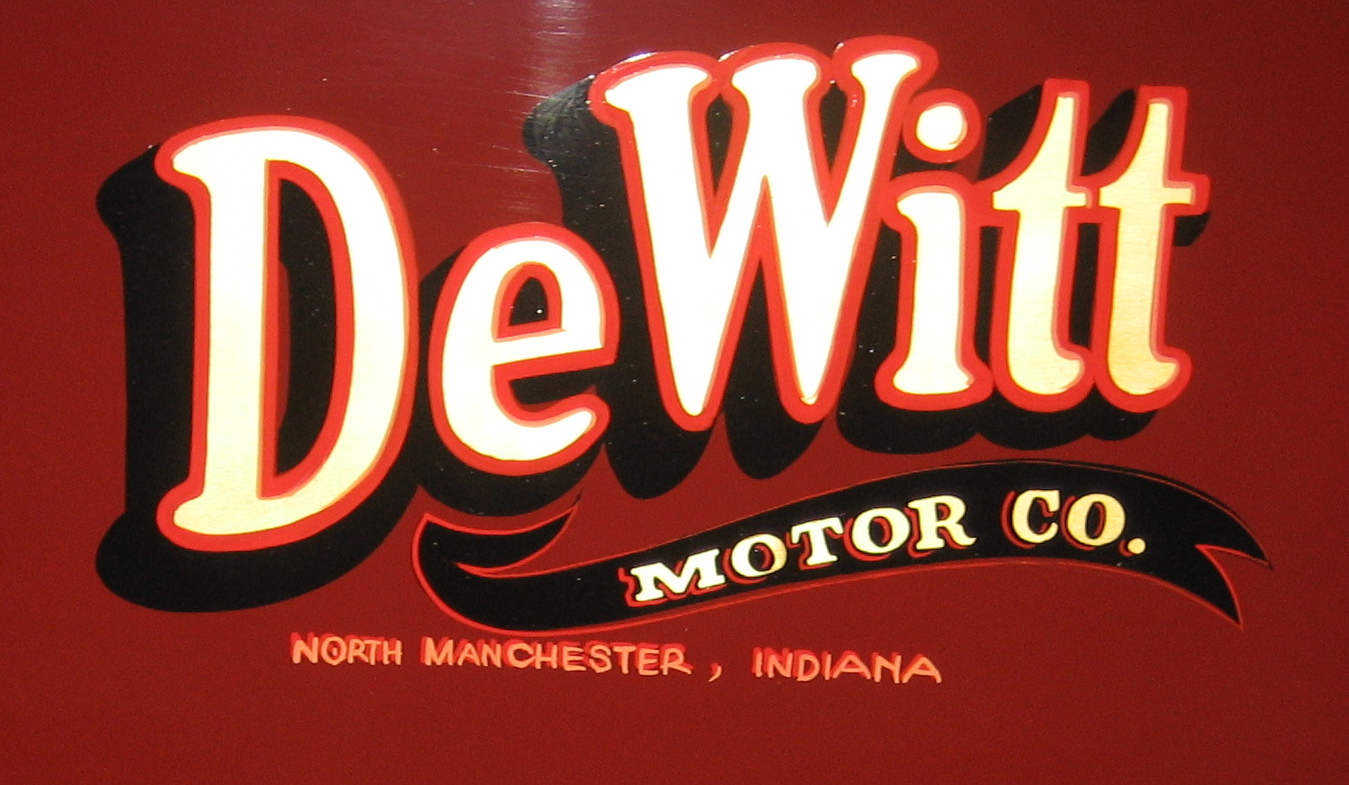

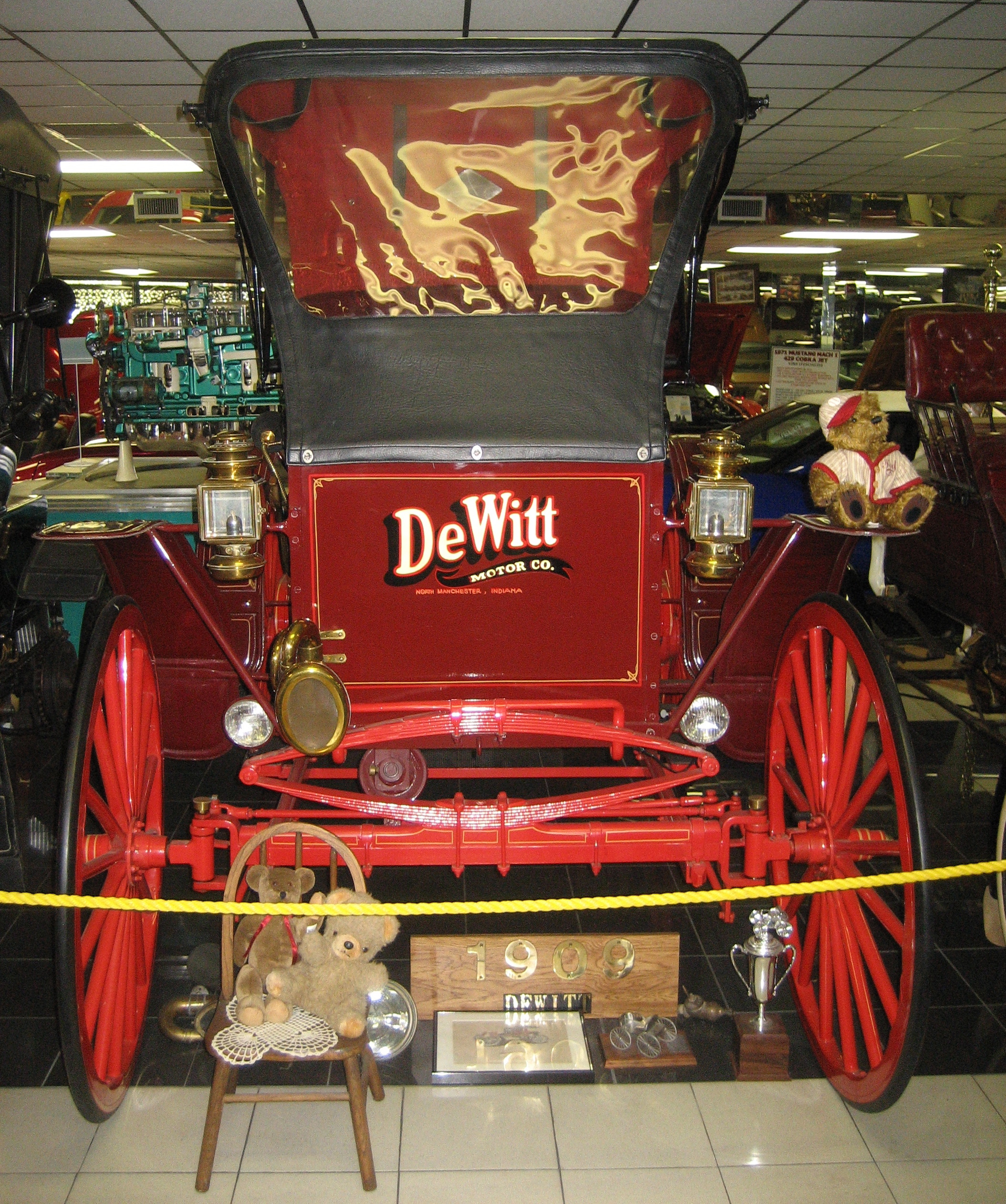
- 1909 DeWitt
- Industry: Automotive
- Founded: August 28, 1908
- Founder: Virgil DeWitt
- Defunct: 1910
- Headquarters: North Manchester, Indiana, United States
- Area served: Indiana, United States

The DeWitt Motor Company was an American automobile manufacturer in North Manchester, Indiana from about 1908 through 1910.

The vehicles came in two models, a 2-seater runabout and a 2-seater light truck. Both were high wheelers which resembled standard buggies of the era, and were powered by a simple 2-cylinder opposed air-cooled engine.

The company was started by and named after Virgil DeWitt, a Swedish immigrant to the United States.
