= Fuller (automobile) =

Defunct American motor vehicle manufacturer

At least two different cars have been offered with the marque of Fuller, one in Nebraska and one in Michigan.

== Nebraska car ==
From 1907 to 1910, Angus, Nebraska was the home of the Angus Automobile Company, employing forty craftsmen that produced over 600 Fuller cars in its short life. Only one car is known to have survived the scrap metal drives of WW II.

The car was designed by Charles M. Fuller. Fuller left Angus in 1902 to work for the St. Louis Motor Company and afterwards for the Buckeye Manufacturing Company of Anderson, Indiana, where he was instrumental in building the Lambert car. Fuller returned home to Angus with two Lambert cars. The townspeople were so impressed by the car and by Fuller's confidence that he could build a better car that they raised $50,000 by investing in $10 shares of the company's stock. Production of the first Fuller car started on February 16, 1907.

There were four models of the Fuller car that sold for $1000 to $3500. The best seller was a five-seater touring car that sold for $2,500. Unlike preliminary cars before full production commenced, the Fuller for sale in 1908 had a 4-cylinder engine. For 1908 only, there was also a bigger 6-cylinder car available. The Fuller car used only genuine leather upholstery, had sixteen to eighteen coats of paint, and the best engine then available. Its brass needed to be cleaned frequently, and owners noted that when cleaned, the car shined "bright as gold in the sun."

Unfortunately the success of the Fuller car was short-lived. In 1908 a demonstration was held at the Nuckolls County Fair in which a Fuller car completed two laps of the fairgrounds racetrack in sixty seconds, averaging sixty miles per hour. The performance was so exceptional that a group of Omaha businessmen offered to buy the Angus Automobile Company. Charles Fuller wanted to accept the offer, but the other stockholders did not. The resulting dispute resulted in Fuller's decision to sever all ties with the company. Without his inventive ability and drive, the business did not long survive. Majority stock ownership of the company had early on been bought by residents of nearby Nelson. These stockholders decided in 1910 to move the company to Nelson, but no cars were produced after the move.

== Michigan car ==
From 1909 to 1910, there was another Fuller automobile produced, this one in Jackson, Michigan. This car was started by George A. Matthews, one of the directors of the Jackson Automobile Company. There were two models available, a double-chain drive high wheeler, and a shaft drive standard wheel car. Both models featured full-elliptic springs. The reason for the car was simply that Matthews wanted his Fuller Buggy Company to make an automobile. Since there was not any more sound reason for the car than this, it did not last long and was absorbed by the Jackson Automobile Company in 1911. After this, the high wheeler was discontinued and the parts that were left for the standard car were used on the Jackson assembly line.
