= International Harvester Auto-Buggy =

Early 1900s American automobile

The International Harvester Auto-Buggy is a two-cylinder, air-cooled motor car made by International Harvester Corporation. First announced in February 1907, the Auto-Buggy was dropped from their range of products in early 1912, but the Auto Wagon continued to 1917.

== Auto Buggy ==
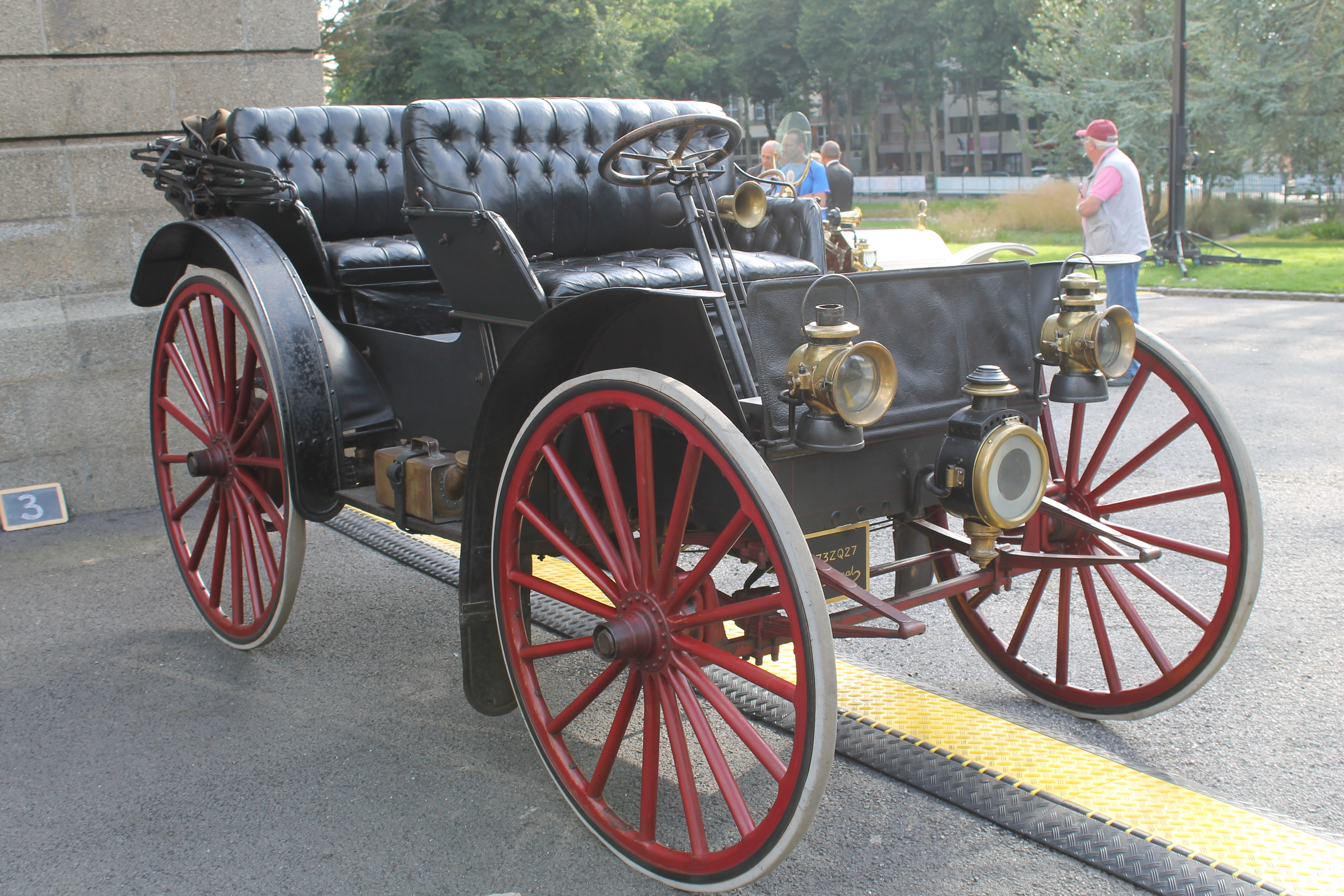
Auto-Buggy

Supplied with a pair of bench seats to carry four passengers, it was powered by an engine set beneath the car's body, a two-cylinder, horizontally opposed, air cooled design that produced 18-20 horsepower. It had two forward gears and one reverse gear with a chain-drive system to the large "high-wheel", wagon-style, rubber-shod wheels at the back. Its high wheels and wide stance gave it the stability and ground clearance to cope with poor roads. Accessories such as a canvas top were optional.

Buyers found it tough and reliable. The many widespread International Harvester dealers made service easy to find.

The Buggy was considered a car, so in 1912, when IHC decided to market just trucks, it was dropped.

== Auto Wagon ==
Late in 1908, a variant was announced with a single bench seat mounted on a well-sided tray in place of the Buggy's automobile-styled body. A second bench seat could be mounted on the Wagon's tray, still leaving a very short tray available behind it. IHC's first true truck, it was tagged their Model A from 1908 to 1911. A wide-track version was tagged Model B. Auto Wagon sales in 1909 led the emerging light-truck market.

In fact, the Wagon had the same chassis and the Wagon seat and tray combination could be put straight onto a Buggy chassis.

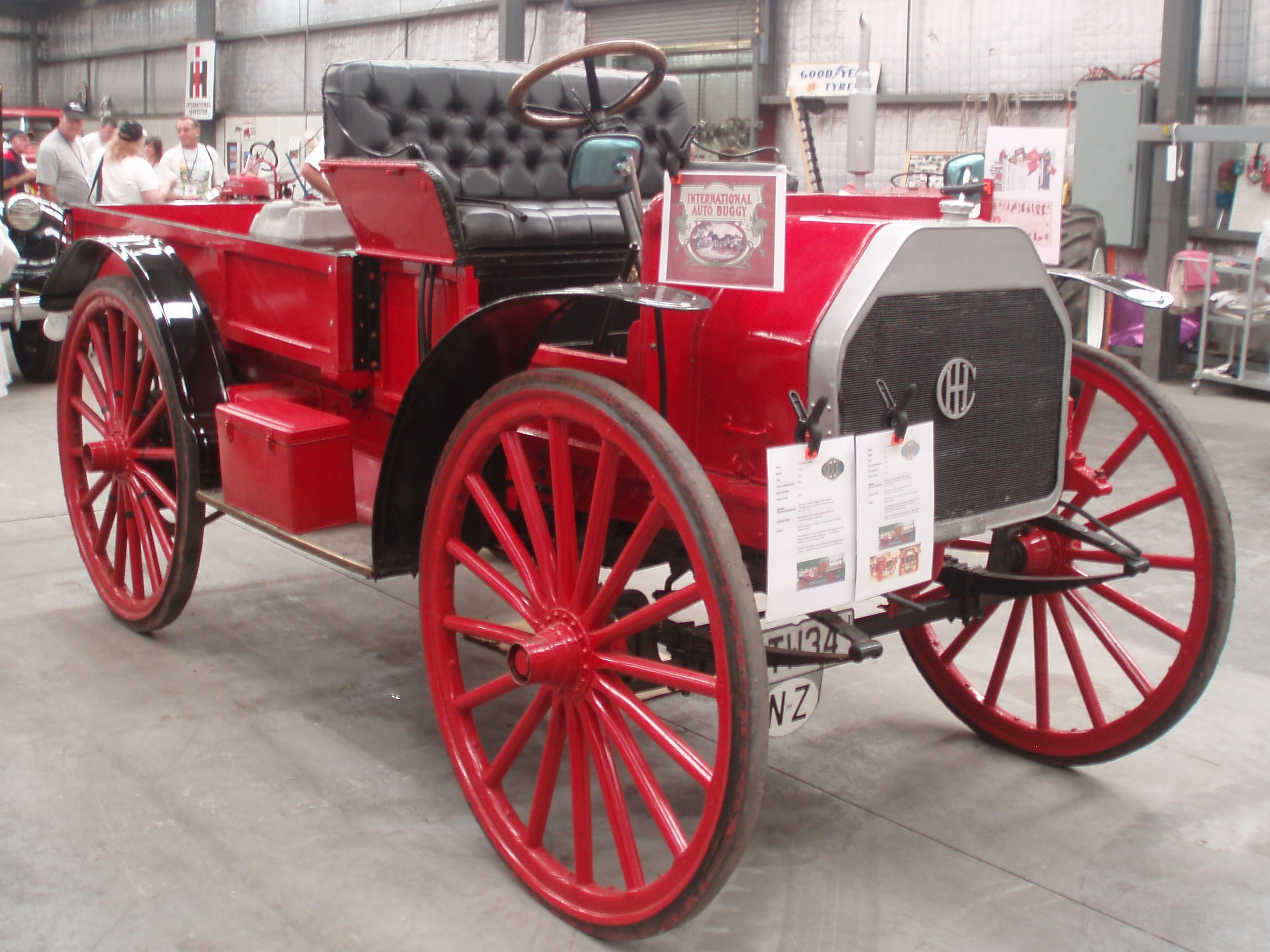
Auto Wagon

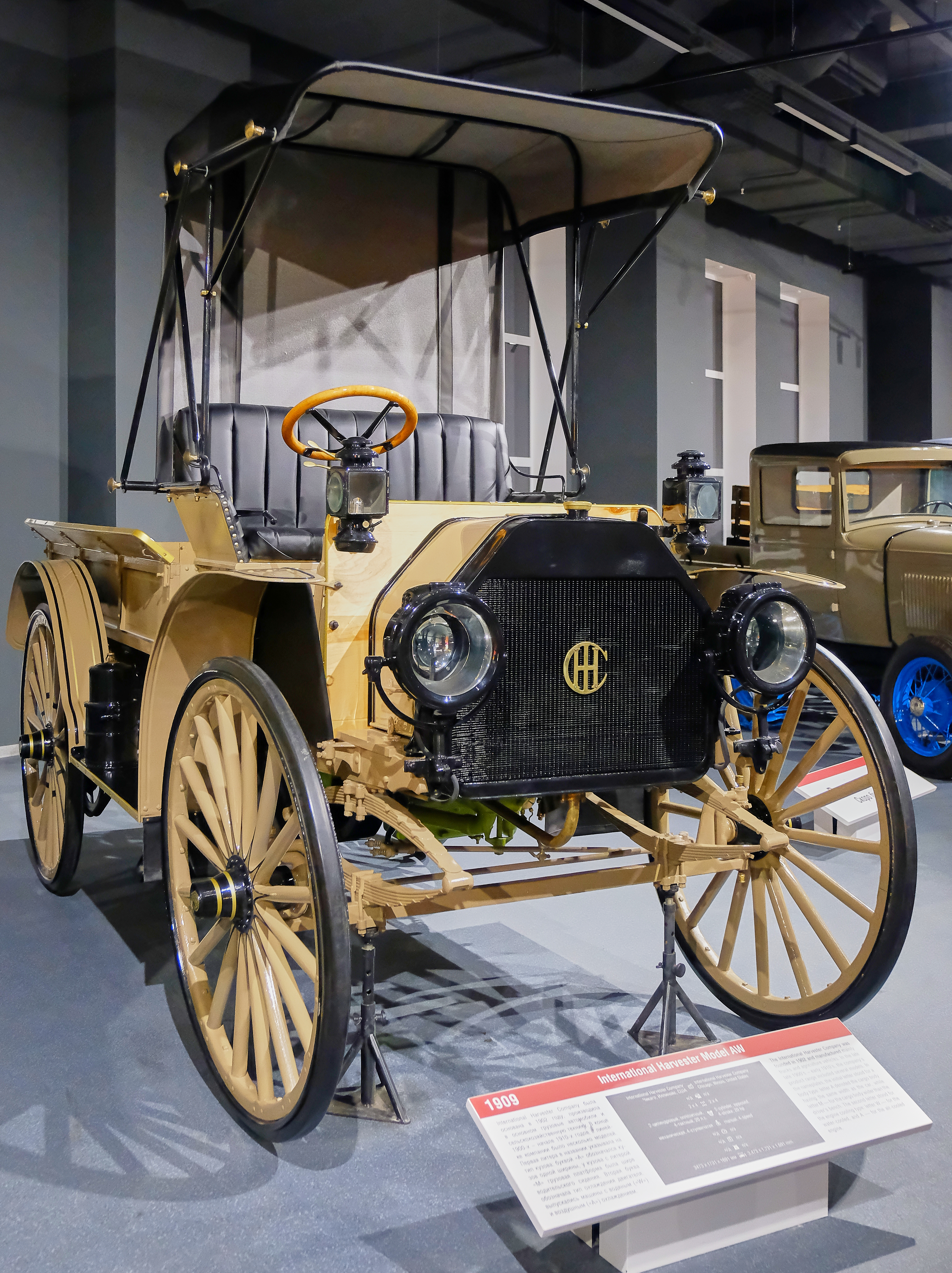
1909 Auto Wagon Model AW (water-cooled)

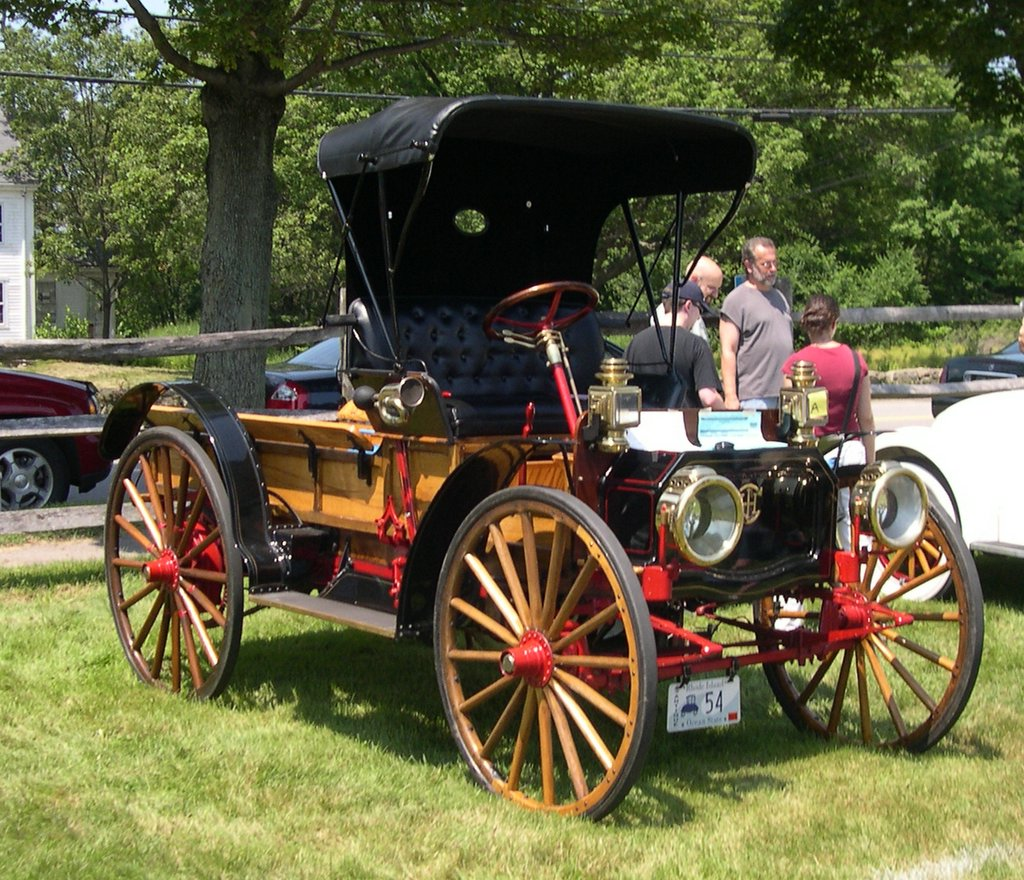
Auto Wagon with tray one bench seat and hood

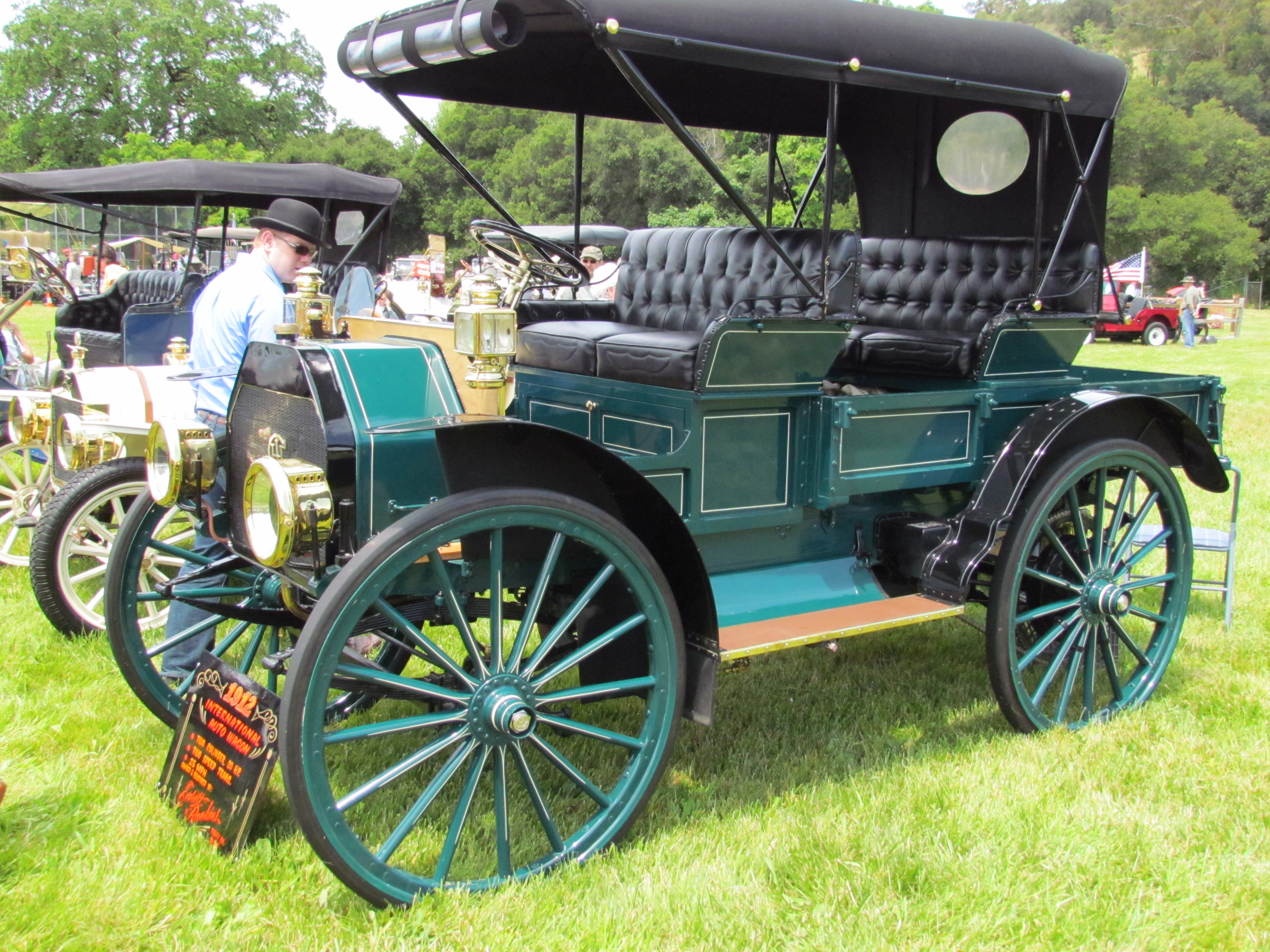
A 1912 Auto Wagon two bench seats and tray

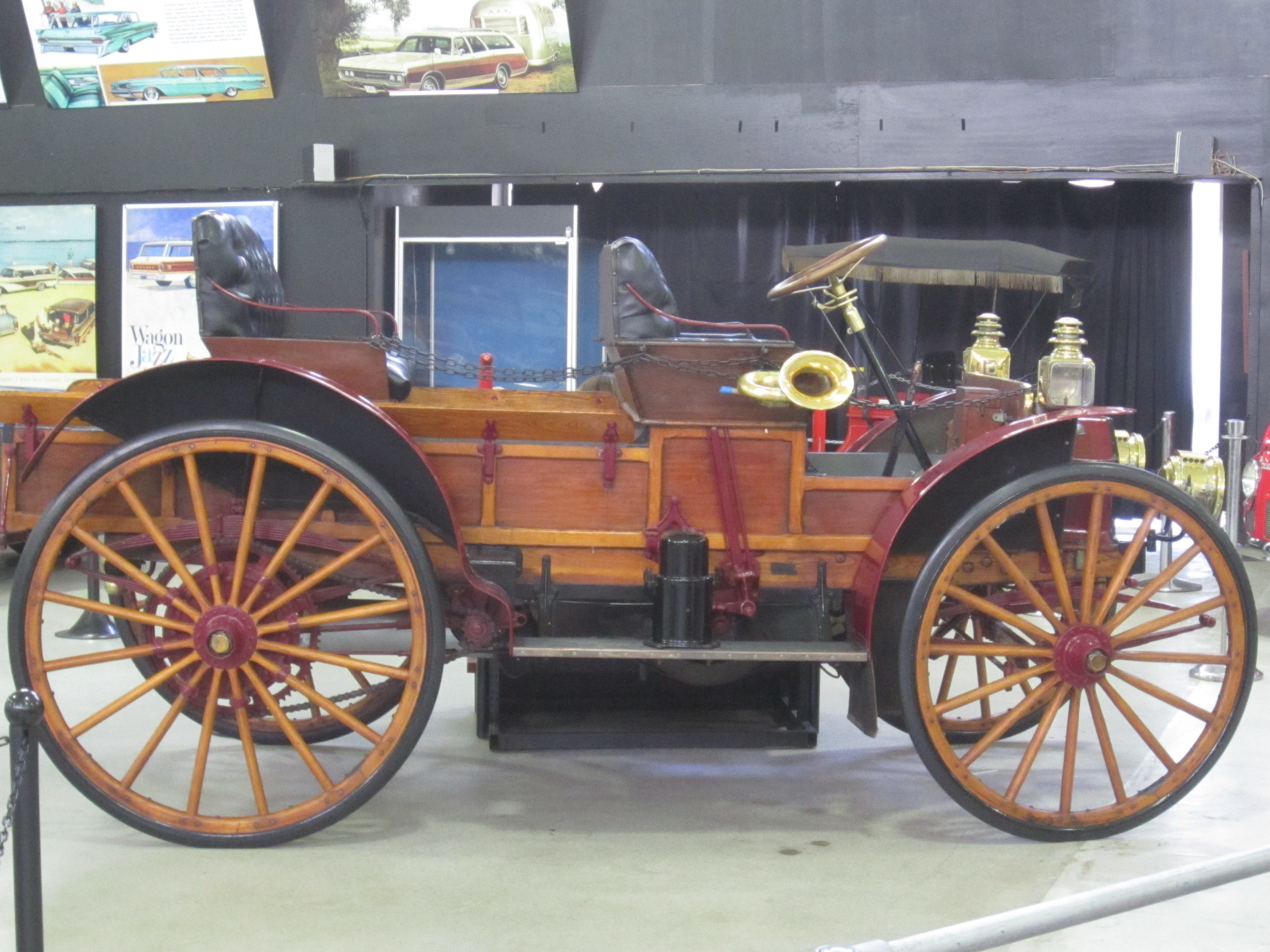
Auto Wagon two bench seats and short tray

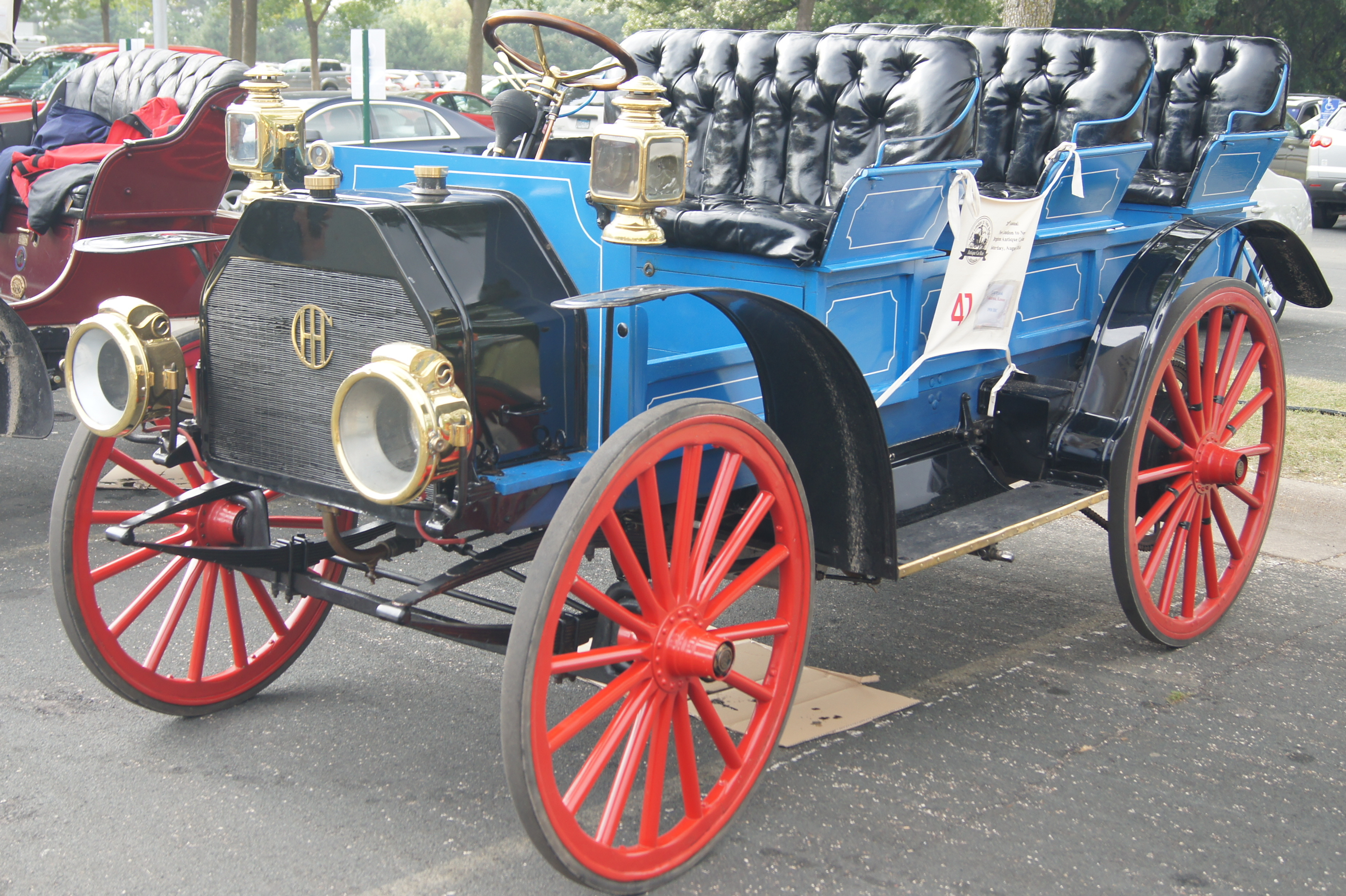
Auto Wagon with three bench seats

1907 to 1911 Model AA (air-cooled)
1907 to 1911 Model AW (water-cooled)
1912 to 1917 Model MA (air-cooled) load 800 lbs
or Model MW (water-cooled)
or Model MAX (air-cooled and wide-track)

The range of bodies available included pickup, delivery, stake-type, panel delivery, and bus. Some became fire trucks.

Pneumatic tires became an option.

1915 to 1917 Model M ½-ton load 1000 lbs
1915 to 1917 Model E ¾-ton load 1500 lbs

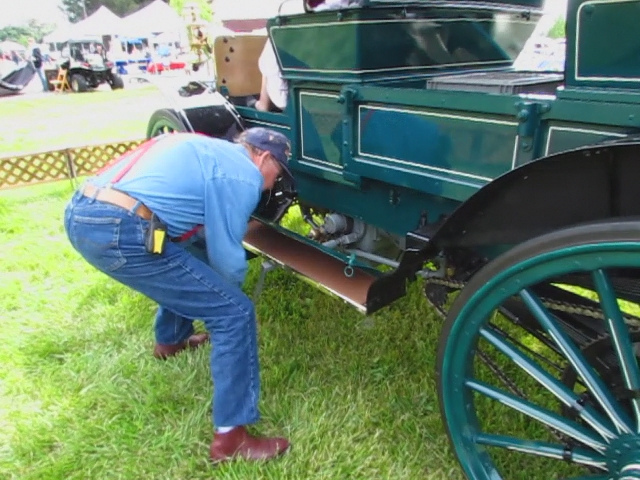
1912 Auto Wagon cranking

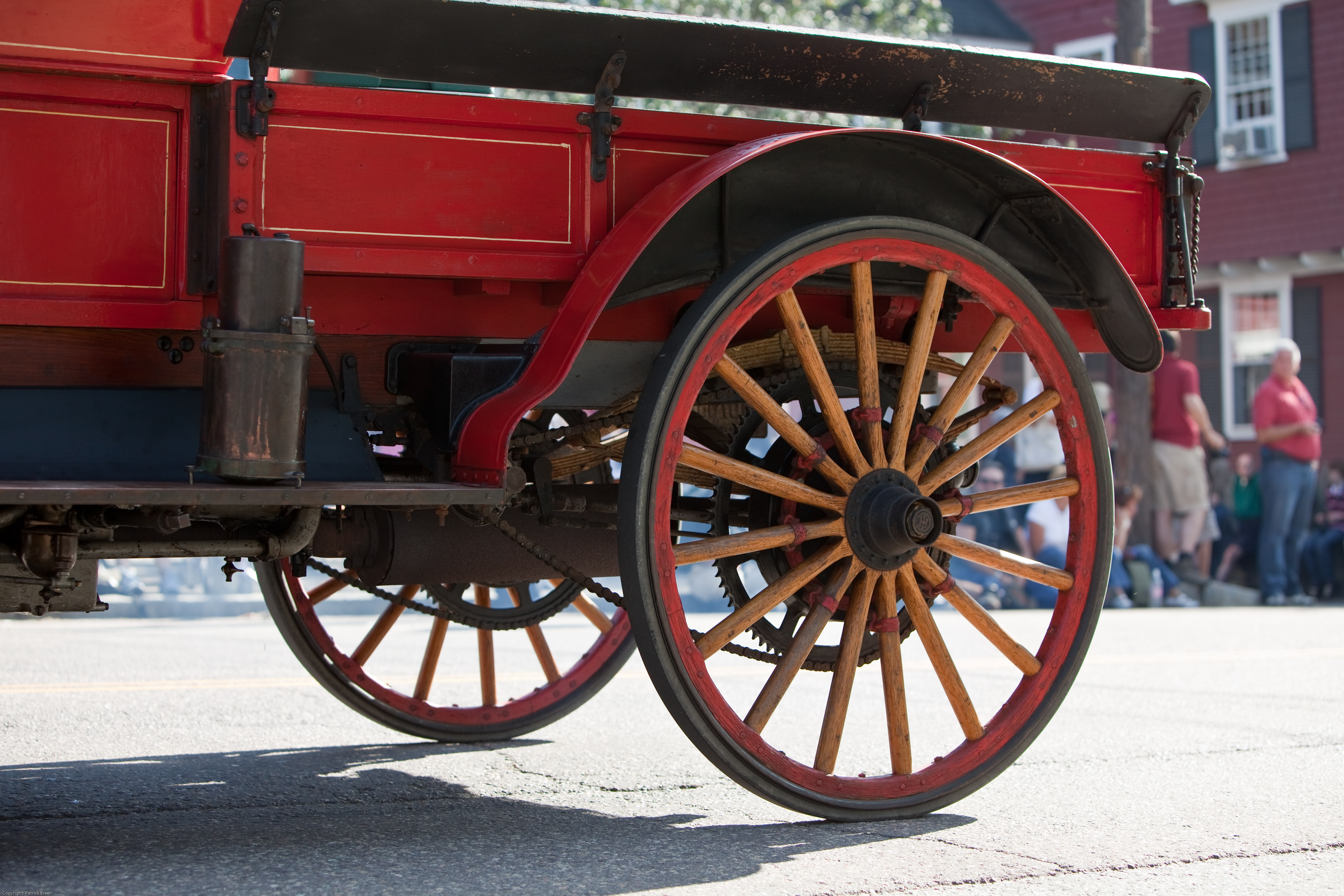
Chain drive

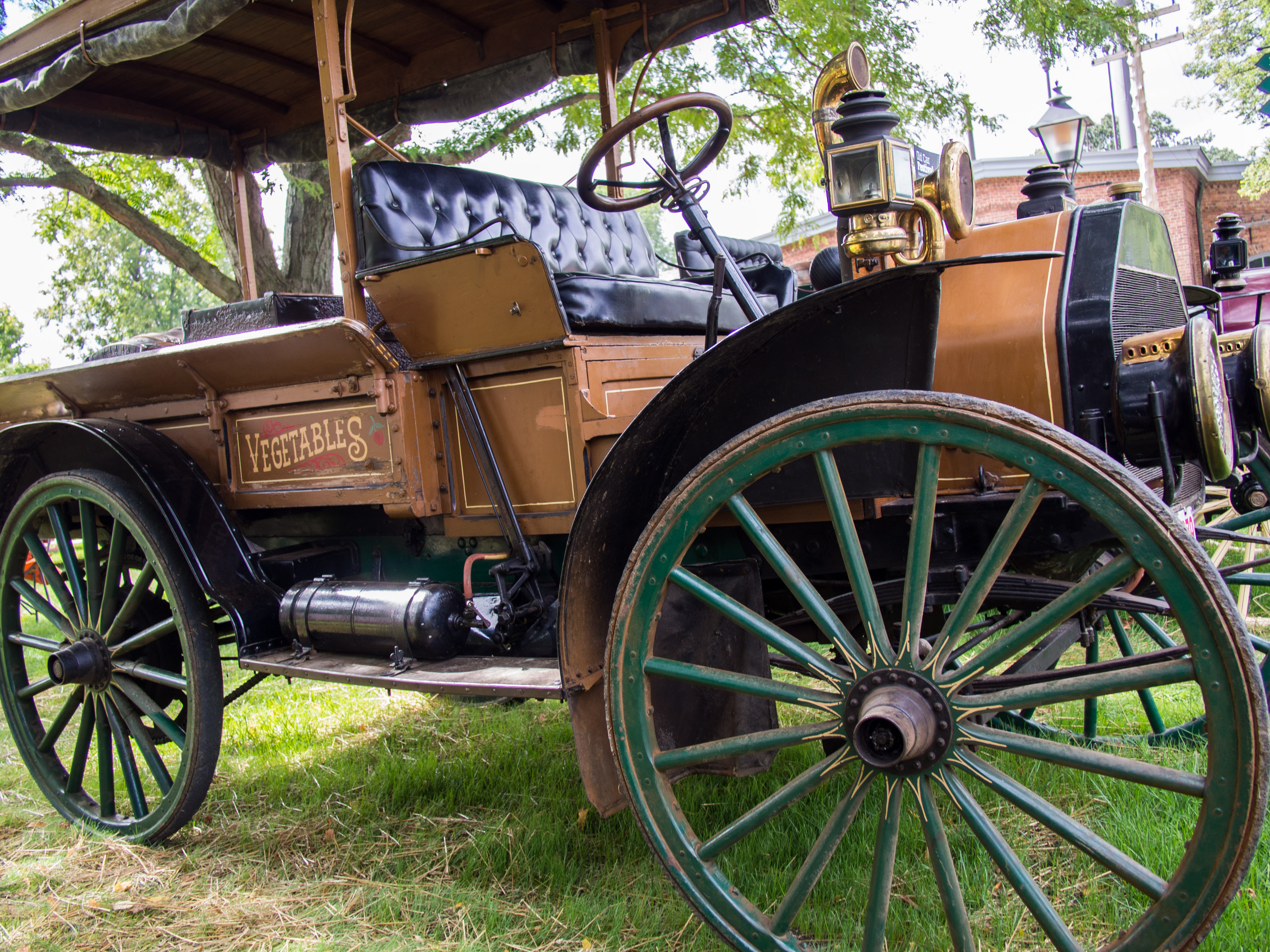
1914 MW

== Replaced by Model F ==
Announced in 1915, full production of the Auto Wagon replacement began in 1917. Quite different in appearance, it had a sloping "coffin-nose", and more importantly, it was a water-cooled four-cylinder without chain drive, and it had low wheels and either solid or pneumatic tires.

== See also ==
- High wheeler
