= Lincoln Motor Car Works =

American motor vehicle manufacturer, 1908–1913

Lincoln Motor Works
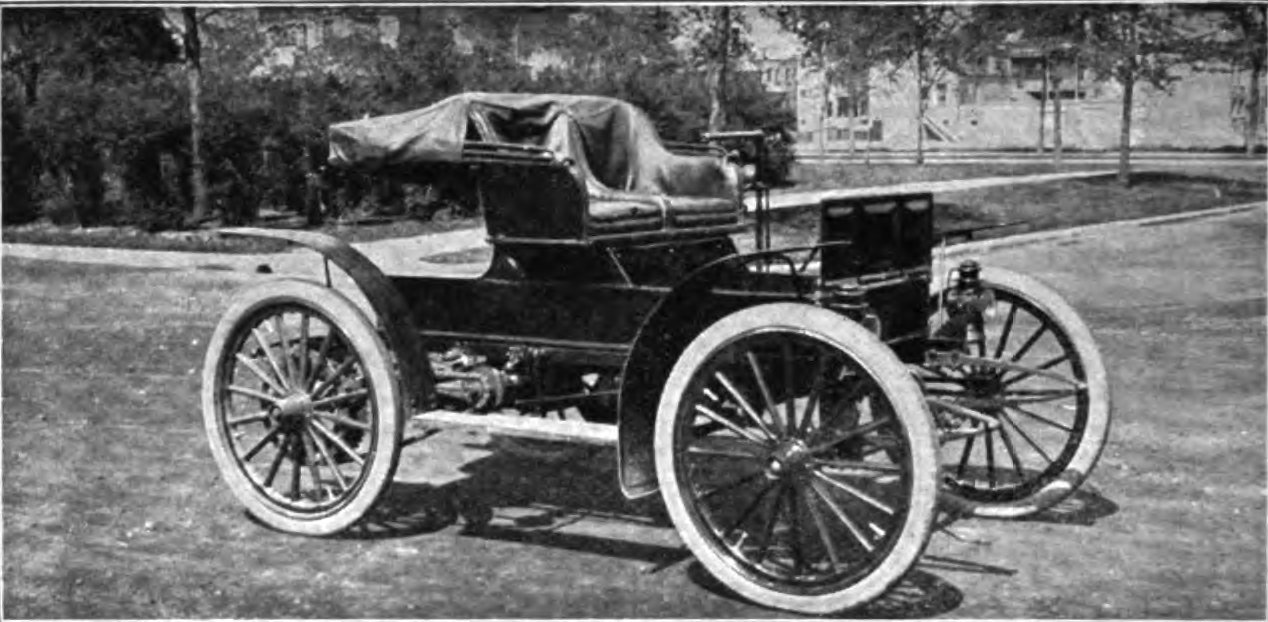
- Sears Model L

Overview
- Also called: Sears Model L, Lincoln Model 24
- Model years: 1908-1913

Lincoln Motor Car Works was an automobile company in Chicago, Illinois. It produced cars for Sears Roebuck from 1908 until 1912.

== History ==
Lincoln Motor Car Works built a high-wheeler brass era automobile that was sold through the Sears Catalog. In 1912 the Sears arrangement ended and Lincoln sold the identical car as the Lincoln Model 24 Runabout. For 1913 Lincoln offered a Light Touring car, however production ended later that year.

== Models ==
Nine models were offered, priced between US$325 and $475, with the Model L advertised at $495 complete. They were sold by mail, out of the Sears catalog. Sears had a very lenient return policy: cars were sold on a ten-day trial basis.

The cars had an air-cooled, two-cylinder, horizontally opposed engine, similar to that later used on BMW motorcycles. The engine was located under the floorboards, beneath the driver’s feet, and started from a hand crank in the front. Early cars were rated at 10 hp, and later models developed 14 hp. At least one of the engines used was a Reeves Model P.

In the interest of simplicity, all models used a friction-drive transmission. A roller (a metal wheel with a rubber surface vulcanized to increase its grip) on the front sprocket shaft was pressed against the machined rear surface of the engine flywheel, thus driving the sprocket shaft, the drive chains and the rear wheels. Moving the shift lever set the drive roller to various positions on the flywheel, either nearer the center or nearer the edge, effectively changing the "gear ratio" for climbing hills or driving on level roads. Moving the roller past the center point spun it backwards to give reverse gear. The front sprocket drive shaft was free to slide forward and backwards slightly, just enough to allow the roller to move away from the flywheel. The "clutch pedal" worked differently from most other cars, in that the operator had to hold their foot on the pedal to keep the roller pressed against the flywheel (the catalog claimed that the weight of the operator’s foot was sufficient to provide forward motion). Removing the foot from the pedal allowed the roller to spring back from the flywheel, effectively providing "neutral" so the car could be cranked without moving forwards.

The engine was lubricated by an "oiler", which was attached to the engine via a spring belt from the main crankshaft. It had four adjustable drip feeds with separate lines to the engine bearings and other areas. All components of the transmission were exposed, so several bearings and pivots had to be oiled or greased manually from time to time.

A form of differential action was obtained by building each front drive sprocket with a two-way clutch. These clutches engaged when the shaft upon which they were mounted turned in either direction, but disengaged when the wheel turned them faster than the shaft. When driven in a straight line, both clutches would engage, and provide power to both rear wheels. When the car went around a corner, the outside wheel turned slightly faster than the inside wheel, disengaging the sprocket for the outside wheel, and propelling the car with the inside wheel only. On slippery roads, such as in deep mud, snow, or sand, if one wheel lost traction the other wheel would continue to pull, allowing the car the continue moving until either both wheels found traction once more, or both wheels lost traction completely. Because the cars were very light weight, they were capable of being driven through mud or snow which would immobilize heavier cars with conventional differentials.

Although not a bad car for its type, the design of the cars was more representative of cars from the period 1900-1905, and even some experimental models from the 1890s. Motor buggys were already becoming somewhat unfashionable during the period when they were sold by Sears (1908–1912). By that time, the market had mostly moved toward cars with more powerful engines and the ability to be driven comfortably at a higher speed. The catalog claimed a top speed of 25 mph for the Motor Buggy, which would have meant a comfortable cruising speed of 15 mph or so. Many competing cars of the period, such as the early Ford Model T, Buick, Maxwell, Franklin, and others were capable of top speeds of 45 mph or more, with cruising speeds equal to or greater than the 25 mph top speed of the Motor Buggy.

== Other uses ==
Because of the obsolete styling (for the period of its manufacture), a Sears Motor Buggy was chosen to portray the home-built experimental car constructed by automobile inventor Joe Belden (Red Skelton) in the 1951 film, "Excuse My Dust". The film was set in the 1890s, and features several other early cars, including a Curved-Dash Oldsmobile. In the film, the Sears shows itself to be capable of running well on smooth roads, through deep water, and through pumpkin patches.

The company is not related to the current Lincoln Motor Company luxury car brand owned by Ford Motor Company, which was founded by Henry M. Leland in 1917, two years after Sears stopped selling cars.
