= Holsman Automobile Company =

Defunct American motor vehicle manufacturer

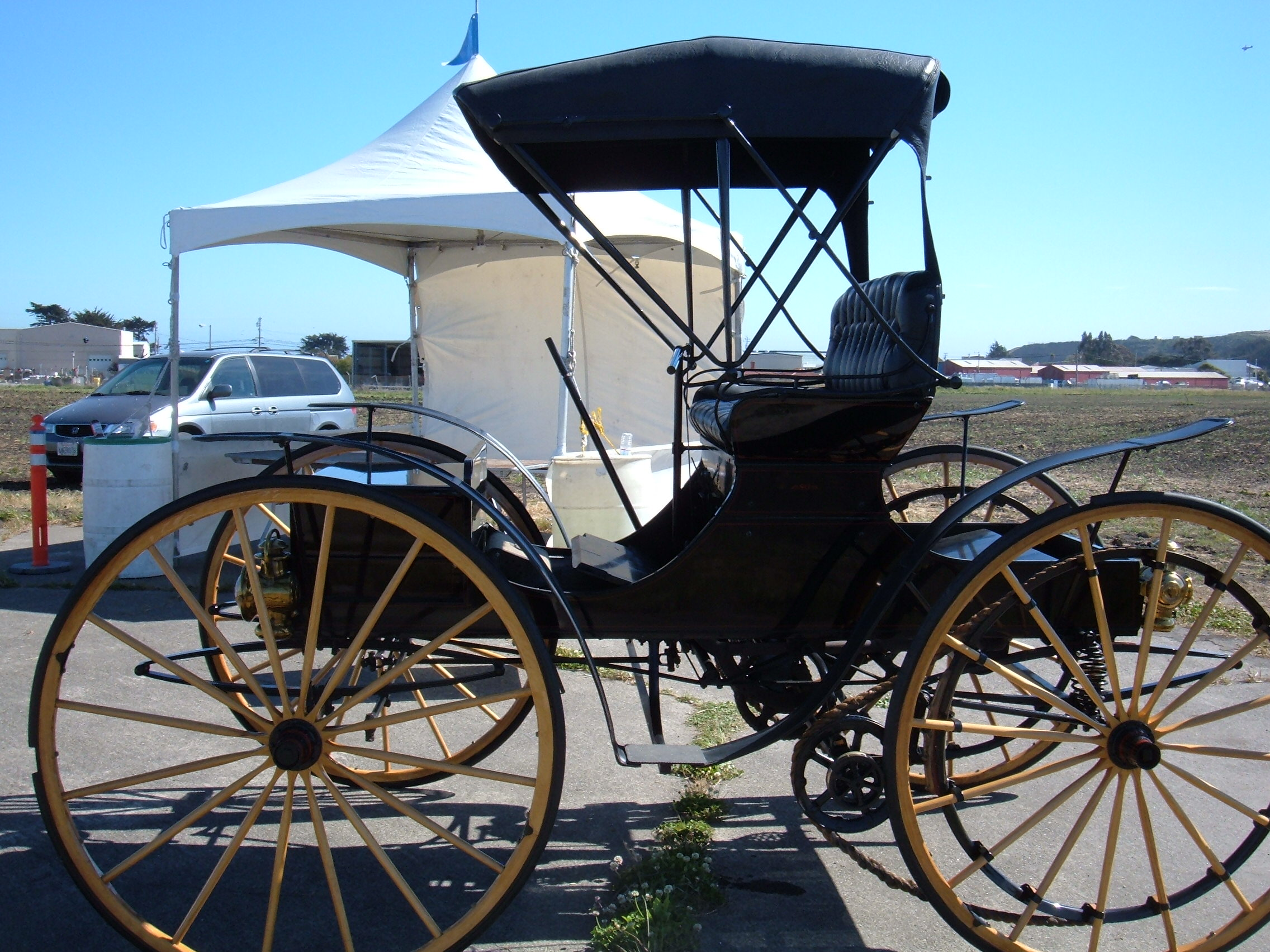

Overview
- Manufacturer: Holsman Automobile Company
- Production: 1901–1910

Body and chassis
- Body style: High wheeler

Powertrain
- Transmission: Rope drive

The Holsman Automobile Company was an early American automobile manufacturer in Chicago, Illinois, between 1901 and 1910. Founded by Henry K. Holsman, the company produced a high wheeler automobile.

Built by Henry K Holsman and HC Bryan, the Holsman was the first commercially successful highwheeler, which encouraged many other Midwest manufacturers to start highwheeler production in the first decade of the twentieth century.

The Holsman was a very simple design - unfortunately this resulted in the company's demise. Unlike other companies, who added pneumatic-tired standard models, Holsman stuck faithfully to highwheeler production only until the company folded in 1910.

He then relocated 50 miles west to Plano, Illinois and produced a Holsman look-a-like called the Independent Harvester, which only lasted until 1911.

== Gallery ==
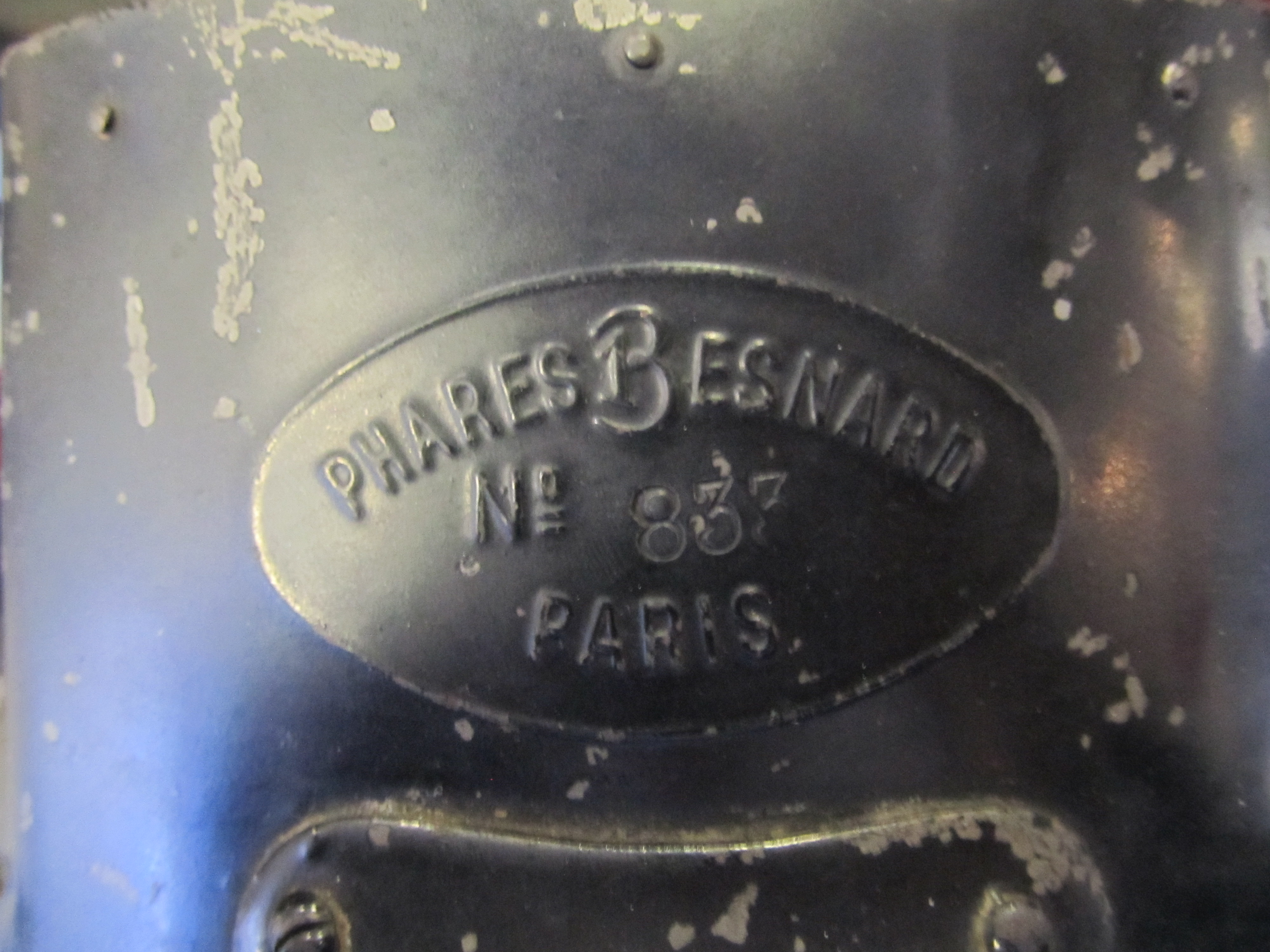
Nameplate of phare (left headlamp) Besnard № 833 Paris (1908 model)

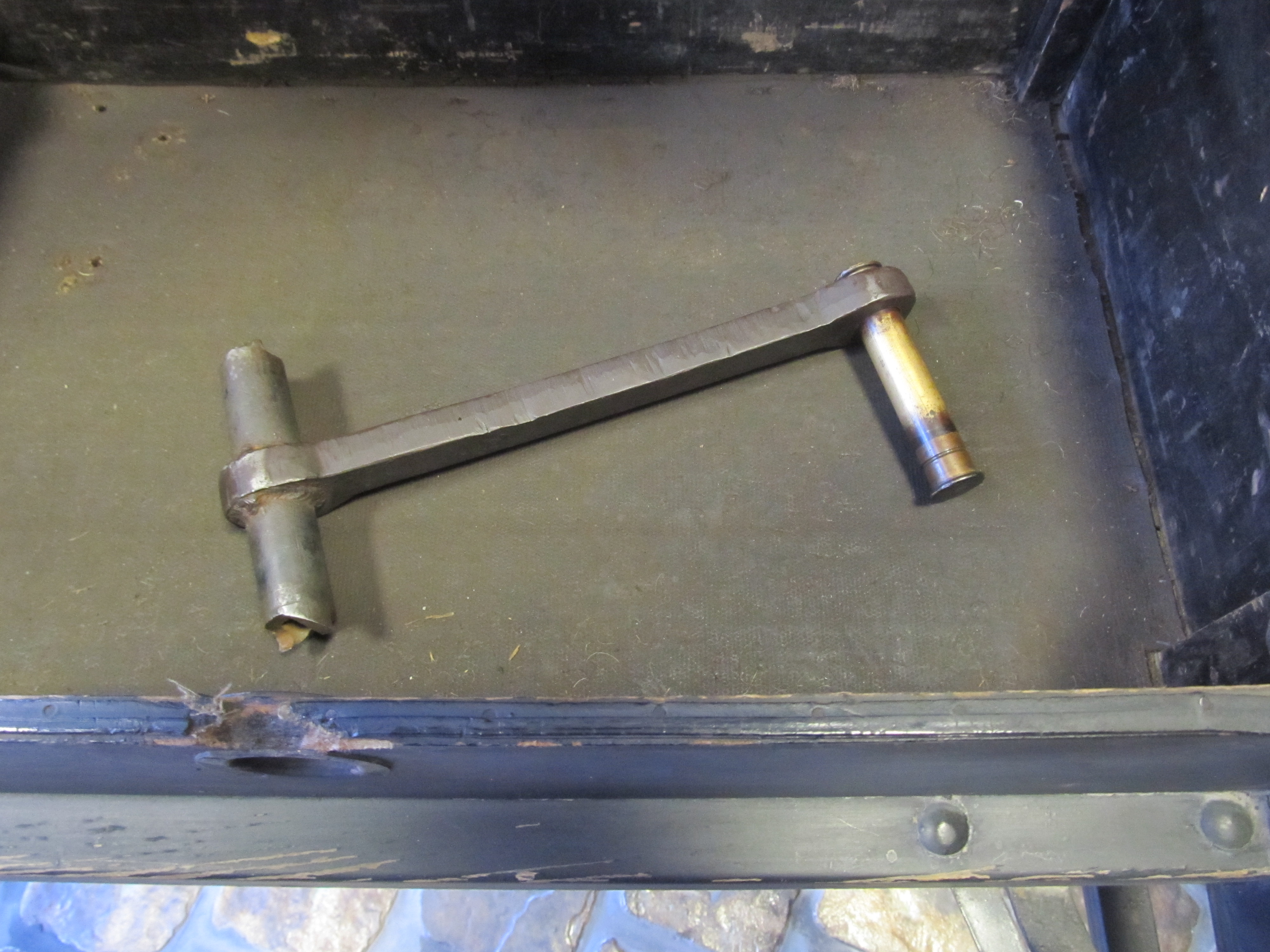
Starter crank (1908 model)

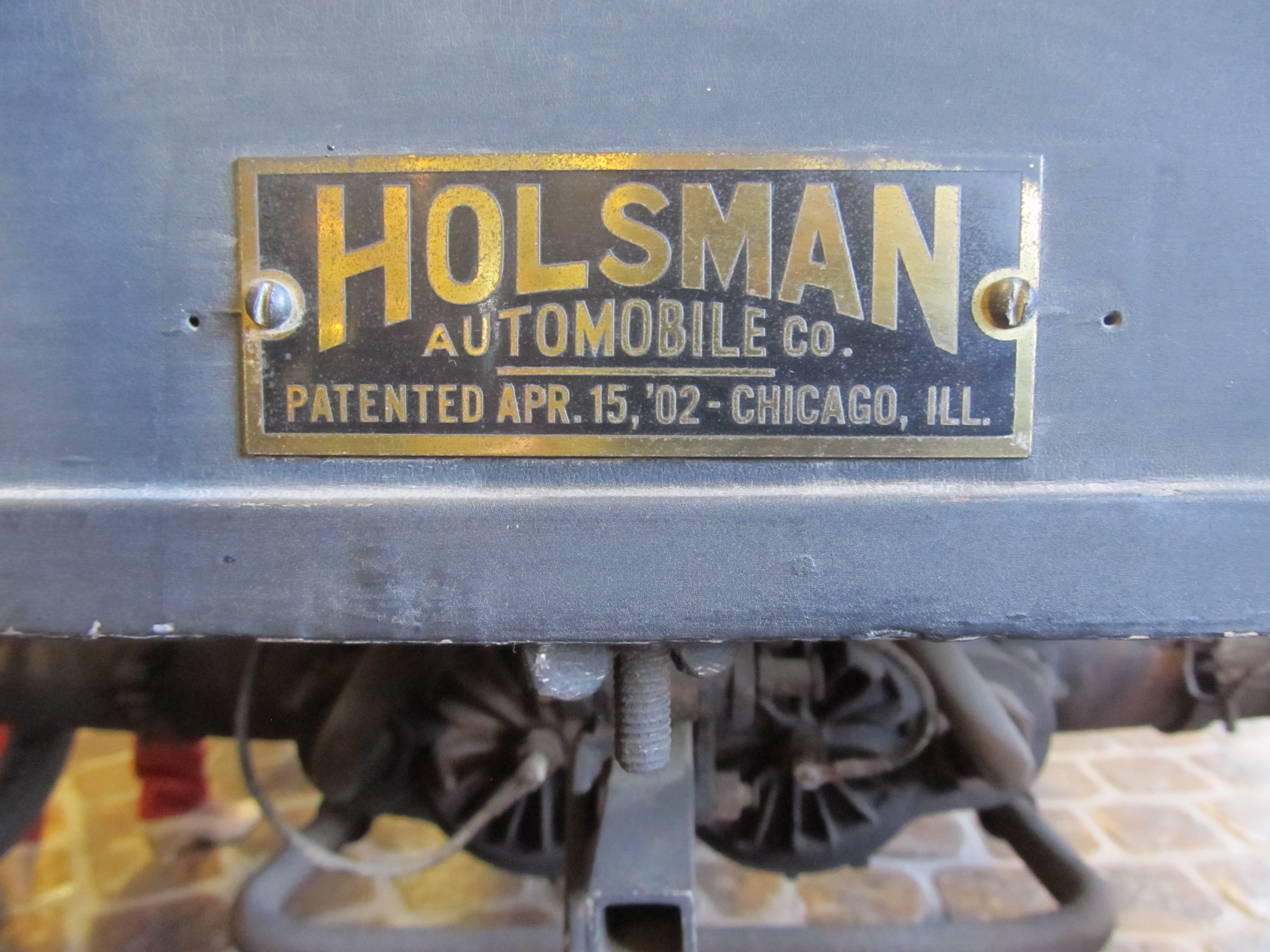
Nameplate (1908 model)

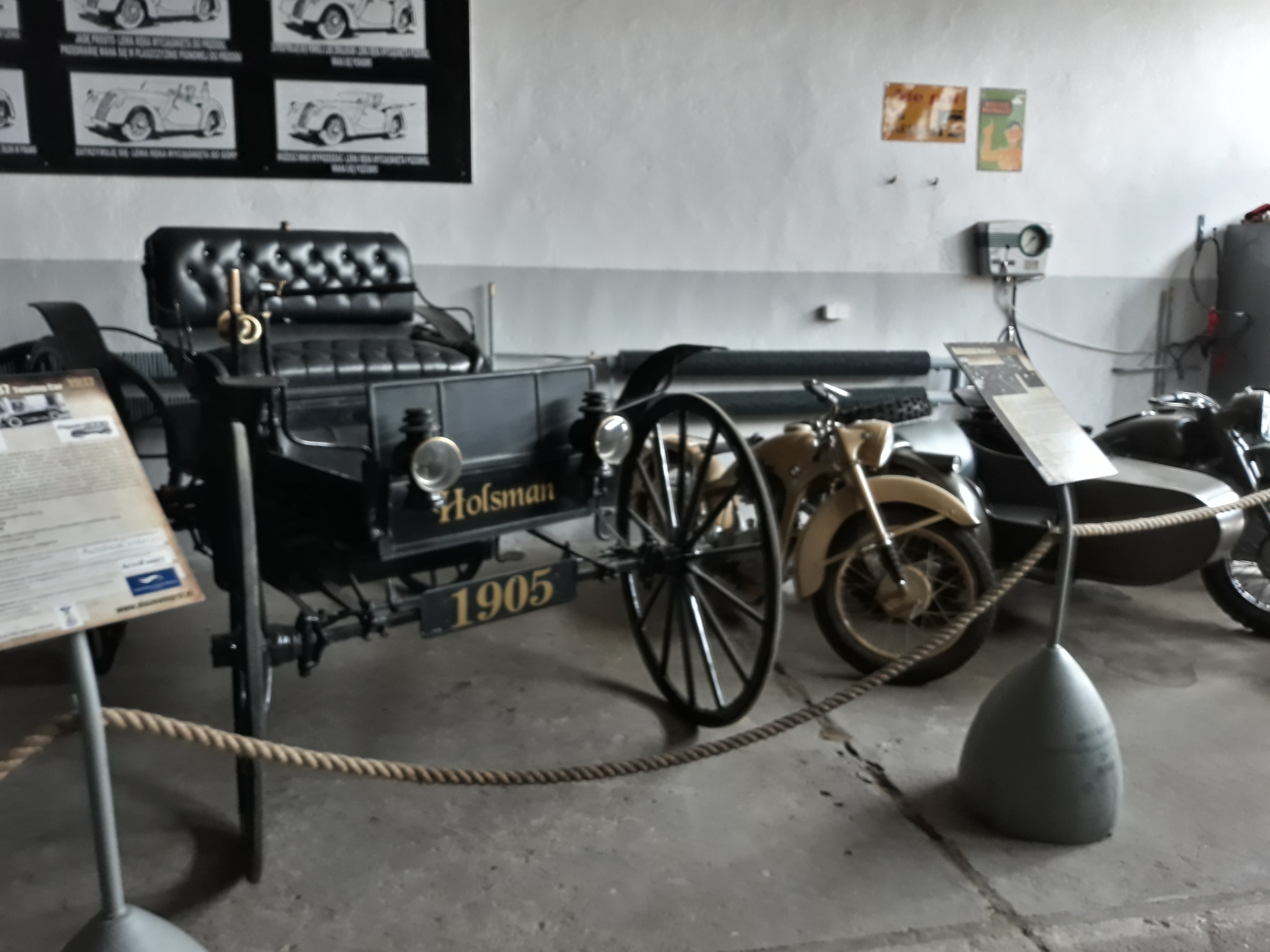
Holsman model 3, 1905, Muzeum Gryf, Poland

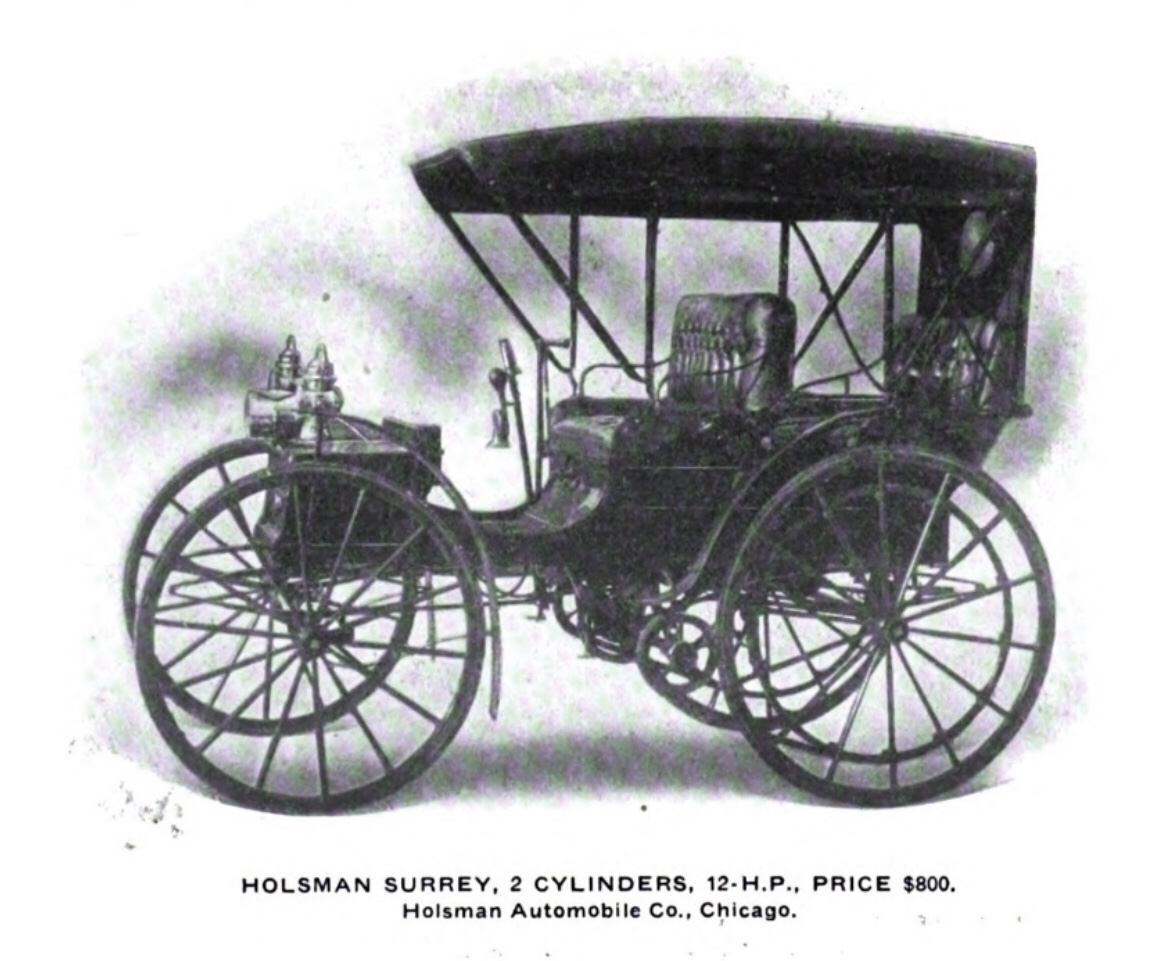
Holsman Surrey (1908)

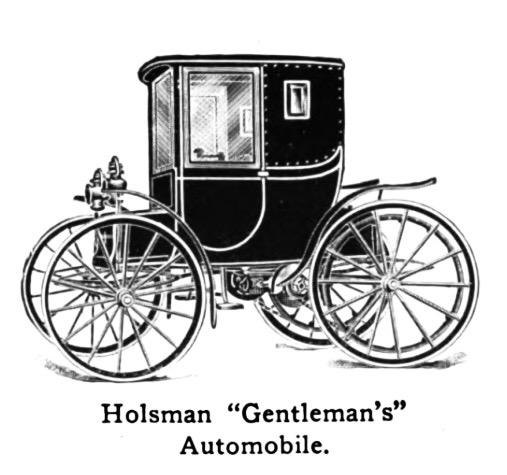
Holsman (1908)

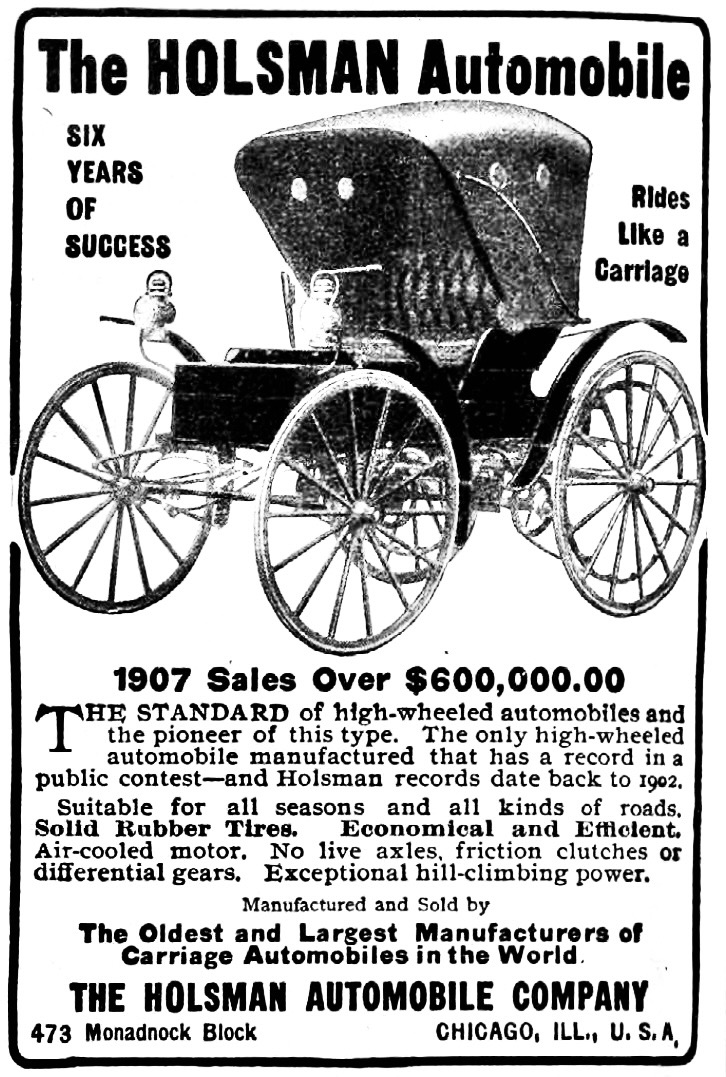
Holsman Automobile (1908)

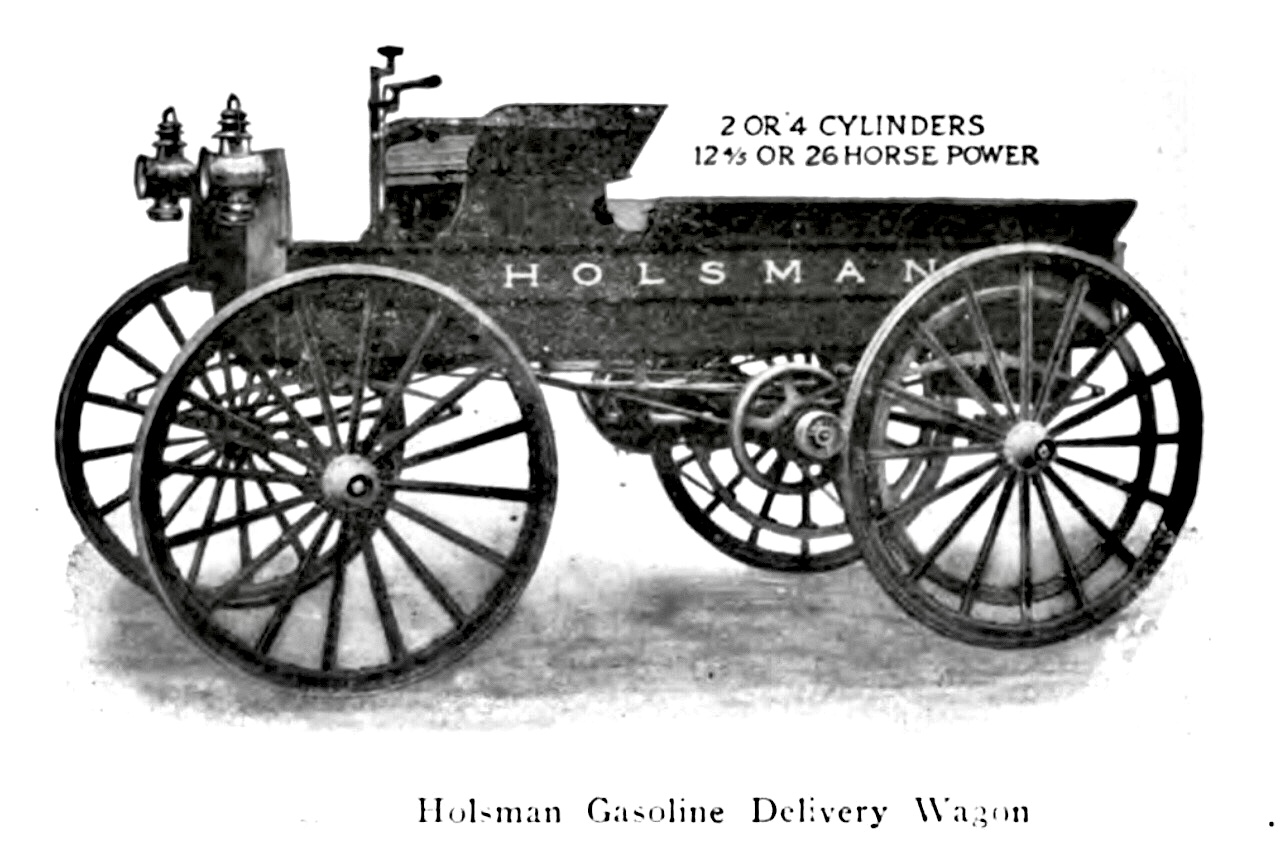
Holsman Delivery Wagon (1909)
