= Single Center =

Former American automobile manufacturer

Single Center Spring Buggy Company Evansville Automobile Company
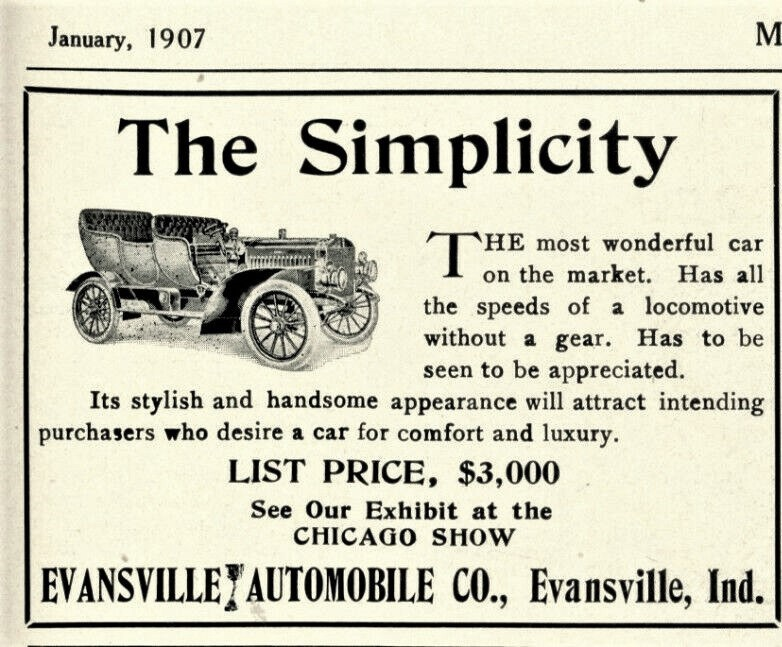
- Simplicity advertisement built at the Single Center Spring Buggy Company

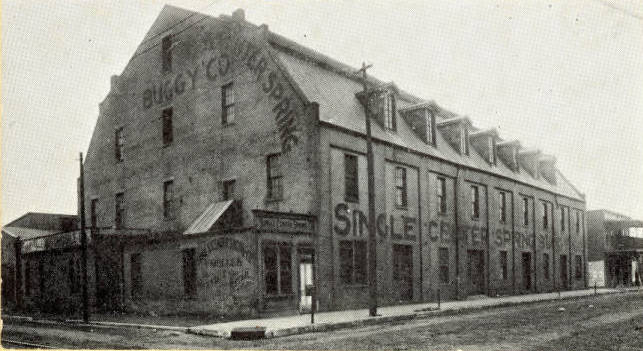
- The Single Center factory in Evansville
- Formerly: Single Center Spring Buggy Company
- Industry: Automotive
- Founded: 1886; 140 years ago
- Founders: Willis Copeland, Thomas B. Jones and |J. O. St. John
- Defunct: 1911
- Fate: Converted to Automobile Dealership
- Headquarters: Evansville, Indiana, United States
- Key people: Willis Copeland, W. O. Worth, Schuyler W. Zent, J. A. Windsor

Single Center Spring Buggy Company was an American carriage and automobile manufacturer based in Evansville, Indiana. The Single Center factory manufactured the Zentmobile, Zent, Windsor, Worth, Single Center, Evansville, Simplicity and Traveler automobiles from 1903 to 1910.

== History ==
The company was founded in 1886 as the Single Center Spring Buggy Company by Willis Copeland with partners Thomas B. Jones and J. O. St. John. Initially they manufactured springs but expanded into transmissions and carriages. Starting around the turn of the century they began manufacturing automobiles against the wishes of Jones and St. John who subsequently left the company. Single Center continued to build buggys alongside automobiles.

In 1911 Single Center ended automobile production and subsequently Willis Copeland became Evansville's first Chevrolet dealer.

=== Zent (1900–1902), Zentmobile (1903), Zent (1904–1906) ===
In 1900 at his machine shop in Marion, Ohio, Schuyler W. Zent built his first automobile. It was a gasoline runabout with single-cylinder 8 hp engine and single chain drive. In the two years following, he built and sold four more. He improved this model and in July 1902 he announced his plans to manufacture commercially. He could not find the financing necessary to do that in Marion, so he journeyed to Evansville, Indiana. His car was put into production by the Single Center Spring Buggy Company, as the Zentmobile in 1903.

Willis Copeland would manufacture the car, and all Zent had to worry about was selling it. This proved more difficult than Zent had hoped, and within the year the partnership had broken up.

Schuyler Zent returned to Ohio to build a new Zent in Bellefontaine. The new Zent was in production in early 1904. His new Zent was powered by a three-cylinder 18 hp engine mounted under the hood, and featured shaft drive. A twin and a four joined the line in 1906. Early in 1907 the Zent company became the Bellefontaine Automobile Company, and the car's name was changed to Traveler.

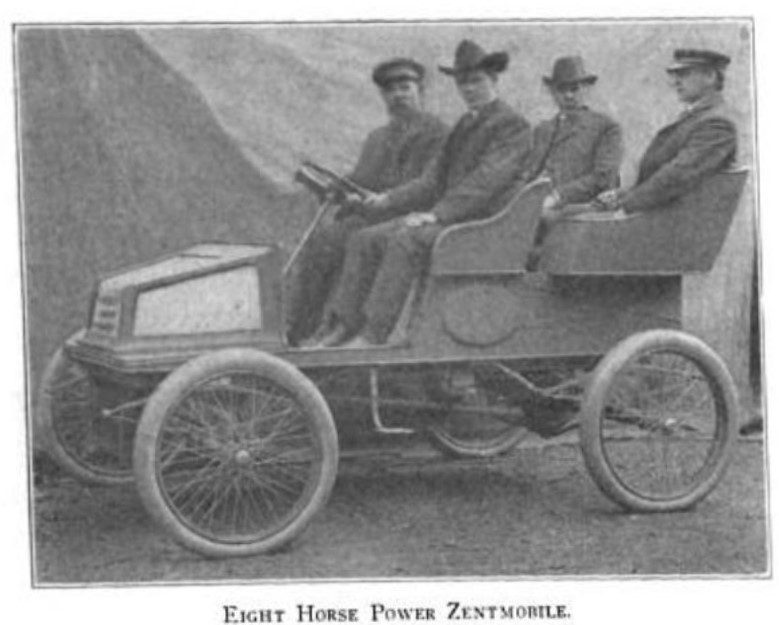
1903 Zentmobile in Horseless Age magazine

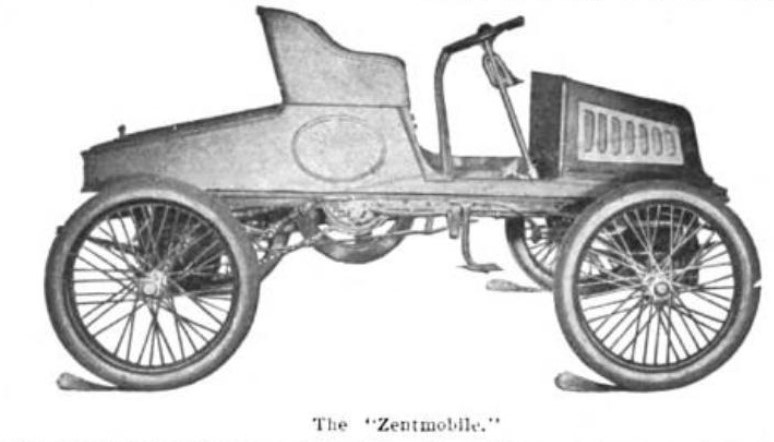
1904 Zentmobile in Cycle and Automobile Trade Journal

=== Windsor (1906) ===
J. A. Windsor incorporated the Windsor Automobile Company in his native Chicago in late 1905. He traveled to Evansville, Indiana to talk to Willis Copeland of the Single Center Buggy Company, who agreed to build the car for him. The Windsor was a four-cylinder 30-hp touring car with shaft drive and a friction-type transmission that Windsor preferred calling a “rolling traction drive." The friction drive was designed by Copeland's factory engineer William O. Worth.

Windsor had trouble selling his car at his $2,500 (equivalent to $89,583 in 2025) asking price. Unable to establish a viable sales organization, he was out of business within the year. The car was taken over by Willis Copeland who formed the Evansville Automobile Company and rebranded it as the Simplicity.

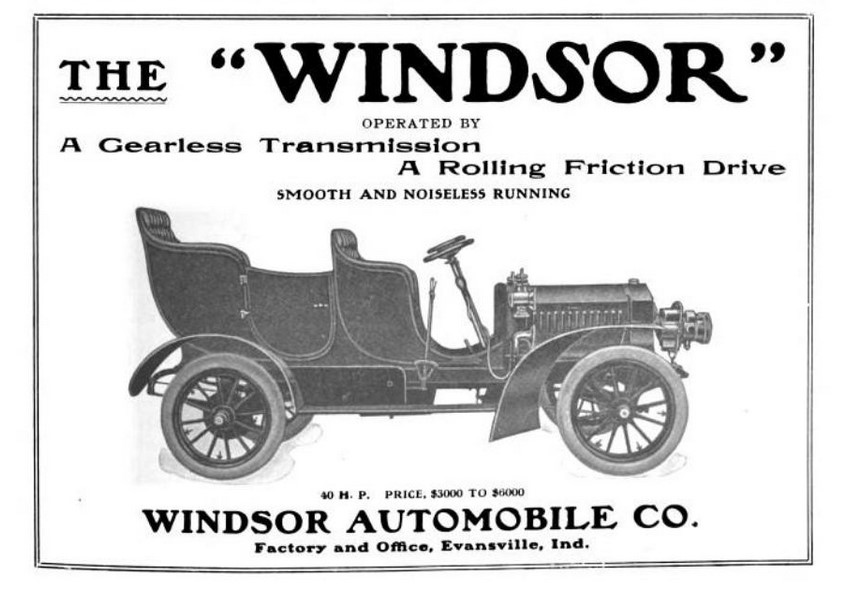
1906 Windsor advertisement in Motor Way

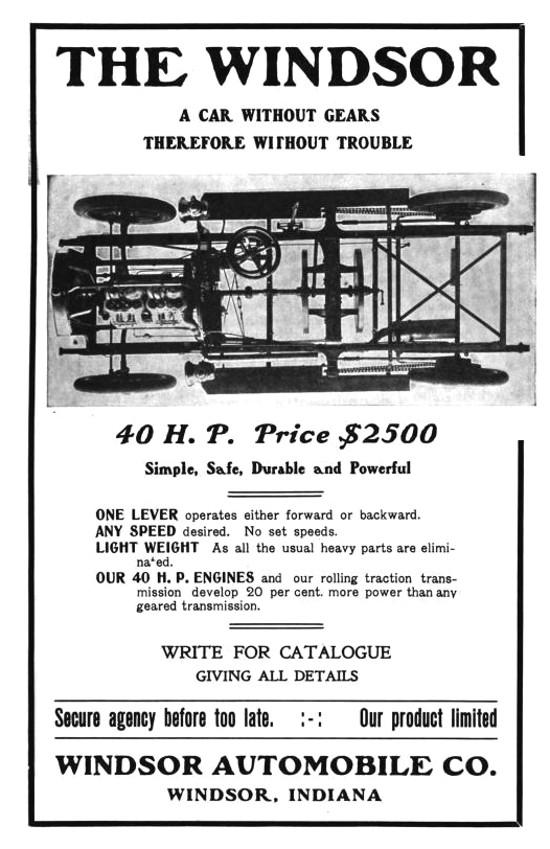
1906 Windsor advertisement in Cycle & Automobile Trade Journal

=== Worth (1906–1910) ===
William O. Worth was an engineer from the earliest days of horseless carriages. He designed the drivetrain for the Benton Harbor Motocycle built from 1894 to 1896 by the Baushke Bros. in Benton Harbor, Michigan. In 1906 now a New York City consulting engineer, Worth was brought to Evansville by Willis Copeland to get some fresh production expertise and help design the Windsor.

After the Windsor venture quickly failed, Worth designed a high-wheeler which he talked Copeland into building. It had an air-cooled two-cylinder engine, double chain drive, tiller steering, and the friction transmission used in the Windsor. This friction drive was originally devised by Worth for the Chicago built in the late 1890s in Harvey, Illinois.

When Willis Copeland suggested changes to it, Worth abruptly departed and formed the Worth Motor Car Manufacturing Company. Copeland would build the car as the Single Center. After only a few Worth cars were produced in Evansville, Worth moved to Kankakee and after being evicted from the first factory he leased for failing to pay the rent, he found another site in the same city. In October 1910 he finally declared bankruptcy. Reportedly, his vice-president disappeared with the last car in the factory and as many leftover parts as could be fit into the back seat.

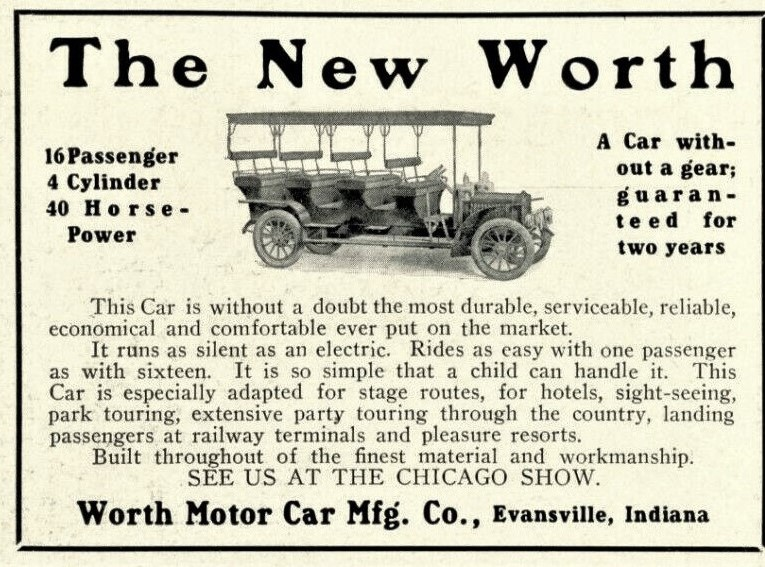
1907 Worth 16 passenger Model F car advertisement in Motor Magazine

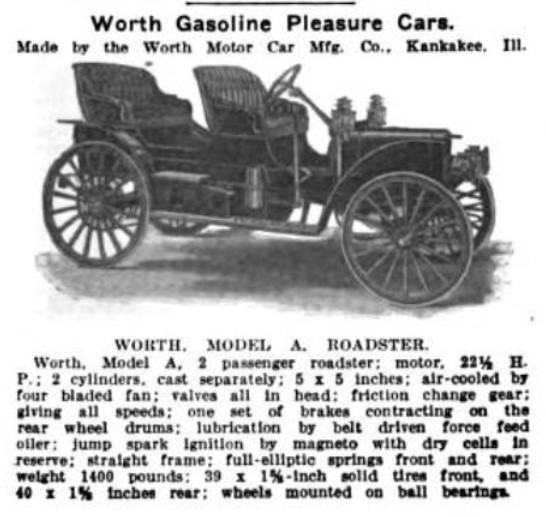
1909 Worth runabout Model A Roadster

=== Single Center (1906–1908) ===
From 1900, Single Center Spring Buggy Company built motorized buggies to order until 1906 when Willis Copeland involved himself with W. O. Worth. Worth designed the Worth car and designed for Copeland a bigger chain-drive motorized buggy that was offered for the 1906 model year as the Single Center.

There were two models of the Single Center sold from 1906 to 1908. The Single Center 12 HP Auto Buggy was a high-wheeler priced at $675 (equivalent to $24,187 in 2025), while the Single Center 12/15 HP Roadster was advertised as being "not a buggy but a racy-looking automobile runabout". Its top speed was up to 30 mph (48 km/h) and priced at $800, equivalent to $28,667 in 2025. Both models were friction-drive, with a flat-twin engine.

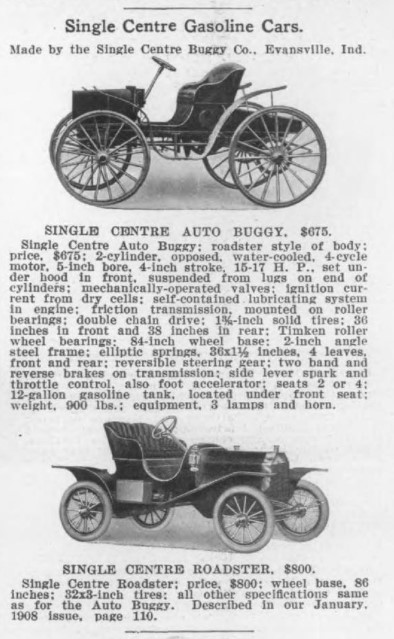

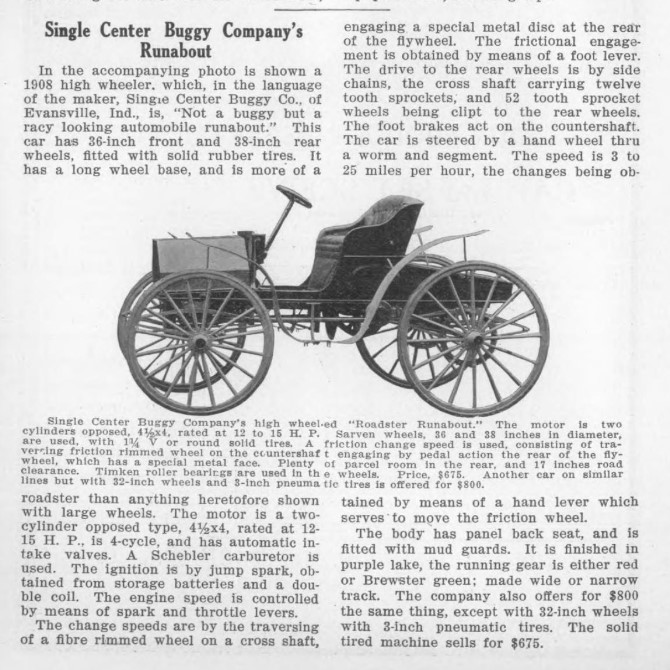

=== Simplicity, Evansville, Traveler (1906–1911) ===
The Windsor Automobile Company failed in 1906 and Willis Copeland formed a new enterprise, the Evansville Automobile Company, which he successfully sold stock to a number of friends in town, including the mayor. He also set up a proper assembly line for the first time.

Locally the car was marketed as the Evansville, but as the Simplicity the four-cylinder water-cooled car was offered in a variety of body styles. Its most distinctive feature was its friction gear transmission which did away with the clanking chains Copeland had disliked in the previous cars. Unfortunately whenever it rained, it would not move. When finally Copeland discovered the reason for this was moisture in the friction gears, he also discovered that it could be solved by enclosing the gears, which he did.

In January 1909 Willis Copeland organized the Traveler Automobile Company in Evansville for the production of a car to be known as the Traveler. Copeland was already manufacturing the Simplicity, and the Traveler was exactly the same car but with the friction gears enclosed. Changing the car's name from Simplicity to Traveler was hoped to be a good public relations move.

The Traveler Automobile Company failed in 1911 and subsequently Copeland became Evansville's first Chevrolet dealer.

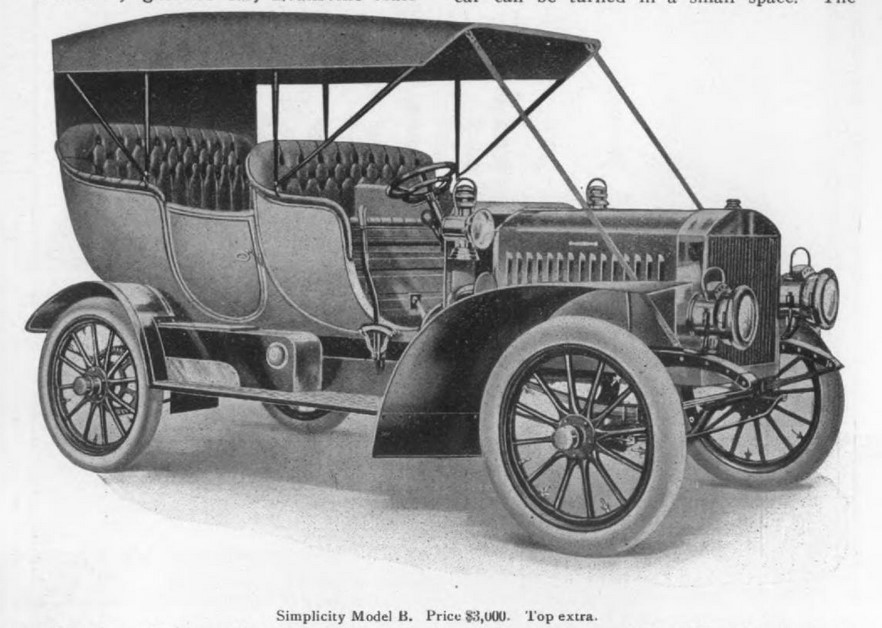

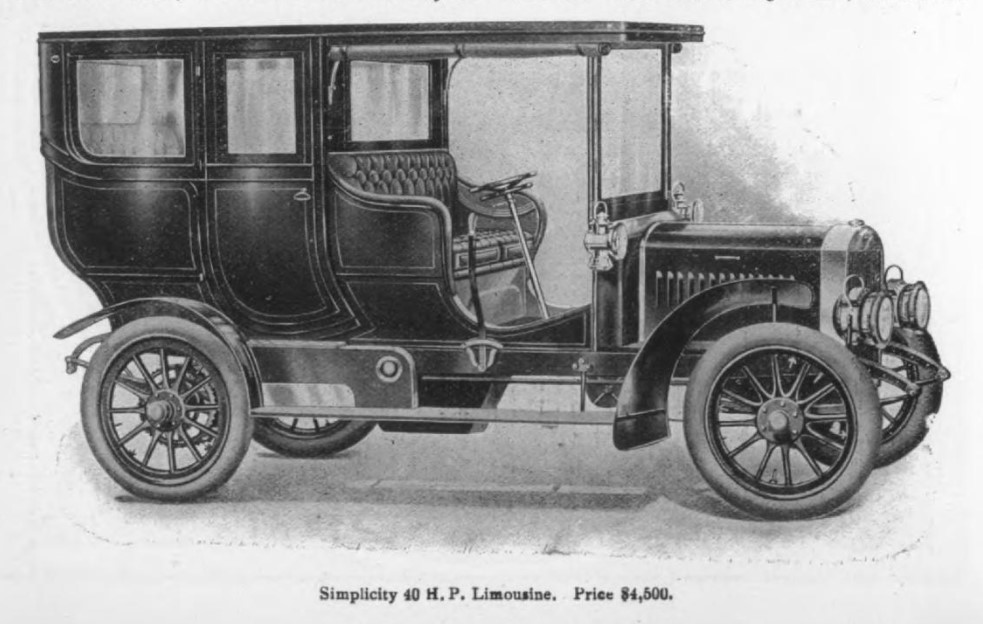
