= High wheeler =

Early automobile design trend

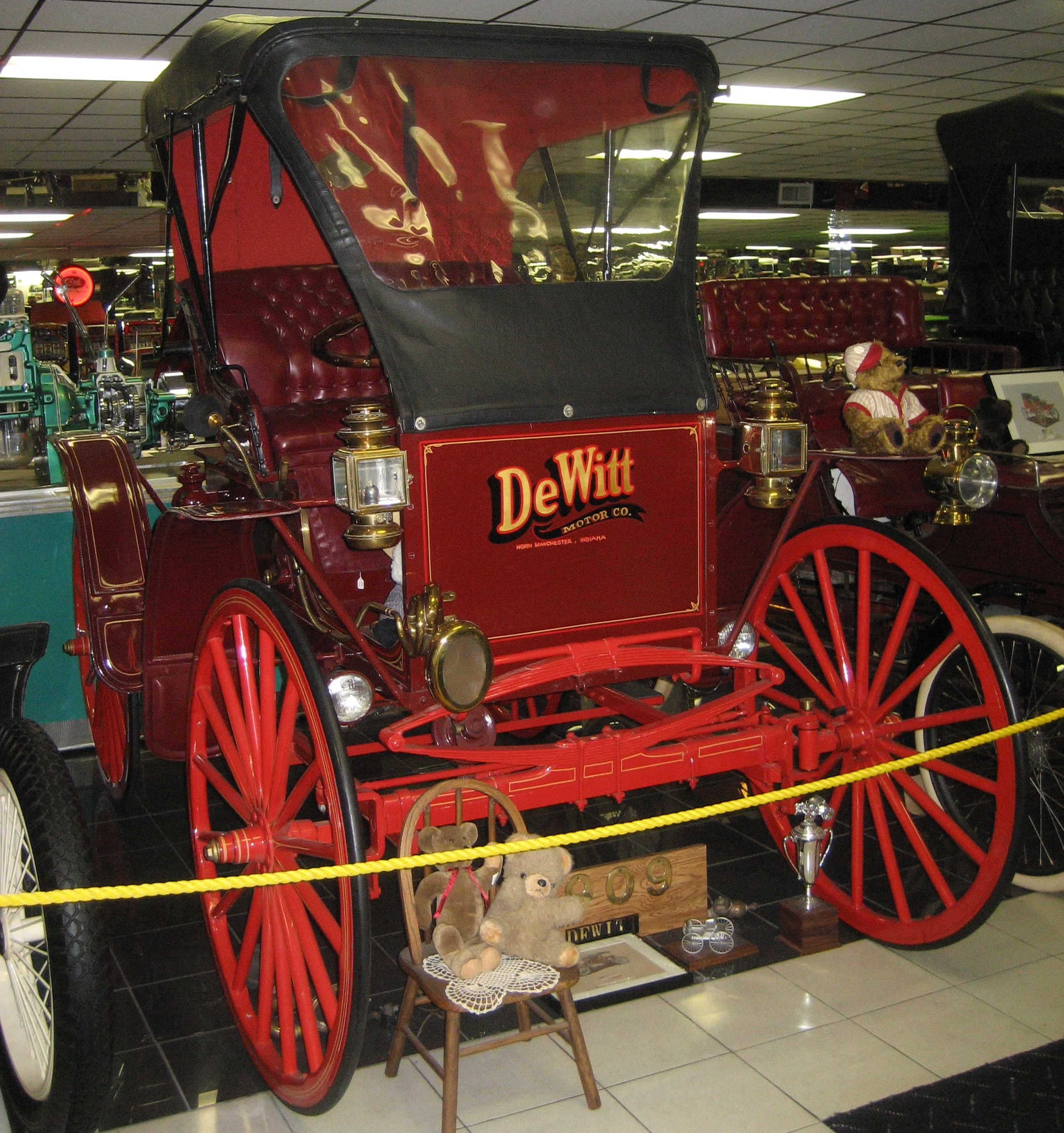
1909 DeWitt

A high wheeler is a car which uses large diameter wheels that are similar to those used by horse-drawn vehicles. These cars were produced until about 1915, predominantly in the United States.

== Design ==
High wheelers were derived from horse-drawn wagons, and often were conversions of these. Similarly to these wagons, they often had wood-spoke wheels, suspensions, and boxy wooden bodies.

The large-diameter slender wheels provided ample ground clearance on the primitive roads of the late 19th century, and frequently had solid rubber tires.

These cars were produced in many body styles. The most common were the motorized wagon (utility vehicle) runabout, roadster and buggy, some with detachable tonneaus.

Examples of high wheelers

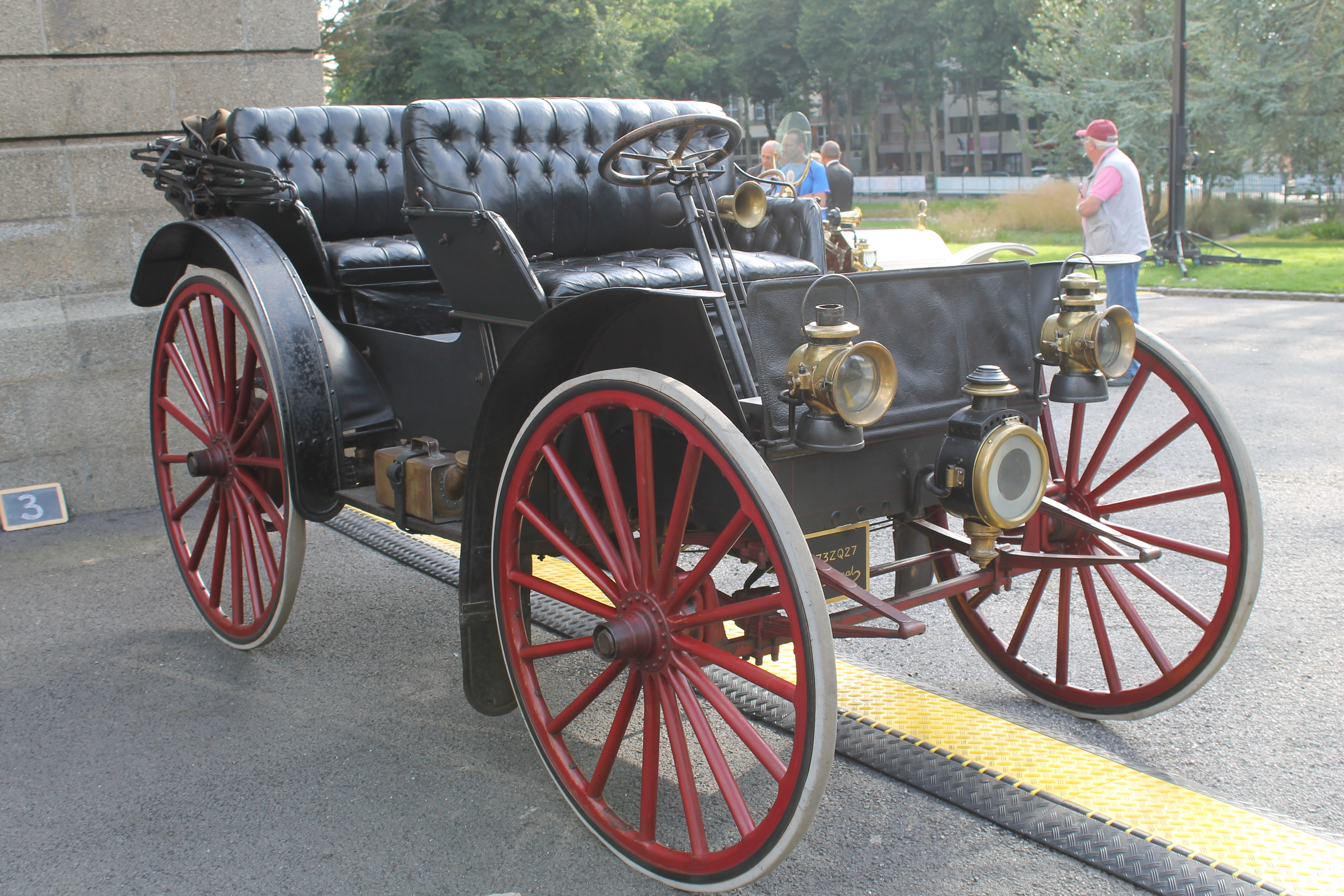
International Harvester Auto-Buggy

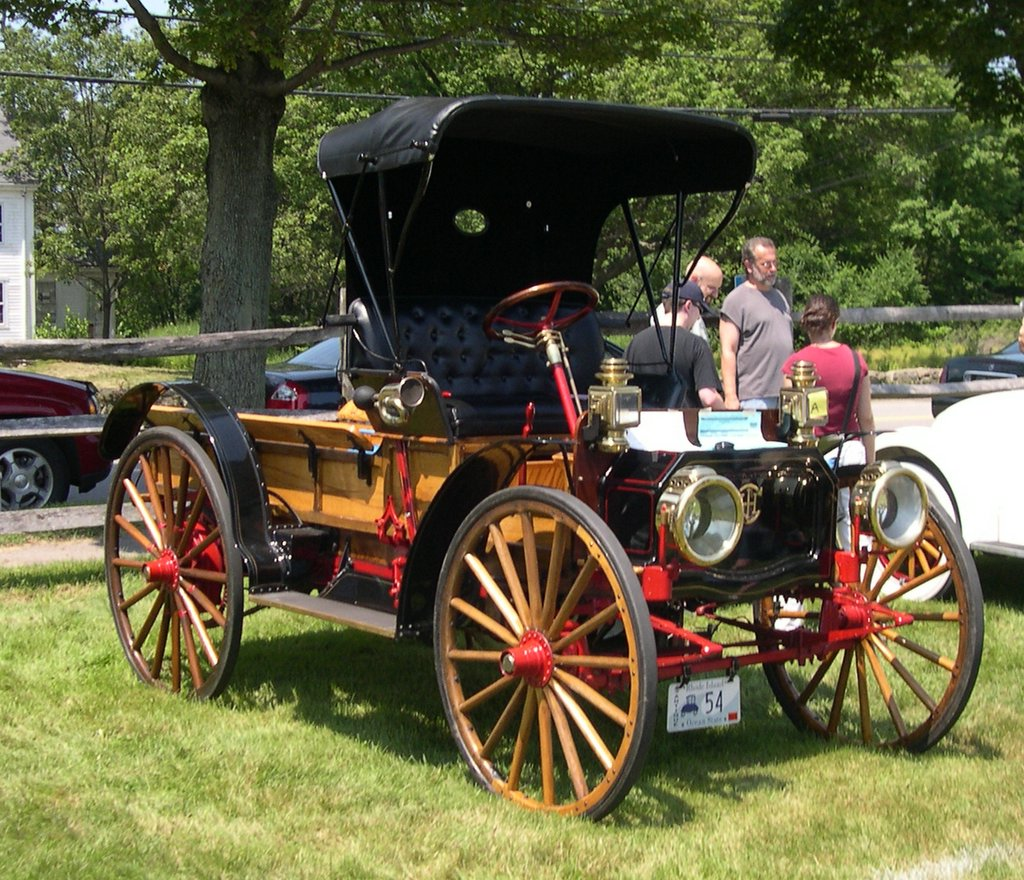
1911 International Harvester Auto Wagon

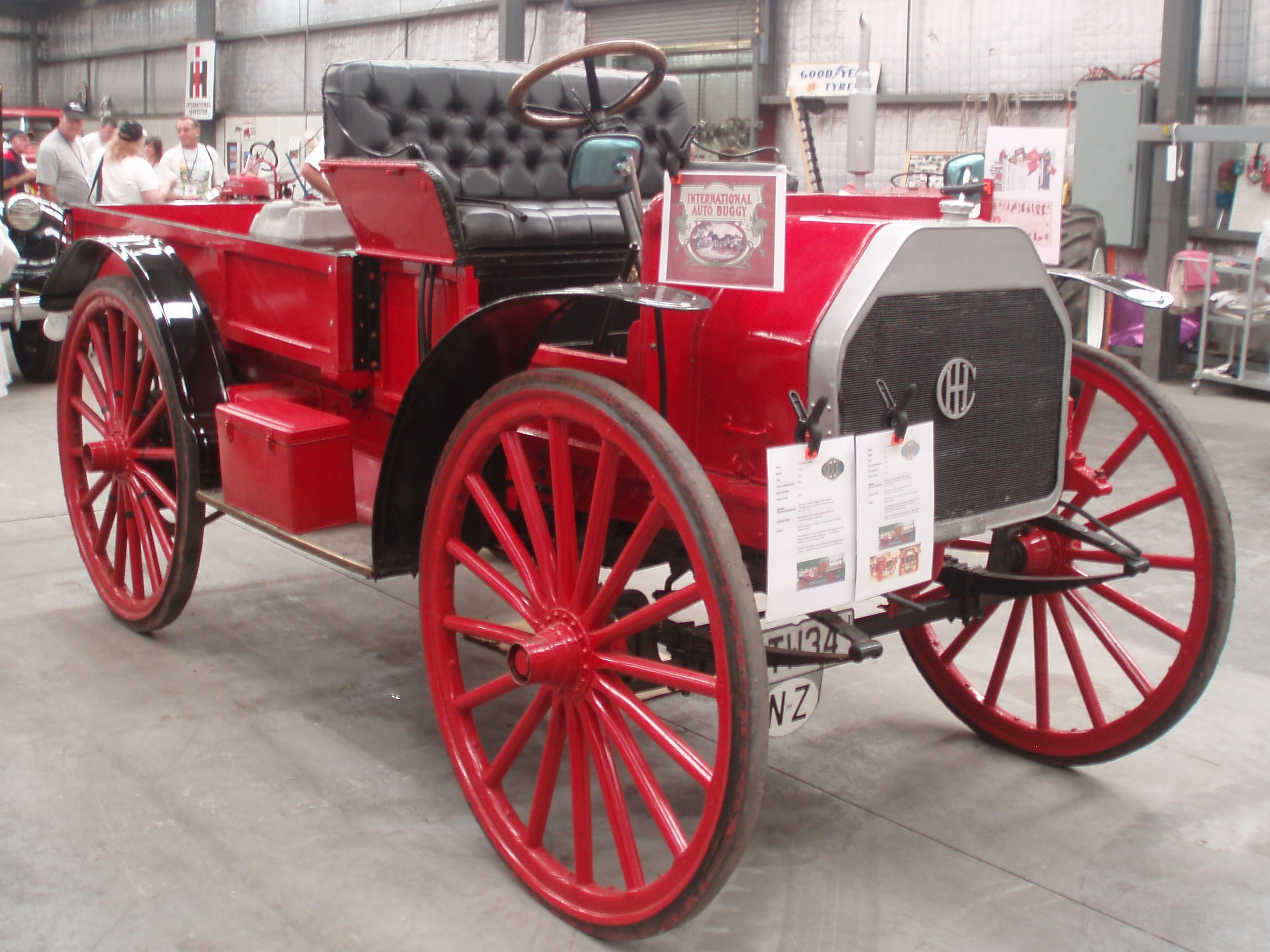
International Harvester Auto Wagon

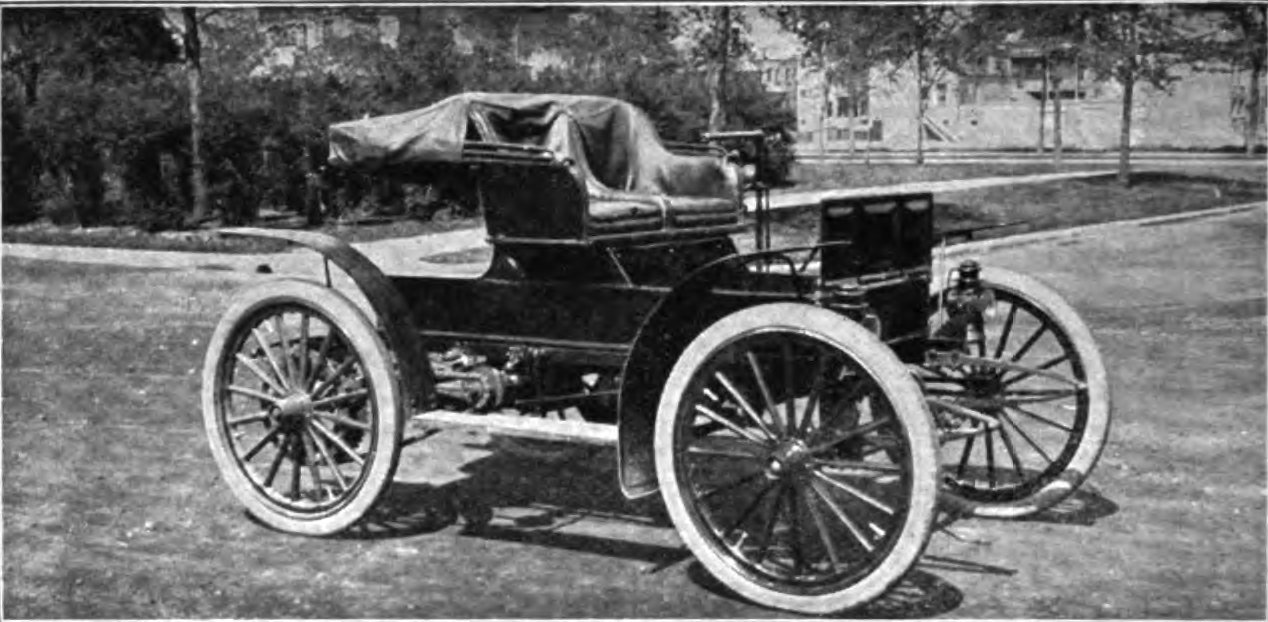
Sears Model L

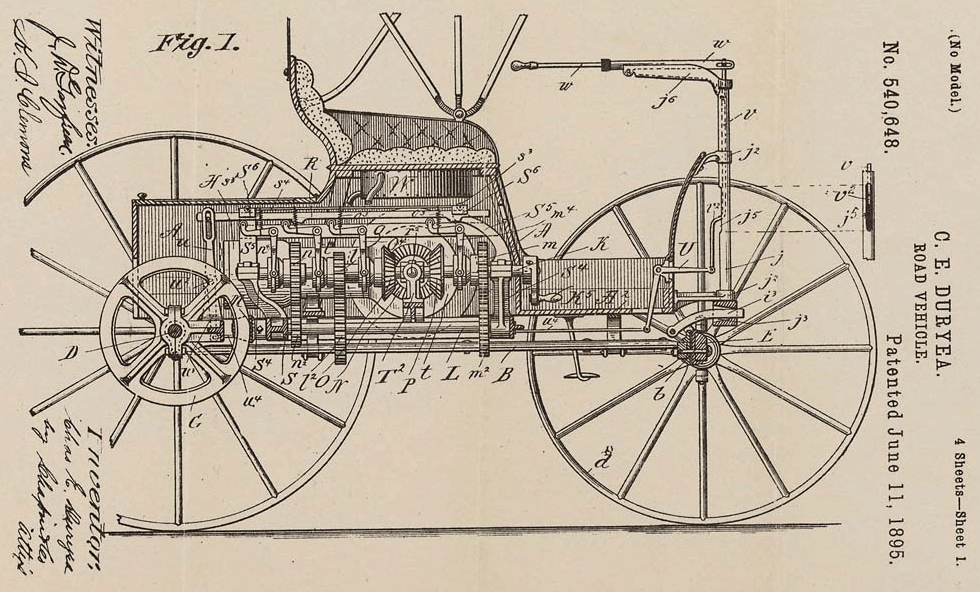
Patent drawing for the Duryea Road Vehicle, 1895

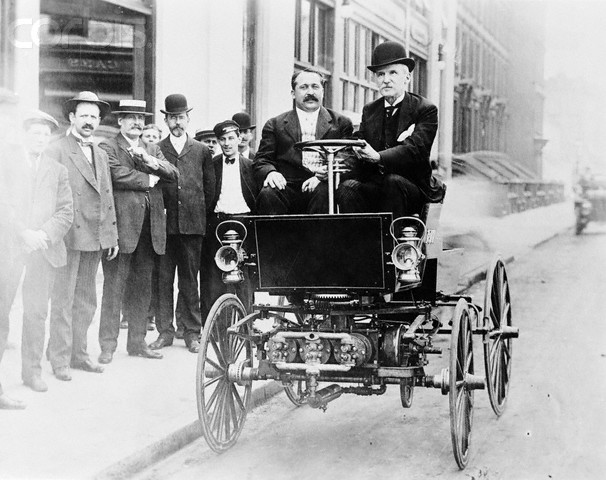
George B. Selden driving an automobile in 1905

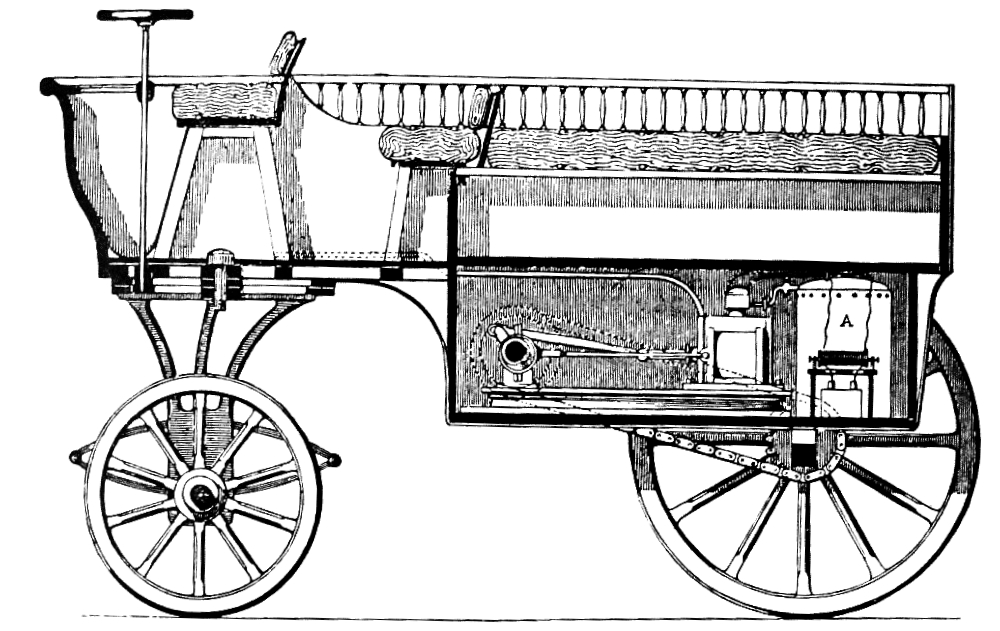
Lenoir Hippomobile, 1863

== History ==
Before gasoline engines became widely available, high wheelers were powered by electric motors or steam engines.

The decline of the high wheeler began when standard automobiles became more sophisticated and inexpensive. The end came with the popularity of the Ford Model T. The last high wheelers were built around 1915.

== Manufacturers ==
The following companies produced high-wheeler cars:

- ABC
- Anchor Buggy
- Åtvidabergs Vagnfabrik
- Best
- Black
- Buckeye
- Clark-Hatfield
- Clymer Durable Motor Car Company
- Cole*
- Columbia Electric*
- De Schaum
- DeWitt
- Duer Coach & Carriage Company
- Duryea
- Economy Motor Car Company
- Electrobat
- Eureka
- Fuller*
- Hatfield
- Haynes-Apperson*
- Hobbie Accessible
- Holsman
- Holyoke
- International Harvester*
- Jeannin Henri Jeannin
- Jewell/Jewel*
- Keystone
- Kiblinger
- King*
- LindsleyLindsley Auto Chassis Company
- Luverne*
- McIntyre*
- Pomeroy Motor Vehicle Company
- Reliable Dayton
- Schacht*
- Sears
- Single Center
- Sperry Electric
- Staver
- Strong & Rogers Electric
- Success
- Vaughn Manufacturing Company
- Waverley Electric*
- Woods*
- Zimmerman Manufacturing Company*

* Companies which also produced cars other than high wheelers
