= Geiser Manufacturing =

Defunct American manufacturer of agricultural machinery

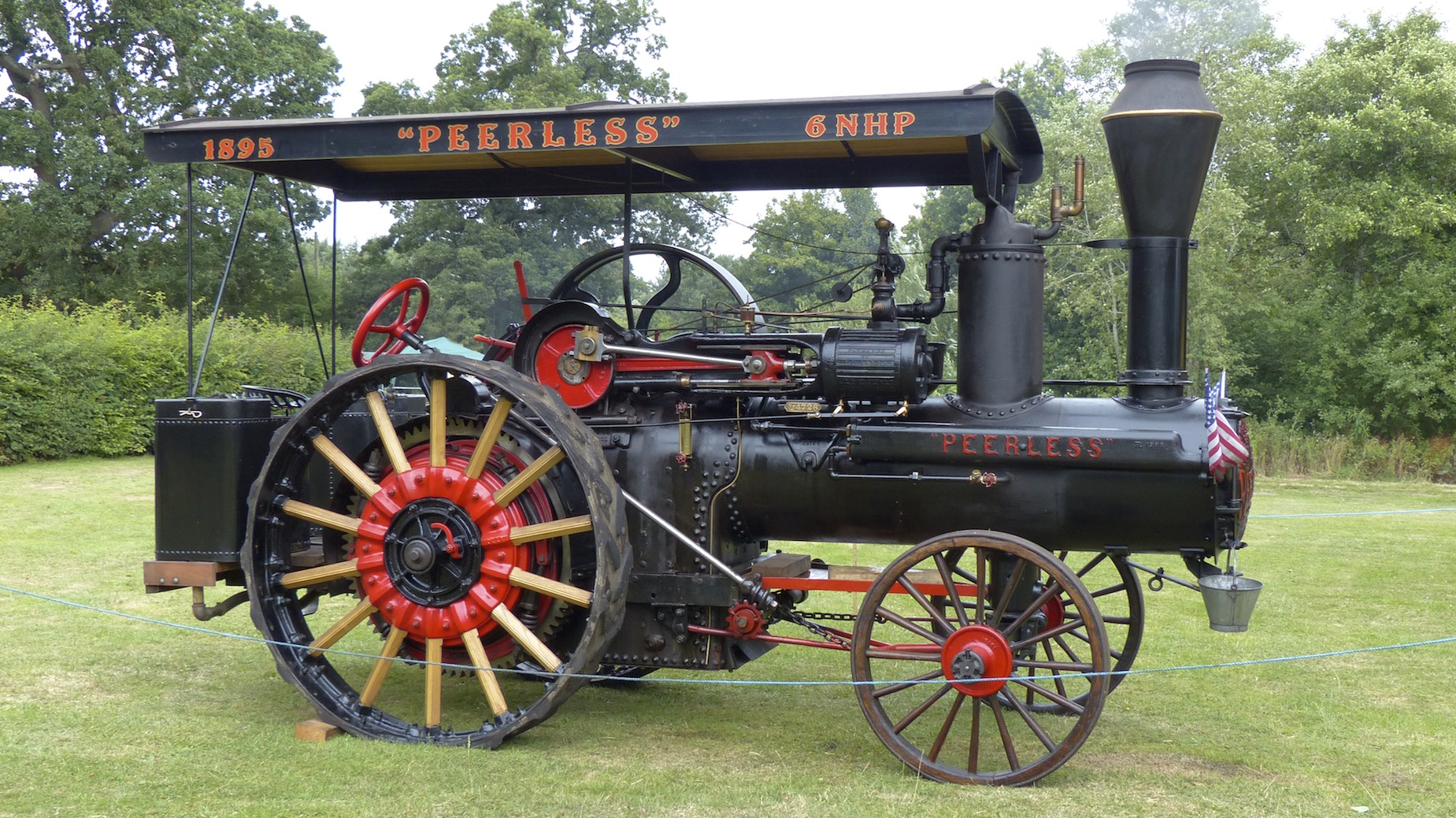
Peerless steam engine built by Geiser Manufacturing in 1895, Serial number 4726

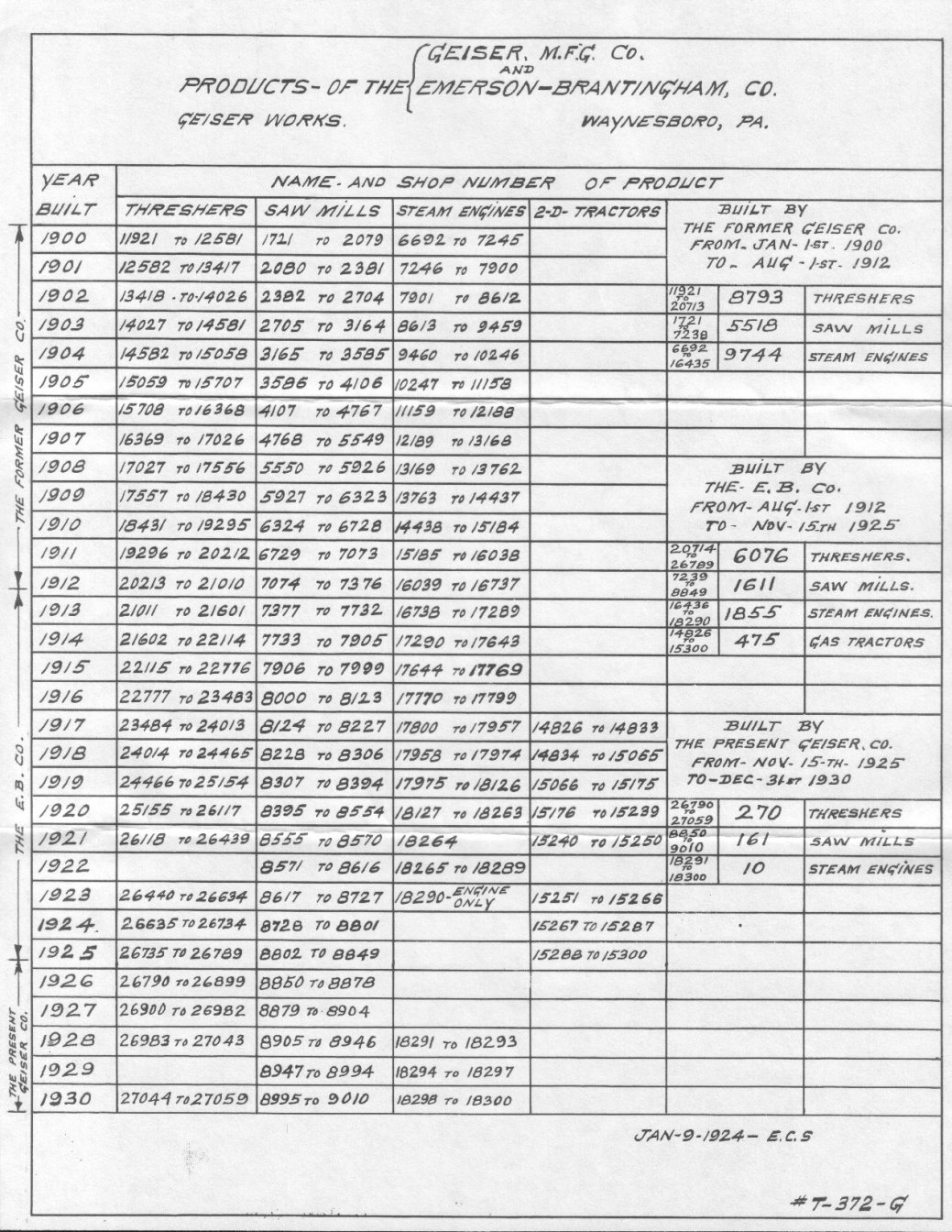
List of Geiser products and associated numbers, 1924

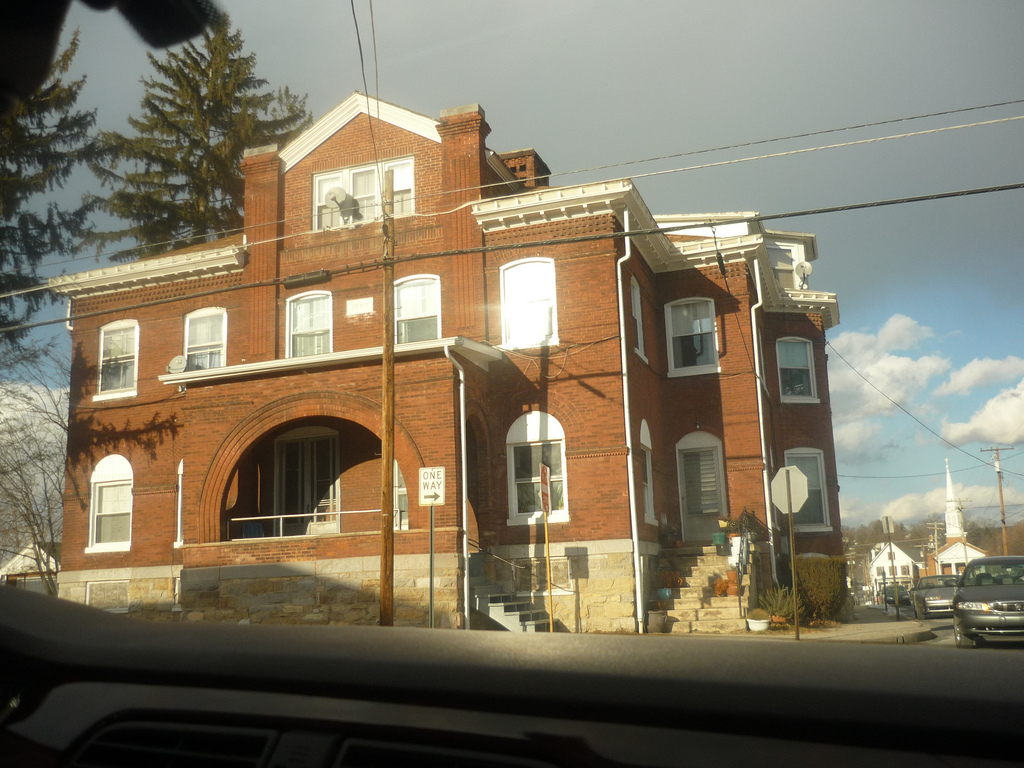
Geiser Manufacturing Company office

Geiser Manufacturing Company was an early manufacturing company in Waynesboro, Pennsylvania. Geiser Manufacturing was incorporated in 1869 by Peter and Daniel Geiser. The company built grain separators, threshers, plows, and steam traction engines. The company's brand name was Peerless. The main building was 334 ft long and 3 stories in height, and had a 34 ft cupola. In January 1891 its total monthly payroll amounted to over 10,000 US dollars ($239500 in 2010 dollars) and employed 162 people.

In 1899 the company expanded outside Waynesboro and bought the Crowell industrial park in Greencastle, Pennsylvania, and began producing its Geiser's first gasoline engines there. Up to this point, all its products had been steam-powered.

In March 1912, Geiser's Waynesboro plant was hit by a strike involving over a thousand employees after "a new superintendent had new ideas concerning the manner in which the place should be run." Other plants were not affected by the dispute.

In 1912 Geiser Manufacturing was purchased by the Emerson-Brantingham Company of Rockford, Illinois, which had gone so far in August 1912 as to issue over 22 million dollars ($490 million in 2010 dollars) in stock in order to raise the capital to purchase the company along with Reeves & Co of Columbus, Indiana and Gas Traction Company of Minneapolis. In 1936 Geiser became bankrupt and was forced to sell everything. On August 21, 1940, while removing equipment, a fire leveled the plant which was thought to have been started by a welders torch. It had been said the glow of the fire could be seen from almost forty miles away. Currently, only the main office building stands, and the main property is now occupied by a funeral home, parking lot, NAPA Auto Parts Store, Bowersox Memorial Stone's and church as well as a post office, .

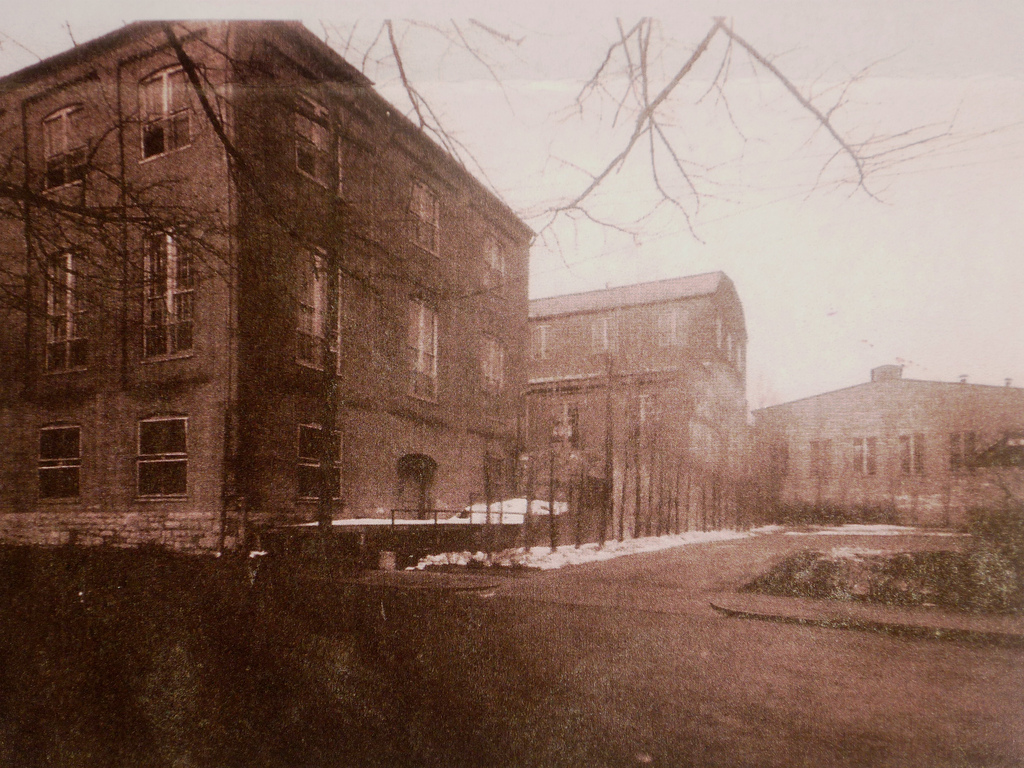
Geiser looking on Broad St. 1939

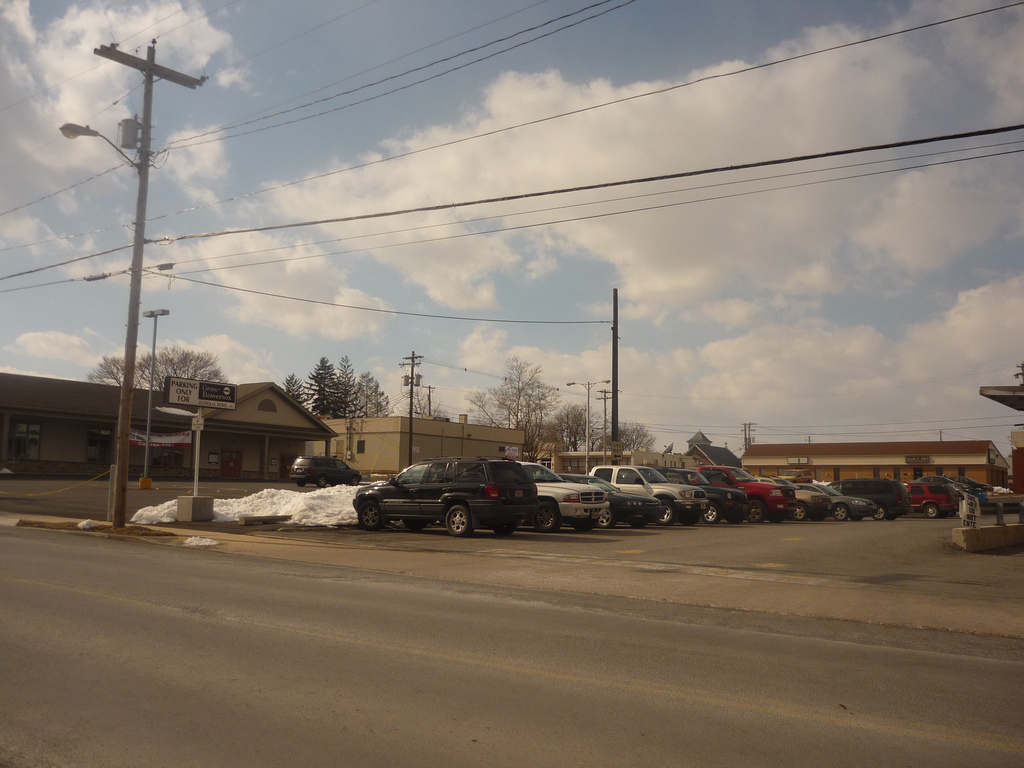
Same location. 2011

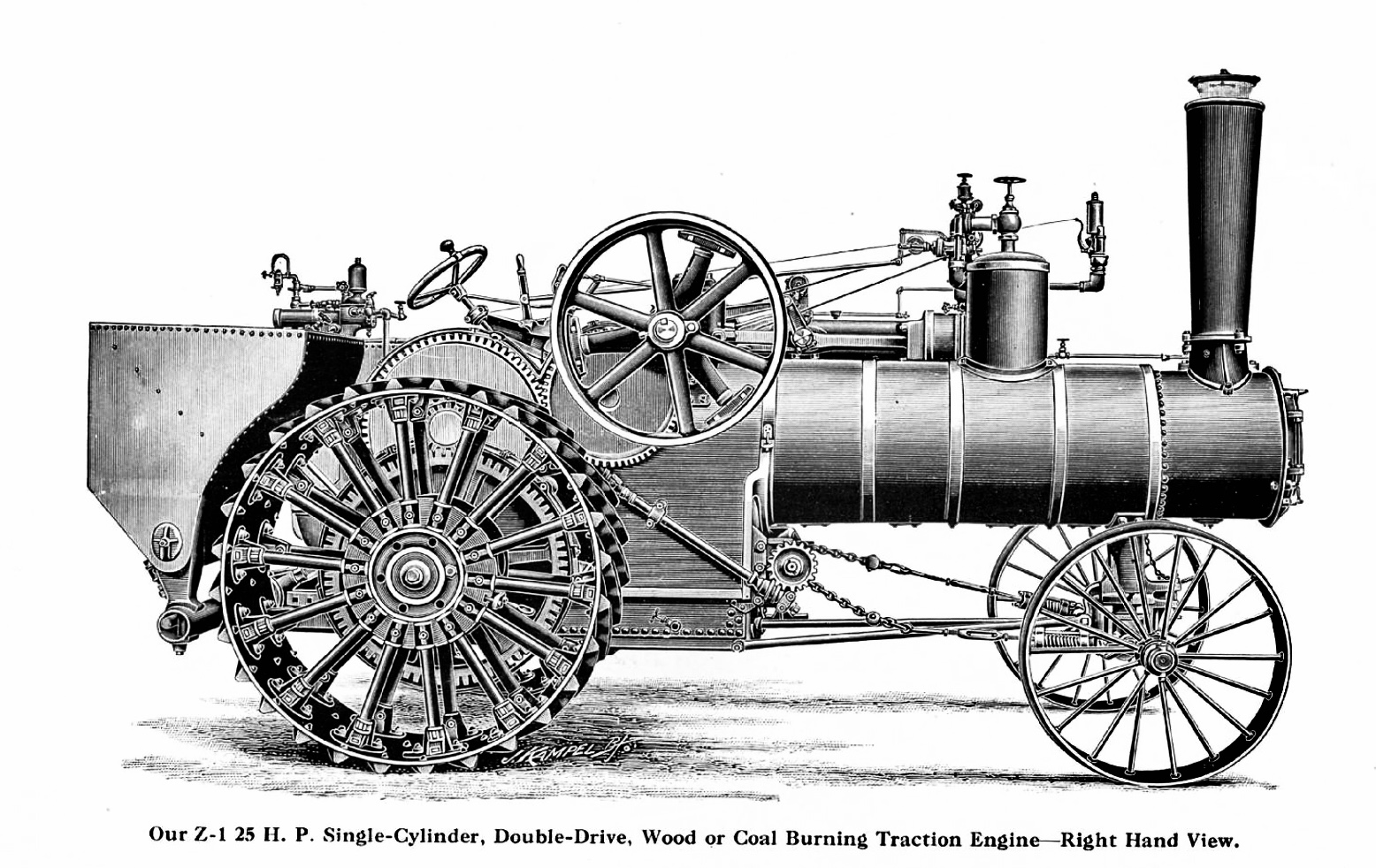
Geiser Z-1 25 hp (1913)

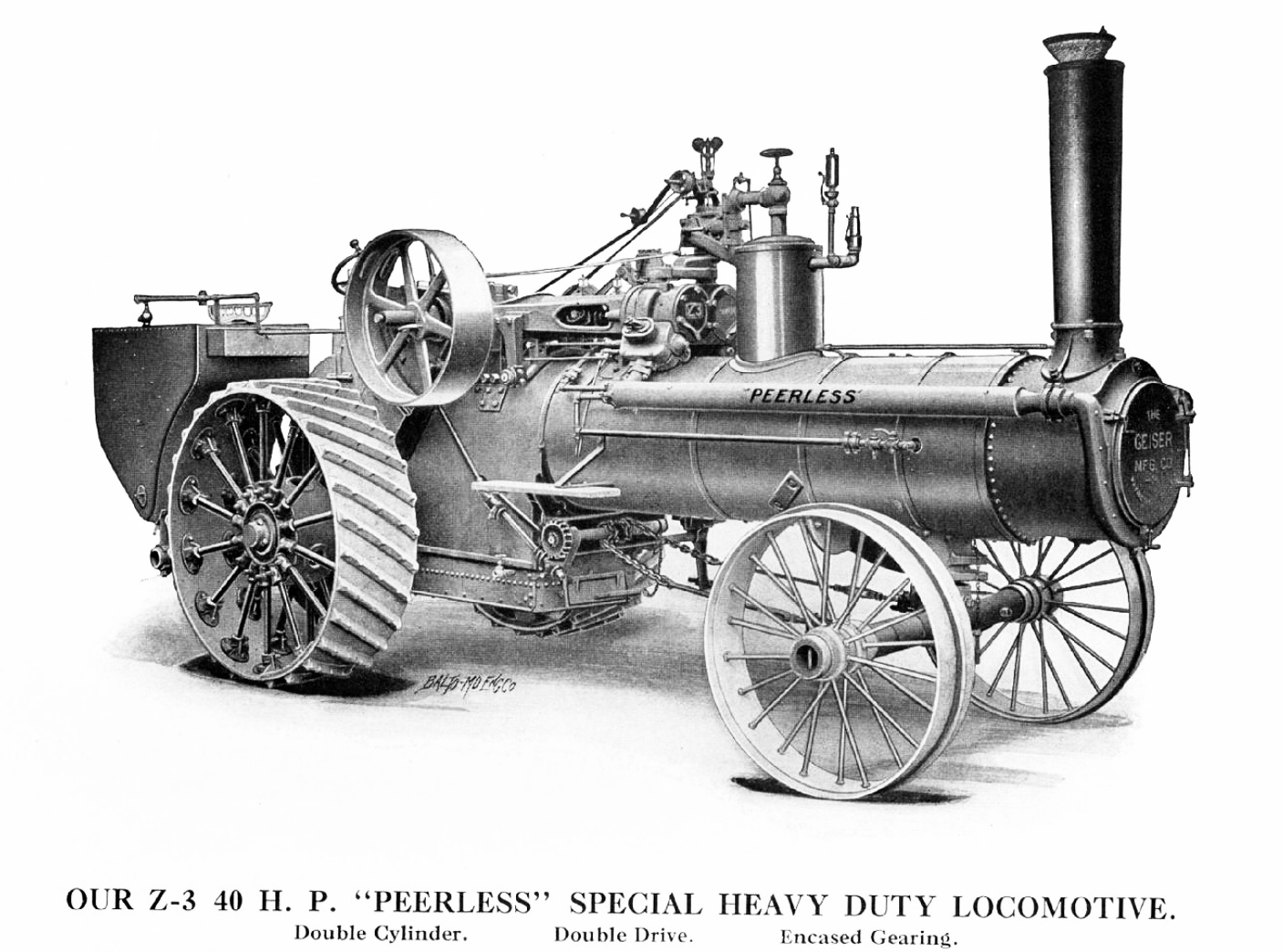
Geiser Peerless Z-3 40 hp (1913)

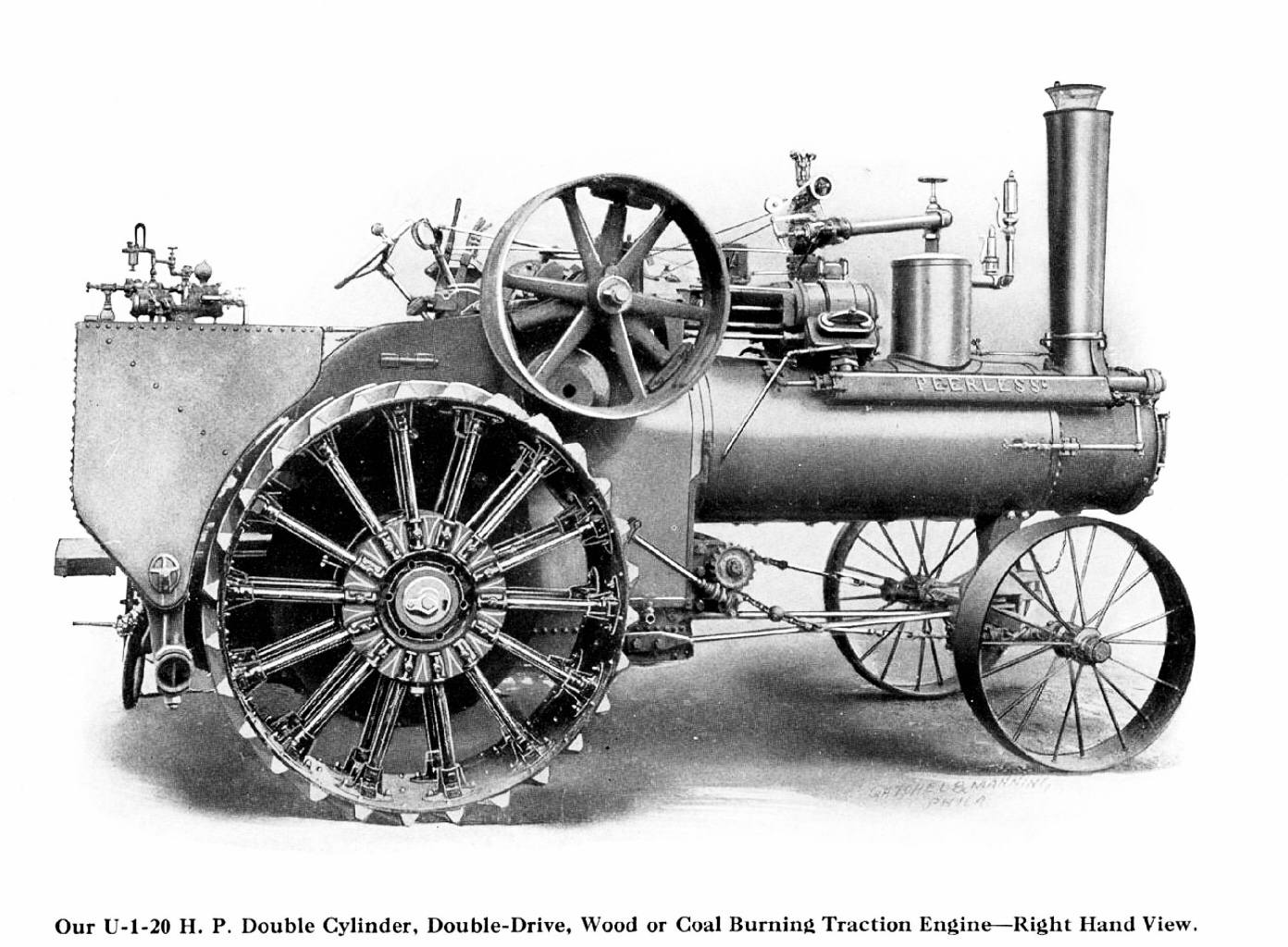
Geiser Peerless U-1 20 hp (1913)

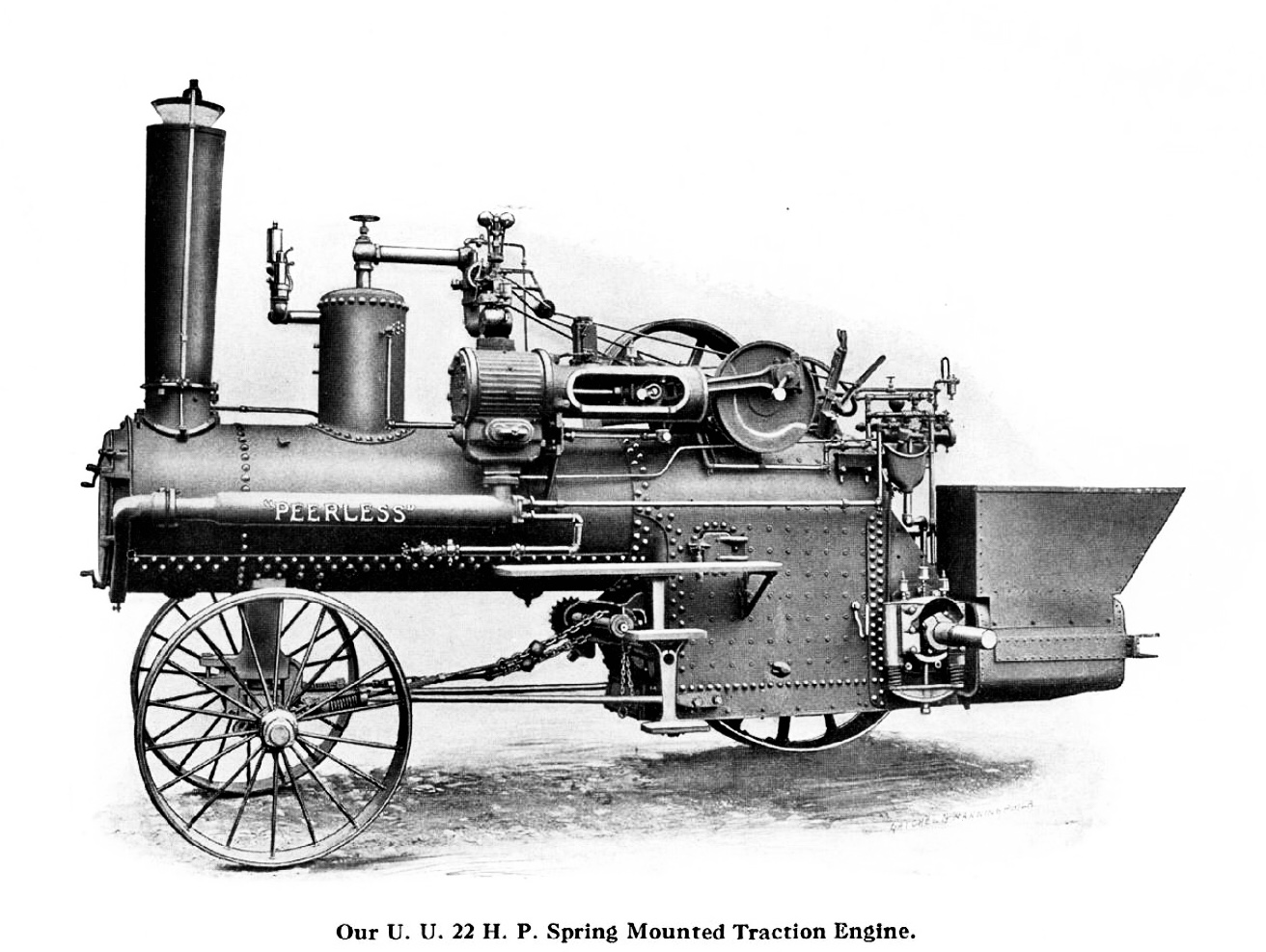
Geiser Peerless U-U 22 hp (1913)

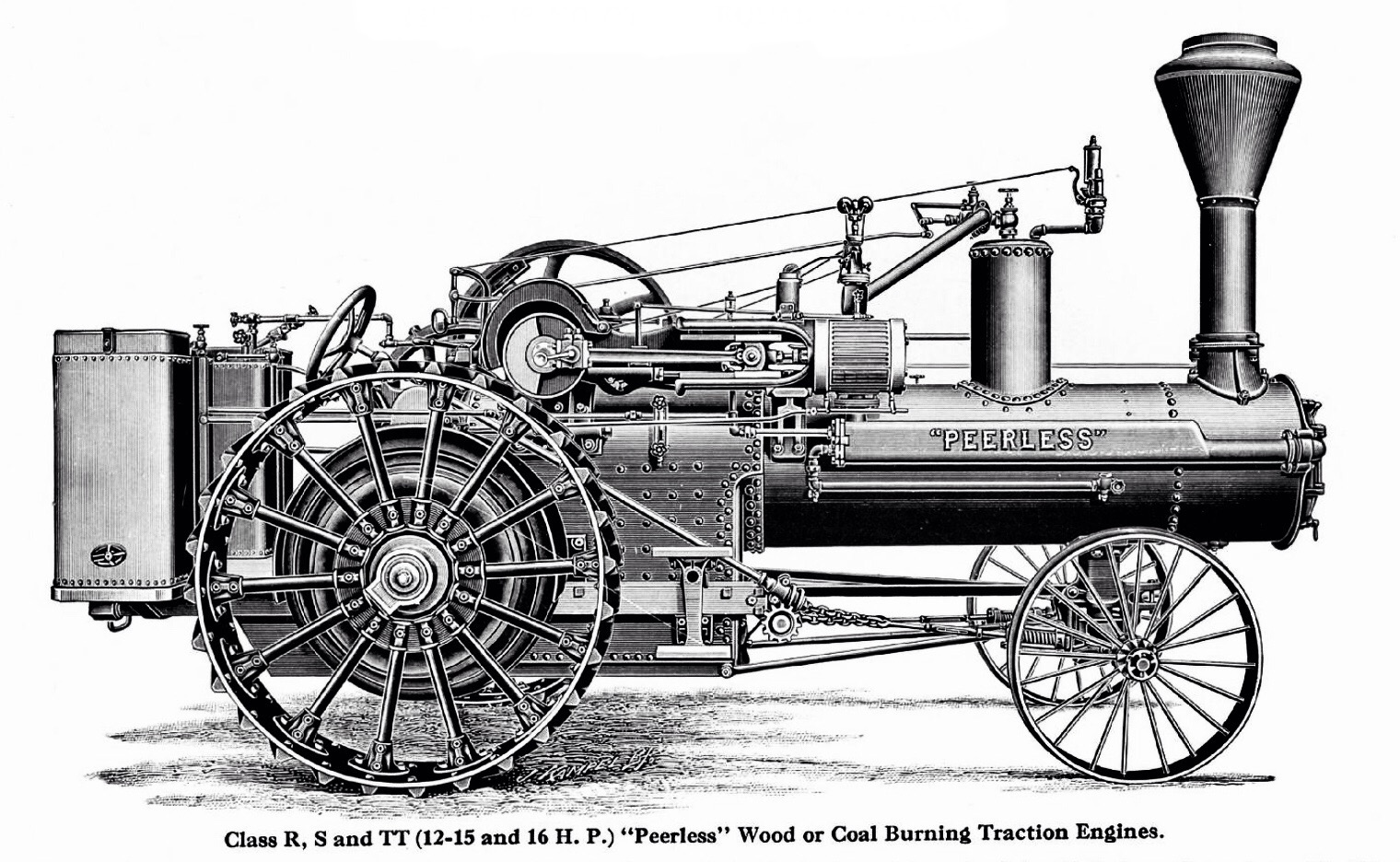
Geiser Peerless R, S, TT 12 hp, 15 hp, 16 hp (1913)

== Production figures steam tractors Geiser ==
Year	Production figures	Model	Serial number
1889	290		
1890	190		
1891	330		
1892	306		
1893	310		
1894	260	12 hp	4369
1895	310	6 hp	4726
1896	335		
1897	335		
1898	450	10 hp	5588
1899	540		
1900	550		
1901	610		
1902	550	U 18 hp, 13 hp	8446, 8549
1903	710	16 hp, 12 hp	9172, 9359
1904	850	10 hp	9511
1905	790		
1906	920		12135
1907	1,020	18 hp	12907
1908	980		13588, 13742
1909	600		14164, 14170
1910	675		14460, 14710
1911	750		
1912	850	16 hp	16479, 17065
1913	40	Peerless Z-3 40 hp, Z-1 25 hp, Peerless U-1 20 hp, Peerless U-U 22 hp	17164
1914	700	15 hp	17178, 17529, 17551
1915	540	8 hp	17741
1916	360		
1917	120		
1918	40		
1919	160		
1920	20		
1921	150		
1922	130		
1923	10		
1924	20		
Sum	15,801		

- X = 14 hp
- U = 18 hp
- UU = 22 hp
- Z = 25 hp
