= Schloemer (automobile) =

1890 American motor vehicle

Schloemer Motor Wagon
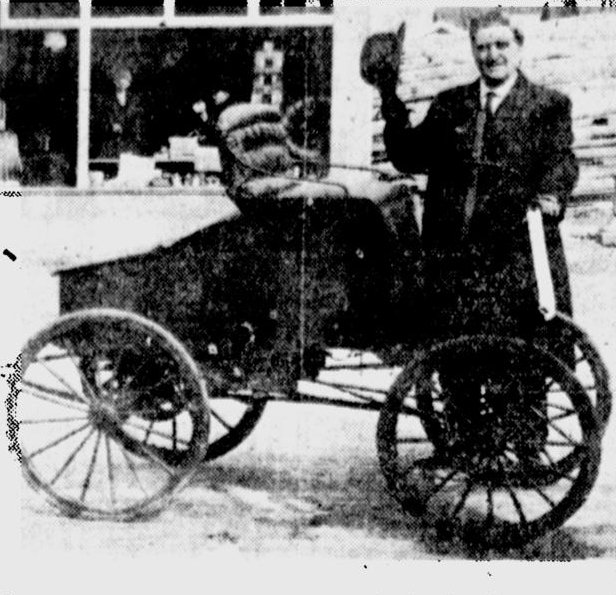
- Fay Cusick with the Schloemer automobile in 1921

Overview
- Also called: Schloemer automobile
- Production: 1890
- Assembly: United States: Milwaukee, Wisconsin
- Designer: Gottfried Schloemer; Frank Toepfer

Powertrain
- Engine: Single-cylinder engine (originally likely two-stroke Sintz Machinery Company engine, replaced with four-stroke Wolverine Junior engine)

The Schloemer automobile (or Schloemer Motor Wagon) is an automobile built in 1890 by blacksmith and coppersmith Gottfried Schloemer and locksmith Frank Toepfer of Milwaukee, Wisconsin, United States. Operated for the first time in 1892, it has a single-cylinder engine mounted beneath its seat that drove its powered axle via a belt. It is noted for being possibly the first automobile to feature a muffler. Claims of the historic importance of the Schloemer automobile have diminished over time: in 1948, it was considered the first practical automobile in the United States, but by 2023, it was only regarded as the first car to operate in Milwaukee. The vehicle is currently on display at the Milwaukee Public Museum.

== Background and design ==
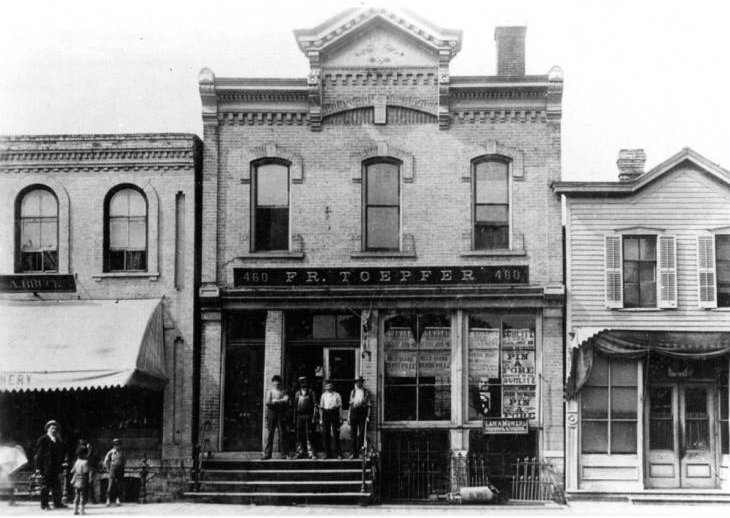
Frank Toepfer's Milwaukee machine shop in 1902, where the Schloemer automobile was built in 1890

Prior to their automobile, Milwaukee blacksmith and coppersmith Gottfried Schloemer and locksmith Frank Toepfer had built an unsuccessful vehicle resembling a bicycle. In 1890, they again collaborated to build the Schloemer automobile, utilizing a combination differential, drive pinion, muffler (possibly the first installed on an automobile), spark system (which used two steel points that made contact with the engine), and a wick-type carburetor (sometimes erroneously reported to be the first patented carburetor). Its single-cylinder engine was mounted beneath the seat and connected to the powered axle by a belt. Over the course of its existence, brakes were added and the steering of the vehicle was improved. Only a single Schloemer automobile was ever built.

== History ==
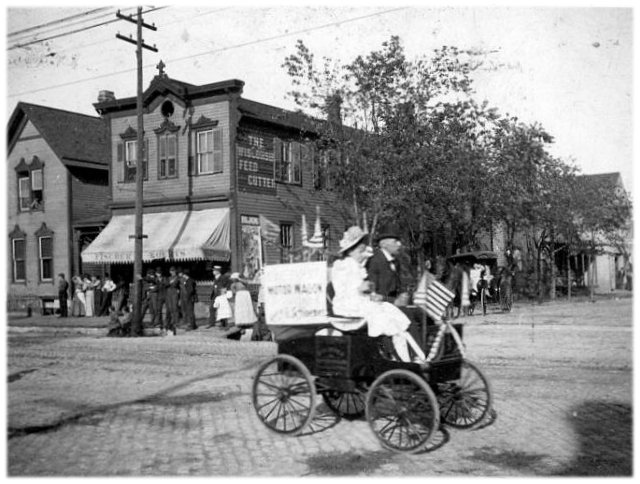
Gottfried Schloemer driving the car, circa 1908

While claims to dates regarding the Schloemer automobile vary, there is general acceptance that it was first built in 1890 and driven for the first time in 1892, meaning it predates the Duryea Motor Wagon by a year. In 1892, Schloemer sought out financial support to build an automobile factory in Milwaukee, but failed due to the Panic of 1893. He then turned his attention to developing farm equipment while the car that bore his name was put into storage until 1920.

According to the Wisconsin Society of Automotive Historians, in 1920 Schloemer traded his car to Fay Cusick, a car dealer from West Allis, Wisconsin, in exchange for a Maxwell vehicle. After touring the car at auto shows and fairs for a decade, Cusick then sold the Schloemer to a group of supporters of the Milwaukee Public Museum for $4,000 in 1930, who then donated the car to the museum. The Milwaukee Public Museum instead claims that it purchased the car directly from Schloemer in 1920.

After it was acquired by the museum, volunteer Herbert Smith restored the Schloemer automobile. He came to the conclusion that the engine had been replaced, most likely while Cusick owned the car. A four-stroke Wolverine Junior engine had been chosen as the replacement engine, while the original engine is believed to have been a two-stroke engine built by the Sintz Machinery Company of Grand Rapids, Michigan.

== Legacy ==
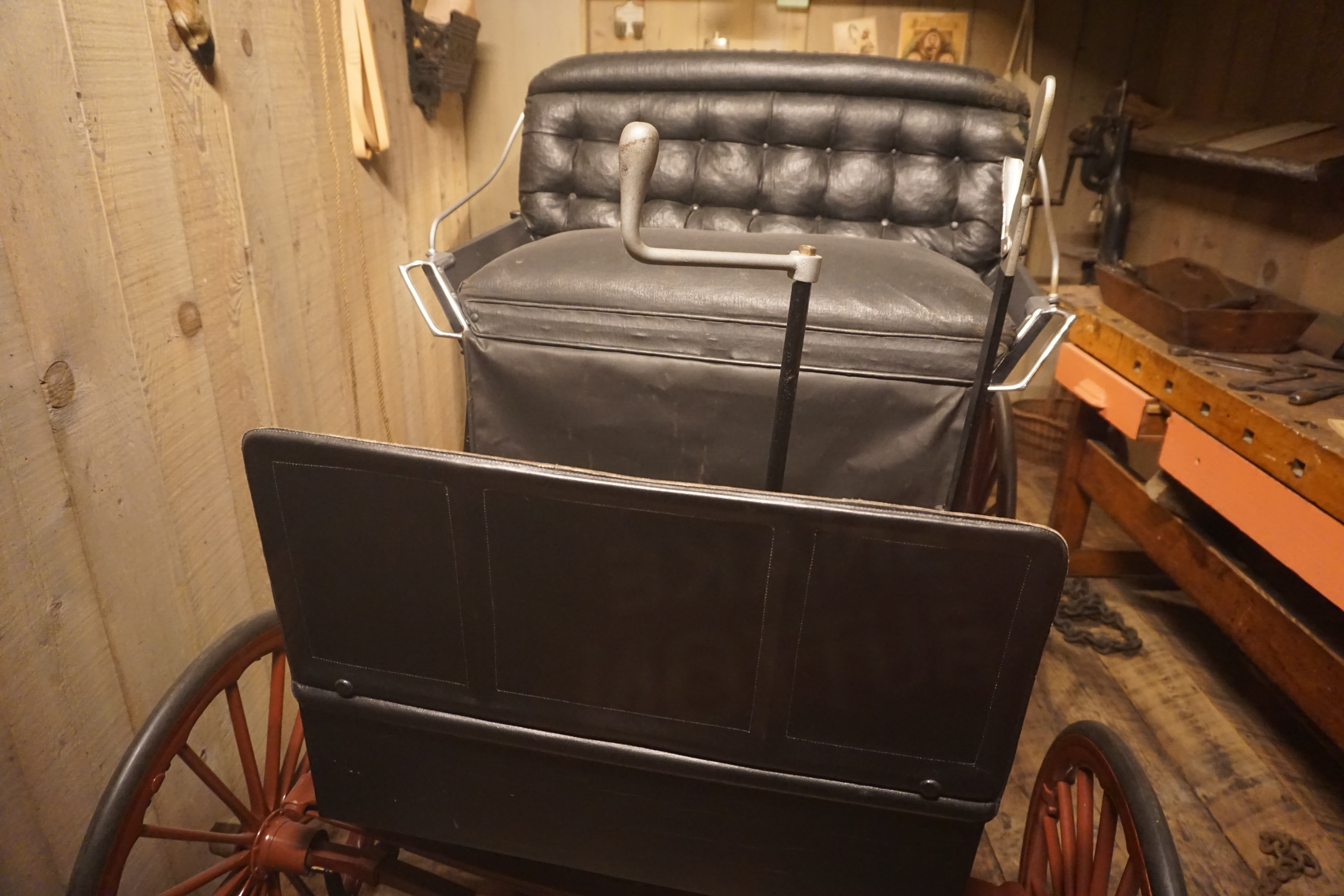
The Schloemer automobile on display at the Milwaukee Public Museum in 2023

Claims of the historic importance of the Schloemer automobile have diminished over time. In 1948, writing in The Milwaukee Journal, Frank Sinclair called it "America's first practical horseless carriage". In that same article, Sinclair claimed the car originally used a single-cylinder gasoline-powered engine built in Grand Rapids; had two forward gears but no reverse gear; and ran at a top speed of 12 miles per hour (19 km/h).

In 1995, Roger A. Gribble, writing for the Wisconsin State Journal, stated the car was "believed to be the oldest gas car in America". In 2004, Jay Williams, writing for the Daily Citizen of Beaver Dam, Wisconsin, claimed "it was the first gasoline powered vehicle known to be designed and built in Wisconsin". As of 2023, the Milwaukee Public Museum describes the car as "the first internal combustion vehicle to run on the streets of Milwaukee".

The Encyclopædia Britannica notes that the Schloemer automobile was built successfully in 1892, but that at least four other internal-combustion, gasoline-powered cars predate it. These were the vehicles built by Sephaniah Reese, in 1887, and Charles Black, John William Lambert, and Henry Nadig, all in 1891.

The Schloemer automobile is currently on display in the Streets of Old Milwaukee exhibit in the Milwaukee Public Museum. According to museum president and CEO Ellen Censky, the vehicle will be included in the Milwaukee Revealed exhibit in the museum's new building after it moves.
