= Miller (automobile) =

Defunct American motor vehicle manufacturer

Miller Car Company
- Company type: Automobile manufacturer
- Founded: 1911; 115 years ago
- Defunct: 1913; 113 years ago
- Fate: Receivership, Sold
- Headquarters: Detroit, Michigan, United States
- Key people: Theodore Miller, Guy Sintz
- Products: Automobiles

The Miller was a brass era automobile built in Detroit, Michigan by the Miller Car Company from 1912 to 1913.

== History ==
The Miller Car Company was established in the Detroit Excelsior Works in 1911. Guy Sintz was factory manager. The Miller was built as roadsters and five-seat tourers that were powered by 30 hp and 40 hp four-cylinder Wisconsin engines. The vehicles were priced at $1,250 and $1,450, equivalent to $48,375 in 2025. In 1912 a 1,000-lb delivery wagon was added.

The company ran out of money in 1913 and the Kosmath Company purchased the factory. The Miller automobile design and Guy Sintz went to Pittsburgh where it was refined into the Pennsy automobile.

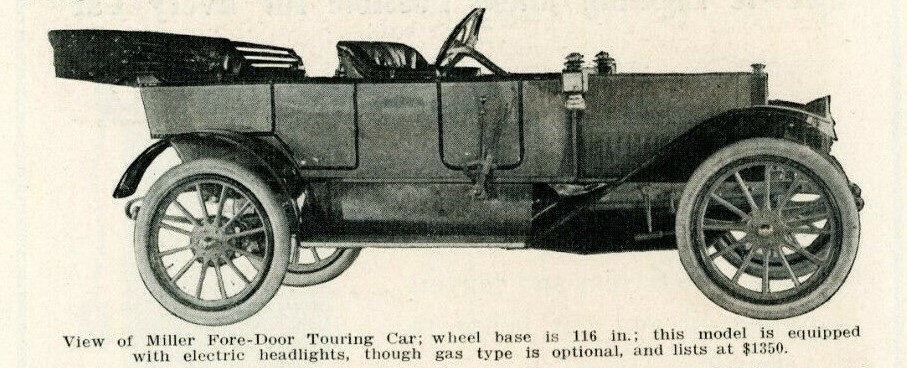
1912 Miller Touring Car

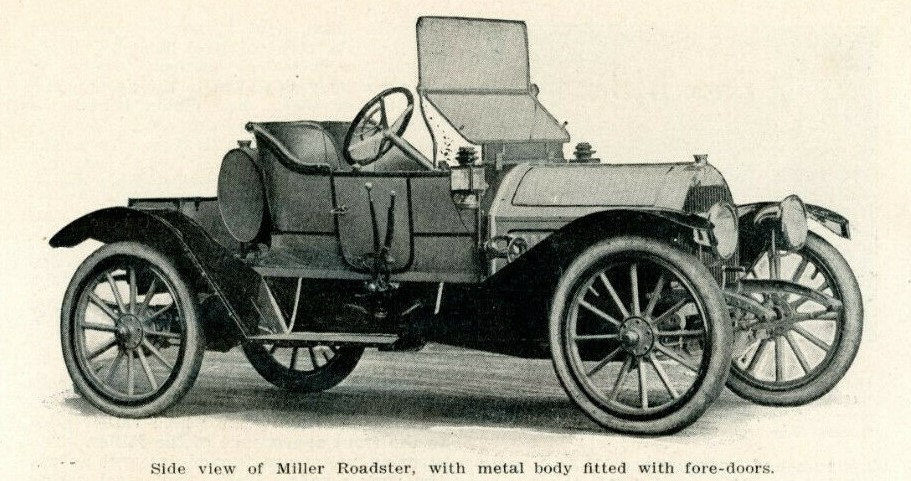
1912 Miller Roadster
