= John Henry Manny =

American inventor (1825–1856)

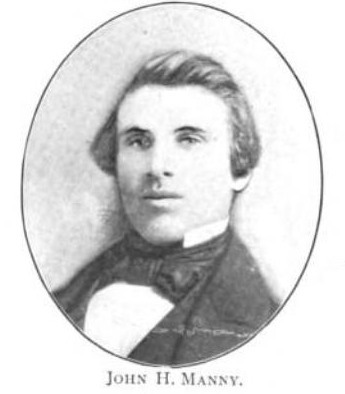
- John Henry Manny
- Born: November 28, 1825; Amsterdam, New York, US
- Died: January 31, 1856; Rockford, Illinois, US
- Resting place: Greenwood Cemetery (Rockford, Illinois)
- Occupation: Inventor
- Known for: Manny Reaper
- Spouse: Mary Dorr (m. 1853–1856)

John Henry Manny (1825–1856) was the inventor of the Manny Reaper, one of various makes of reaper used to harvest grain in the 19th century. Cyrus McCormick III, in his Century of the Reaper, called Manny "the most brilliant and successful of all Cyrus McCormick's competitors," a field of many brilliant people.

== Early life ==
John Henry Manny was born November 28, 1825, in Amsterdam, New York. His father was Pells Manny and mother was Sarah Swart. Siblings included Josiah Manny, Eliza Manny, Rebecca Ann Manny, and Gabriel Manny. He moved to Waddams Township in Stephenson County, Illinois, in the early 1850s. The Mannys visited George Esterly (1809–1893) who was manufacturing some of the first mechanical grain harvesting machines in Heart Prairie, near modern-day Janesville Wisconsin a short distance to the north. Manny helped in the shop to produce one and brought it back with him.

Manny married Mary Dorr in 1853, and by the fall of 1853 moved to Rockford, Illinois. There he could have more reapers manufactured by the firm Blinn & Emerson, and have them transported on the Galena and Chicago Union Railroad line. In 1854 he formed J.H. Manny & Company with investors Wait and Sylvester Talcott. In the summer of 1854 Jess Blinn and Ralph Emerson (1831–1914) joined the company.

== Reaper ==
John Henry Manny laid the foundation for the reaper business of Rockford. At the time of the invention of his reaper, he was farming with his father, Pells Manny, in Waddams Township, Stephenson County, Illinois, near McConnell, Illinois. They had a large crop of wheat and wanted a machine to cut it. The Mannys had heard that George Esterly, of Wisconsin, was making machines that would harvest grain. They visited Esterly to buy one of his machines but found that he would probably not be able to get one finished for them in time for their harvest. John H. Manny remained with Esterly at his shop to help him complete the "header", the part with the cutter bar. It was this insight into the construction of harvesting machinery that inspired the Manny family to develop their own reaper. Subsequently, the Mannys conceived the idea of creating a number of additional reapers that were to be sold to neighboring farmers.

There weren't any railroads through the country at this time, except a line to Rockford, so John Henry Manny and those interested in building his machine went to Rockford in the fall of 1853. In the spring of 1854, the Talcott brothers, Wait and Sylvester along with Jess Blinn and Ralph Emerson organized J.H. Manny & Co. Between 1855 and 1856 this new company manufactured about 6,000 machines for harvest.

== Lawsuit ==
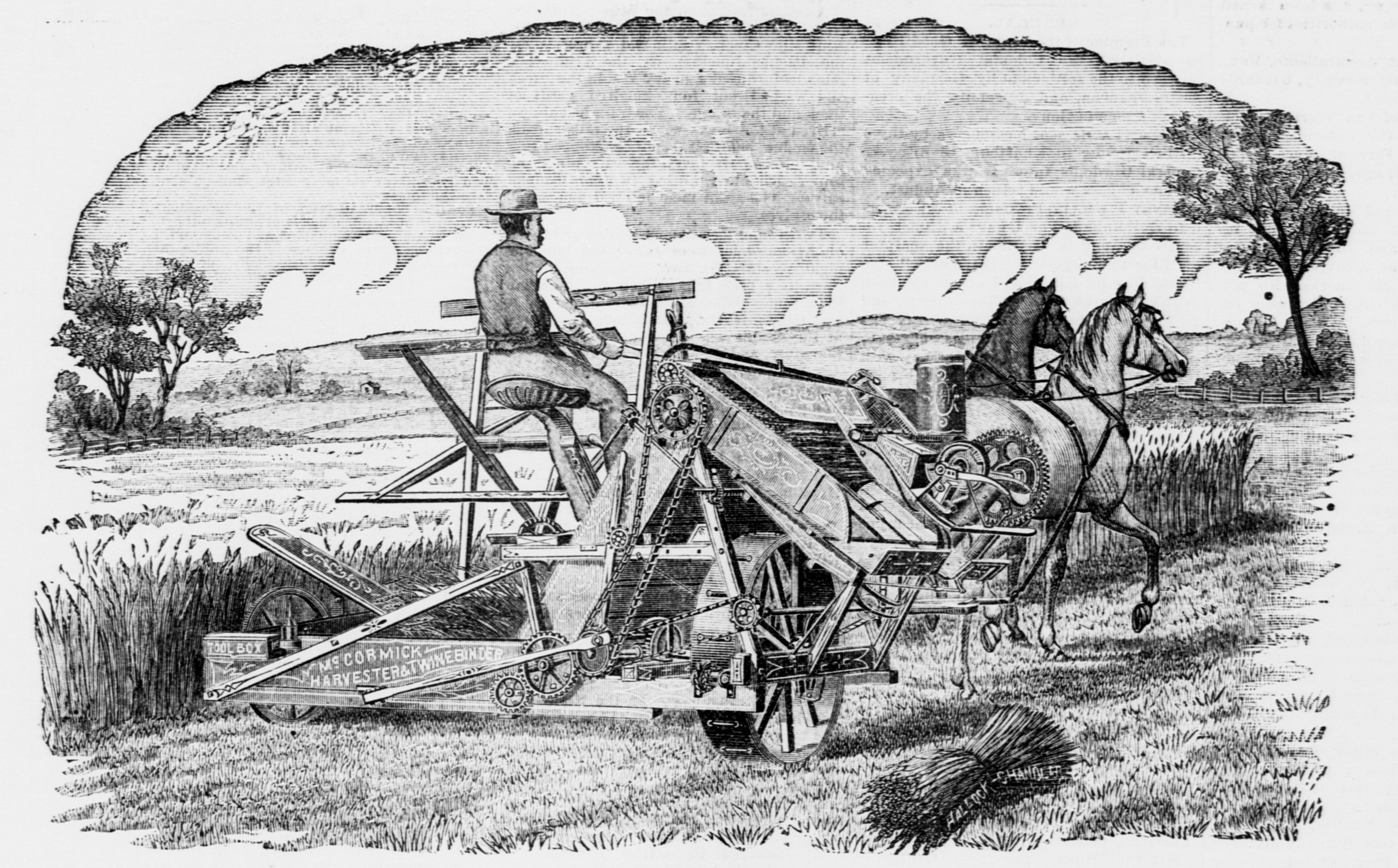
McCormick reaper and twine binder in 1884 that was part of the McCormick Reaper patent case

Cyrus McCormick filed a lawsuit against Manny for patent infringement in 1855, styled McCormick v. Manny. McCormick demanded that Manny stop producing reapers, and pay McCormick US$400,000. The trial, originally scheduled for Chicago, Illinois in September 1855, had prominent lawyers on both sides. McCormick hired former US Attorney General Reverdy Johnson and New York patent attorney Edward Nicholl Dickerson.

Manny hired Edwin M. Stanton who hired local Illinois lawyer Abraham Lincoln. However, the trial was moved to Cincinnati, Ohio. Although Manny won the case, with an opinion by Supreme Court Judge John McLean, Lincoln ended up not contributing to the defense. After later being elected president, Lincoln chose Stanton as his Secretary of War. See Abraham Lincoln's patent.

== Death ==
John H. Manny died in 1856 of a stomach illness and the manufacturing of his machine was then carried on by the Talcott brothers and Ralph Emerson until 1860, when Mr. Emerson bought out his partners and associated himself with William A. Talcott. Following the death of Manny the firm was known as Talcott, Emerson, & Co.

After Manny's death on January 31, 1856, McCormick appealed the case to the United States Supreme Court. McCormick lost again.

The firm meanwhile had continued to manufacture reapers as Talcott, Emerson & Company. In 1860 Emerson bought out the other partners, and then the name was changed back to Talcott, Emerson & Company about 1874. Emerson (who was a cousin of the poet Ralph Waldo Emerson) ran the company until it became Emerson-Brantingham in 1909 under the leadership of Charles S. Brantingham. The company purchased a number of other manufacturers including Reeves & Co, but by 1915 ran into financial difficulties. After a merger with the former D. M. Osborne company, in 1928 it was bought by J. I. Case Company, now Case Corporation.

Manny's widow married Robert Hall Tinker in 1870 and lived in the house now called Tinker Swiss Cottage.

John Henry Manny is sometimes confused with John Pels Manny, a cousin.

== Bibliography ==
- McCormick, Cyrus Hall III (1931), The Century of the Reaper, Houghton Mifflin, LCCN 31009940, OCLC 559717.
