= Milton Reeves =

Pioneer of the American automobile industry

Milton Othello Reeves
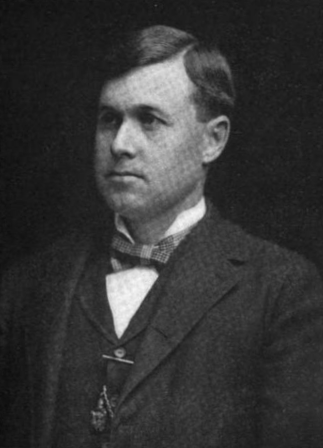
- Born: August 25, 1864; Rush County, Indiana
- Died: June 4, 1925 (aged 60); Columbus, Indiana
- Known for: Octo-Auto and Sexto-Auto
- Spouse: Amanda Melvina Kirkpatrick
- Parent(s): William Franklin Reeves; Hannah M. Gilson

Milton Othello Reeves (August 25, 1864 – June 4, 1925) was an early pioneer of the American automobile industry. He held more than 100 patents.

== Biography ==
He was born on a farm in Rush County, Indiana, on August 25, 1864, to William Franklin Reeves and Hannah M. Gilson and educated in Knightstown. He married Amanda Melvina Kirkpatrick in 1882. Reeves died on June 4, 1925, in Columbus, Indiana, aged 60. He was buried in Columbus City Cemetery in Columbus, Indiana.

In 1879 Reeves worked in a sawmill in Columbus. He noticed that workers could not control the speed of the pulleys used to power the saws. This caused the wood to split and a large amount of wastage. After some months of study and experimentation, Reeves invented a variable-speed transmission to control the saws' speed.

In 1888 Reeves and his brothers, Marshal and Girney, purchased the Edinburg Pulley Company and renamed it the Reeves Pulley Company. Marshal was the driving force behind this venture having first invented a tongueless corn plow in 1869, and in 1875, he formed the Hoosier Boy Cultivator Company with his father and uncle. In 1879 the company name was changed to Reeves & Co.

Reeves, with his interest in motor vehicles, began to develop a motocycle and in so doing adapted his variable speed transmission in 1896. The transmission became a product line in its own right for the Reeves Pulley Company because of its multiple applications.

== Motocycle and muffler ==
Reeves is credited as building either the fourth or fifth American automobile, called at the time a motocycle. It had a belt and pulley based variable speed transmission which he believed made it superior to Henry Ford's Quadricycle with only one speed. The motocycle was four-wheeled and powered by a two-cylinder, two cycle, six horsepower Sintz Gas Engine Company engine. The coach was made by the Fehring Carriage Company. The Sintz engine proved unreliable and Reeves created his own air cooled model, probably in 1897/1898.

His first recorded test of his motocycle's transmission took place on September 26, 1896. To overcome noise and fumes of the engine, Reeves created a double muffler, an industry first. Reeves and his brother lodged the muffler patent in 1897. That same year he introduced a new improved version of the motocycle. The car was driven to Indianapolis and attained a top speed of 15 mph. It was reported as the first auto in the city. In a later test the vehicle attained 30 mph. By 1898, Reeves had lost momentum and was discouraged, probably by the almost complete lack of sales. Only five are thought to have been sold. By 1899 Reeves' brothers were no longer supporting the motocycle's development mainly because of the lack of reliable engines.

== Reeves automobile ==
Reeves continued to work on developing a car and by 1904 had convinced his brothers to back another attempt. He made four Model D and six Model E cars by 1905. The D had a 12 hp engine and the E an 18-20 hp engine. In 1905 he produced an air cooled, valve in head motor with individually cast cylinders, splash lubrication, and intake and exhaust manifolds on opposite sides. That year Reeves obtained a contract for 500 of these engines from the Aerocar Company and by 1906 was making 15 engines a week. 1906 saw the introduction of a water cooled model and the Model J engined car the Reeves Go-Buggy. The Model P engine was used in the Sears Motor Buggy. The engines continued to evolve until 1910 when the family again abandoned the idea because of the collapse of the Aerocar Company. Through this period Reeves had continued to make cars with the Model S and N being two of the types. The variable speed transmission continued to be made by the Reeves Pulley Company up until 1955 when it was acquired by the Reliance Electric Company, now part of the Baldor Electric Company.

Other auto companies using Reeves engines at various time during the period were Auburn, Autobug, Chatham, Mapleby, and Moon.

=== Octo-Auto and Sexto-Auto ===
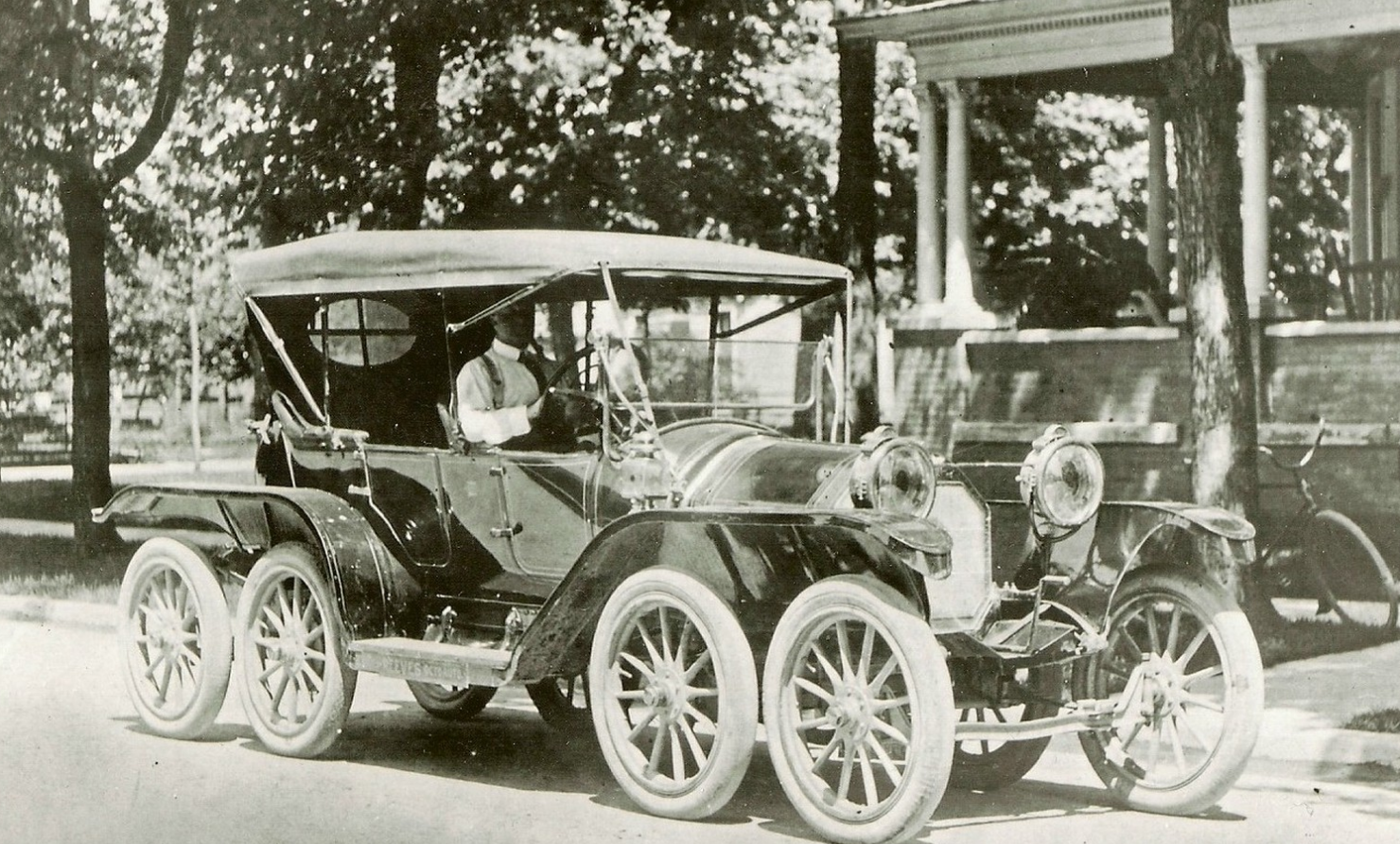
Octo-Auto, Milton Othello Reeves 1911

In 1911, Reeves founded the Reeves Sexto-Octo Company. He modified a 1910 model Overland by adding four extra wheels and calling it the Reeves Octo-Auto. Time Magazine has named this car as one of the ugliest ever produced. At the time, however, the Octo-Auto was hailed by writer and editor Elbert Hubbard for its comfort and durability. It had a 40-horsepower engine, was over 20 feet long, sat 4 passengers, and retailed for $3200.00. The Octo-Auto was notable or notorious enough for Hemmings to feature it in 2011 as an April Fools' Day article on its website titled World celebrates the centennial of the Octo-Auto.

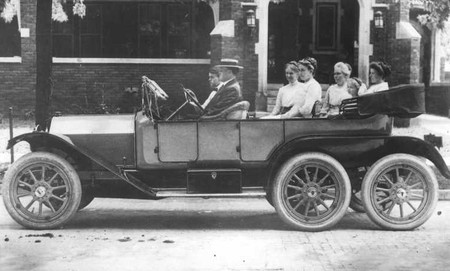
Milton Reeves driving his SextoAuto in 1912

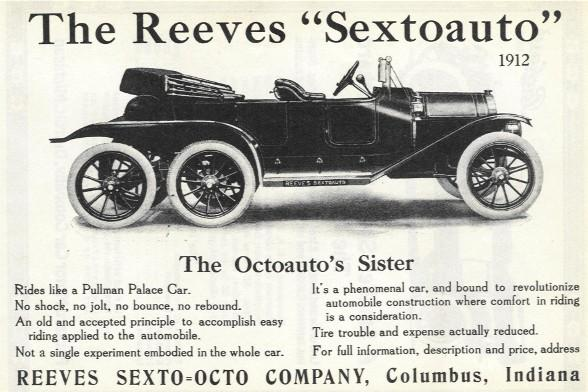
Reeves SextoAuto 1912

The Octo-Auto failed to sell and in 1912 Reeves created the Sexto-Auto, a six-wheel version. The first version was a modification of the Octo-Auto. The second attempt was built on a modified Stutz Motor Company chassis and was no more successful than the first attempt. It was a luxury car, had variable speed transmission and reportedly made several cross-country jaunts. With a price of $4,500 (over $100,000 in 2014 terms) it too never caught on with the American public.

In 1914 the Reeves Pulley Company decided to sell its engine business. The Cummings Machine Company of Minster, Ohio, was its purchaser in 1918.

== Buses ==
Reeves created a bus in 1896/97 with his second motocycle called "The Big Seven" for carrying seven adults. He followed this in 1898 with a 20 passenger vehicle, which he sold to a South Dakota businessman. Unfortunately its wheels were too far apart for the wagon wheel-ruts and it was returned to the company. It was then used on the Big Four Railroad from Columbus to Hope, Indiana.

His vehicles were not very successful but his variable speed transmission and muffler were.

== See also ==
- Reeves & Co.
