= Foos Gas Engine Company =

American gas engine manufacturer

- Industry: Manufacturing
- Founded: 1887
- Headquarters: Springfield, Ohio, United States
- Products: Gasoline engines.

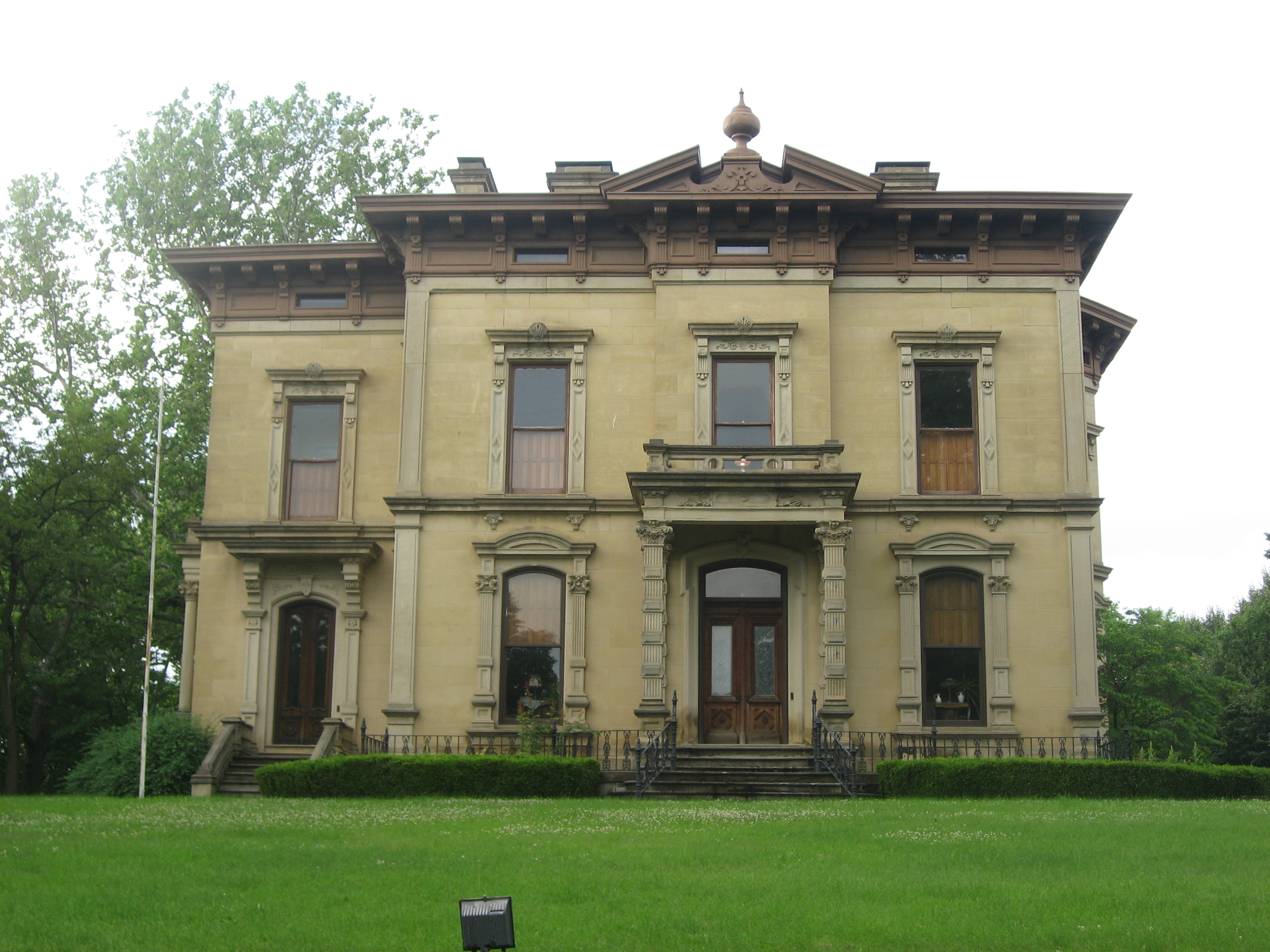
The Foos family home in Springfield

The Foos Gas Engine Company is a former American manufacturer of gasoline engines.

== Origins ==
Clark Sintz had been undertaking pioneering engine work both on his own and with Charles F Endter. In 1885 the Sintz Gas Engine Company demonstrated a small 2-cycle engine in a small boat. The engine was based on a Dugald Clerk design. Clerk was a Scottish engineer who had patented the engine in the 1870s. John Foos held the patent for this engine.

Foos developed his own improved version of Sintz's engine and established the Foos Gas Engine Company in 1887 in Springfield, Ohio. The Board consisted of Scipio E. Baker (President), Charles E. Patric (Vice President), Randolph Coleman (secretary) and Harry E. Snyder (CFO)

== Products ==
By 1900, the Foos Gas Engine Company claimed to be the largest engine manufacturer in the world. The company made stationary gas and oil engines in the late 1800s and early 1900s, gasoline powered traction engines up until at least 1905, and in the 1920s they made wood-sawing machines. Foos engines were sold globally. In the mid-1920's the company developed a diesel engine suitable for automobiles and other vehicles.

== Fulton Iron Works ==
The company continued to make engines until 1927, when it was sold to Fulton Iron Works of St Louis, Missouri. George Foos, John's son, was the company president at the time. John had died in 1908. Fulton continued making Foos engines in Springfield until 1942. They then transferred the engine-making to St Louis. Fulton's are now a subsidiary of South Side Machine Works.
