= Midmark =

American company

Midmark Corporation
- Type: Private
- Industry: Medical, dental, and veterinary products and services
- Founded: 1915
- Headquarters: Versailles, Ohio, U.S.
- Area served: Worldwide
- Key people: Jon Wells (CEO); John Dill (CFO)
Products
Products	Barrier-Free examination and procedures tables; Digital diagnostic devices; Software for EHR/EMRs; Casework; Sterilizers; Lighting; Seating; Dental operatories; Dental furniture; Dental casework; Dental imaging; Veterinary exam and treatment tables; Anesthesia and critical care products; Dental delivery systems
- Number of employees: 2,000
- Subsidiaries: Irvine, CA; Kansas City, KS; Glasgow, KY; Traverse City, MI; Tampa, FL; Leesburg, OH; Mumbai, India; Quattro Castella, Italy
- Website: https://www.midmark.com

Midmark Corporation is a private American company founded in 1915 as The Cummings Machine Company that manufactures medical, dental, and veterinary products and provides related services.

The company, with headquarters in Dayton, Ohio, has production and administrative offices in Versailles, Ohio, seven other locations in the US, one in Mumbai, India and one in Quattro Castella, Italy.

== History ==
Midmark, formerly The Cummings Machine Company, was founded in 1915, manufacturing cement mixers. In 1918, Cummings bought the Reeves Pulley Company's engine business. In 1919, the company expanded its product line to mining locomotives, foundry equipment, and custom metal fabrications, and became the Industrial Equipment Company. John Eiting was named president in 1925, the first member of the Eiting family to lead the company. John's son, Carl Eiting joined the company in 1930 and became president in 1953.

=== 1950 – 1979 ===
Carl's son, Jim Eiting, joined the company in 1956.

Midmark entered the medical industry in 1967 when it purchased the assets of the bankrupt American Metal Furniture Company. The company was then renamed IE Industries for "innovative engineering".

It also introduced a solid-frame hydrostatic trencher for cutting ditches for utility underground lines and general construction. These new product lines led to the creation of three product divisions: Midmark Medical, Midmark Power (trencher), and Midmark Steel (mining equipment and custom manufacturing). In 1978, IE Industries became Midmark Corporation.

=== 1980 – 1999 ===
Midmark purchased the Ritter line of medical equipment from Sybron in 1986, then designed and developed casework and sterilizers for the medical and dental markets.

Jim Eiting retired as chief executive in 1995.

As part of a global initiative, Midmark purchased the French holding company Arteme and its subsidiaries Promotal and Beaumond, located in Ernée, France, in 1998.

=== Since 2000 ===
In 2000, Jim Eiting's daughter Anne Eiting Klamar took over as president and CEO.

In 2010, Midmark partnered with Mortara Instrument in Milwaukee, Wisconsin, adding new products to its line of diagnostic devices.

Midmark moved its headquarters from Versailles, Ohio to the University of Dayton River Campus, Dayton, Ohio, in 2013, and moved again to Austin Landing in Miamisburg, Ohioin 2018.

In August 2019, the company acquired the True Definition intraoral scanner platform from 3M.

In April 2021, President Jon Wells took over from John Baumann. as CEO.

== Acquisitions ==
Midmark made several acquisitions to broaden each of its markets:

- Brentwood Medical Products, Torrance, California - digital diagnostic products
- Apollo Dental Products, Clovis, California - air compressors and evacuation systems for the dental market
- Matrx, Orchard Park, New York - air compressors and evacuation systems for dental and veterinary medicine
- DBL7, Fort Collins, Colorado - veterinary power examination and procedure tables, including the Canis Major Exam Lift Table
- European Design, Inc., Glasgow, Kentucky - a wood cabinetry company, was acquired in 2007.
- Sharn Veterinary, Inc., Tampa, Florida - monitoring and critical care equipment for animal healthcare under the Cardell, CardEx, and Versaflo brands
- Progeny, Inc., Lincolnshire, Illinois - radiographic imaging products for human and animal dental markets
- Newmed, S.r.L, Quattro Castella, Italy- tabletop sterilization products and accessories for the medical, dental, and animal health markets
- Schroer Manufacturing Company (Shor-Line) animal health equipment manufacturer. Kansas City, Kansas

In 1996, the company acquired Knight Manufacturing, Inc. in Asheville, North Carolina, expanding its product offerings in the dental market. In 1998, Midmark purchased the French holding company Arteme, a maker of primary and acute-care medical products.

- Brentwood Medical Products of Torrance, California, was purchased in 2000.
- In March 2009 Progeny, Inc. of Lincolnshire, Illinois, a radiographic imaging product for human and animal dental markets, was purchased.
- In 2010, Midmark acquired the majority equity position in Janak Healthcare Private Limited, and in 2014, took sole ownership of the company in Mumbai, India with manufacturing in Umargam, Gujarat.
- The company purchased a minority share in Cleveland Medical Devices in 2011.
- In May 2016, Midmark acquired Versus Technology, Inc., a maker of locating technology, badges, and software in Traverse City, Michigan, and VSSI Inc., a manufacturer of veterinary practice equipment in Carthage, Missouri
- In 2019, Midmark acquired Mason Company, an animal boarding and containment solutions company in Leesburg and Lebanon, Ohio
- Schroer Manufacturing Company (Shor-Line), a Kansas City, Kansas-based animal health equipment manufacturing company, was acquired in 2021.
- Netherlands-based Fortimedix was acquired in November 2024.

== Awards ==
- In 2008 Midmark was named one of the "Healthiest Companies in America" by Interactive Health Solutions (IHS).
- Midmark was the recipient of the Best-in-Class Award in 2009, 2010 and 2011 for achieving Best-in-Class status in the Electromedical product category. This award is determined through a combination of year-over-year market share growth and total market share.
- In 2011, Midmark was presented the Medical Design Excellence Award for its 625 Barrier-Free Examination table.
- In 2016, Midmark received a GOOD Design Award for its Artizan Dental Cabinetry.
- Midmark received a Certificate of Excellence in the 2016 American In-house Design Awards for its first iBook.
- In 2016, Midmark received a Dayton Business Journal Manufacturing Award for Workforce Training.
