= Pungs-Finch =

Defunct American motor vehicle manufacturer

Pungs-Finch Auto & Gas Engine Company
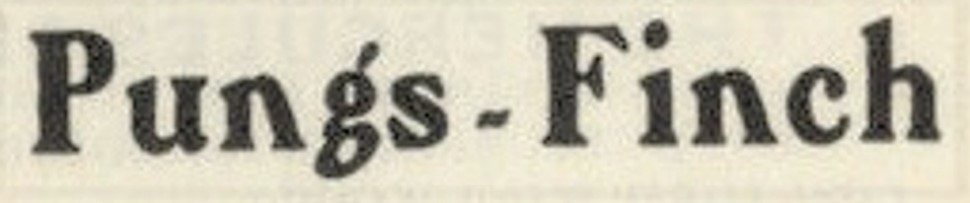

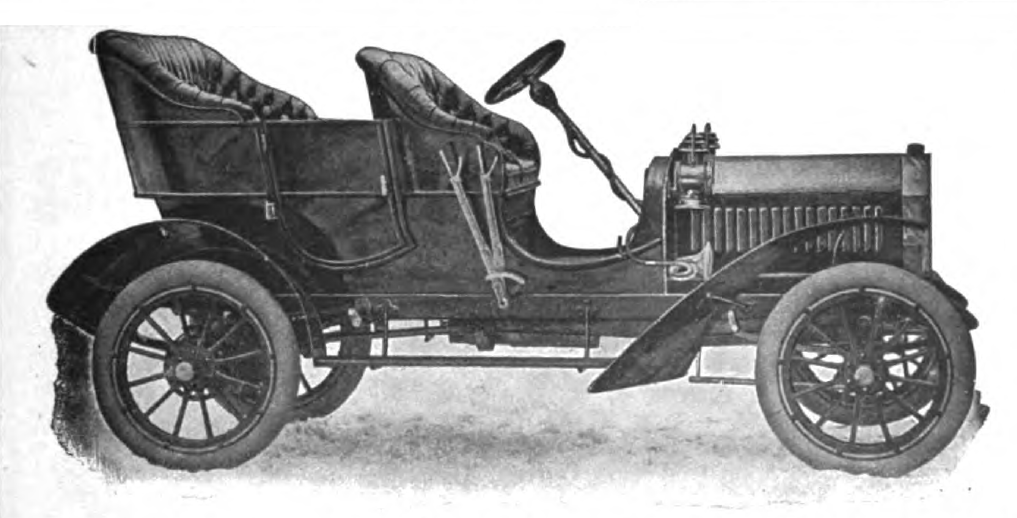
- 1906 Pungs-Finch Touring Car
- Formerly: Sintz Gas Engine Company
- Industry: Automotive
- Founded: 1904; 122 years ago
- Defunct: 1910; 116 years ago
- Fate: Discontinued automobile production
- Headquarters: Detroit, Michigan, United States
- Key people: William A. Pungs, E. B. Finch, D. C. Rexford
- Products: Automobiles Marine Engines

The Pungs-Finch was a brass era American automobile manufactured in Detroit, Michigan from 1904 to 1910. They were powerful touring cars built by a factory which primarily made marine gas engines.

== History ==
E. B. Finch was an engineer who had studied at the University of Michigan and who had built his first automobile in 1902. William A. Pungs was his father-in-law who had arranged the purchase of the Sintz Gas Engine Company for the Michigan Yacht and Power Company. Pungs bought out his partner O. J. Mulford, who departed and established the Gray Marine Motor Company in 1905. The new company was named the Pungs-Finch Auto and Gas Engine Company in 1904.

Sintz Gas Engine had developed a car that became the basis for the 1904 Pungs-Finch that had a 14-hp twin-cylinder engine. In 1905 the twin was replaced by the much larger Finch designed Model D 4-cylinder of 5,808-cc and the Model F of 6,435-cc, selling at $2,000 or $2,500 (equivalent to $89,583 in 2025) respectively. In 1906, the Model F was drastically revised. The displacement was now 3707 cc with a bore of 101.6 mm and a stroke of 114.3 mm. The wheelbase increased to 100 inches = 2540 mm. The Model F was produced until production was discontinued in 1910. The Pungs-Finch were displayed at the New York, Chicago and Detroit automobile shows in 1905. The Model H from 1907 had a displacement of 5808 cc with a bore of 120.65 mm and a stroke of 127 mm. The wheelbase was 110 inches = 2794 mm.

In 1905, the marine engine and boat building part of the factory burned and production was delayed while Pungs-Finch rebuilt. E. B. Finch designed a larger advanced model for 1906 called the Finch Limited powered by an 8652-cc single overhead camshaft, four-cylinder engine priced at $3,500, equivalent to $125,417 in 2025. It was guaranteed to be 50 horsepower and go 50 miles an hour. E. B. Finch departed in 1906 after an argument with his father-in-law and became a dealer for Chalmers in Cleveland. From 1906 to 1910 Pungs-Finch cataloged 22-hp and 40-hp models, again selling for $2,000 and $2,500 respectively. The 50-hp model was offered again in 1908 but by now the company concentrated their efforts on marine gas engines and boat building.

The 1906 model Finch Limited, probably the only one built, was discovered in a factory and restored by automobile historian Henry Austin Clark Jr. in the 1950s. It is the only known extant Pungs-Finch.

== Advertisements ==
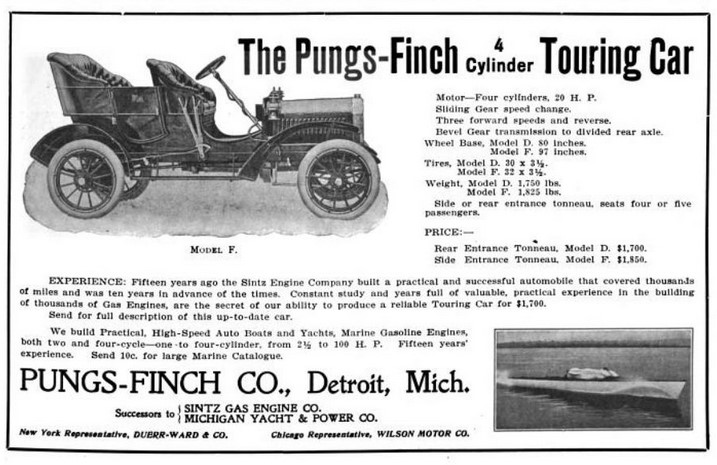
1904 Pungs-Finch advertisement in Motor World Magazine

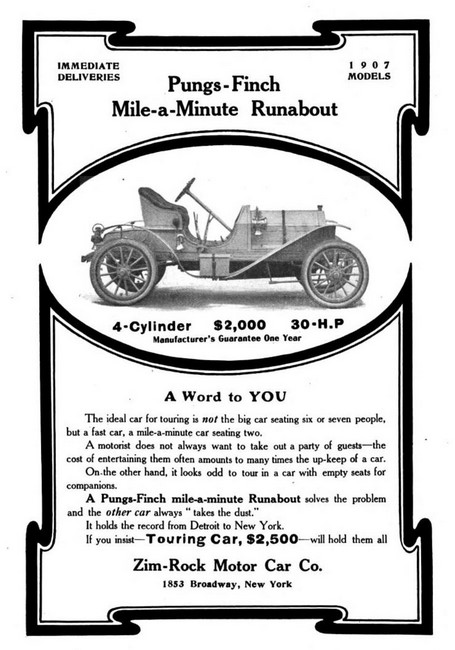
1906 Pungs-Finch advertisement

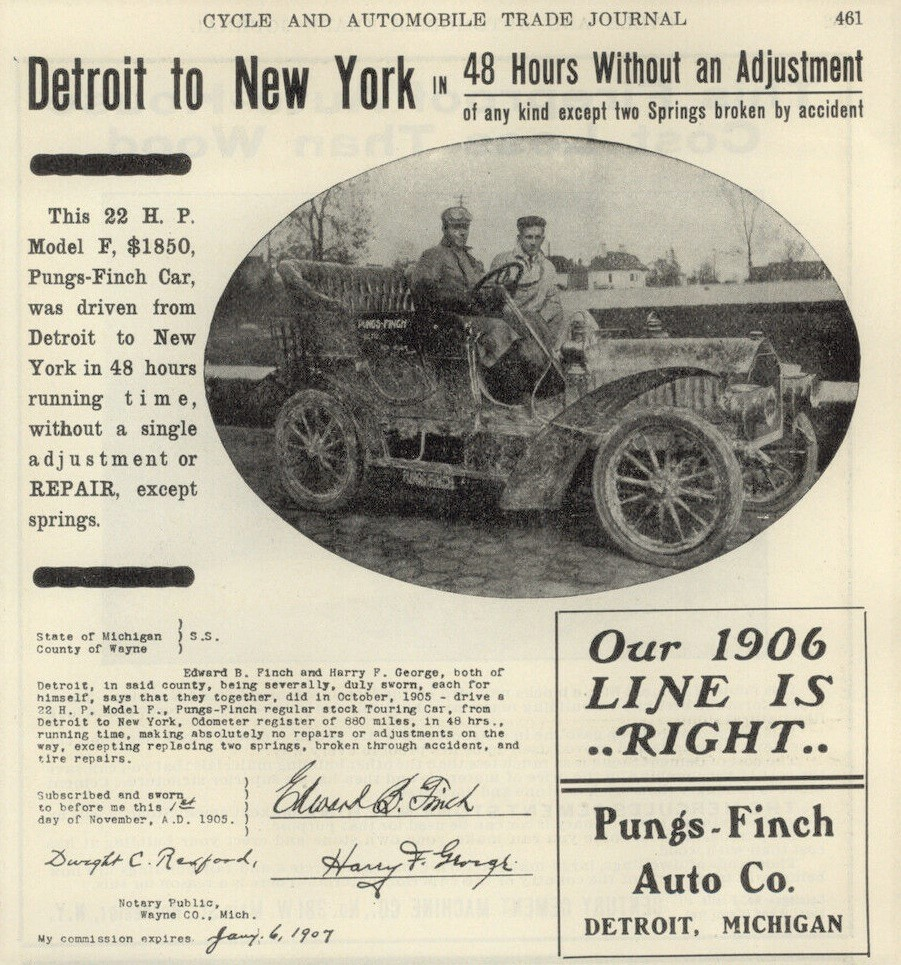
1907 Pungs-Finch advertisement - Cycle and Automobile Trade Journal

== See also ==
- Audrain Auto Museum - 1906 Pungs-Finch
- Pungs-Finch at ConceptCarz
