= Wait Talcott =

American politician

Member of the Illinois Senate from the 3rd district
- In office 1854 – 1858
- Preceded by: Thomas B. Talcott
- Succeeded by: Zenas Aplington

Personal details
- Born: October 17, 1807 Hebron, Connecticut
- Died: November 7, 1890 (aged 83) Rockford, Illinois
- Party: Republican
- Profession: Industrialist

Wait Talcott was an American industrialist and politician from Connecticut. He co-founded John H. Manny Combined Reaper & Mower in Rockford, Illinois, which became a major manufacturer in Rockford, Illinois. He served in the Illinois Senate from 1854 to 1858.

== Biography ==
Wait Talcott was born in Hebron, Connecticut on October 17, 1807. His family moved to Rome, New York three years later, where he spent most of his youth. In 1830, Talcott opened a mercantile business in Utica, New York, then emigrated to Rockton, Illinois in 1838. In 1854, he partnered with John Henry Manny, who invented a reaper. John H. Manny Combined Reaper & Mower, later known as Emerson, Talcott & Co., produced 1,100 reapers in its first year, expanding to 5,000 units by 1857. Cyrus McCormick sued the company for patent infringement, and the company hired patent attorney Abraham Lincoln to defend him. However, before the trial started, Lincoln was replaced by Edwin M. Stanton and George Harding.

An abolitionist, Talcott ran for United States Congress in 1846 with the Liberty Party, receiving about 500 votes. Following the dissolution of the party, he joined the Republicans and was elected to the Illinois Senate in 1854, serving one four-year term, taking over from his brother Thomas B. Talcott. President Abraham Lincoln appointed Talcott the Collector of Internal Revenue for the 2nd Illinois District. He held this position for five years. Following Lincoln's assassination, Talcott was appointed an official mourner from the State of Illinois. Later in his life, Talcott oversaw the Winnebago County Early Settlers' Society. He co-founded Beloit College and the Rockford Female Seminary, later known as Rockford University. He died on June 7, 1890.
