= Motocycle =

Archaic synonym for automobile

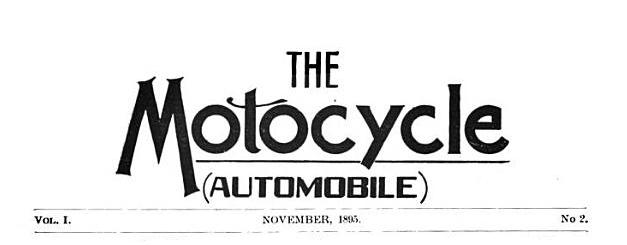
Motocycle magazine, Nov. 1895

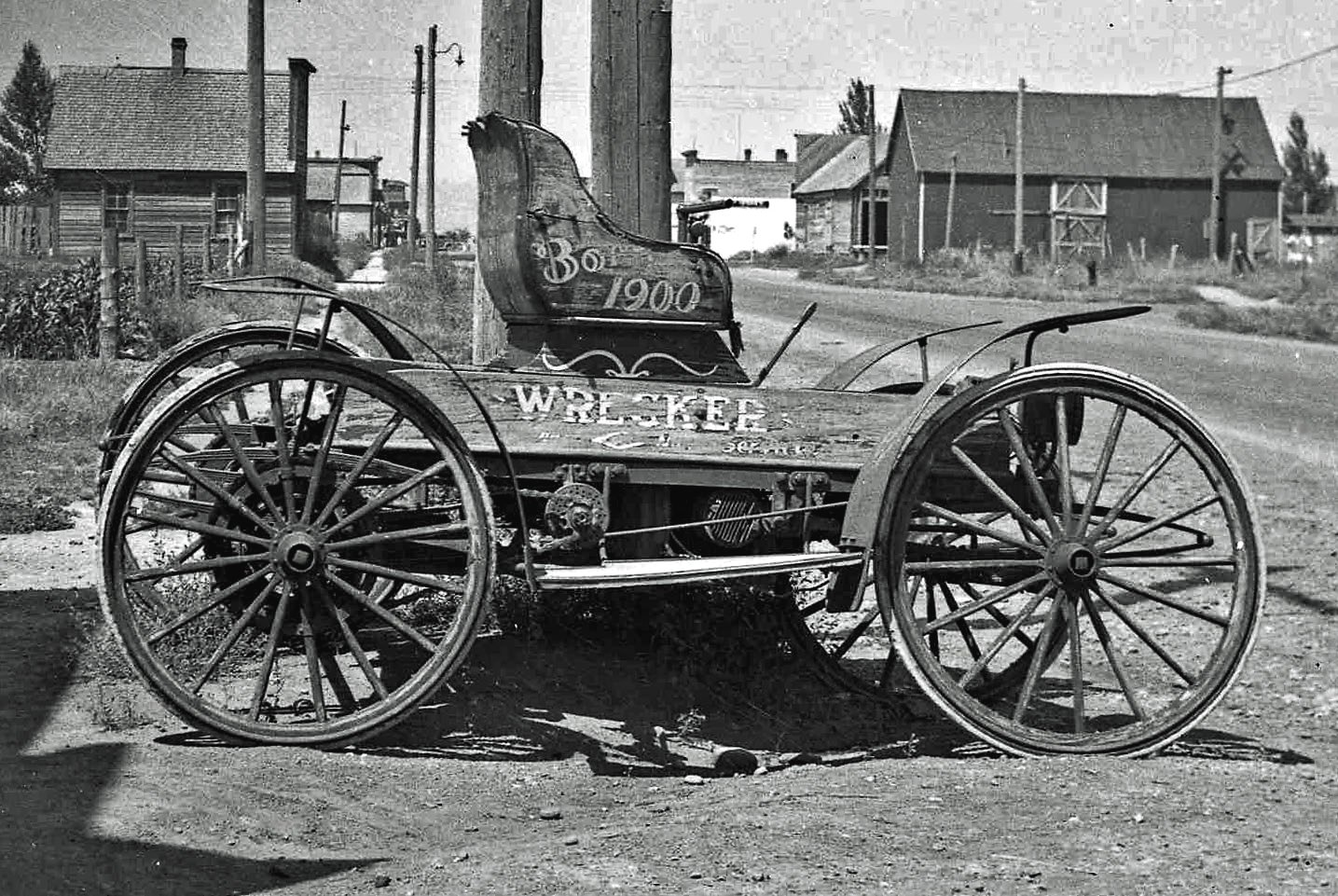
1900 Horseless carriage

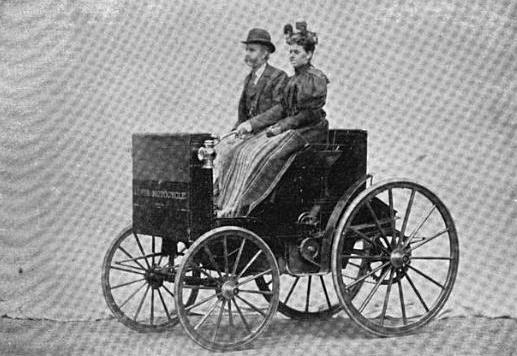
The Lewis "Motocycle"

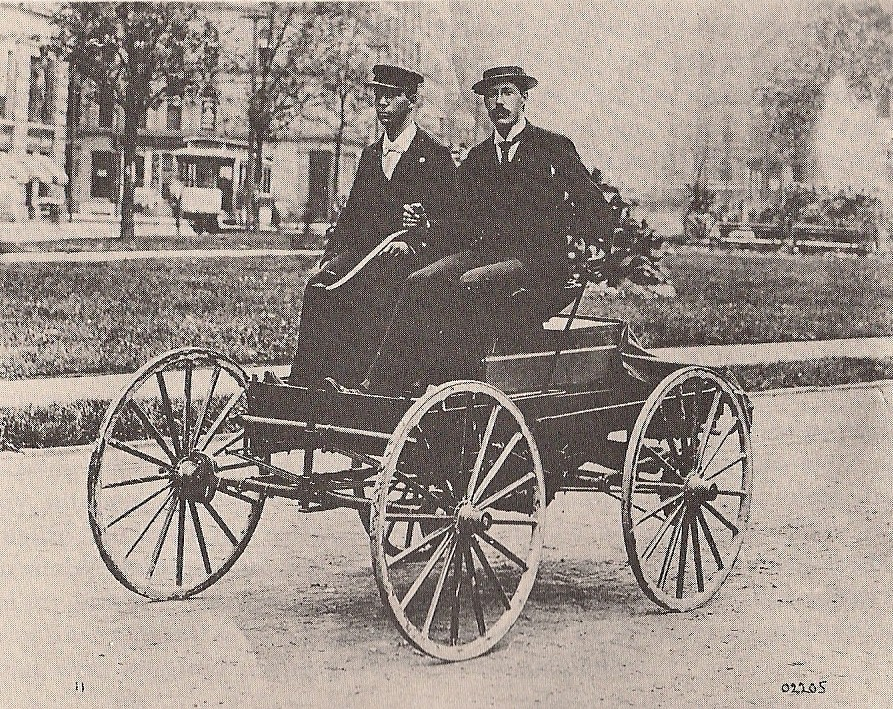
Charles B. King's motocycle, 1896

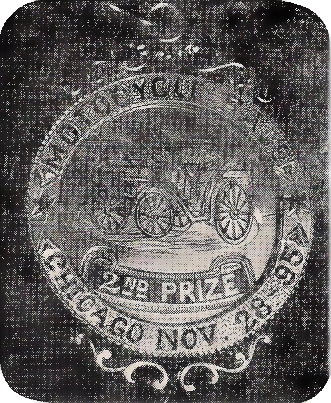
Gold Medal award for 2nd Prize of America's first automobile race in Chicago on November 28, 1895, reads "Motocycle Race, 2nd Prize, Chicago Nov 28 1895". Reverse side says "Presented to Charles B. King, Umpire by H. Mueller Mfg. Co. Decatur, Ill."

Motocycle was a word used in the United States in the latter part of the 19th century for a horseless carriage, the type of vehicle now known as a car or automobile. The word caught on initially as it was short and easier to understand than other possibilities, such as "automobile carriage", "motor carriage", "motor vehicle", or "auto carriage". It is now archaic and rarely used. The term "motor vehicle" is currently used in legal, transportation planning and academic terminology.

== First uses ==
One of the first publications of the word "motocycle" in the United States was when The Chicago Times-Herald reported on November 29, 1895, of America's first automobile race the day before

The Times-Herald motocycle race was run yesterday.

Herman H. Kohlsaat, owner of the Times-Herald, and Frederick Upham Adams, a local writer with a mechanical engineering interest, ran a public contest for someone to come up with a unique name to replace "horseless carriage" that represented the new motorized transport. The $500 prize for the new name went to the general manager of the New York Telephone Company for the name "motocycle" in 1895. He suggested the name "motocycle" as being as close to a correct definition as sounding good to defining exactly what it was. He is credited as the first to coin this name that would replace "horseless carriage." It was used then for reports on The Times-Herald's first automobile race. The name received little public enthusiasm and by the end of the nineteenth century went into discontinuance.

== Later uses ==
Starting in the twentieth century the name "automobile" became popular instead of motocycle in the United States and in Great Britain the motocycle became "motorcar" or "autocar".

Charles Brady King intended to enter a "horseless carriage" in the 1895 Times-Herald race, but wrote to Adams that although he intended to enter a motocycle with four wheels and a 4-horsepower 100-pound engine, it wasn't quite ready and he would have to withdraw. His motocycle could carry four persons, but for the race there would have been only two in the vehicle to reduce the weight and gain speed. His lightweight motocycle came in at 675 pounds, could seat four people plus cargo, and would probably sell for about $600 in a large quantity production. His motocycle dream, however, did not flourish and was realized by Ford and Olds instead.

In 1898 "Modern machinery" magazine pointed out the merits of gasoline-, electric- and steam-propelled 4-wheeled motocycles (automobiles).

== Legal ==
The term "motor vehicle" is defined in legal terms as most self-powered vehicles (i.e. automobiles, motorcycles, trucks, recreational vehicles) on public highways, no matter how many wheels it has or how many passengers it can carry or how much freight it can transport. In the United States these "motor vehicles" are registered with the local state Department of Motor Vehicles or Secretary of State.

== See also ==
- Quadricycle
- American Motor League

== Primary sources ==
- King, Charles B., A Golden Anniversary 1895-1945 / Personal Side Lights of America's First Automobile Race, Privately Printed by King 1945, Press work by Super-Power Printing Company, New York City

== Secondary sources ==
- May, George S., A most unique machine: the Michigan origins of the American automobile industry, Eerdmans, 1975
- May, George S., Encyclopedia of American Business History and Biography, Bruccoli Clark Layman, 1990, ISBN 0-8160-2084-1
- McComb, F. Wilson, Behind the wheel: the magic and manners of early motoring, Paddington Press, 1977
- Sturmey, Henry, The Autocar: a journal published in the interests of the mechanically propelled road carriage, Volume 1, Iliffe, sons & Sturmey ltd., 1896
- World Book Inc., The World Book Dictionary, Volume 2, World Book 2006, ISBN 0-7166-0299-7
