= Emerson-Brantingham Company =

American agricultural machinery manufacturer (1909–1928)

- Type: Defunct
- Industry: Agricultural machinery
- Predecessor: Emerson Manufacturing Company
- Founded: 1909
- Defunct: 1928
- Fate: Acquired by J. I. Case Company
- Headquarters: Rockford, Illinois, United States
- Key people: Charles S. Brantingham
- Products: Tractors, plows, threshers, harvesters, and engines

The Emerson-Brantingham Company was an American manufacturer of agricultural machinery based in Rockford, Illinois. It was organized in 1909 as a reorganization of the Emerson Manufacturing Company and expanded by acquiring manufacturers of tractors, engines, threshers, harvesting equipment, and horse-drawn implements. J. I. Case Company acquired the business in 1928.

== History ==
=== Predecessors and organization ===
The company's manufacturing lineage began with J. H. Manny & Company, which John H. Manny organized in 1852 to produce his reaper and other farm implements. Ralph Emerson joined the business as an investor and co-owner in 1854. After Manny died in 1856, Emerson and Waite Talcott took control of the enterprise, which eventually operated as the Emerson Manufacturing Company. Under Emerson, it developed a broad line of tillage and threshing equipment and sold machinery in domestic and international markets.

Charles S. Brantingham rose through the company and became president when the business was reorganized as the Emerson-Brantingham Company in 1909. He pursued growth by buying established manufacturers rather than developing every new product line within the company.

=== Expansion ===
In 1912, Emerson-Brantingham acquired eight companies. Its purchases included Reeves & Company, the Geiser Manufacturing Company, the Gas Traction Company, Rockford Gas Engine Works, the La Crosse Hay Tool Company, the Pontiac Buggy Company, the Newton Wagon Company, and the American Drill Company. The acquisitions added threshers, sawmills, stationary and traction engines, tractors, wagons, grain drills, and forage equipment to its product range. Emerson-Brantingham generally continued using the acquired companies' established product names.

The company acquired the Osborne line of harvesting machinery in 1918 after International Harvester divested it as part of an antitrust settlement. Osborne's mowers, reapers, and binders expanded Emerson-Brantingham's harvesting-equipment business and its eastern manufacturing and distribution network.

=== Tractors and acquisition by Case ===
Emerson-Brantingham introduced its first original tractor design, the three-wheeled Model L, in 1916. It produced 12 drawbar horsepower and 20 belt horsepower and used a single rear drive wheel. The company followed it in 1917 with the four-wheeled Model 9-16 and Model Q 12-20, and later introduced additional tractors and a motor cultivator.

The company struggled as demand shifted away from steam traction engines and large tractors toward smaller machines. The agricultural downturn after World War I further reduced sales, and the company remained financially weak during the 1920s. J. I. Case acquired Emerson-Brantingham in 1928, adding its plows, mowers, grain binders, and hay equipment to the Case product line. The Rockford plant subsequently operated as the Rockford Works of J. I. Case.
