= Reeves & Co. =

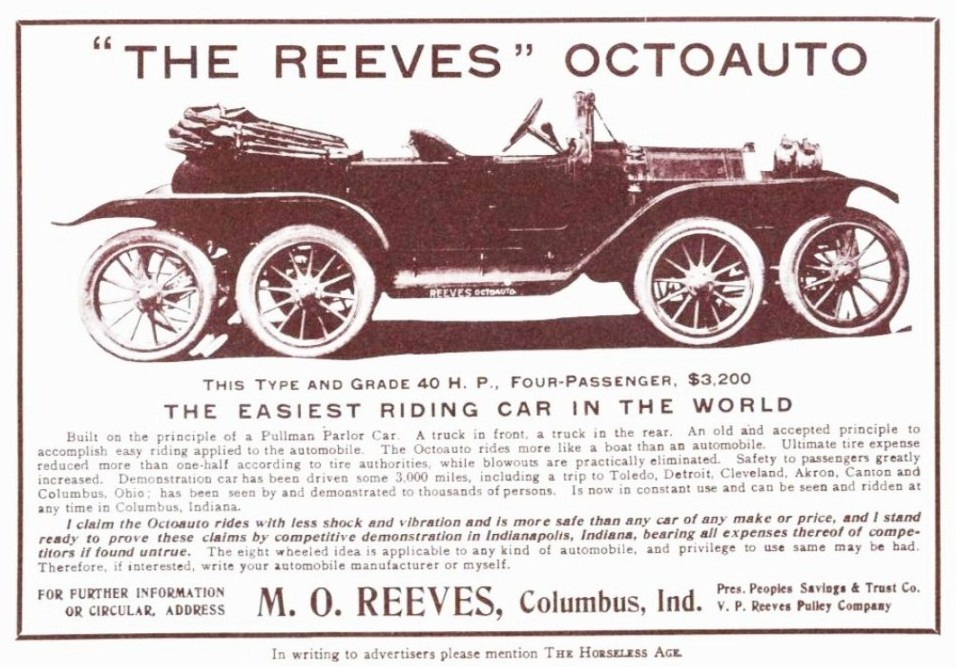
- Industry: Manufacturing
- Founded: 1875

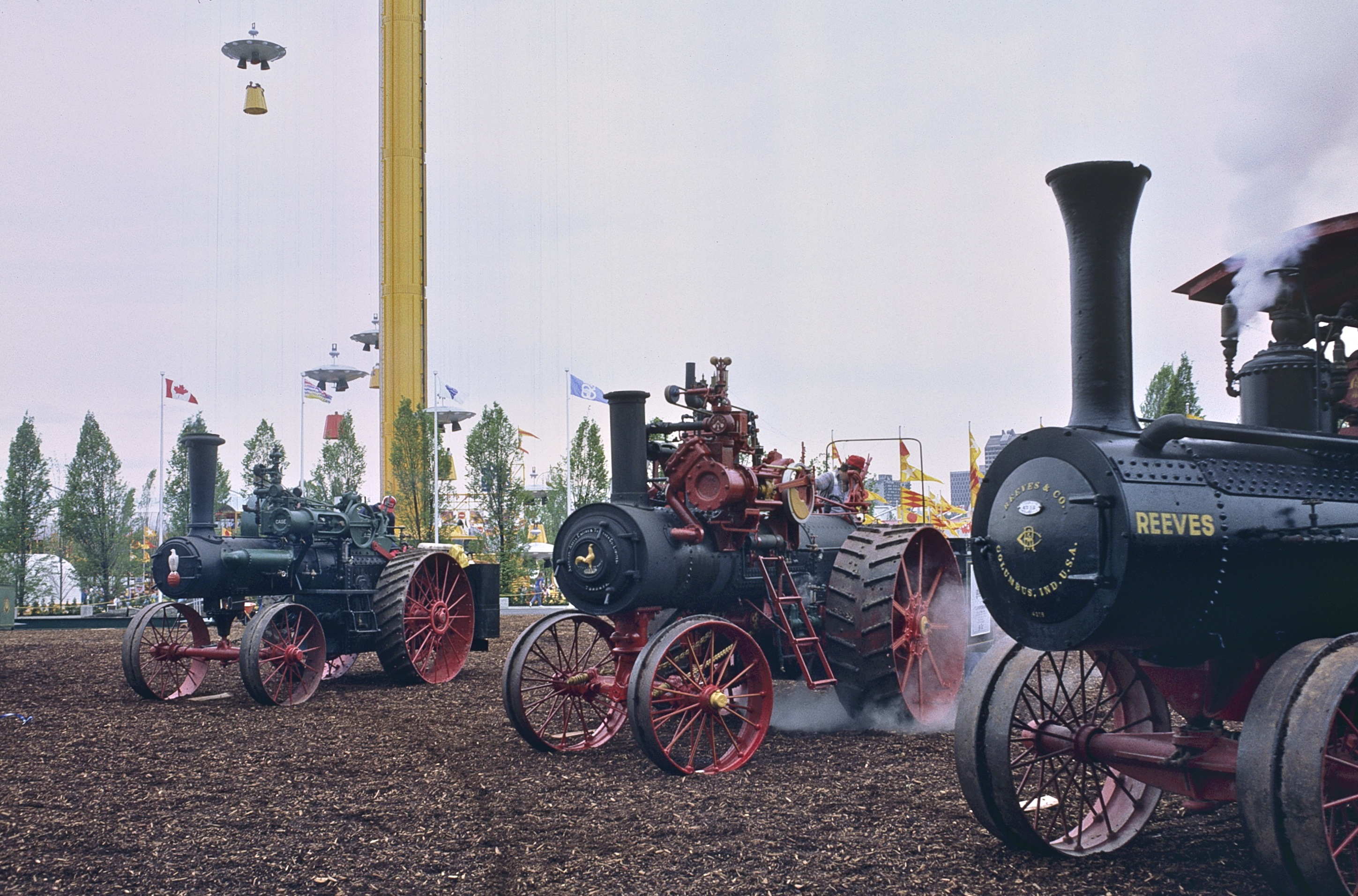
A Reeves-built steam tractor (at far right) being exhibited with other steam tractors at Expo 86

Reeves & Co. was an American farm tractor builder for 30 years, based in Columbus, Indiana. It built some of the largest steam traction engines used in North America.

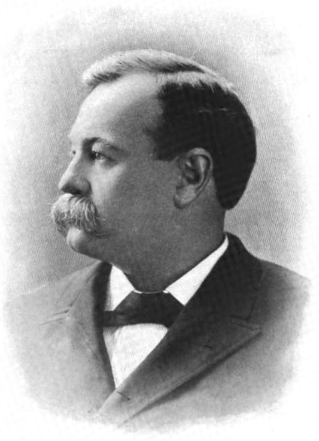
Marshall T. Reeves

== Hoosier Boy Cultivator Company ==
Marshal Reeves was the inventor of a two horse tongueless corn plow in 1869. In 1875 together with his father and uncle formed the Hoosier Boy Cultivator Company. In 1879, the company name was changed to Reeves & Company (abbreviated Reeves & Co.). Reeves went on to design and manufacture threshers, straw stackers, separators, corn shellers and clover hullers, holding more than 50 patents. At the same time as Marshal Reeves' brother Milton began making automobiles, in 1895, Reeves & Co. went into the steam engine business. They made engines in sizes from 13 HP to 40 HP (Nominal Horsepower).

== Steam traction engines ==
The company built steam plowing engines for the American and Canadian West and provided an engine and boiler approved by the provinces of Alberta and Saskatchewan. These new engines fulfilled these provinces' revised boiler laws enacted in 1910. There, steam breaking plows were needed to till the virgin soil.

The massive 40-120 (and later 140) HP engines were brought out in 1908 and their two stories height allowed the driver (engineer) to see over the cross-compound engine. They built engines in nominal horsepower sizes: 13 hp, 16 hp, 20 hp, 25 hp, 32 hp and 40 hp. The "140" referenced above was the "brake horsepower."

== Emerson-Brantingham ==
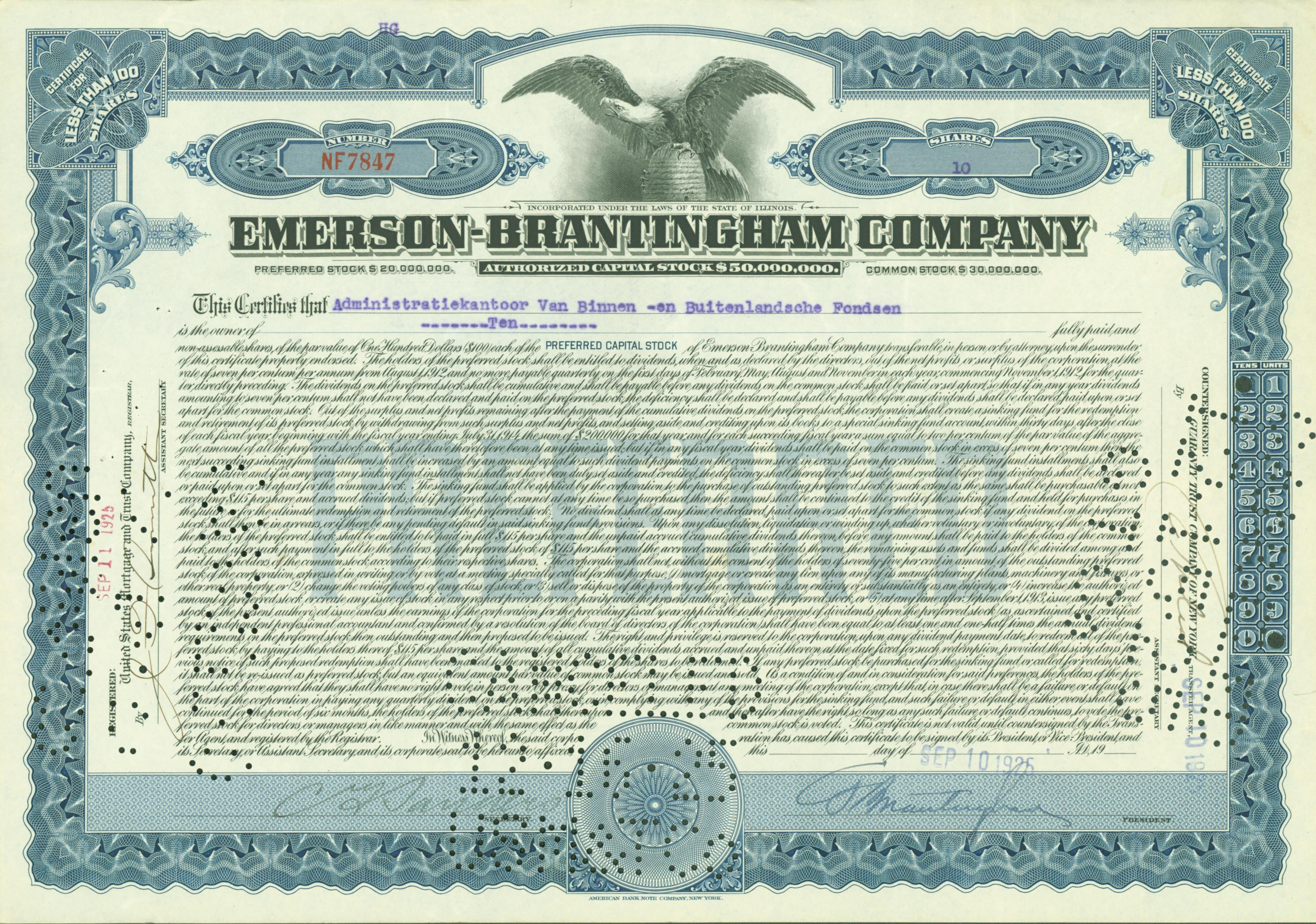
Preferred share of the Emerson-Brantingham Company, issued 10 September 1925

Reeves & Company was sold to Emerson-Brantingham on January 1, 1912. Emerson-Brantingham also acquired the Gas Traction Company, Rockford Engine Works, and the Geiser Manufacturing Co.; but by 1915 ran into financial difficulties. A couple years after a company reorganization, in 1928 all the farm equipment division assets were sold to J. I. Case Threshing Machine Company, now Case Corporation.

== Reeves & Company North Carolina ==
There was another Reeves & Company in North Carolina and Tennessee which made clocks in the 1820s. These two companies were not related.

== See also ==
- List of former tractor manufacturers
- List of traction engine manufacturers
- Milton Reeves
