= Sintz Gas Engine Company =

Defunct American motor vehicle manufacturer

The Sintz Gas Engine Company was formed in about 1885 by Clark Sintz and others in Springfield, Ohio. It was a pioneering marine engine manufacturing business that expanded into other fields. After its sale in 1902 to the Michigan Yacht and Power Company, Sintz ceased to exist in 1903 as an entity.

== Background ==
Clark Sintz had been undertaking pioneering engine work both on his own and with John F Endter. John Foos held the patent. In 1885 the company demonstrated a small 2-cycle engine in a small boat. The engine was based on a Dugald Clerk design. Clerk was a Scottish engineer who had patented the engine in the 1870s. Foos formed his own company, Foos Gas Engine Company, in 1889 using his own improved version of Clark Sintz's engine. In 1894 Elwood Haynes used a Sintz engine in his first car, as did Milton Reeves in 1896.

In 1894 Sintz sold his interest in the company and, together with his son, Claude formed the Wolverine Motor Works.

== Wolverine Motor Works ==
The Wolverine Motor Works initially was formed to make motor cars but instead began making marine engines for pleasure boats and in 1901 moved its marine engine manufacturing to Holland, Michigan. That same year Sintz sold the business to Charles Snyder. Sintz had been engaged by Snyder to design a small gauge railway for his banana plantation in Panama. Claude Sintz went on to make marine engines under his name from 1904 to 1907 and then founded The Sintz-Wallin Company of Grand Rapids. His early engines were two strokes with the brand name Leader. In 1913 Sintz-Wallin merged with the Midland Tractor Company and formed the Leader Gas Engine Company. In 1915 the Leader's moved to Quincy, Illinois, where they consolidated along with Dayton Foundry and Machine Company and Hayton Pump Company into Dayton-Dick Company. Dayton-Dick became Dayton-Dowd in 1919 and ceased making tractors in 1924. The pump manufacturing business continued until 1945 when it was acquired by the Peerless Pump Company. Peerless is now owned by Grundfos.

== Cars ==
From 1899 to 1903 the Sintz company produced cars of numerous styles. It also produced rail cars and light trams. All were powered by an own-make two-stroke engine.

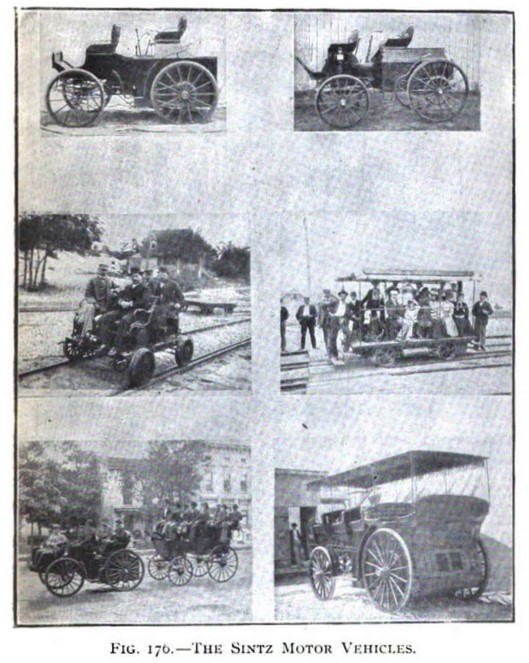
Sintz vehicles shown in Horseless Vehicles, Automobile, Motor Cycles by Gardner Dexter Hiscox, 1901

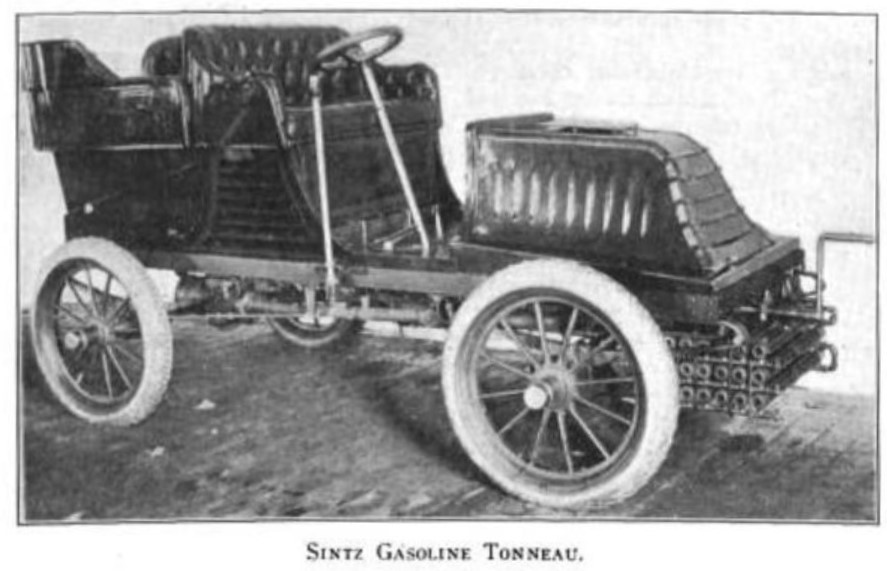
1903 Sintz Tonneau in Horseless Age, January 1903

== Michigan Yacht and Power Company ==
In about 1890 O J Mulford, W A Pungs, and a Mr Seymour formed the Michigan Yacht and Power Company in Detroit. They made small power boats and were distributors of the Sintz marine engines. In 1901 or 1902, Michigan Yacht and Power Company purchased the Sintz company and moved it to Detroit. In late 1903 Sintz ceased to exist as an entity. The new company was named the Pungs-Finch Auto and Gas Engine Company in 1904. Pungs bought out his partner O. J. Mulford, who departed and established the Gray Marine Motor Company in 1905. Gray Marine Motor Company renamed again in 1911 as Gray Motor Company, reformed in 1924 as Gray Marine Motor Company, and eventually acquired by Continental in 1944.
