= Pennant =

Pennant may refer to:

== Flag or banner ==
- Pennon (or pennant), a narrow, tapering flag
  - Commissioning pennant, the traditional sign of a warship, flown from its masthead while the ship is in commission
  - Broad pennant, flown from the masthead of a British Royal Navy ship to indicate the presence of a commodore on board
  - Pennant (church), flown by navies during services on board ships
- Pennant number, a number used to identify ships by the British Royal Navy and other navies of Europe and the Commonwealth
- Pennant (sports), a commemorative flag displayed or flown by a league-winning team
  - Pennant race, the race to clinch the division title in a regular baseball season
- Pennant (military), a tapering flag historically carried for identification purposes by cavalry detachments, attached to lances or standard poles.
- Pennant, a reference to Flag and pennant patterns in technical analysis of a stock market chart

== Places ==
- Pennant, Ceredigion, Wales
- Pennant, Powys, Wales
- Pennant, Saskatchewan, Canada
- Pennant Point, Nova Scotia, Canada
- Pennant Hills, New South Wales, Australia

== People ==
- Dafydd Pennant (16th century), Welsh poet
- Edward Douglas-Pennant (disambiguation)
- George Hay Dawkins-Pennant (1764–1840), plantation and slave owner
- George Douglas-Pennant, 2nd Baron Penrhyn
- Jermaine Pennant (born 1983), English former professional footballer
- Richard Pennant, 1st Baron Penrhyn (1737–1808), British politician and owner of sugar plantations in Jamaica
- Thomas Pennant (1726–1798), Welsh writer, naturalist and antiquarian
- Pennant Roberts (1940–2010), British television director and producer

== Other ==
- Pennant, the common name of the dragonfly genus Celithemis
- Pennant (automobile) (1924–25), manufactured by the Barley Motor Car Co. in Kalamazoo, Michigan, US
- The Pennant, a newspaper in Penola, South Australia
- Vympel, Russian for "Pennant", a Spetznas unit specialised in infiltration and assassination
- Pennant Measures, a stratigraphic division of the South Wales Coal Measures and including the Pennant Sandstone
- Pennant station, a light rail station in Pittsburgh, Pennsylvania, United States
