= Barley Motor Car Co. =

Automobile manufacturer

Barley Motor Car Company Roamer Motor Car Company
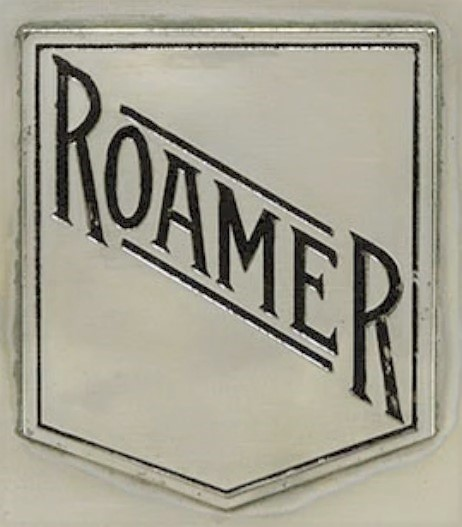
- America's Smartest Car
- Industry: Automotive
- Founded: 1916; 110 years ago
- Founder: Albert C. Barley
- Defunct: 1929; 97 years ago
- Fate: Closed
- Headquarters: Streator, Illinois and then Kalamazoo, Michigan, United States
- Key people: Albert C. Barley, Cloyd Y. Kenworthy, Karl H. Martin, L. F. Godspeed, George P. Wigginton
- Products: Automobiles
- Production output: 11,653 (1916-1929)
- Brands: Roamer, Barley, Pennant

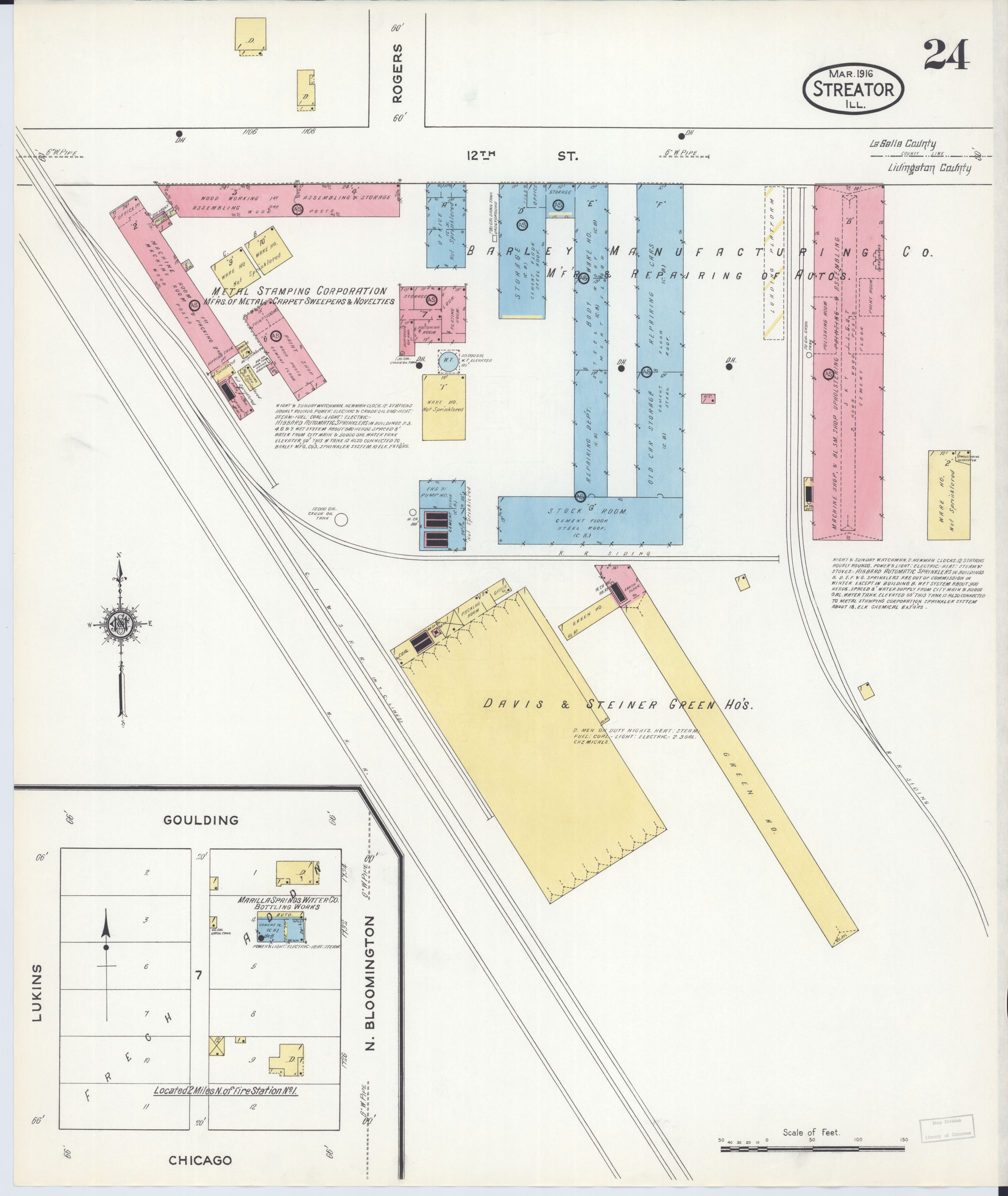
Barley Plant in 1916

Barley Motor Car Co. was a manufacturer of luxury automobiles in Kalamazoo, Michigan, and Streator, Illinois. It manufactured the Roamer automobile (1916–29) and briefly, the Barley (1922–24), and the Pennant (1924–25).

== History ==
In 1913 Albert C. Barley bought the assets of the Streator Motor Car Company, which entered receivership in 1911. Streator was the successor of the Erie Motor Carriage Company and had been manufacturing the Halladay automobile since 1905. Barley's new company was called Barley Manufacturing Company. From the factory at Streator, Illinois, he continued production of the Halladay.

=== Roamer Motor Car ===
Cloyd Y. Kenworthy, a New York City auto dealer then selling Rauch and Lang electric automobiles, wanted to expand into gasoline automobiles and approached A. C. Barley about producing an upscale automobile. Barley, Kenworthy and Karl H. Martin, who later developed the Wasp automobile, decided to build a luxury automobile and incorporated Barley Motor Car Company in New York in September 1916 with a capitalization of $50,000. Shortly thereafter, the company issued more classes of stock and was recapitalized with an additional $760,000, obtaining the existing assets of Barley Manufacturing Company.

The Hallady and its Streator, Illinois factory were sold. In 1917 manufacturing was moved to Kalamazoo, occupying the former Michigan Buggy factory where the Michigan and Greyhound automobiles had been built.

The Roamer introduced in 1916 was designed by Karl H. Martin. The Roamer name was suggested by Kenworthy's chauffeur after a popular racing horse of the era. The car was stylish; the grill was nickel-plated and modeled after the Rolls-Royce. The initial model, the Roamer Six, was a four-door tourer with a 24-hp (18 kW) 6-cylinder Continental engine.

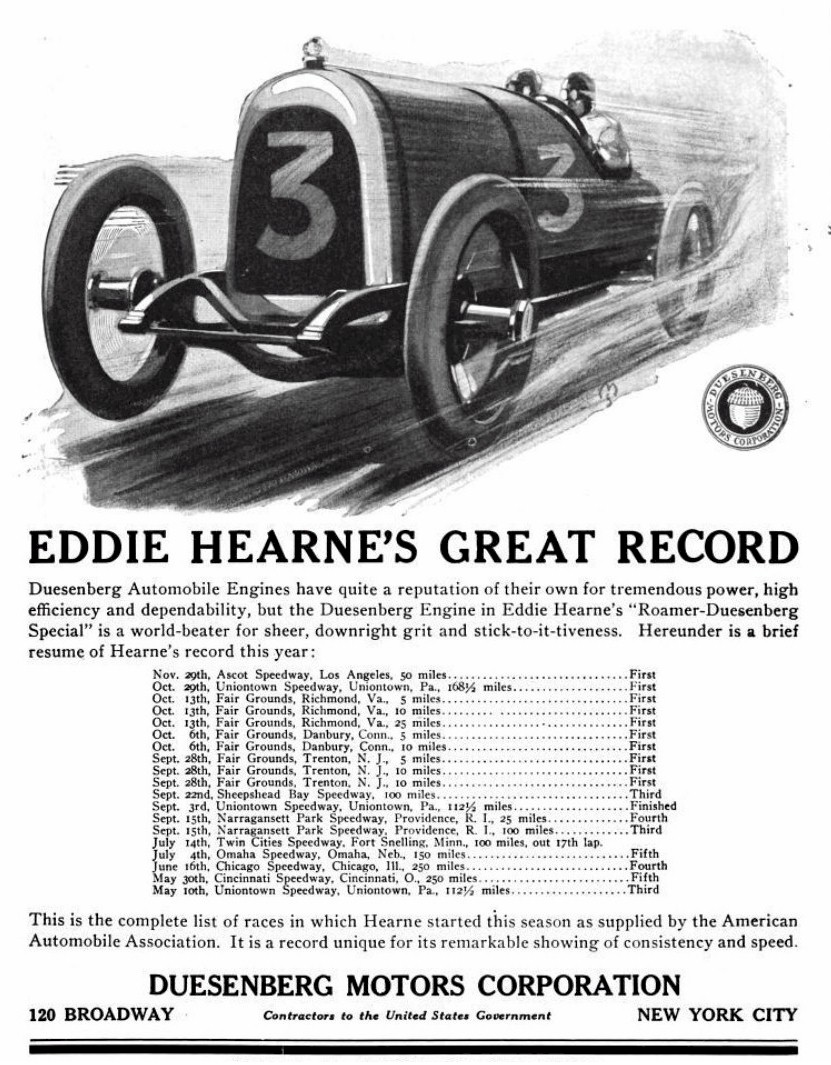
Eddie Hearne's Roamer-Duesenberg track records from an advertisement

The Roamer was marketed from its inception as "America’s Smartest Car." It was also successful in many early racing events. A Roamer with a Rochester-Duesenberg engine driven by chief engineer L. F. Godspeed and Eddie Hearne set six records for one kilometer and one through five-mile sprints at Daytona Beach in 1921. The advertisements crowed, "America’s Smartest Car Makes America’s Fastest Mile."

In 1918 the Model C6 succeeded the Six, with a 54-hp (40 kW) Continental 12XD engine and available in eight body styles from $2,200 to $4,900, equivalent to $104,884 in 2025.Roamer offered custom colors to be chosen by the buyer. In 1920 the Model D4 Touring had a 75-hp (56 kW) four-cylinder Duesenberg engine went for $5,300 (4-passenger) and $5,400 (7-passenger). In 1920, 1,657 Roamers were produced. By 1922, only Roamer's Model 6-54 remained.

In 1924 a reorganization resulted in the formation of Roamer Motor Car Company, incorporated at Toronto, Ontario and headed by George P. Wigginton. Plans were to move Roamer manufacturing to Ontario. A. C. Barley became a director of the new company, but kept the Kalamazoo factory and the Barley Motor Car Company. Production of the Roamer ended up remaining in Kalamazoo.

In 1925, Roamer abandoned the Continental in favor of a Lycoming eight of 88-hp (66 kW), at the same price as the former 6-cylinder engine. The new model was called Model 8-88 and offered in seven body styles. Sales were disappointing. In 1926, the Rochester-Duesenberg was in distress and the Lycoming engine was no longer available to Roamer. A. C. Barley was now President of Roamer Motor Car Company and in December 1926, Roamer bought Rutenber Motor Company and its Logansport, Indiana plant. A. C. Barley had been an officer years earlier. The Barley family had been large shareholders in the company.

"Assembled cars" in the luxury market were declining in sales, and the company stopped manufacturing in early 1929.

=== Barley Motor Car ===
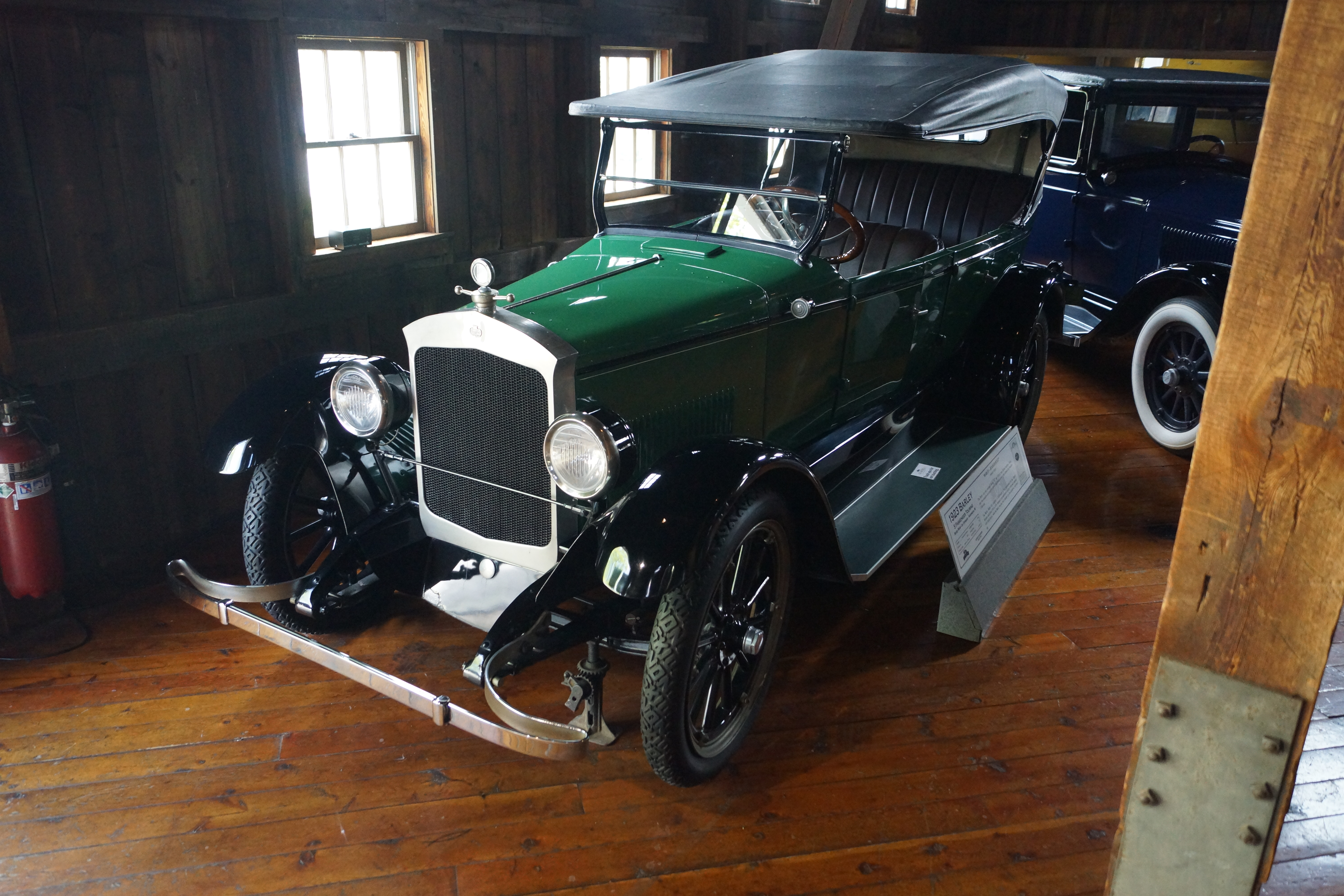
1923 Barley 6-50 Touring at the Gilmore Car Museum

In 1922 the company introduced a lower-priced line, the Barley, named for the company's president. The first Barley Model 6-50 debuted in September offering torpedoes and sedans with Continental 50hp six-cylinder engines and a 118" wheelbase. The following year, a Sport Sedan and Touring Sedan were added. The prices ranged from $1,395 to $2,250, equivalent to $43,278 in 2025.

The Barley was not successful and it was rebranded as the Pennant, outfitted with a Buda 4-cylinder engine and targeted at the taxicab market. Its main competitor was the Checker, also built in Kalamazoo. The Pennant trade-dress was a maroon upper body and ivory lower body. Both the Barley and Pennant were out of production by 1925.

== Model Images ==
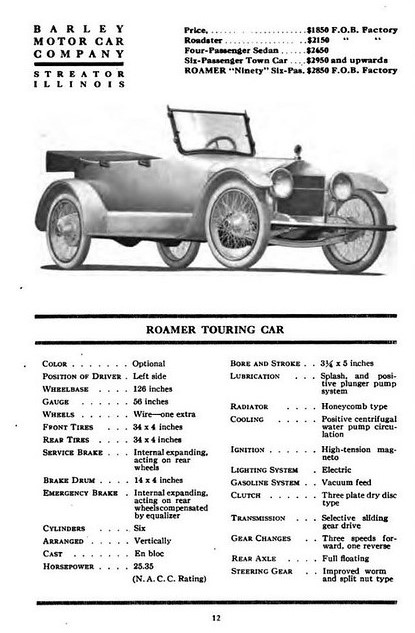
1917 Roamer Touring Car

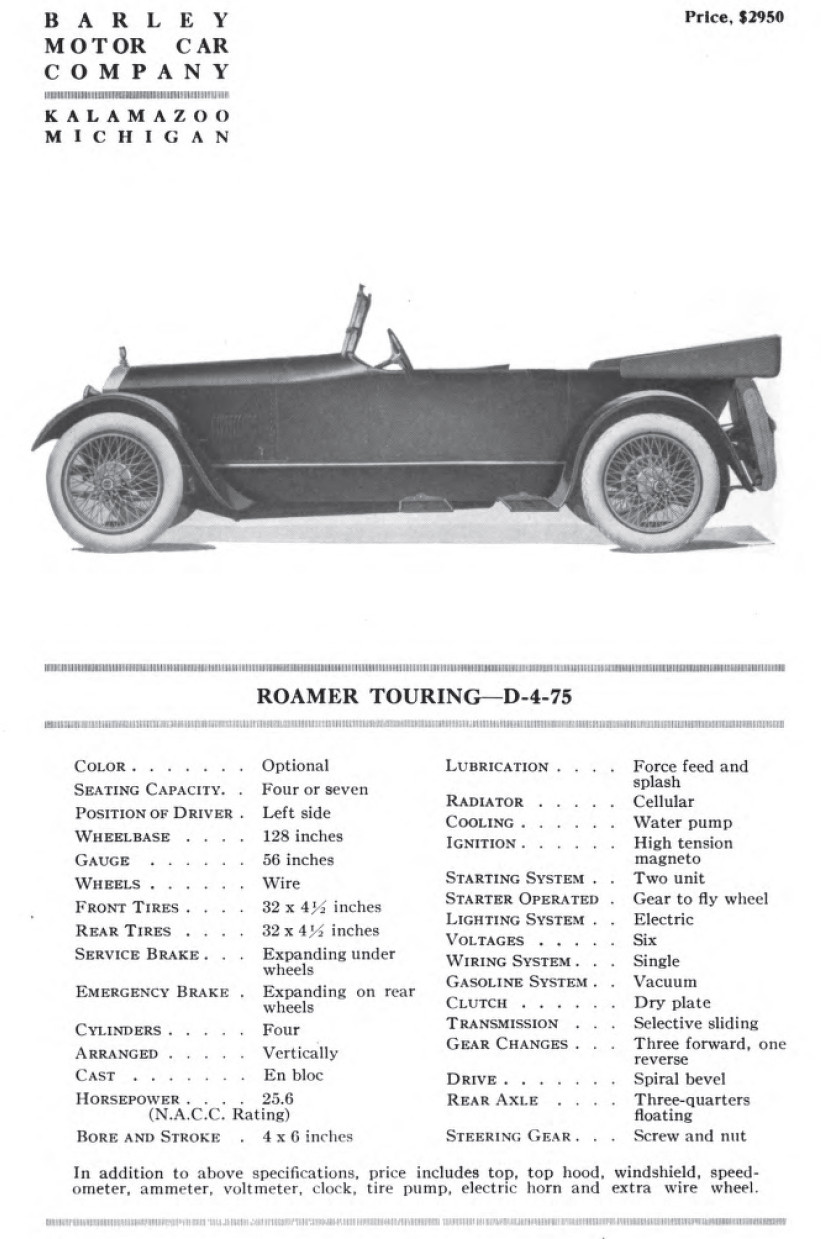
1918 Roamer Touring D-4-75

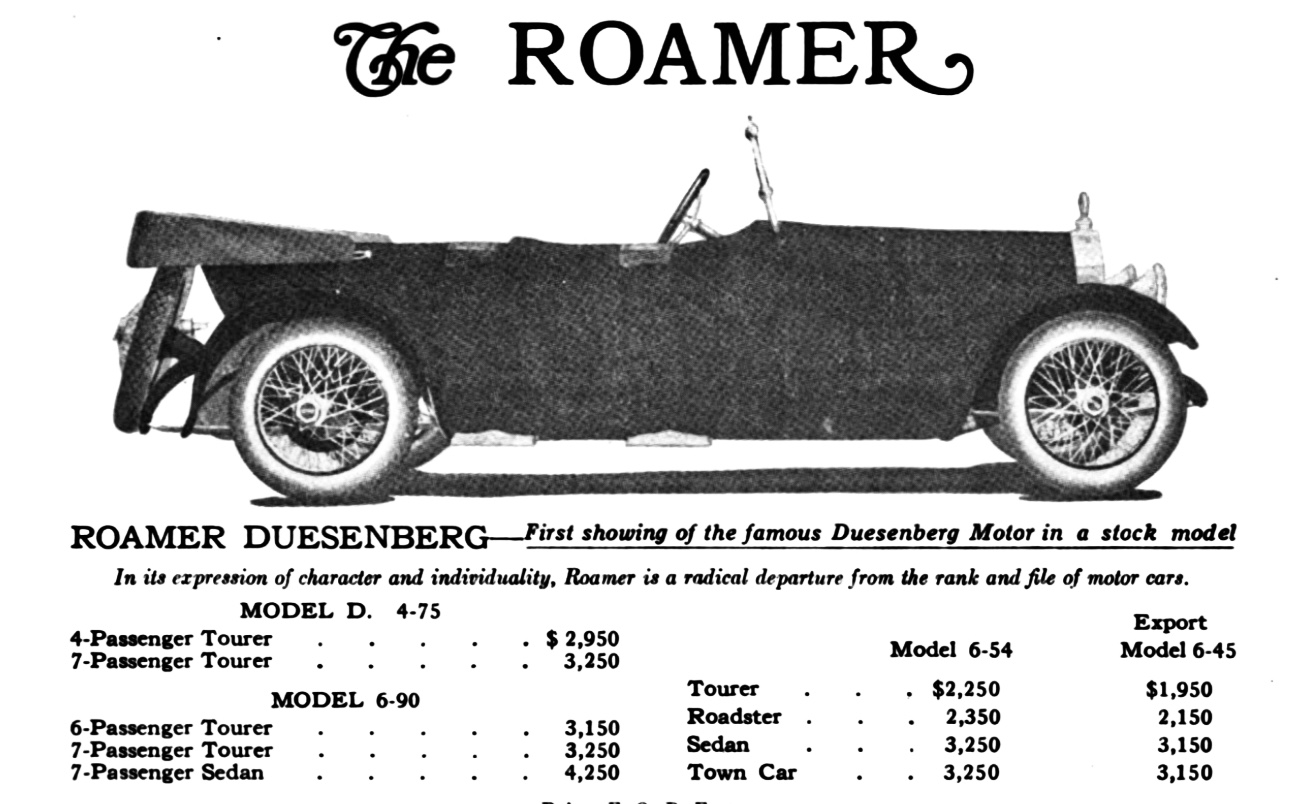
Roamer (1918)

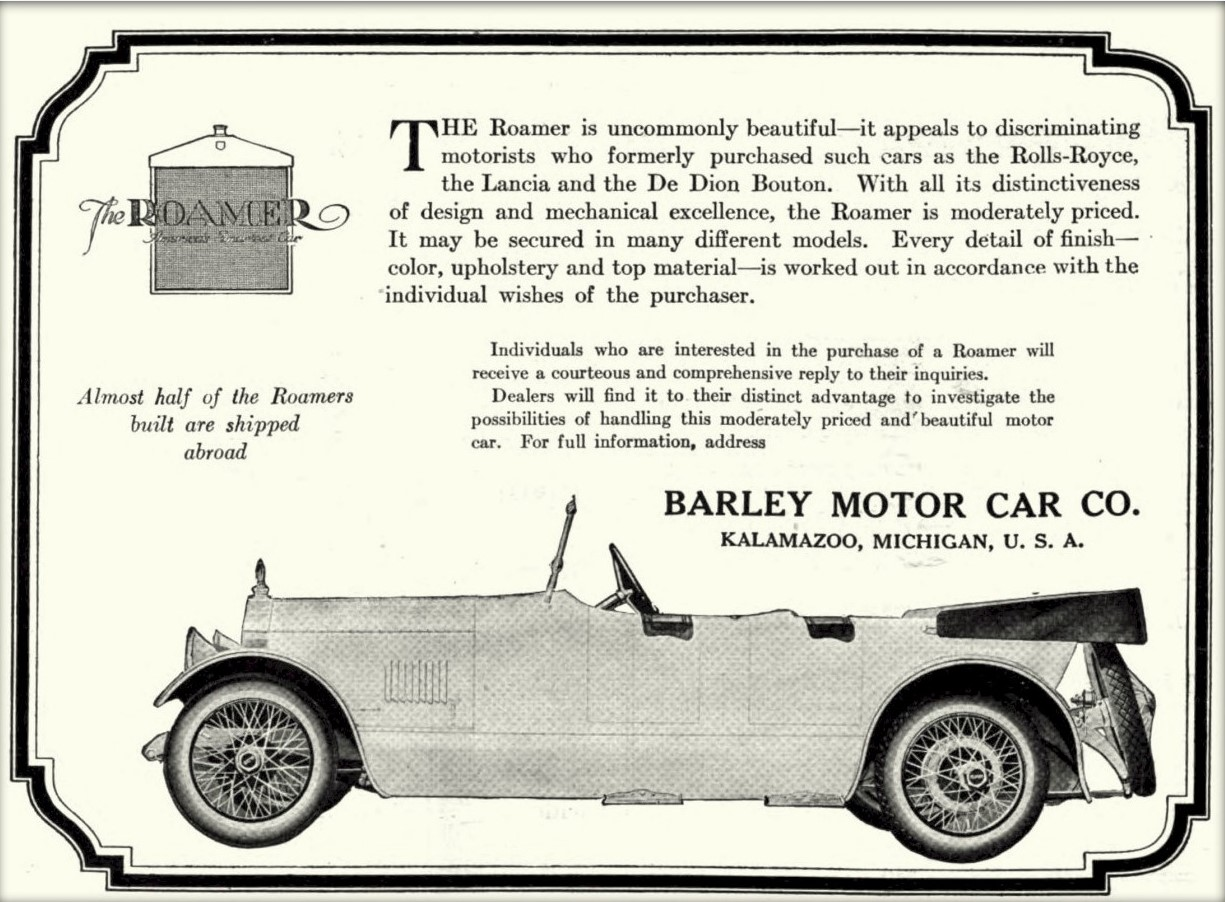
1919 Roamer Touring Car and Export market advertisement

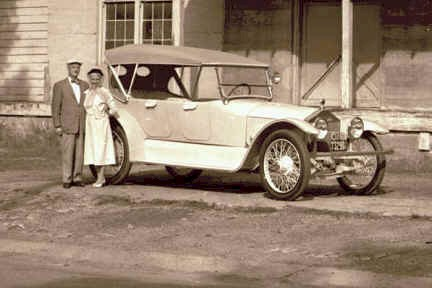
1919 Roamer Touring Car

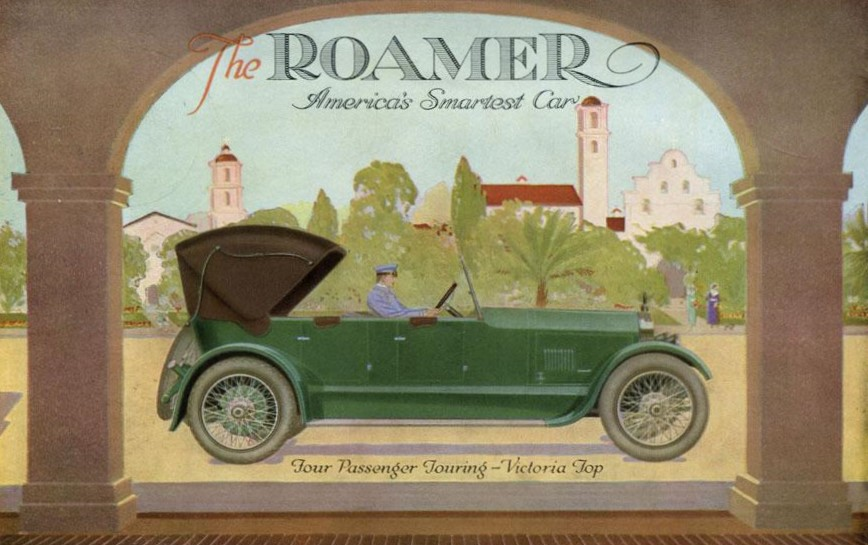
1920 Roamer Touring with Victoria Top

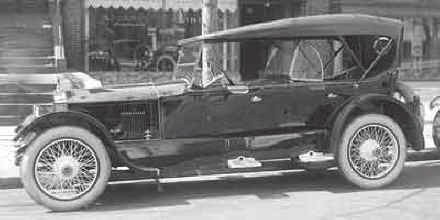
1920 Roamer Sport - dual cowl

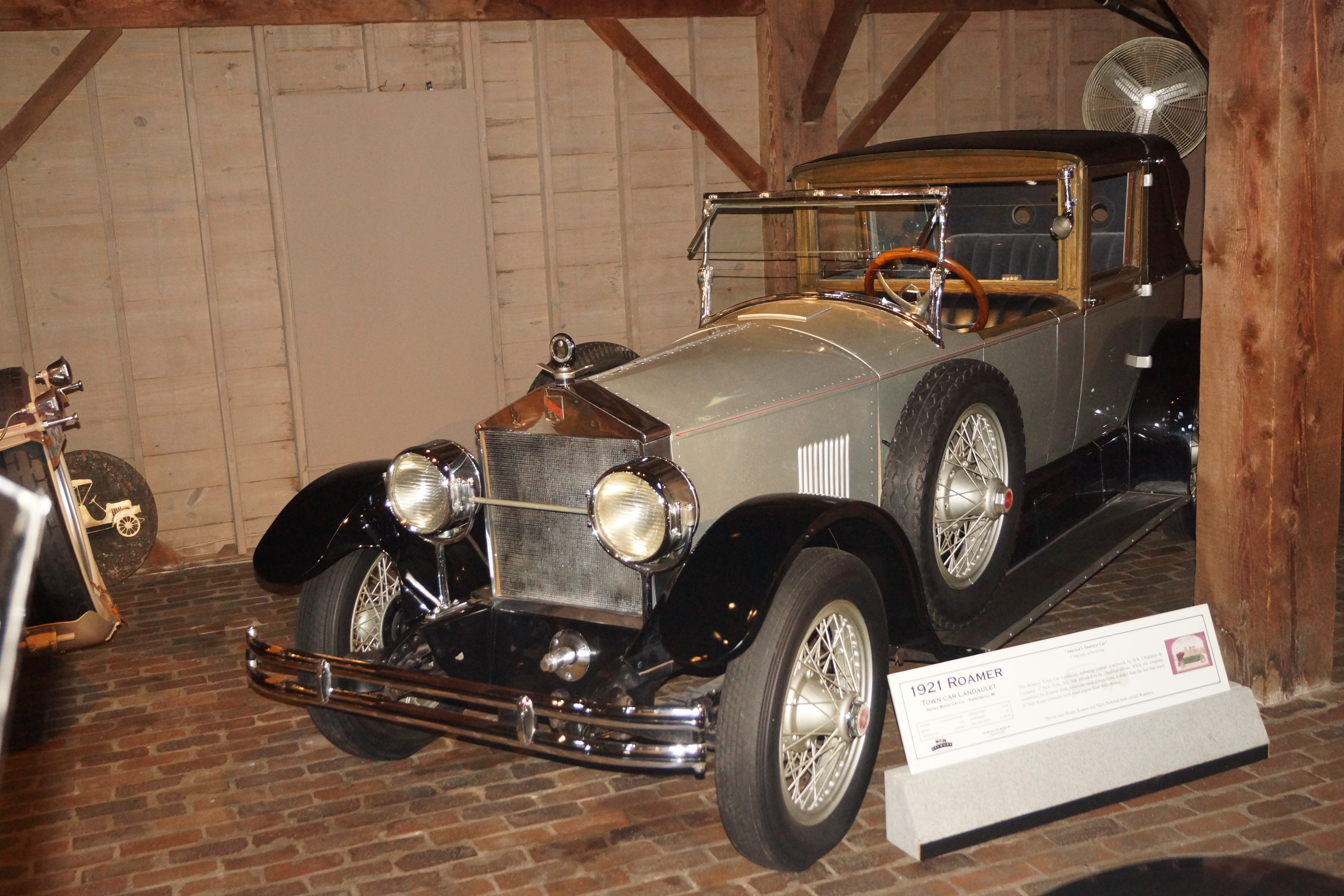
1921 Roamer Model 6-54-E Town Landaulet

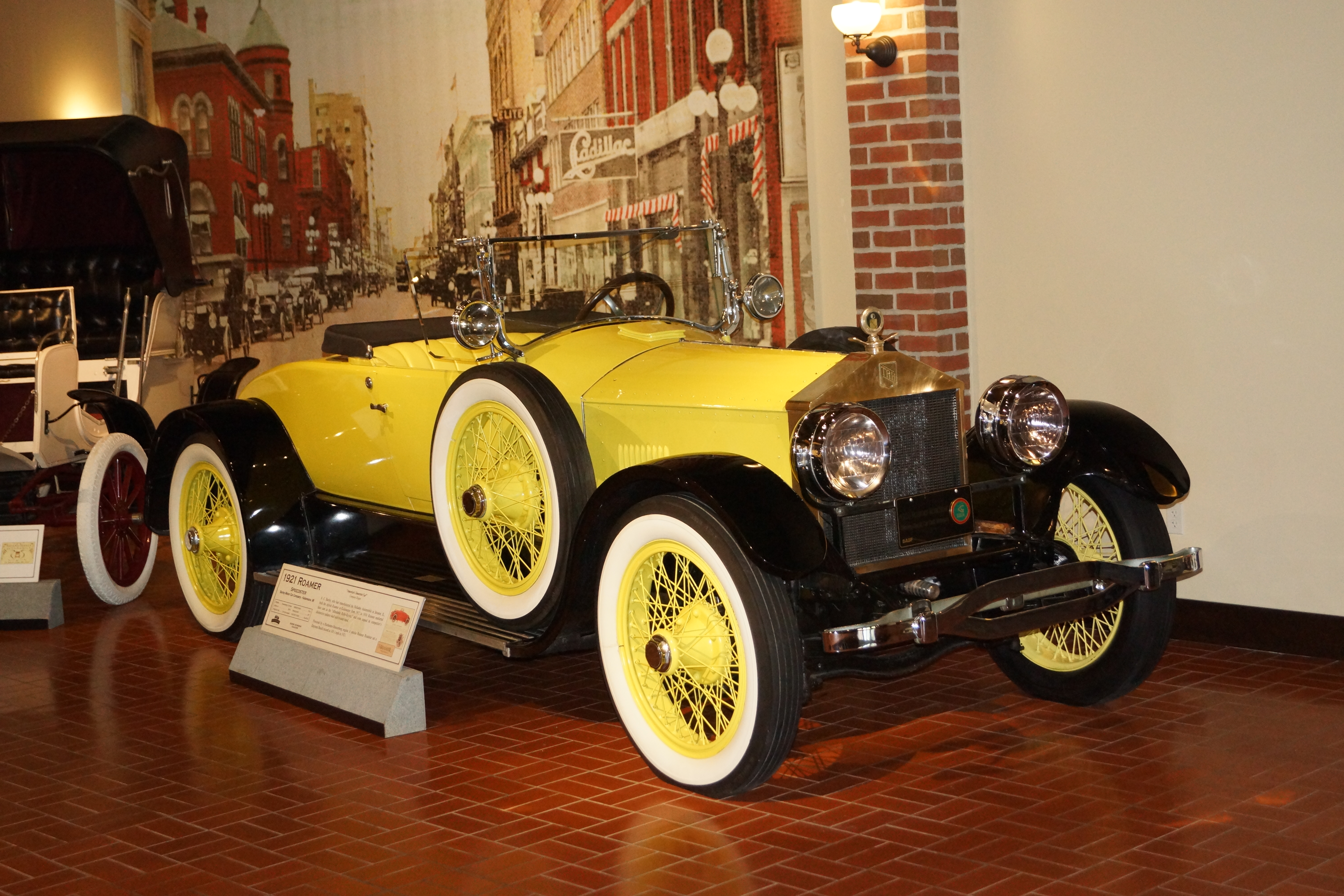
1922 Roamer Model D-4-75

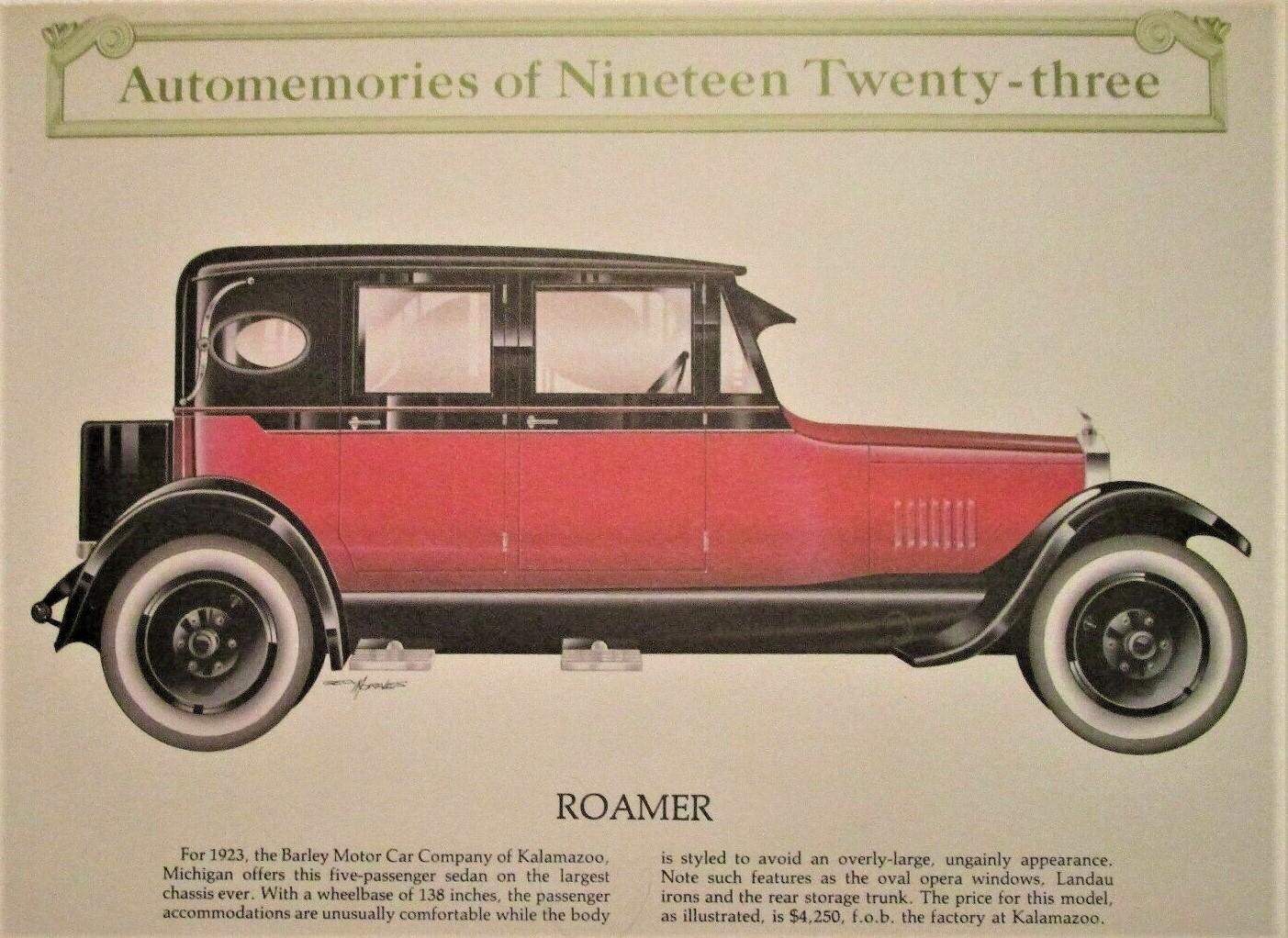
1923 Roamer 5-passenger sedan brochure

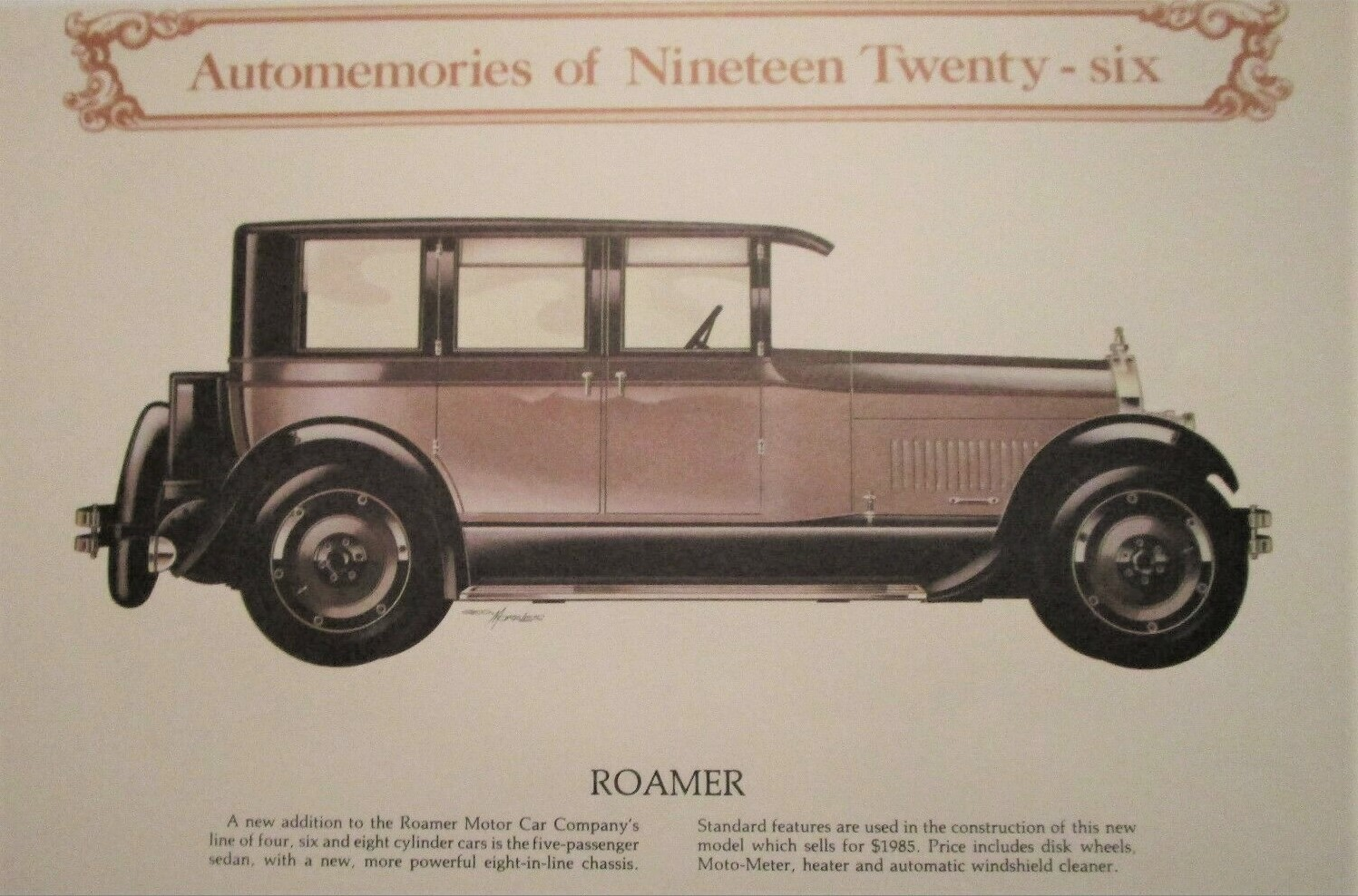
1926 Roamer 5-passenger sedan eight-in-line chassis brochure

== Advertisements ==
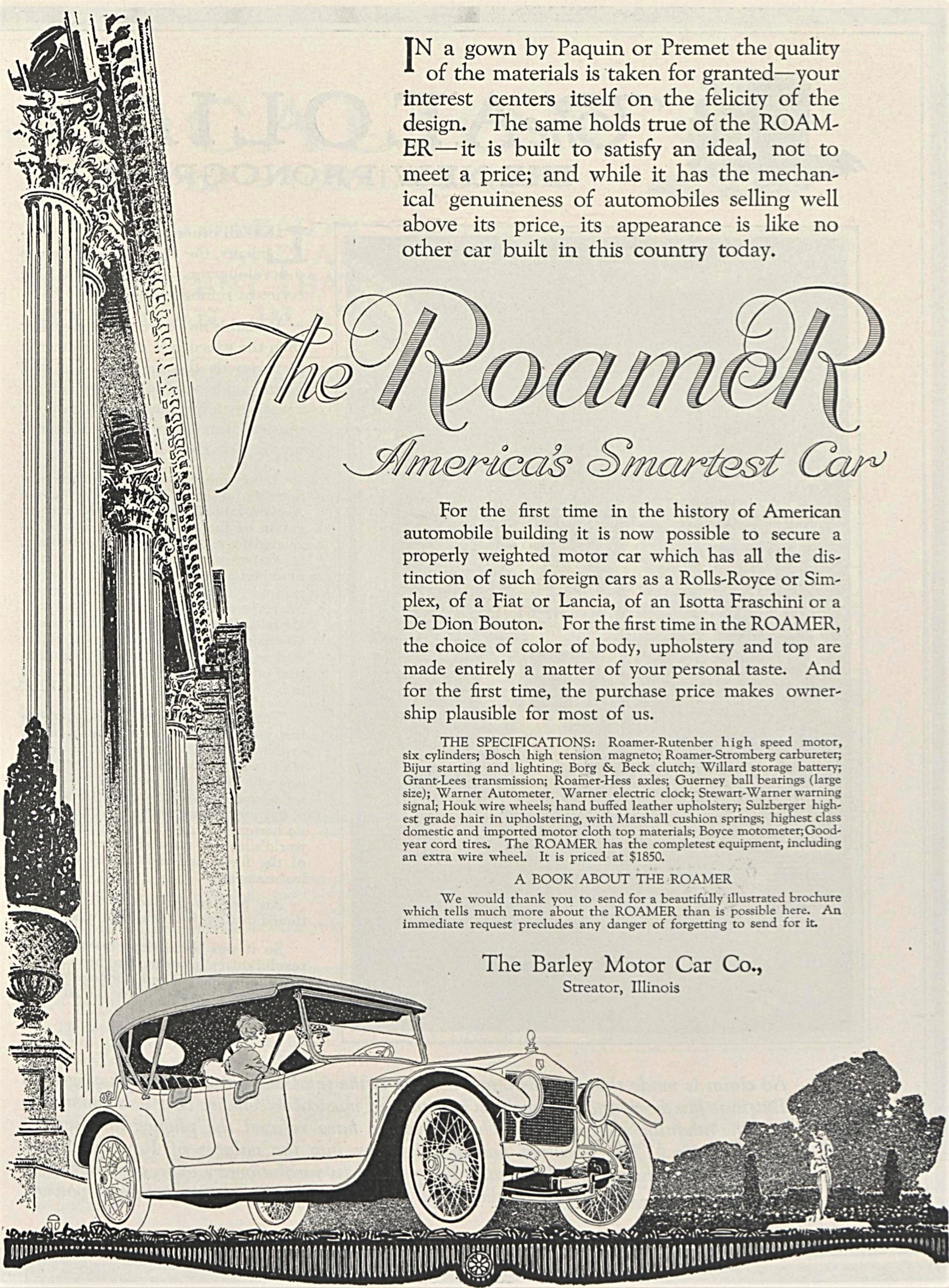
1916 Roamer advertisement 'America's Smartest Car'

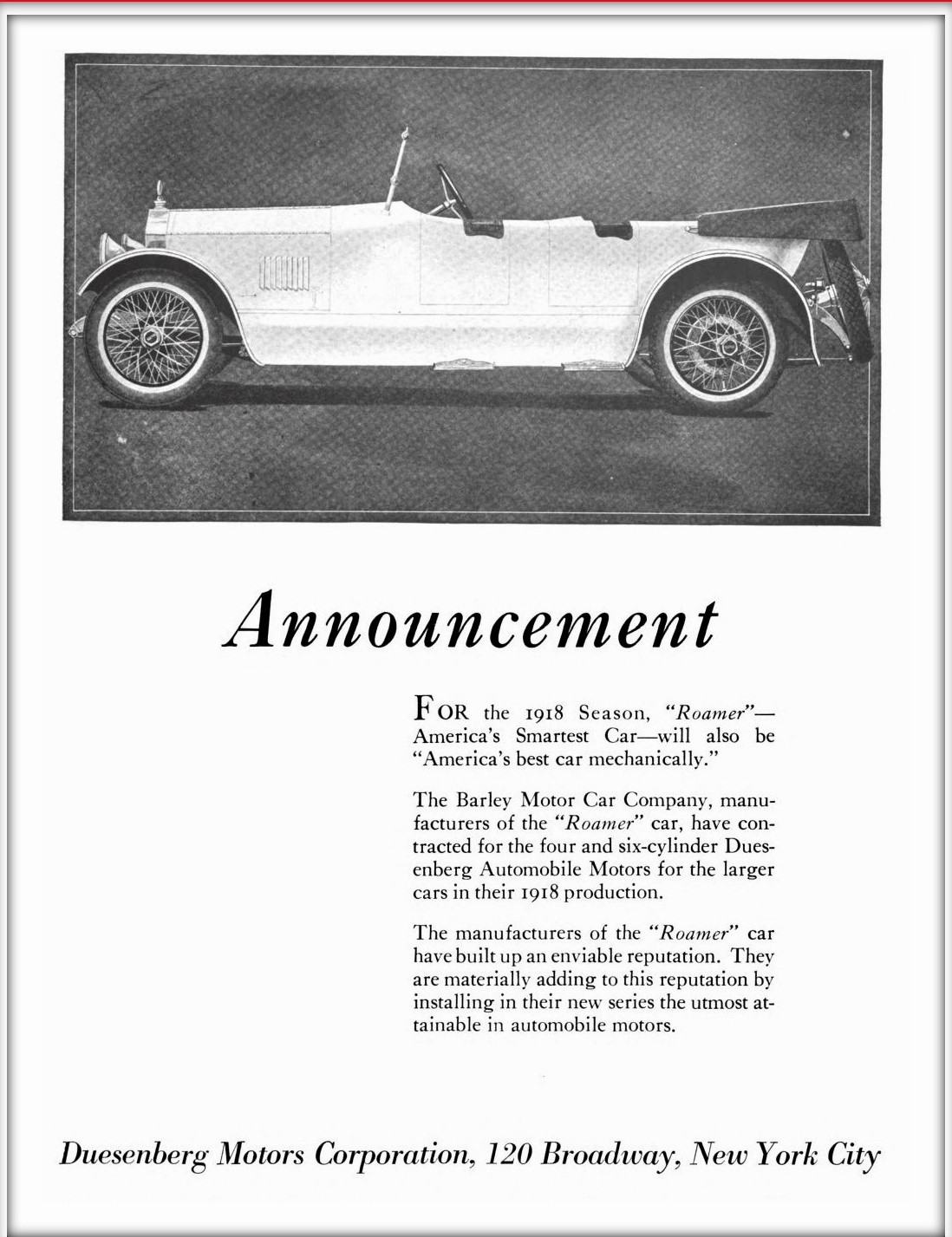
1918 Roamer Duesenberg advertisement

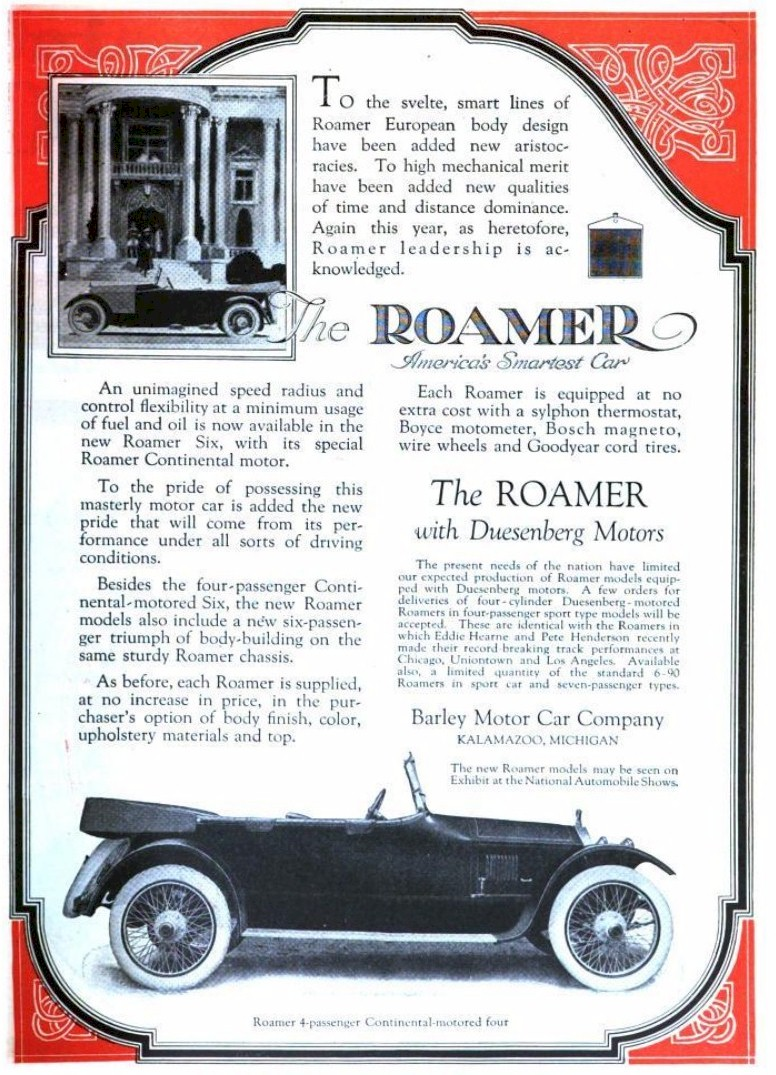
1918 The Roamer with Duesenberg Motors advertisement

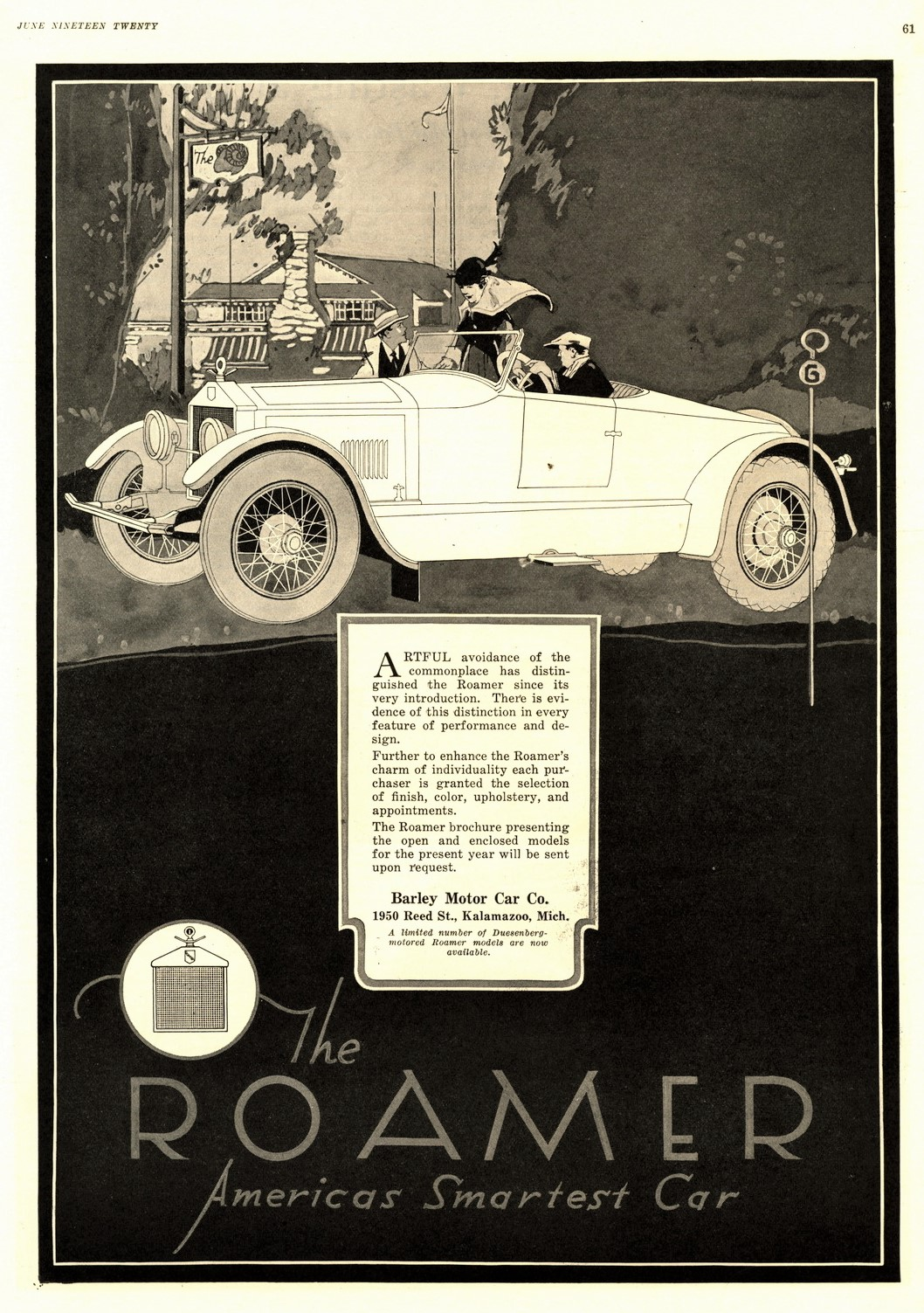
1920 Roamer advertisement

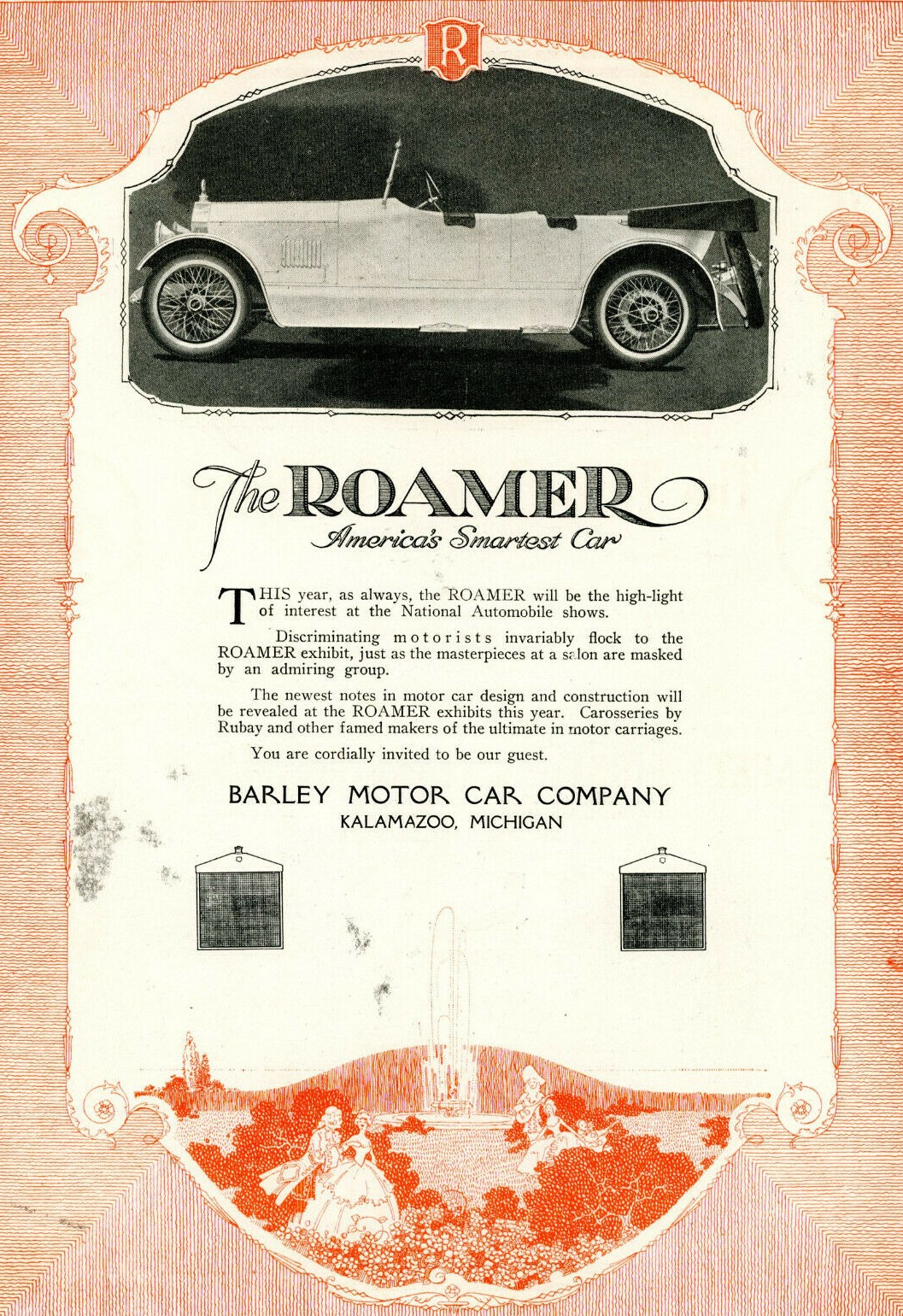
1920 Roamer advertisement

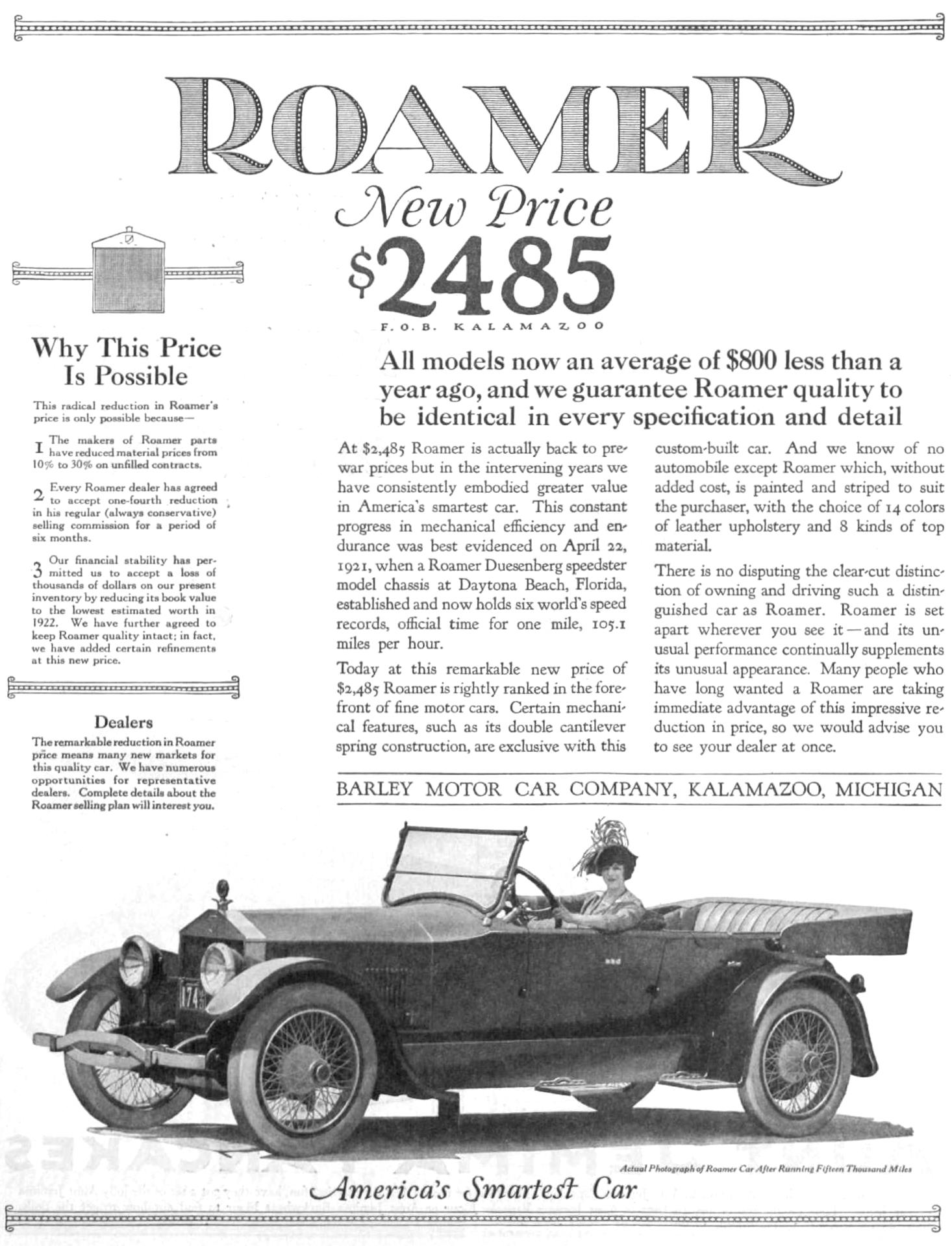
1921 Roamer price cut advertisement

== See also ==
- Roamer automobiles at ConceptCarz
- Karl H. Martin at Coachbuilt.com
- Barley Motor Car at SecondChanceGarage
- Roamer Motor Car at SecondChance Garage
