= States (automobile) =

Defunct American motor vehicle manufacturer

The States was a cyclecar manufactured by the States Cyclecar Company of Detroit, Michigan in 1915.

The States Motor Car Company manufactured the Greyhound cyclecar built first in Toledo, Ohio and then in Kalamazoo, Michigan from 1913 to 1915. From 1916 the successor States Motor Manufacturing Company built the Greyhound, and then the States automobile in Kalamazoo from 1917-1919.

== States Cyclecar Company ==
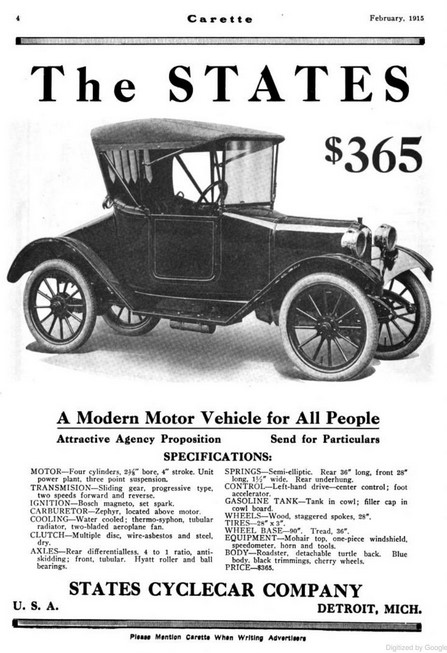
1915 States cyclecar advertisement in Carette magazine

The States Cyclecar Company was organized in Detroit in July 1914 with a $150,000 capitalization by major stockholders George W. Meredith, Samuel E. Jones and Victor W. Valade. The States was a four-cylinder, two-passenger side-by-side roadster body and came fully equipped including a mohair top for $365, equivalent to $11,616 in 2025. The States was introduced at the Detroit Automobile Show in January 1915, and closed later that year.

== States Motor Car Company ==
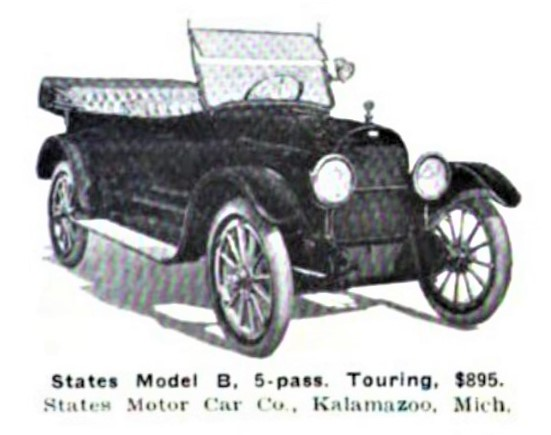
1918 States Model B Touring Car - Cycle and Automobile Trade Journal

The States Motor Car Manufacturing Company and the previous States Motor Car Company which had built the Greyhound cyclecar and light cars in the old Michigan Buggy Company plant in Kalamazoo was combined in 1917 into a new States Motor Car Company, capitalized at $6,000,000. The people involved were John A. Pyl as president, James H. Johnson and B. R. Barber as vice-presidents.

The new States car was a four-cylinder slightly larger than the Greyhound, priced at $895, equivalent to $19,157 in 2025. E. J. Cook designed the car. A six-cylinder companion car was added for 1918, but that was the final year for the States. The company was reported to be "permanently out of business” in the January 23rd, 1919 issue of Motor Age.
