= Martin Wasp =

Defunct motor vehicle manufacturers of the United States

Wasp (Martin-Wasp)
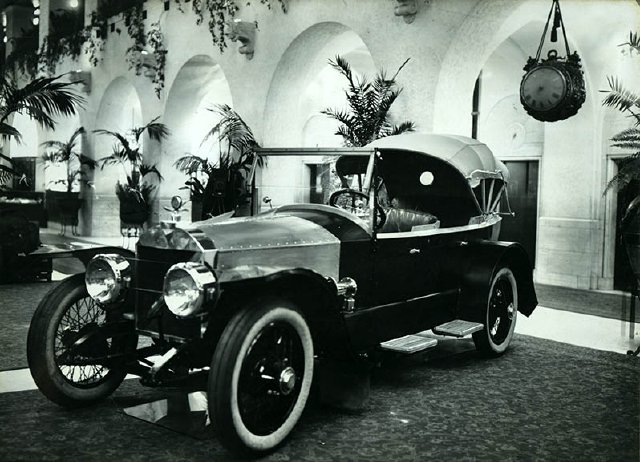
- Martin- Wasp display at the Hotel Commodore - 1920

Overview
- Type: Touring
- Manufacturer: Martin Wasp Corporation
- Production: 1919–1925
- Assembly: Bennington, Vermont, United States
- Designer: Karl Hamlen Martin

Body and chassis
- Class: Luxury car
- Body style: Rickshaw Phaeton
- Chassis: Parish & Bingham chassis on Timkin axles

Powertrain
- Engine: Wisconsin, T-head 350 cu in (5.8-liter) 4-cylinder
- Power output: 72-hp
- Transmission: Brown-Lipe 4-speed

Dimensions
- Wheelbase: 3,454 mm (136.0 in)
- Curb weight: 3800 lbs

The Martin-Wasp or Wasp is a luxury American automobile which was built by the Martin-Wasp Corporation in Bennington, Vermont, from 1919 to 1925.

== History ==
Karl Hamlen Martin designed bespoke coachwork automobile bodies, as well as creating designs for Kenworthy, Barley, Roamer, Owen-Magnetic, Dorris and other automobile manufacturers. From 1916 to 1918 he was an independent body designer for imported chassis of Renault, Rolls-Royce, Mors, Mercedes, and others. Martin also designed and cast a St. Christopher medal in bronze that was successfully marketed for automobiles between 1917 and 1920.

In 1919 Martin leased workshops at a Pleasant street plant in Bennington, Vermont and incorporated the Martin-Wasp Corporation to build coach-built automobiles. The cars were custom built in tranches of 6 at a time, and would be considered an "assembled car" using high-end automotive parts from major manufacturers.

The Wasp coachwork was Karl Martin's touring car design that he called a Rickshaw Phaeton. It was described as having sharply pointed stylized fenders, fully-nickeled German radiator and headlights, large step plates, natural wood bows on top with many curves, bullet lights in the windshield, and black lacquer paint contrasting with its natural aluminum hood. Rudge-Whitworth wire wheels, stylized aluminum stingers on the hood, red leather interior with in-laid wood dash with a built-in St. Christopher's medal, completed the description.

The first Wasp was done just in time for National Automobile Week in New York City and was exhibited at the Commodore Hotel in January, 1920. The brochure offered was titled Automobiles Wasp. The display car was purchased by Douglas Fairbanks Sr.

The Wasp had a 4-cylinder Wisconsin engine on a 136-inch wheelbase. The price with coachwork was $5,500, equivalent to $88,393 in 2025. In 1922 Martin announced his next series which would be a six-cylinder Continental engine custom car, with a 144-inch wheelbase priced at $10,000, (equivalent to $192,346 in 2025).

The company built 17 Wasps between 1919 and 1925, 14 four-cylinder and 3 six-cylinder on the longer chassis. In 1947 an additional car was assembled from a factory 1921 4-cylinder chassis using Karl Martin's coachwork. Martin-Wasp Corporation is considered to be Vermont's only early serial automobile manufacturer.

Three Wasps survive, one of which is on display at the Bennington Museum in Bennington, Vermont.

== Gallery ==
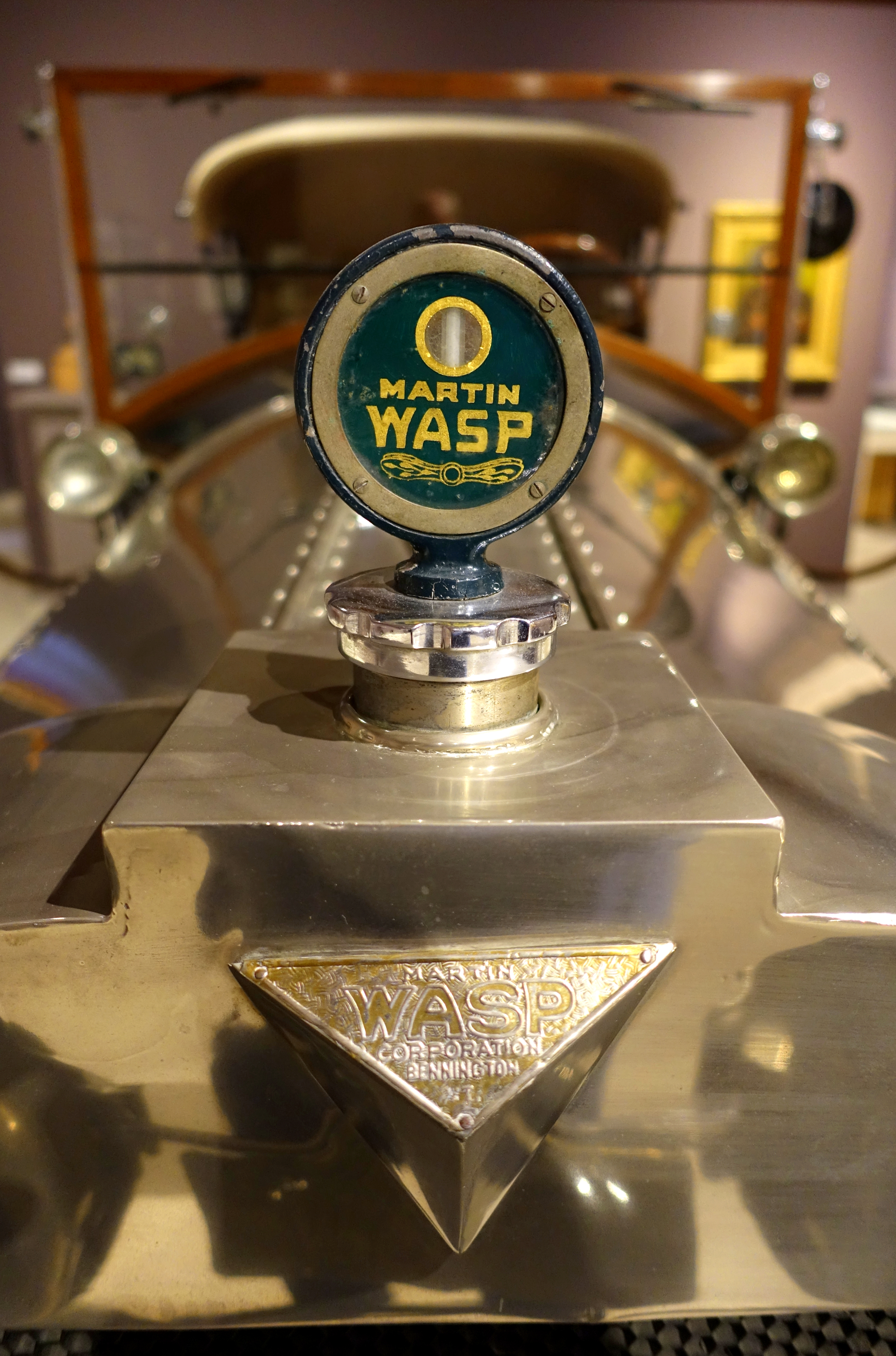
Martin-Wasp Radiator Emblem - Bennington Museum - Bennington, VT

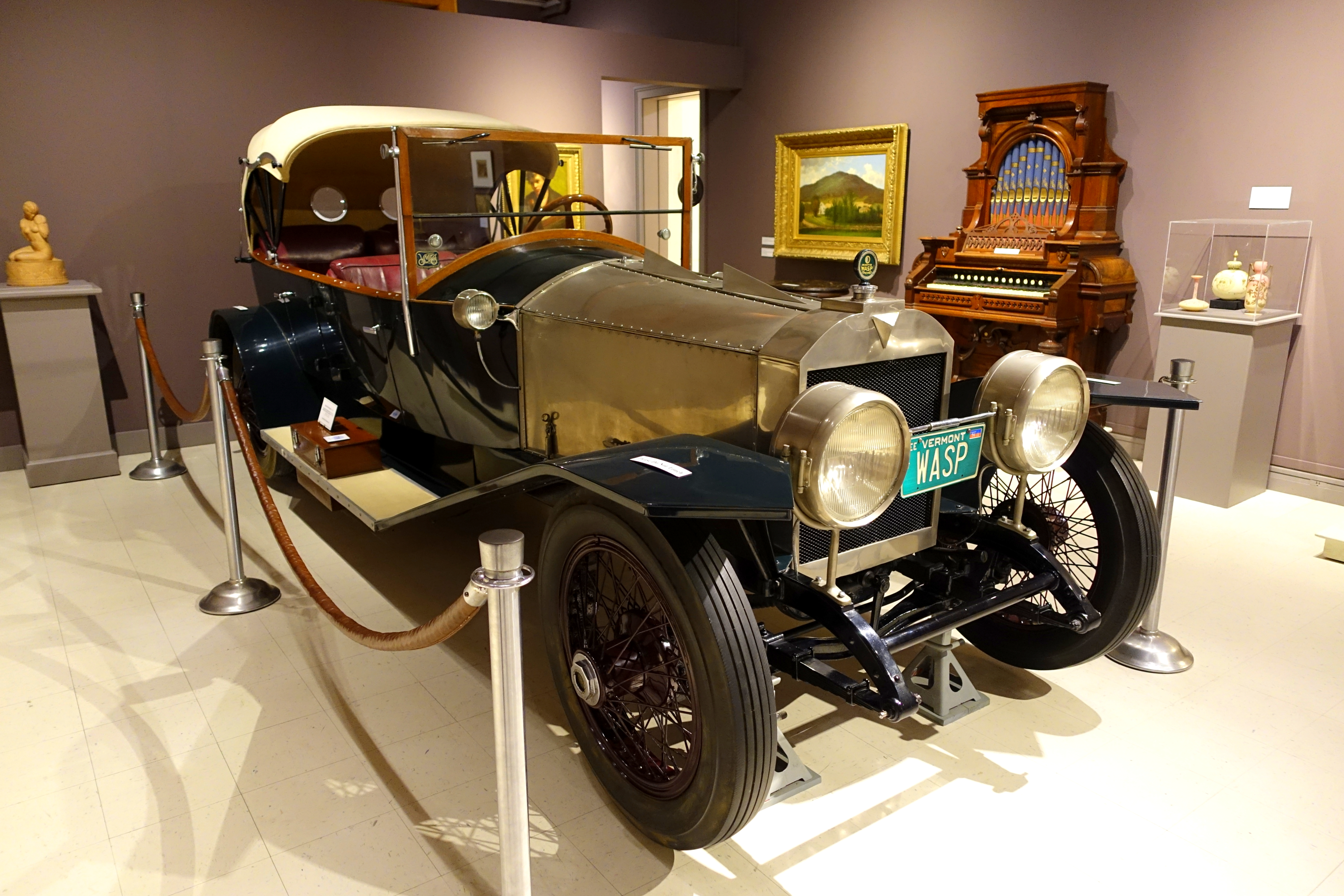
1924 Martin-Wasp - Bennington Museum - Bennington, VT

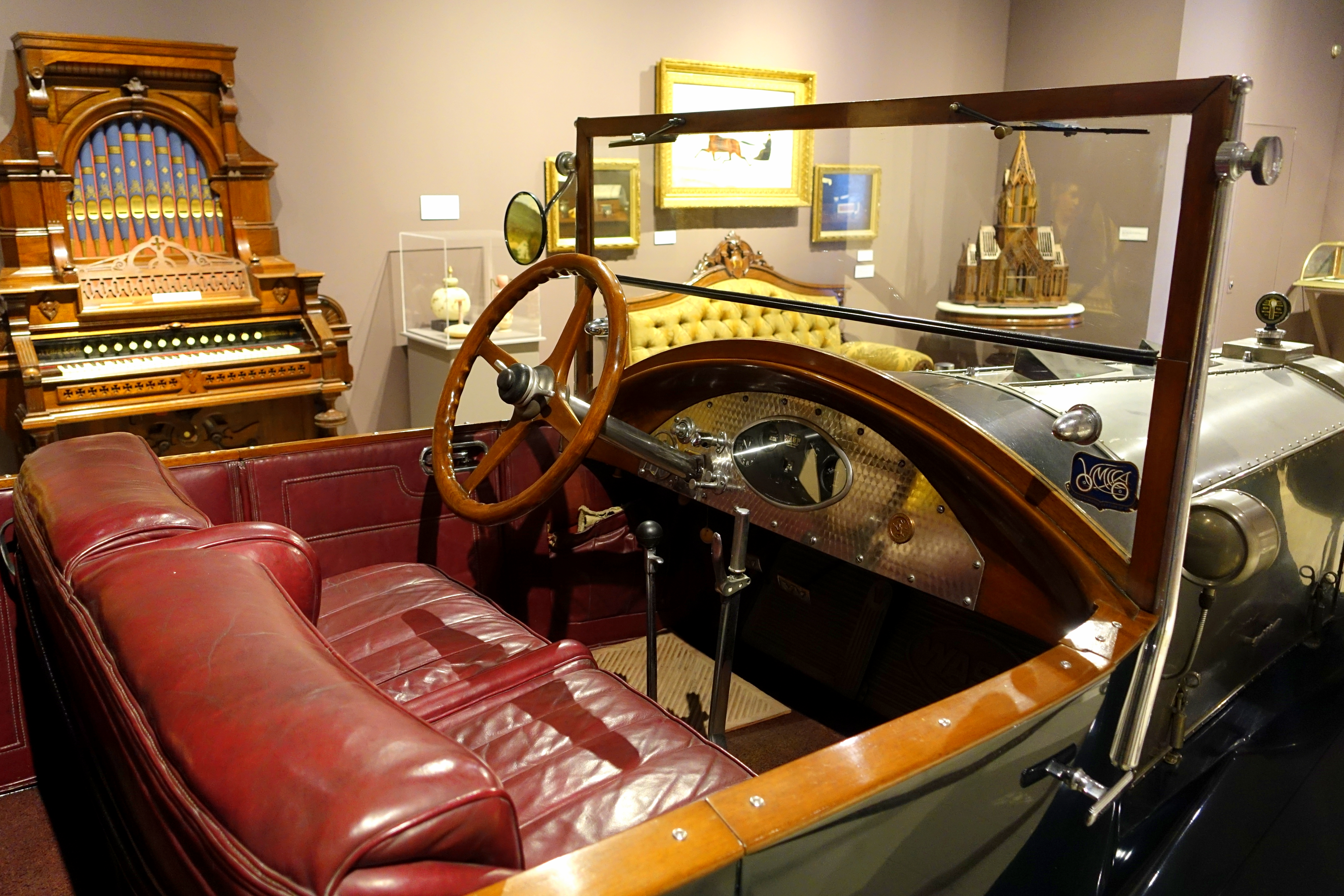
1924 Martin-Wasp - Bennington Museum - Bennington, VT

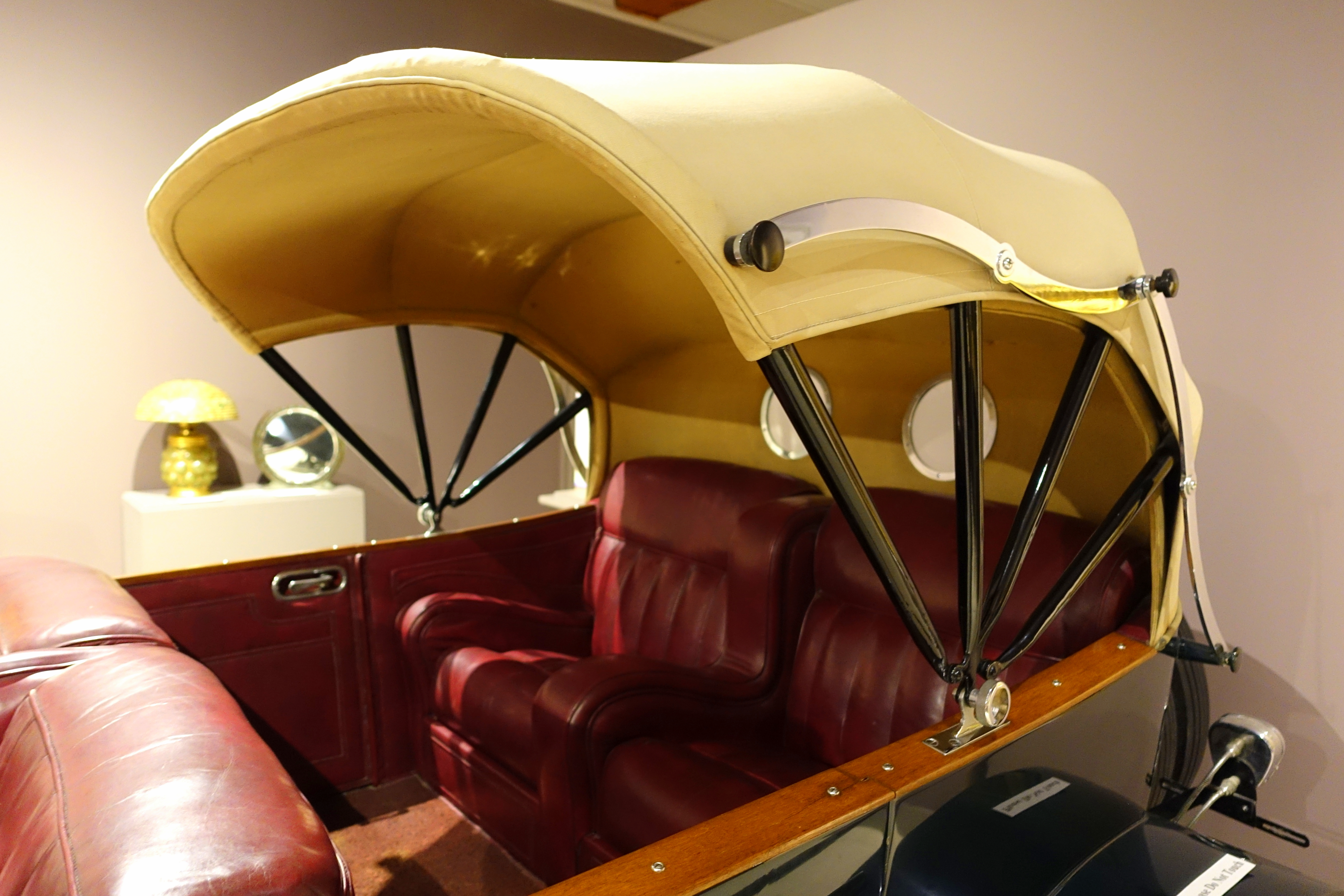
1924 Martin-Wasp - Rickshaw Phaeton Body - Bennington Museum - Bennington, VT
