= Michigan (1908 automobile) =

Defunct American motor vehicle manufacturer

Michigan Buggy Company Michigan Motor Car Company
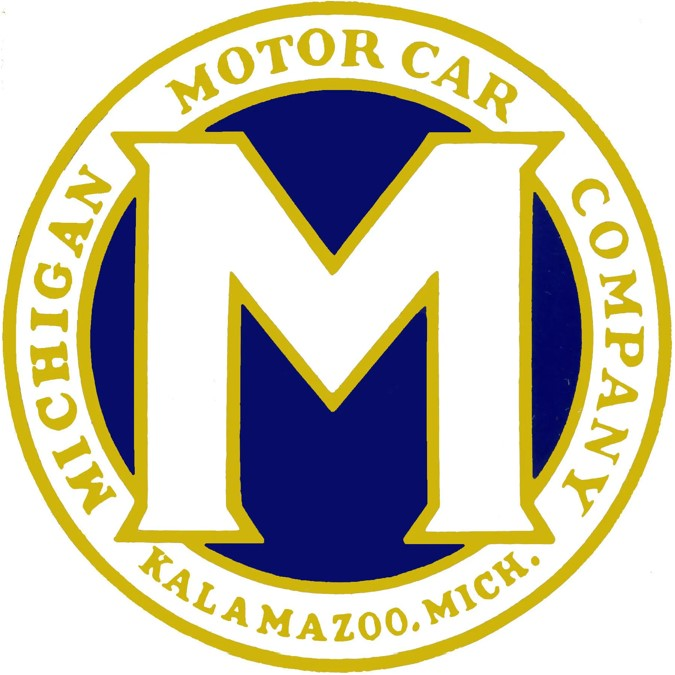
- Mighty Michigan
- Type: Automobile manufacturer
- Founded: 1883; 143 years ago, 1911; 115 years ago
- Founder: M. Henry Lane, Frank B. Lay
- Defunct: 1914; 112 years ago
- Fate: Bankrupt
- Headquarters: Kalamazoo, Michigan, United States
- Key people: Frank B. Lay Jr., George T. Lay, Victor L. Palmer
- Products: Automobiles

The Michigan was a brass era automobile manufactured in Kalamazoo, Michigan from 1904 to 1913 by the Michigan Buggy Company and its subsidiary the Michigan Motor Car Company.

== History ==
The Michigan Buggy Company founded in 1883 By M. Henry Lane and Frank B. Lay was a major producer of buggies, carriages and wagons. In 1904 it motorized one of its buggies and offered the high-wheeler for $450. The car was powered by a single-cylinder]] 3 1/2 horsepower engine, the wheelbase was 54-inches, the tread 36-inches and it had a two-speed transmission which had no reverse. This motor buggy was offered on a limited basis, occasionally under the name of Kalamazoo, but more often as the Michigan.

=== Michigan Motor Car Company ===
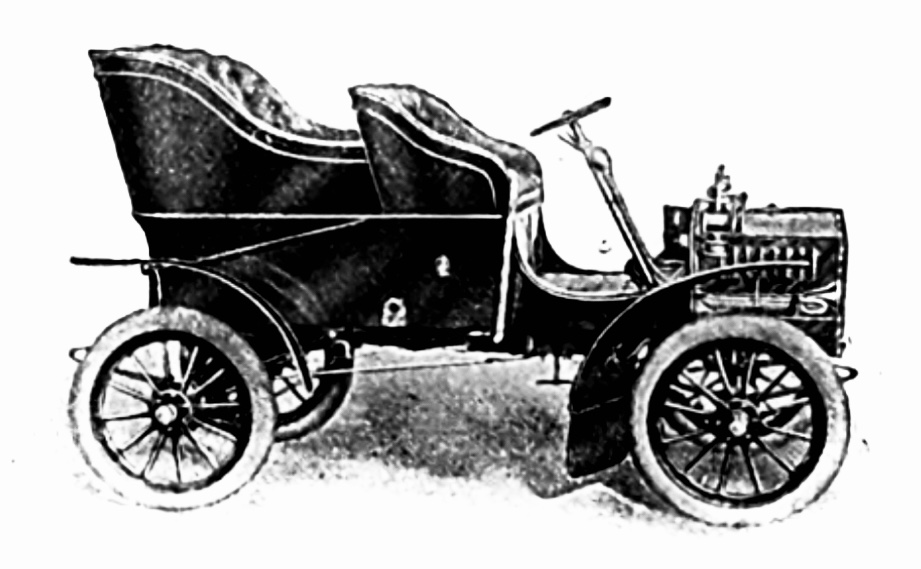
Michigan Motor Car Model D (1905)

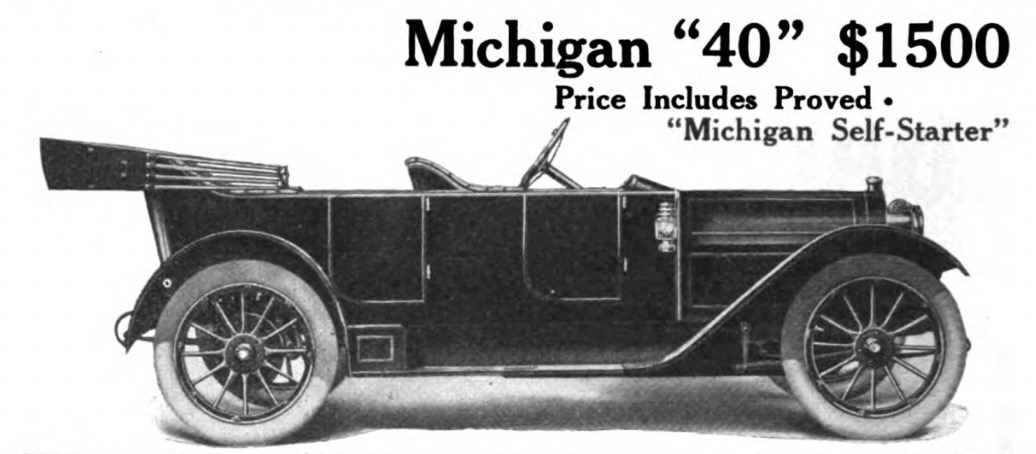
Michigan Model 40-K (1912-1914)

Serious production of an automobile did not begin until 1911 with the formation of the Michigan Motor Car Company. Involved in this venture were company officials Victor L. Palmer, Frank B. Lay, Jr. and George T. Lay.

W. H. Cameron, who had been an engineer for both Willys-Overland and Flanders designed the new car. A coachwork designer, John A. Campbell, styled the body. The first car Model B was assembled from outside parts including the 40 horsepower engines from Buda Engine Co. and Falls Engine Co. The coachwork was done by Michigan Buggy Co. and the car originally was on a 112-inch wheelbase. It had leather upholstery and a 22-coat paint finish of 'golden auto brown' with a price of $1,750.

In 1912 the wheelbase was increased to 116-inches for the Model 40 and a junior Model 33 with a 33-hp engine was offered. Prices were in the mid-range for the Model 40 at $1,500, equivalent to $50,043 in 2025. This model range continued into 1913.

The resulting Michigan 40 was nicknamed the 'Mighty Michigan' and it was aggressively advertised with the slogan of "A Mechanically Right and Right Priced Car Supreme in the Forty Field". The $1,500 price was considered very low for a 40-hp automobile.

=== Fate ===
The Michigan's problem was in management. Under pricing of their car caused huge debts, but other issues resulted. Newspapers headlined “one of the worst business deals in Michigan financial history". Though the company had announced that its labor force had risen from 348 in 1909 to 553 in 1913, a lot of these people were on paper only. Four officials of the Michigan firm were said to have earned an extra $100,000 each from what the press called the “velvet payroll". Two officials were convicted of embezzlement. Another was sentenced to a two-year prison term for using the mails to defraud banks.

There was an attempt by Edward F. Gerber, the Michigan distributor in Pittsburgh, to continue manufacture, but this plan fell through. Hugh Chalmers was asked to take time away from his Chalmers to get the company back on its feet, but the scandal doomed the Michigan and his efforts were unavailing. Assets were disposed at a bankruptcy auction. In 1915 the Michigan plant was sold and the States Motor Car Company moved in to build its Greyhound light car there.

== Gallery ==
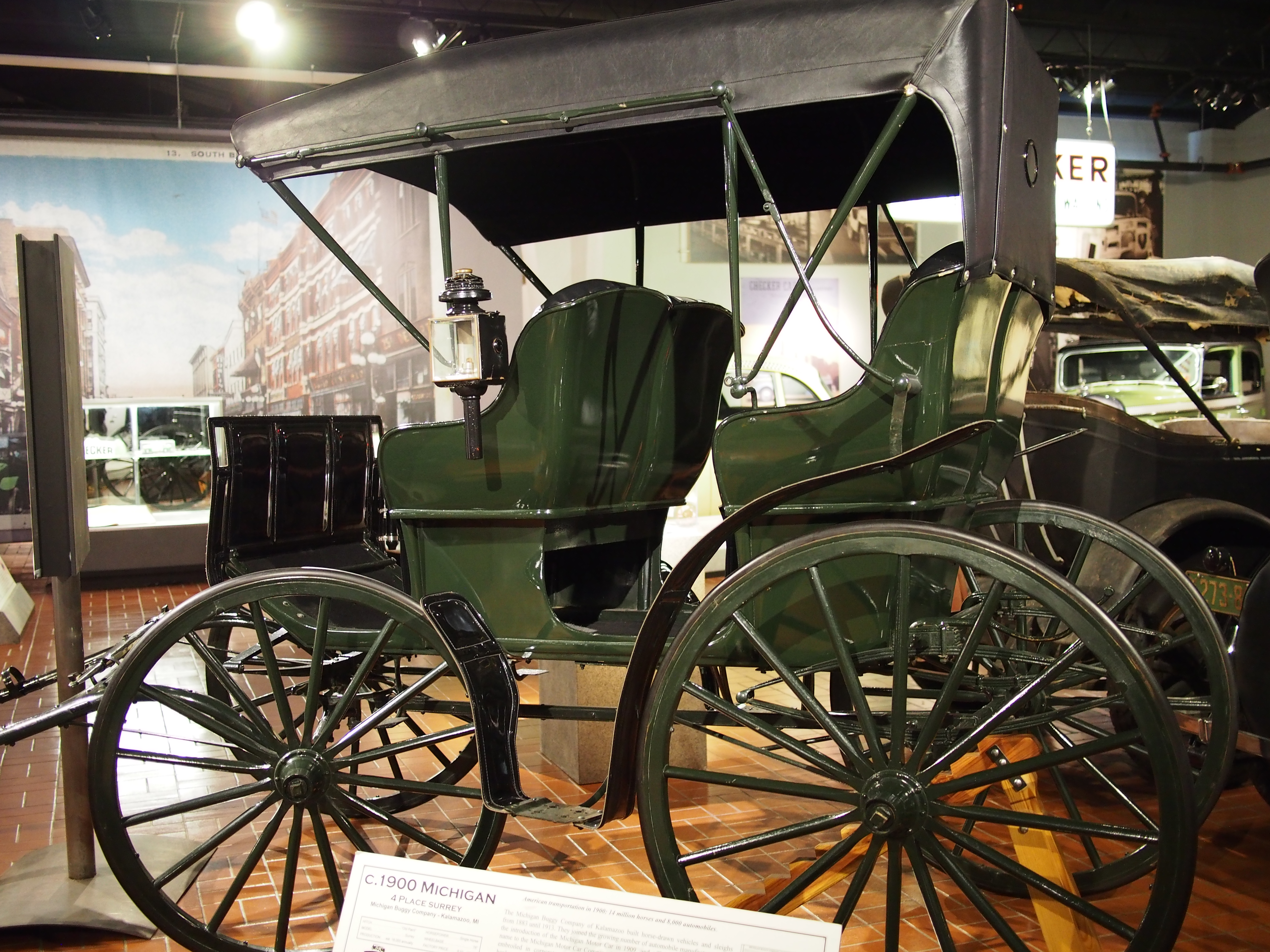
Michigan Buggy Company 4 Place Surrey

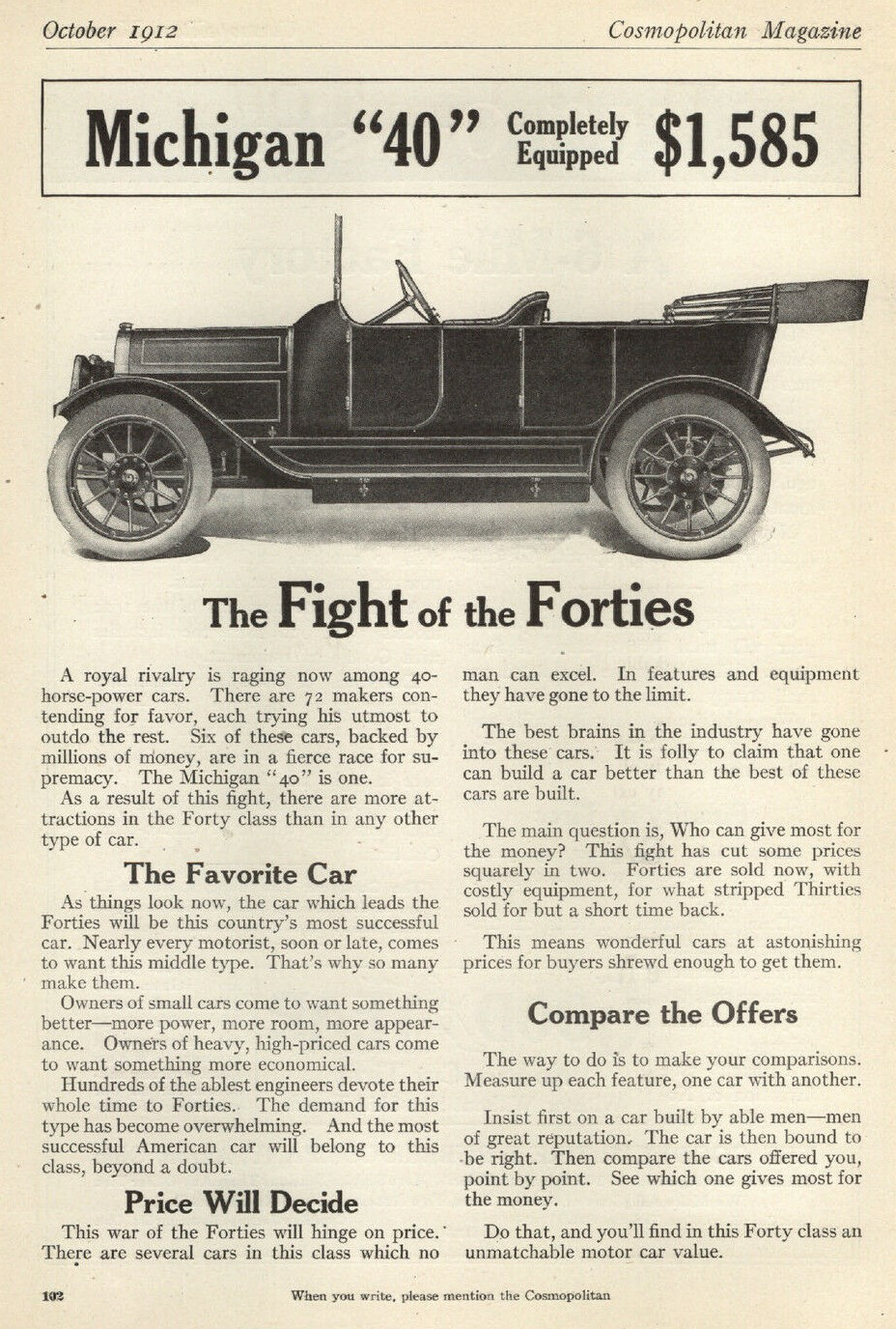
1912 Michigan 40 advertising

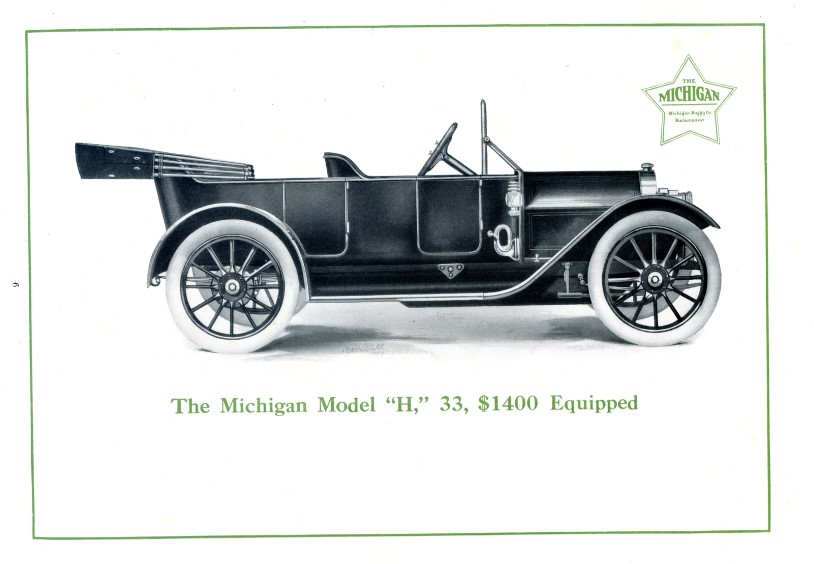
Michigan Model 33 H - 1912 brochure

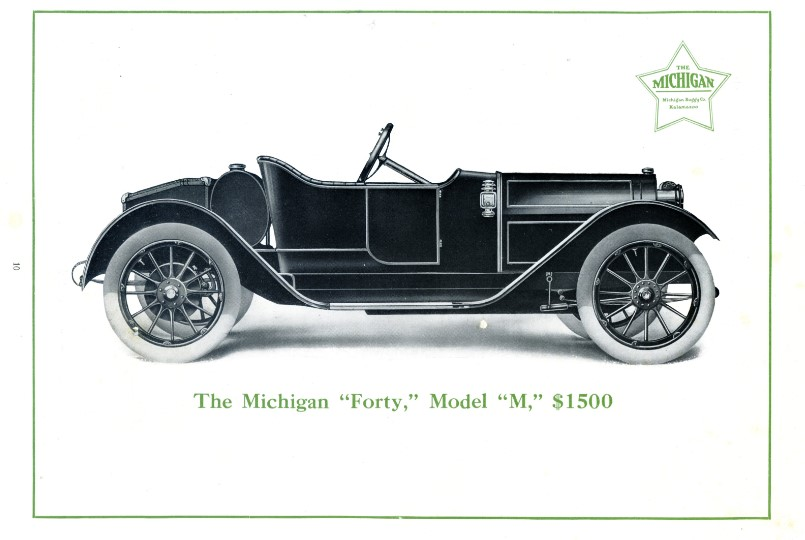
Michigan Model 40 M - 1912 brochure

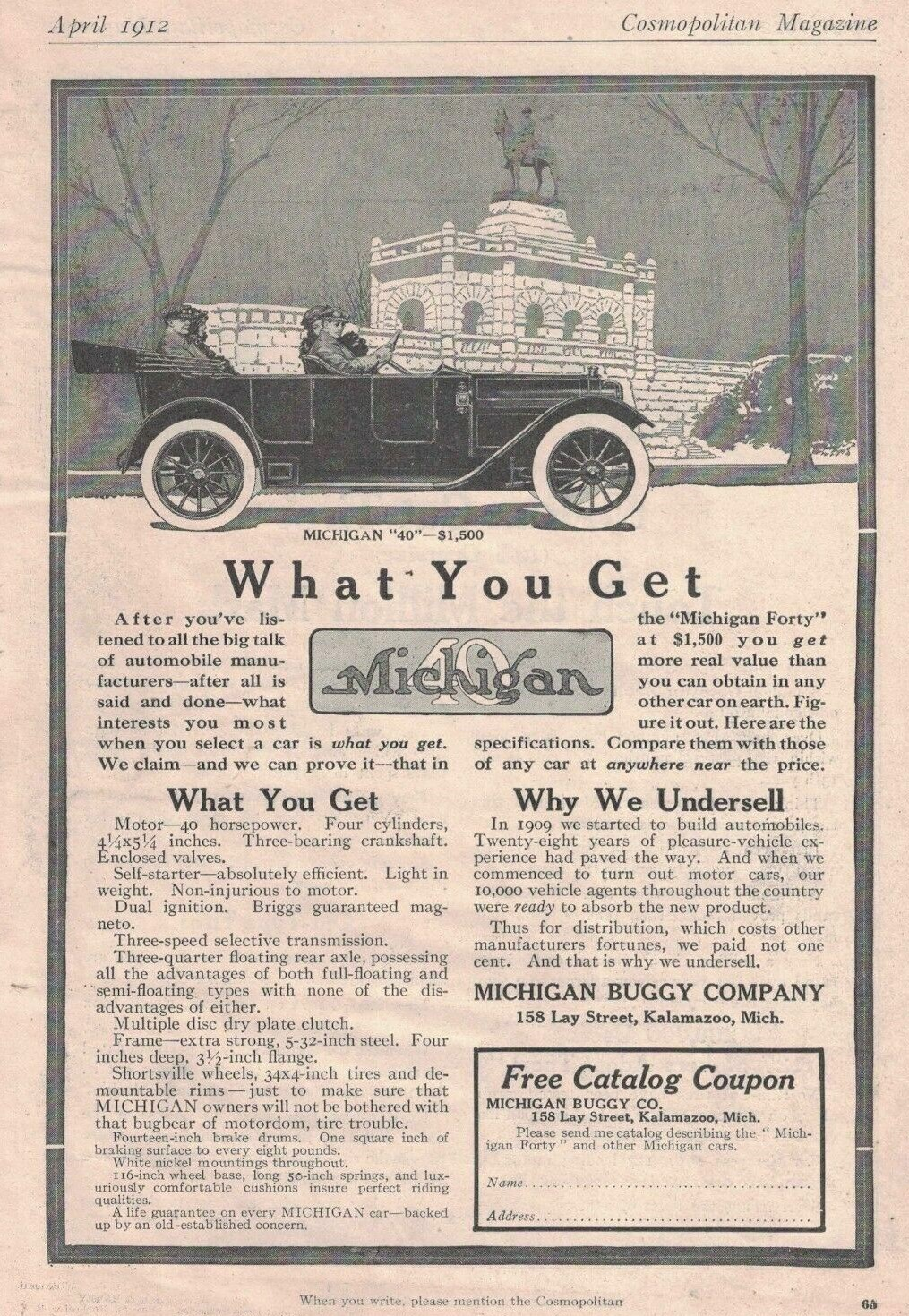
1912 Michigan 40 Advertisement

== See also ==
- The Reynolds-Alberta Museum has an un-restored four-wheel drive 1905 Michigan high-wheeler.
- 1913 Michigan Model R at conceptcarz.com
- Site dedicated to the Michigan Motor Car
- Michigan Buggy Company history at the Kalamazoo Public Library
