= Halladay (automobile) =

Defunct American motor vehicle manufacturer

The Halladay Motor Car company was founded in 1905 in Streator, Illinois, and moved to Ohio in 1917.

== Origins ==
The company originated with the Erie Motor Carriage & Manufacturing Company in Anderson, Indiana, which was bought out in 1902 by Lou P. Halladay. He spent a year earning $30,000 in capital, then renamed the company the Streator Automobile & and Manufacturing Company. The company kept this name until 1913.

== Streator Automobile & and Manufacturing Company ==
The first car came out in 1904 with great secrecy. It was a five-passenger touring car with a four-cylinder engine. The engines came from the Rutenber Motor Company. In 1908, the company added a runabout and a limousine. About 900 cars were made every year. The cars were well-built. In 1910, a Halladay was the only car to finish a 250-mile race in Atlanta. On September 23, 1911, the company fell into receivership, with $250,000 in liabilities. In January 1913, the company's property was sold to the Merchants' Realization Company, which then sold it to Albert C. Barley, the secretary of the Rutenber Motor Company.

== Models ==
Model(year)	Engine	Horsepower	Wheelbase	Transmission	Types
Model B(1905–1907)	4-Cylinder	35-40	108"	N/A	5-passenger touring
Model C(1908)	4-Cylinder	35-40	118"	N/A	Touring-5p; Runabout-3p.; Limo
Model G, G, and E(1909–1910)	4-Cylinder	24-28	100-104"	N/A	Tourabout-4p(G); Surry-4p.(F); Runabout-3p(E)
Model D, D-10(1909–1910)	4-Cylinder	35-40	118-123"	3-speed manual	Tour-5p.;Rbt.-3p.; Limo(1909); Toy Tonneau-5p.
Model J-10, J-30(1910–1911)	4-Cylinder	30	110"	N/A	Rds.-2 passenger; Toy Tonneau(1910)-5p.; Touring-5p.
Model G-30, 30(1911–1912)	4-Cylinder	30	106-112"	N/A	Touring, Surrey, Roadster
Model 40(1911–1914)	4-Cylinder	40	118"	N/A	Toy Tonneau-4p; Touring-4p; Roadster-3p(1911)2p(1912–1914); Winter Front Touring(1911)
Model 32(1913–1914)	4-Cylinder	32	112"	N/A	Touring-5p; Roadster-2p
Model 50(1911)	4-Cylinder	50	128"	N/A	Touring-7p; Toy Tonneauette-4p; Winter Front Touring-7p; Limo-7p
Model 6-50(1912–1914)	6-cylinder	50	128-134"	N/A	Touring-5 passenger; Toy Tonneau-4 passenger

=== Under Albert Barley ===
While under Albert Barley, he named the company Barley Motor Car Company, but still produced the Halladay. After a while, he lost interest in the Halladay, so in 1916 he sold the Halladay to a group of investors headed by T. E. Huth, while he made a new car called the Roamer.

1915-1916	Engine	HP	Wheelbase
Light Six	Six-cylinder	30	122"
Big Six	Six-cylinder	50	134"

== In Ohio ==
In 1917, the group of investors kept making the Halladay, now in Warren, Ohio. They changed the name to Halladay Motor Car Company. They still used a six-cylinder engine provided by Rutenber. The cars were advertised as "sturdy, compact, and low-upkeep". In 1920, the company was moved to Newark, Ohio, where the name was changed to Halladay Motors Corporation. In 1922, the company tried to make a 4-cylinder car called the Falcon, but in March, the company went into receivership again. This was because of charges from the Barber Asphalt Paving Company of Pennsylvania, which had not been paid for work done around the Newark plant. This time, Halladay went out of business.

Model(year)	Engine	HP	Wheelbase	Type
Model S(1917–1919)	Six-Cylinder	N/A	118"	Touring-5 Passenger
Model R(1917–1919)	Six-Cylinder	N/A	122"	Touring-5 passenger; Roadster-3 passenger
Model O(1917–1919)	Six-Cylinder	N/A	136"	Touring-7 passenger
1920–1921	Six-Cylinder	46	116"	Touring-5p.; Roadster-2/3p.; Coupe-4p.; Sedan-5p.
1922	Six-Cylinder	46	115"	Touring-5p.; Roadster-2p.; Victoria-5p.
Falcon	Four-Cylinder	20	115"	Touring, Roadster, Coupe
