= Pennant (automobile) =

Defunct motor vehicle manufacturer

Overview
- Manufacturer: Barley Motor Car Co.
- Model years: 1924–1925

Body and chassis
- Class: Passenger Car, Taxicab
- Related: Barley Motor Car

The Pennant was an automobile marque of the Barley Motor Car Co. in Kalamazoo, Michigan (1924–25) for taxicabs. Barley also made the Roamer (1916–29) and the Barley automobiles (1922–24). The Pennant was a continuation of the Barley configured for taxi service.

== History ==
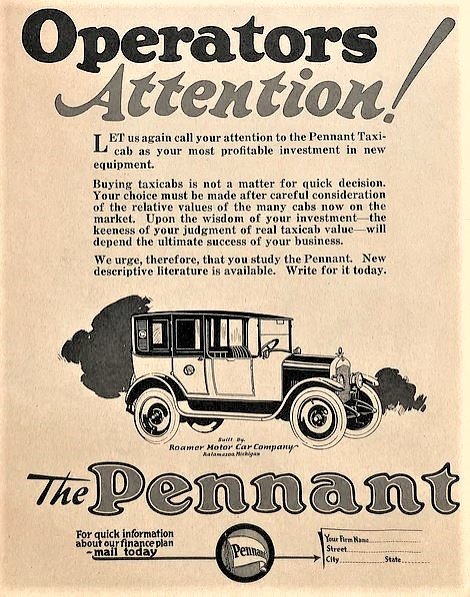
1925 Pennant Taxicab advertisement

Albert C. Barley sold his interest in Roamer in 1924 and the Kalamazoo factory remained the Barley Motor Car Co. and continued to manufacture the Barley. When sales were disappointing, the Pennant taxicab was phased in. It was a Barley with a Buda 4-cylinder engine and targeted at the taxicab market. Its main competitor was the Checker, also built in Kalamazoo.

The Pennant trade dress was a maroon upper body and ivory lower body. Both the Barley and Pennant were discontinued by 1926. After the 1924 reorganization, the Roamer Motor Car Co. was incorporated at Toronto, Ontario, where it was headed by George P. Wigginton. The plan was to move production to Ontario, but this never occurred. A. C. Barley was back in charge of Roamer by 1927.

== See also ==
- Standard Pennant
- Barley Motor Car Co.
- The Pennant Taxicab at SecondChanceGarage
