= Edward Douglas-Pennant =

Edward Douglas-Pennant may refer to:

- Edward Douglas-Pennant, 1st Baron Penrhyn (1800–1886), Scottish landowner in Wales, and politician
- Edward Douglas-Pennant, 3rd Baron Penrhyn (1864–1927), British politician
