= Dafydd Pennant =

Dafydd Pennant was a late 16th-century Welsh poet. Two surviving works are known, a cywydd (written in praise of ‘William of Penrhyn’), and a love poem.
