= Greyhound (automobile company) =

Defunct American motor vehicle manufacturer

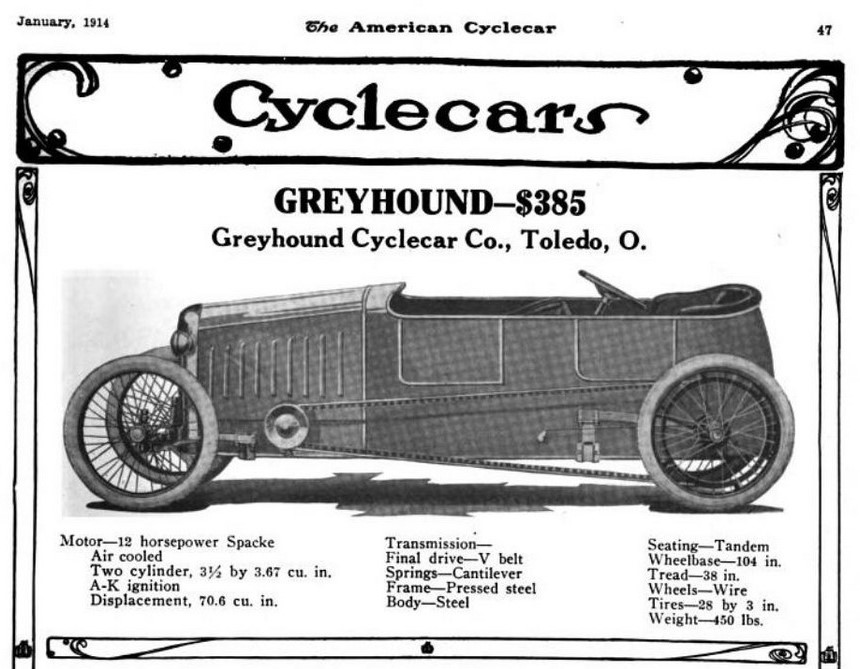
1913 Greyhound Cyclecar advertisement from Carette magazine

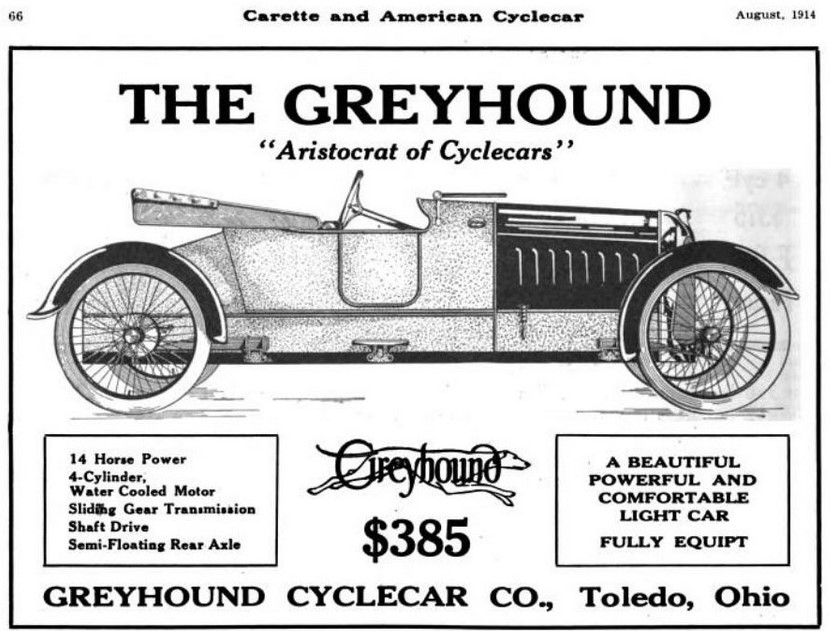
1914 Greyhound Cyclecar advertisement from Carette magazine

The Greyhound Cyclecar Company was created in 1914 in Toledo, Ohio.

== History ==
The original car was designed by E.J.Cooke as a two-passenger, four-cylinder engine cyclecar with electronic ignition. The company said it would deliver 2,400 cars by the end of the year, but this did not happen. So, in 1915, the company moved to Kalamazoo, Michigan. Some confusing name changes then happened, first to Crown Automobile Manufacturing Company (which did not last long), then the States Motor Company, but the car was still called the Greyhound. The car had transformed from a cyclecar to a larger lightcar. In April 1916, a new set of people came and the company was reorganized, and the Greyhound was dropped.

| Model (year) | Engine | HP | Transmission | Wheelbase |
|---|---|---|---|---|
| Cyclecar-2p.(1914–1915) | 4-cylinder | 14/18 | sliding-gear 2-speed | 104" |
| lightcar-2p.(1915–1916) | 4-cylinder | 30 | N/A | 106" |
| lightcar-5p.(1915–1916) | 4-cylinder | 30 | N/A | 106" |
