= Phelps Motor Vehicle =

Defunct American motor vehicle manufacturer

Phelps Motor Vehicle Company
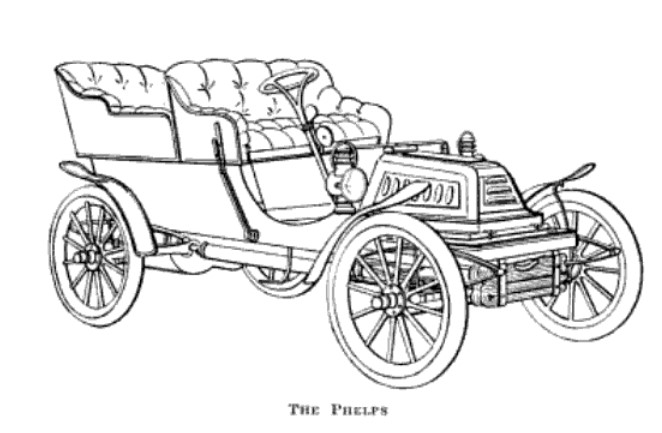
- Sketch of the 1904 Phelps shown at the 4th New York Automobile Show

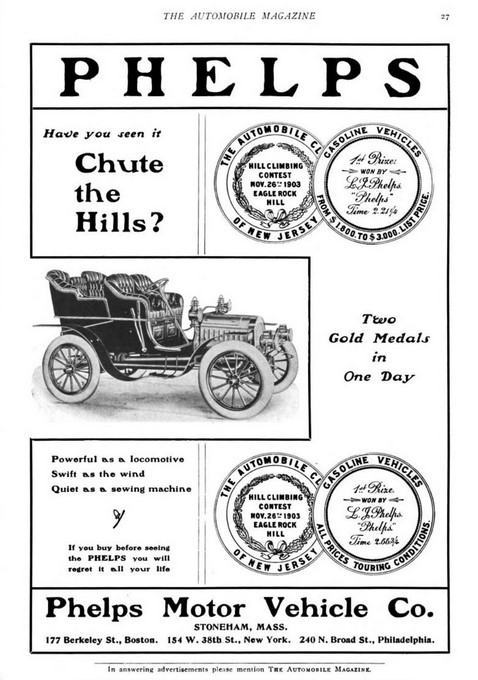
- 1903 Phelps advertisement in The Automobile magazine
- Industry: Automotive
- Founded: 1903; 123 years ago
- Founder: Elliott C. Lee, Lucius J. Phelps
- Defunct: 1905; 121 years ago
- Fate: reorganized
- Successor: Shawmut Motor Company
- Headquarters: Stoneham, Massachusetts, United States
- Products: Automobiles
- Production output: Unknown (1903-1905)

Phelps Motor Vehicle Company was a manufacturer of automobiles in Stoneham, Massachusetts, between 1903 and 1905. In 1906 it was succeeded by the Shamut Motor Company.

== History ==
=== Background ===
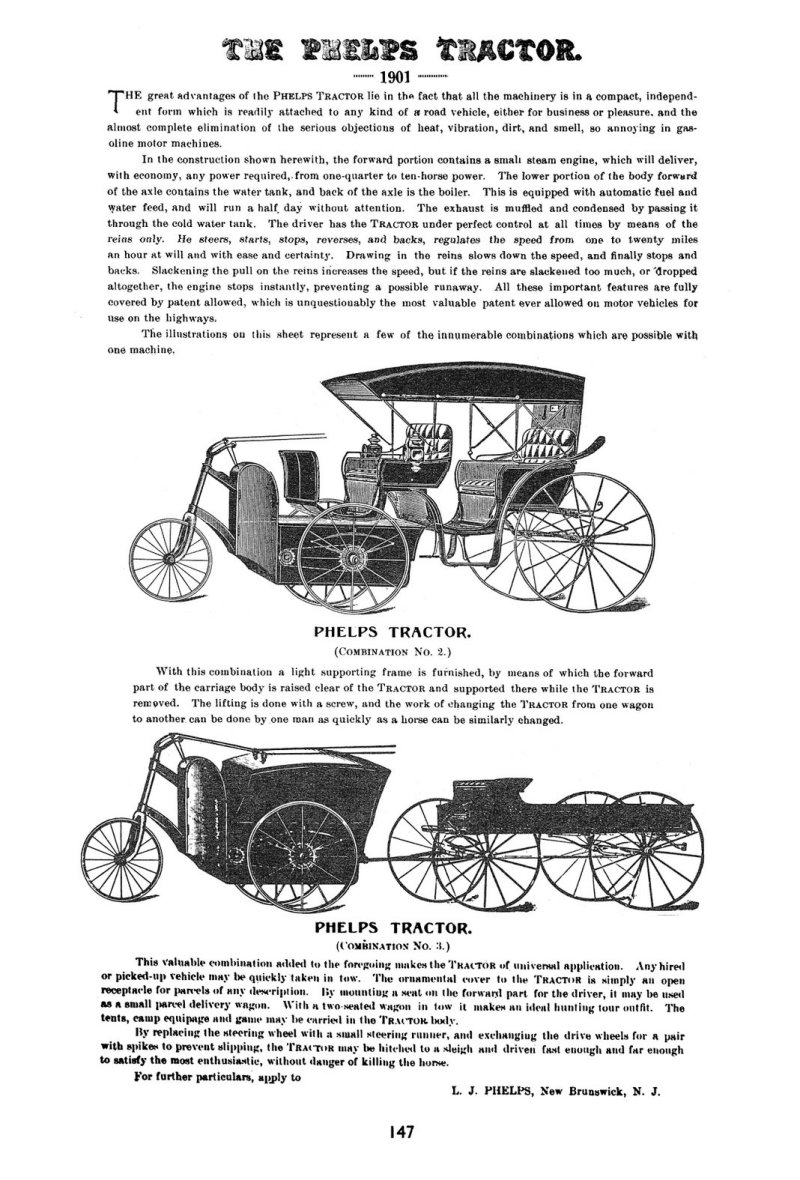
1901 Phelps Tractor steam-powered tricycle from L J Phelps, New Brunswick, NJ advertisement in the Horseless Age magazine

Lucius J. Phelps was an inventor and an electrical and mechanical engineer who first came to prominence in 1886 for his Induction Telegraph patent that was developed for trains to receive live telegraph messages while moving. In the late 1890's he became interested in steam powered vehicles and in 1901 marketed the Phelps Tractor. The steam tractor was designed to be controlled by horse rains so that a coachman could operate it. As Phelps Motor Company, Phelps then began developing a gasoline engine.

=== Phelps Motor Car ===
In 1903 Phelps Motor Company became Phelps Motor Vehicle Company with Elliott C. Lee as president and L. J. Phelps as general manager. The 1903 Phelps was a touring car model, equipped with a tonneau. It could seat 4 passengers and sold for $2,000, equivalent to $71,667 in 2025. L. J. Phelps designed the vertically mounted water-cooled straight-3 engine, situated at the front of the car, producing 15 hp (11 kW; 15 PS). A 3-speed transmission was fitted. The car was unusual in that it did not have a parameter frame but a backbone frame that enclosed the drive shaft, and this weight savings made for a 1,500 lb (680 kg) touring car. In 1904 the engine was enlarged to 20-hp and the price was $2,500, equivalent to $89,583 in 2025.

=== Motorsports ===
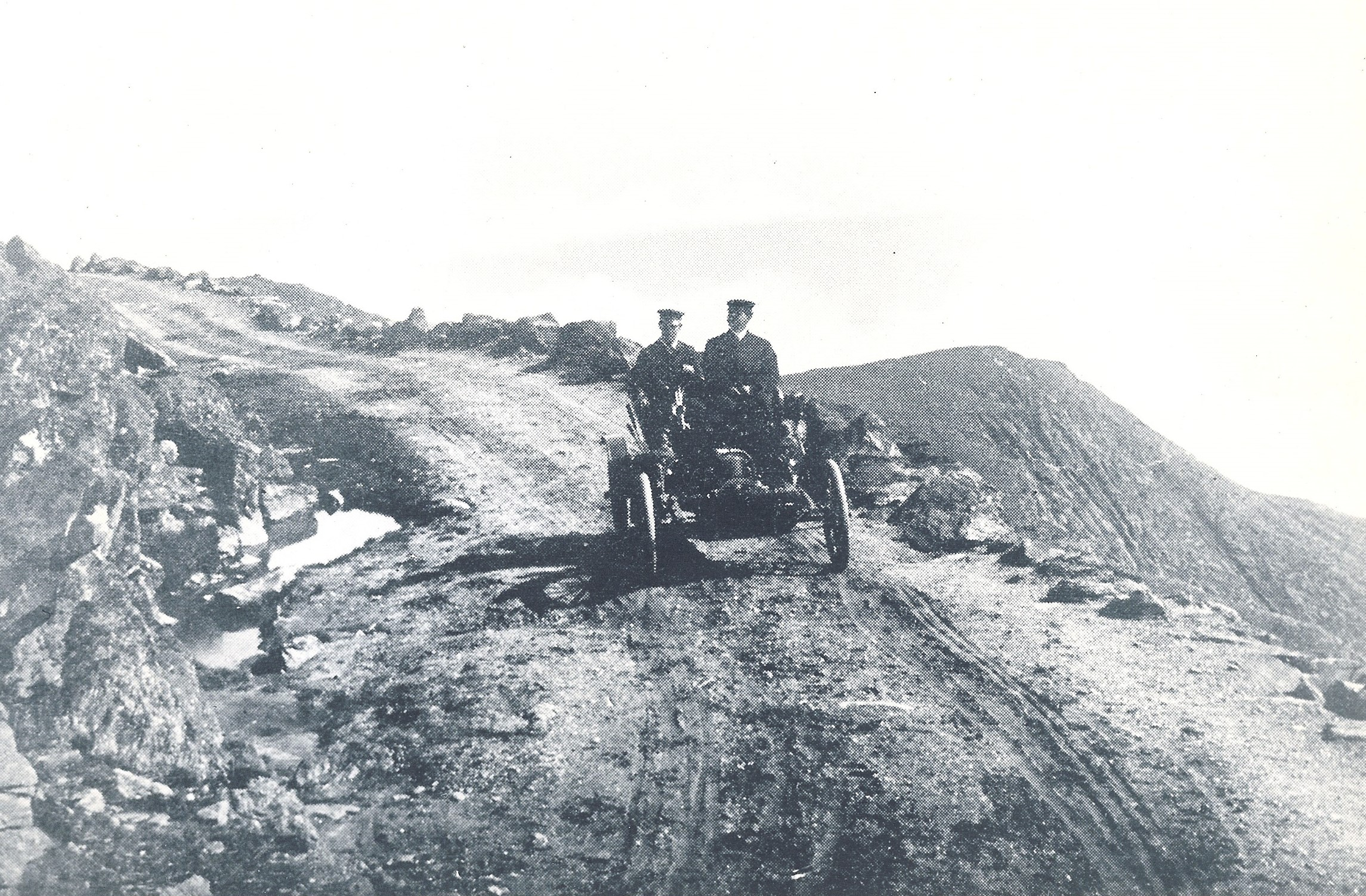
L. J. Phelps descending Mt. Washington after his record climb in his 1903 model 15-hp Phelps

Phelps demonstrated his car in several endurance runs and hill climbs including a 1903 record 1 hour and 46 minute climb up Mount Washington. He returned in 1904 for the first Climb to the Clouds and cut his time to 42 minutes, placing second in his class. The Phelps motor car won a double victory in the1903 Eagle Rock, N.J. Hill Climb.

=== Fate ===
L. J. Phelps designed a 4-cylinder engine but in September 1905 decided to retire to his Forty Oaks Ranch in Paradise, California. The company and manufacturing plant were succeeded by the Shawmut Motor Company headed by E. C. Lee in 1906. Lucius Phelps continued to patent automotive and other devices until his death at the age of 75 in 1925.

=== Models ===
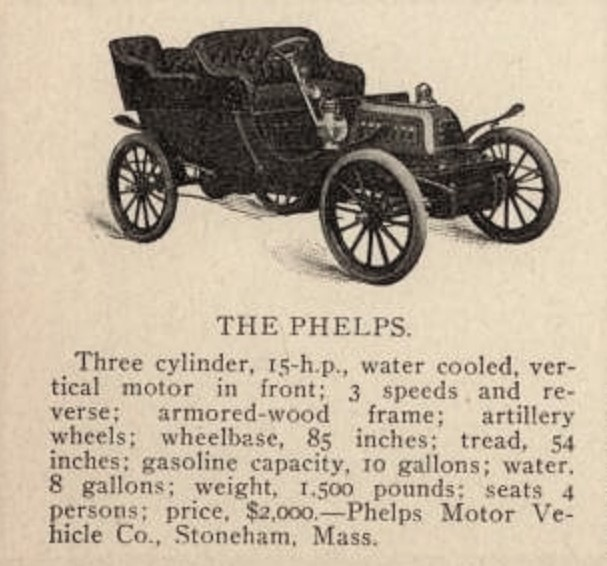
1903 Phelps 15-hp Tonneau Touring car from The Automobile magazine

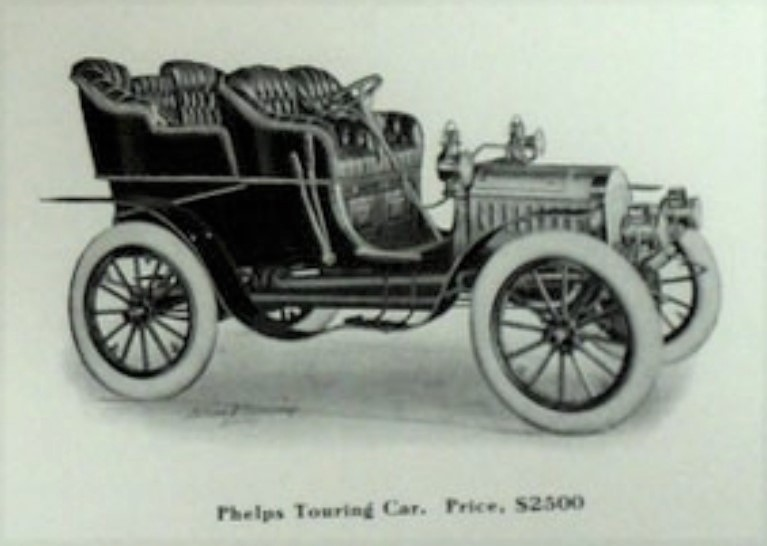
1904 Phelps 25-hp Touring Car from brochure

== See also ==
- Explore Stoneham - Car Industry in Stoneham
- Mt. Washington Road Auto Road history
- Phelps images at Detroit Public Library
