= M. Robert Guggenheim =

American diplomat (1885-1959)

Meyer Robert Guggenheim
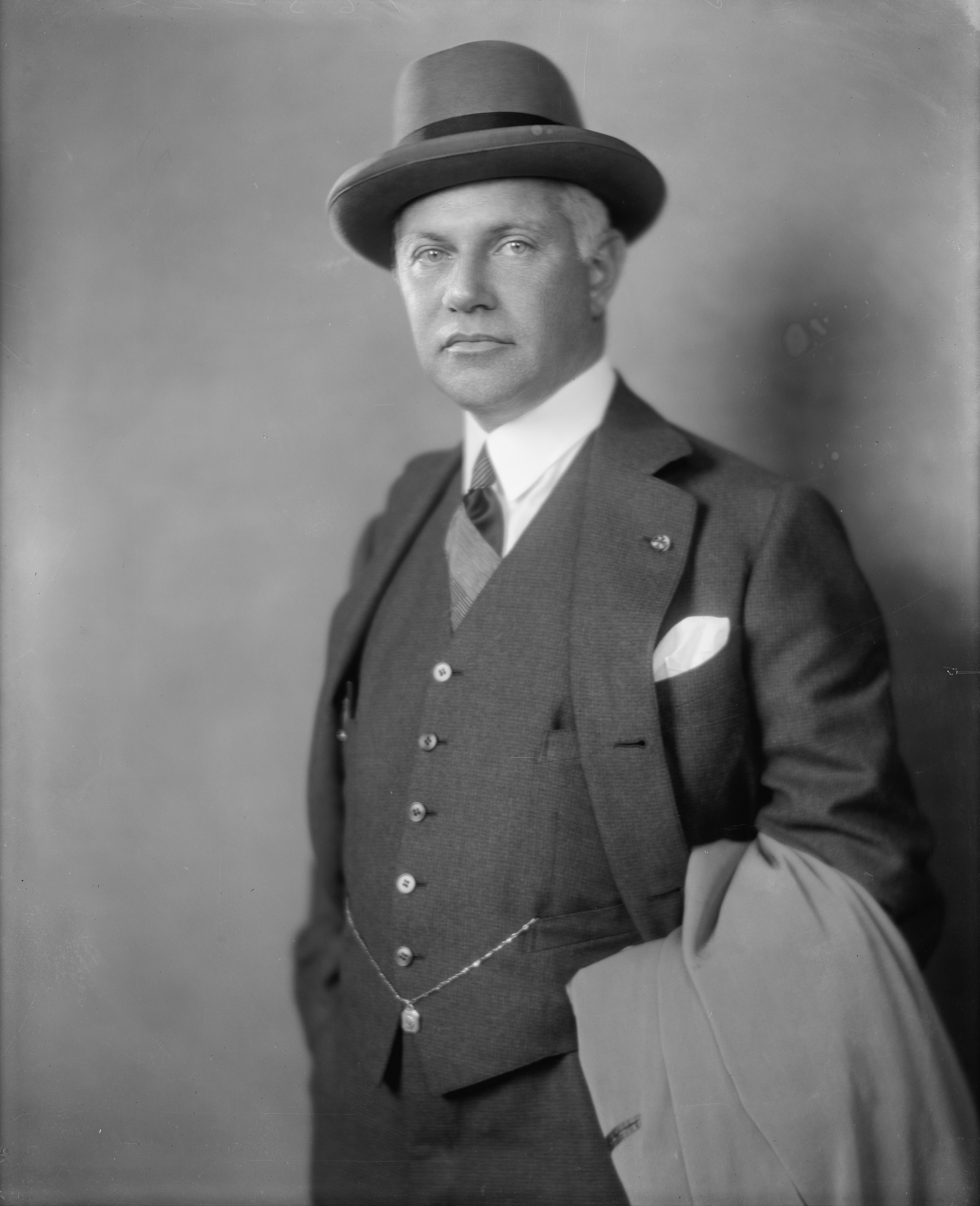

United States Ambassador to Portugal
- In office August 12, 1953 – September 19, 1954
- Preceded by: Cavendish W. Cannon
- Succeeded by: James C. H. Bonbright

Personal details
- Born: May 17, 1885 New York City, New York, U.S.
- Died: November 16, 1959 (aged 74) Washington, D.C.
- Parent: Daniel Guggenheim (father)
- Relatives: Guggenheim family
- Education: Columbia University

Meyer Robert Guggenheim (May 17, 1885 – November 16, 1959) was an American diplomat and a member of the Guggenheim family.

== Biography ==
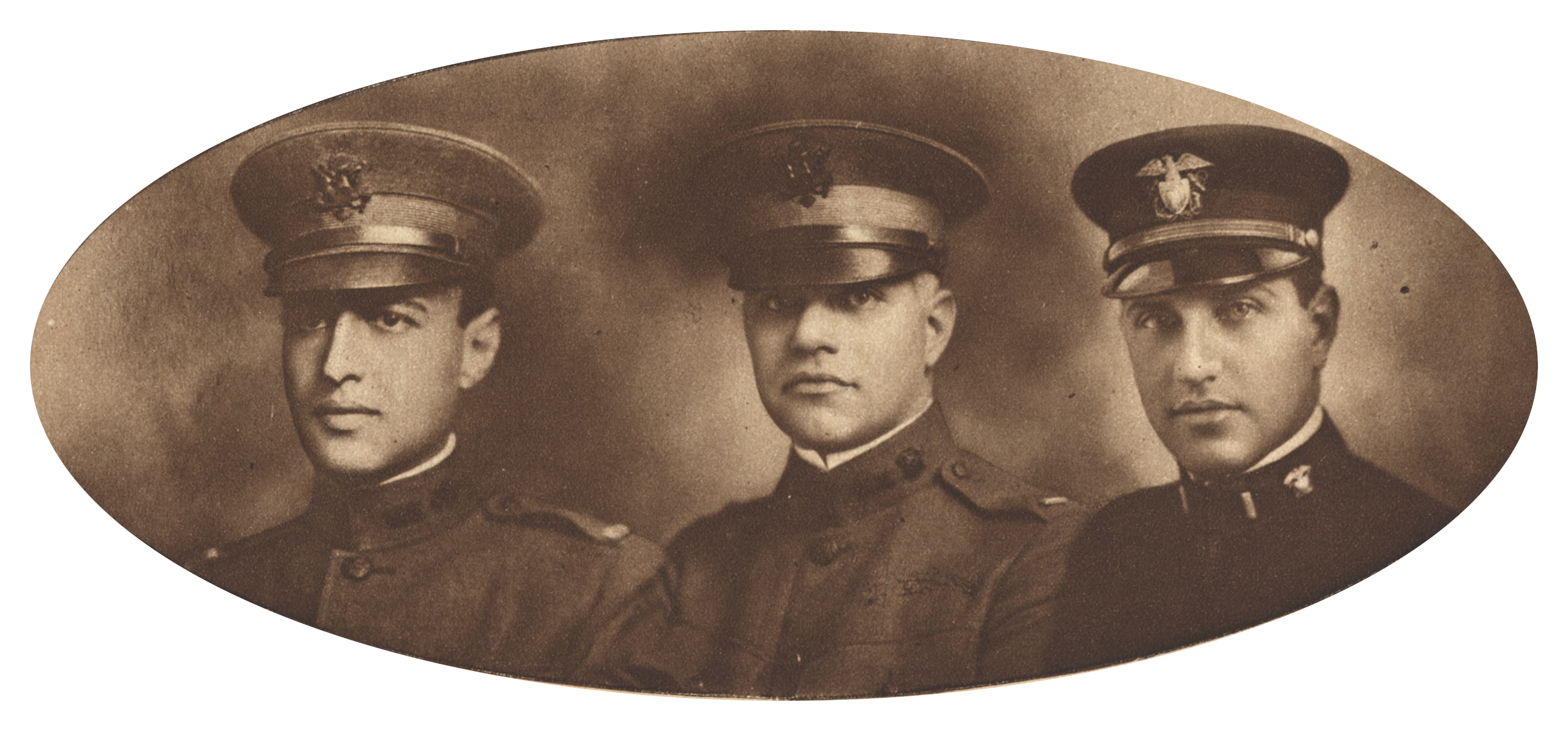
Guggenheim (center) with his brother Harry (right) and brother-in-law Roger W. Straus c. February 1918

Born in New York City, he was the son of Daniel Guggenheim (1856–1930), brother of Harry Frank Guggenheim, and nephew of Simon Guggenheim. In January 1938, he married his 4th wife Rebecca Pollard in Miami Beach on his yacht Firenze. Pollard had finalized her divorce to William van Lennep a week earlier. After Guggenheim's death she married John Logan.

He attended Columbia College with the class of 1907, but left before graduation. In 1909 he donated the trophy and prize money for the Ocean to Ocean Automobile Endurance Contest that coincided with the Alaska–Yukon–Pacific Exposition. As the contest was underway; he was arrested for speeding in New York City - a possible publicity stunt.

He served with the United States Army during World War I. He was appointed United States Ambassador to Portugal, serving between 1953 and 1954.

Guggenheim died in Washington, D.C., in 1959, aged 74, and was interred in Arlington National Cemetery in Arlington, Virginia.

Diplomatic posts
Preceded by Cavendish W. Cannon	U.S. Ambassador to Portugal; 1953–1954	Succeeded by James C. H. Bonbright
