= Ocean to Ocean Automobile Endurance Contest =

One-time automobile race in the U.S.

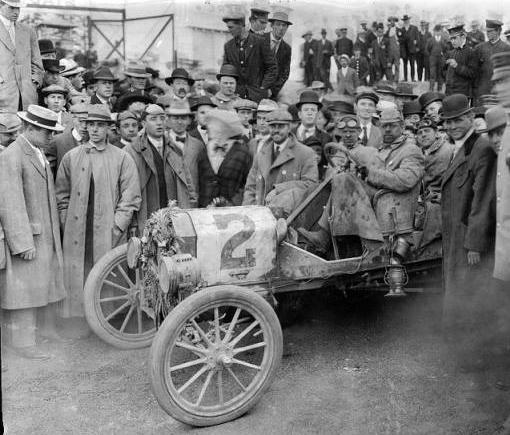
1909 Ford Model T Ocean-to-Ocean race winner

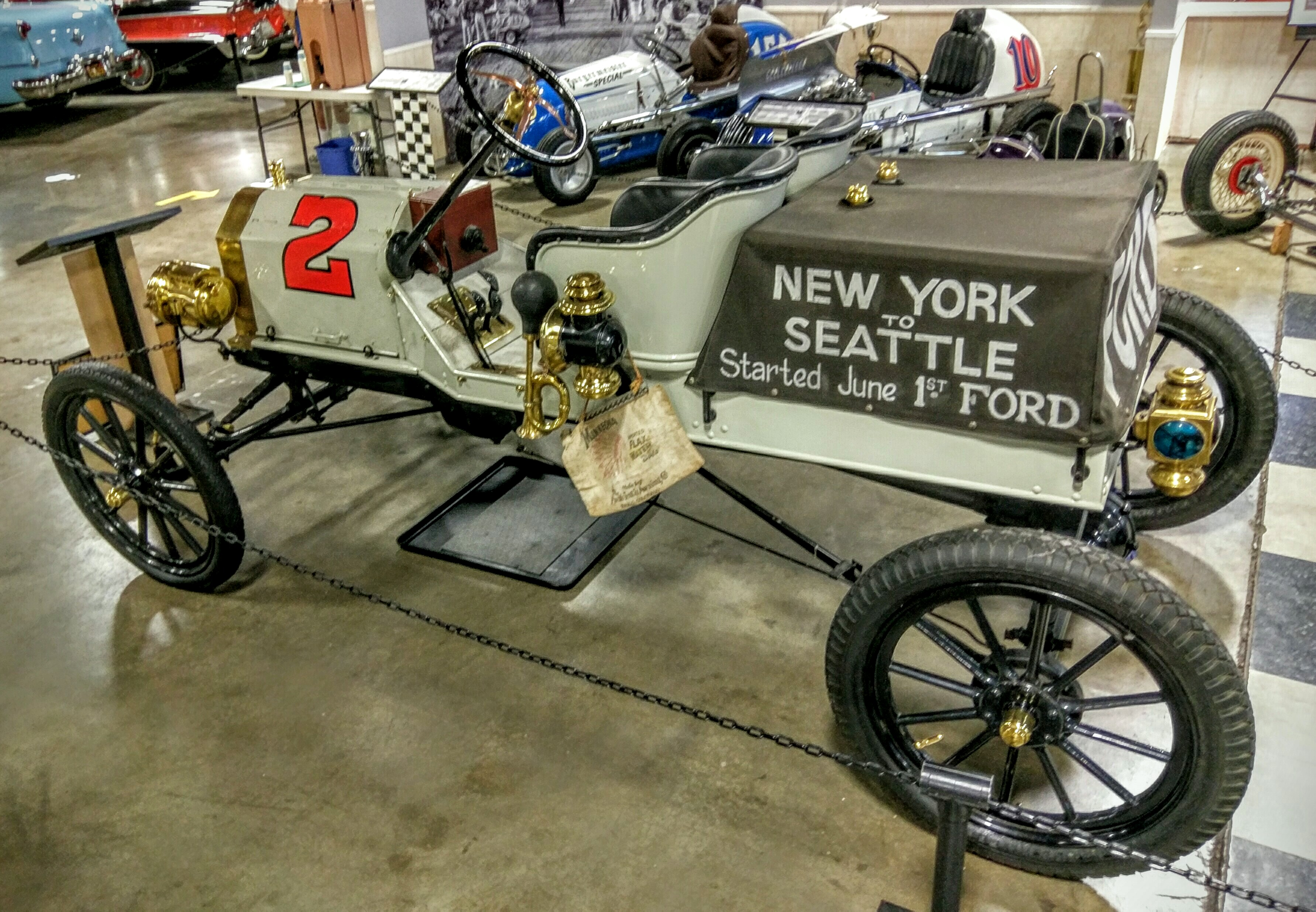
The 1909 Model T Ford race winner on display at the California Automobile Museum

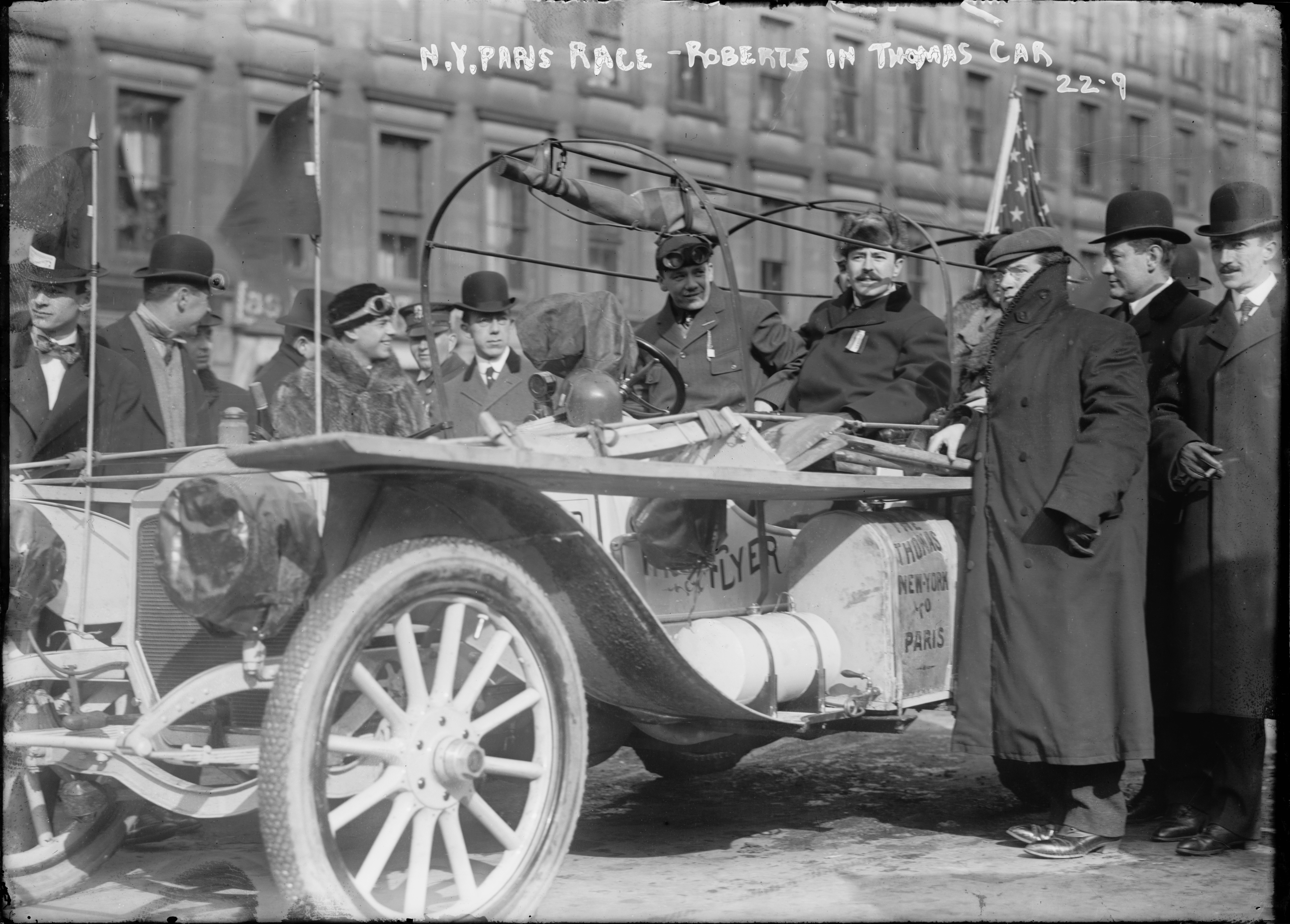
The pace car that established the official route was a Thomas Flyer, the winner of the 1908 New York to Paris Race

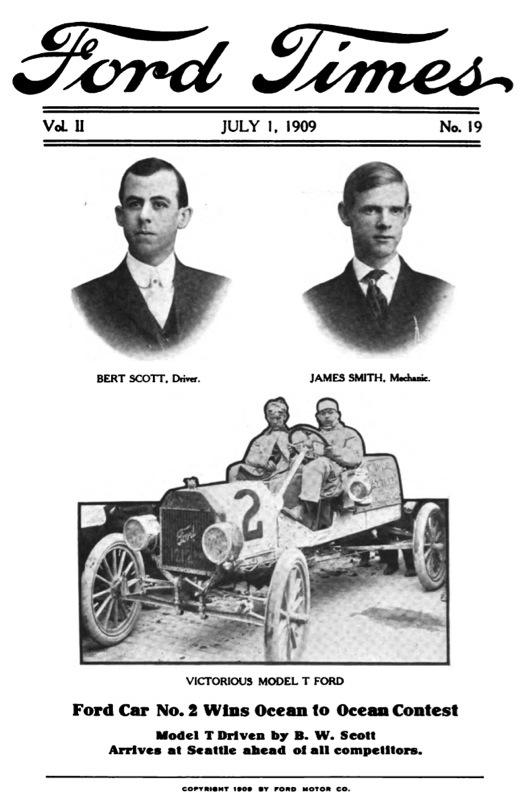
Henry Ford widely publicized his victory

The Ocean to Ocean Automobile Endurance Contest was a transcontinental automobile race held in 1909. The race began in New York City on June 1, 1909 and the first car reached Seattle on June 23. The race was held in conjunction with the Alaska–Yukon–Pacific Exposition, a world's fair held in Seattle, and both events began on the same day.

== Background ==
The race was co-sponsored by the Automobile Club of America, the Seattle Automobile Club, the Alaska–Yukon–Pacific Exposition and Henry Ford. The prize money and the trophy were donated by M. Robert Guggenheim. The first place prize was $2000.00 and the second prize was $1500.00.

The route was surveyed in advance by a designated pioneer car, a Thomas Flyer that had won the 1908 New York to Paris Race. It took two months for the Thomas car to establish a practical route, emphasizing the poor condition of roads at that time.

East of the Mississippi River, the race was an endurance run. The cars could operate only during daylight hours and had to observe local speed limits. West of the Mississippi, where roads were more primitive, the competitors had no limits on either speed or hours of operation.

== The race ==
In the publicity before the race began, Henry Ford predicted that it would "give Americans an opportunity to appreciate the vast possibilities of the motor car".

At the beginning of the race, commentators observed that the two light weight Model Ts seemed like "pygmies" compared to their heavier and more powerful competitors. As the race proceeded, the advantages of the Model T became apparent. Although smaller, it had a superior weight to power ratio. In addition, the Ford Motor Company already had established dealers across the country who were prepared to offer prompt and professional repair services. Ford's strongest competitor, a more powerful Shawmut, lacked access to dealerships after the race cars left New York.

The competitors encountered many obstacles. The Ford team reported running out of gas, fires, getting lost, axle deep mud, and quicksand. The race leaders encountered heavy snow at the Snoqualmie Pass in the final days of the race, which was considered the most difficult part of the course.

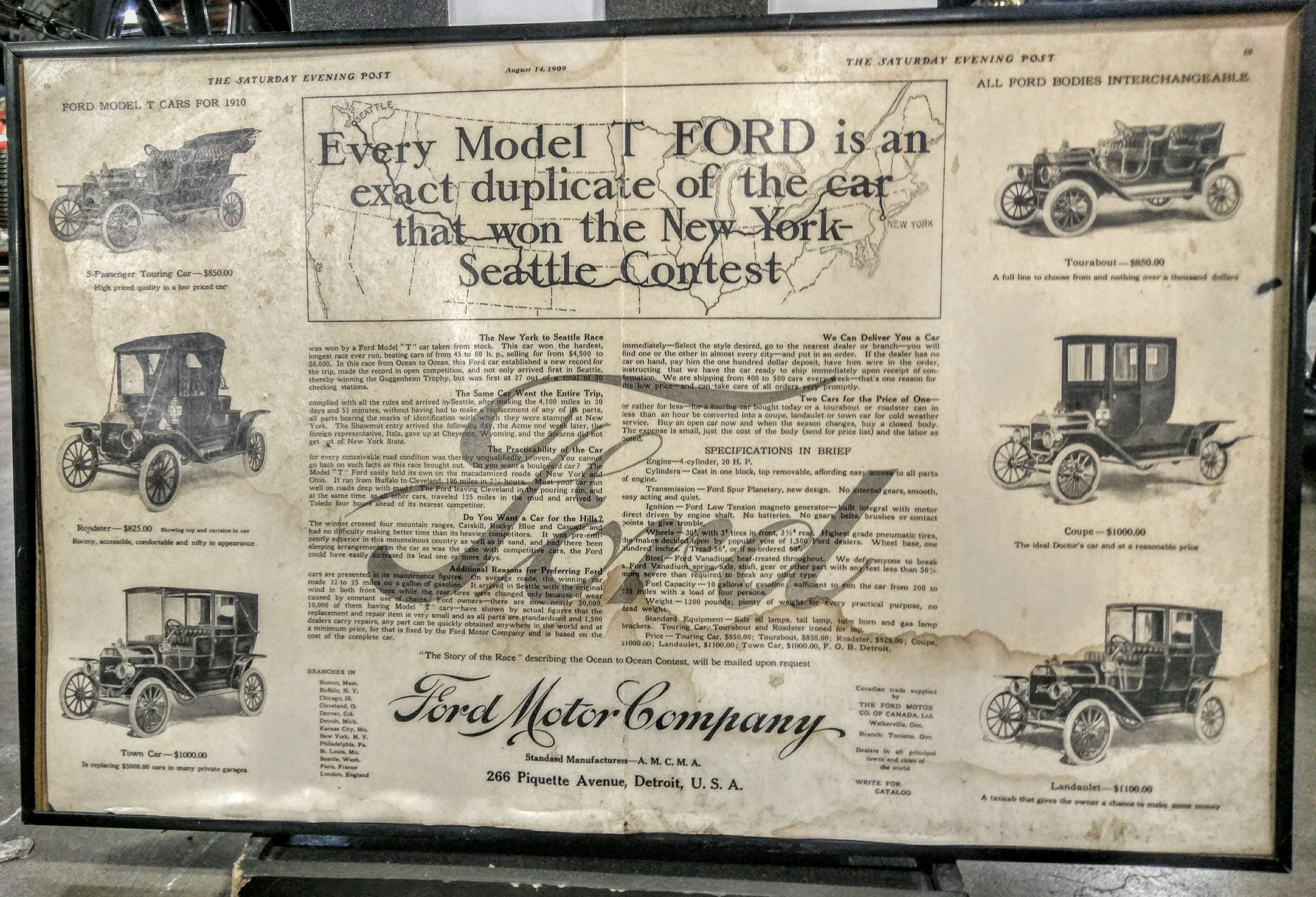
A 1909 Ford advertisement in the Saturday Evening Post promoted the race performance of the Model T.

The race was covered by major newspapers such as the New York Times which reported details as the cars approached Seattle.

== Contested result ==
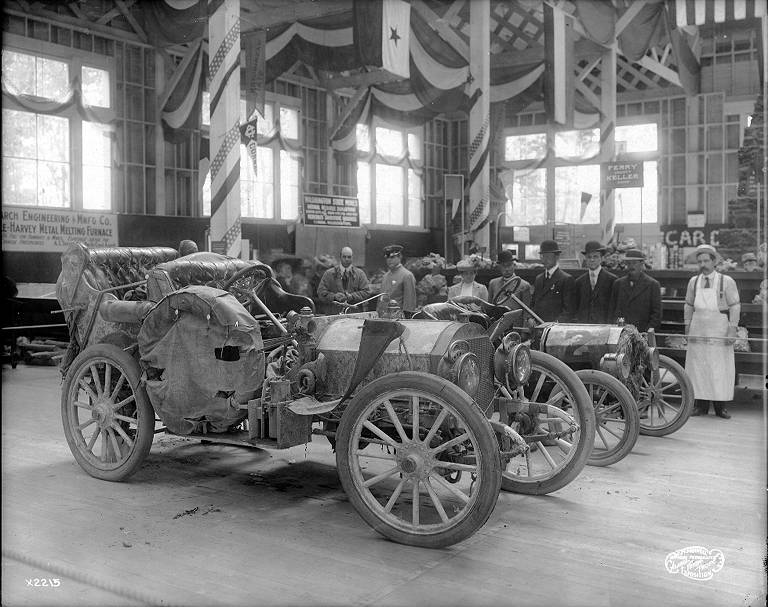
In foreground, the Shawmut that won the Ocean to Ocean Automobile Endurance Contest. The Ford No. 2 car is behind it.

The Ford No. 2 car, a stripped down Model T, was the first to cross the finish line after 23 days on the road. This was the second year of Model T production, and Henry Ford immediately advertised the race results heavily, and the Model T went on to be the best selling car in the first half of the 20th century.

Five months later, the Ford No. 2 car was disqualified because it had an engine changed during the race, in violation of the rules. The second place Shawmut car was awarded the win, but that company went out of business while the Ford Motor Company thrived.

== Centennial re-enactment ==
The race was re-enacted in 2009. Fifty-five Model T Fords participated in the re-enactment, representing all 50 of the United States and five foreign countries.
