= Shawmut Motor Company =

Defunct American motor vehicle manufacturer

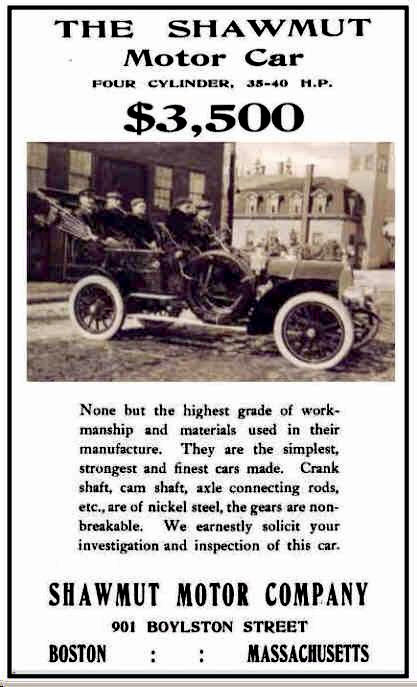
- 1907 Shawmut Motor Car advertisement
- Industry: Automotive
- Predecessor: Phelps Motor Vehicle Company
- Founded: 1905; 121 years ago
- Founder: Elliott C. Lee, president
- Defunct: 1909; 117 years ago
- Fate: ceased production due to factory fire
- Headquarters: Stoneham, Massachusetts, offices in Boston, Massachusetts, United States
- Key people: Elliott C. Lee, president and Horace G. Waite, manager
- Products: automobiles
- Production output: unknown (1906-1908)

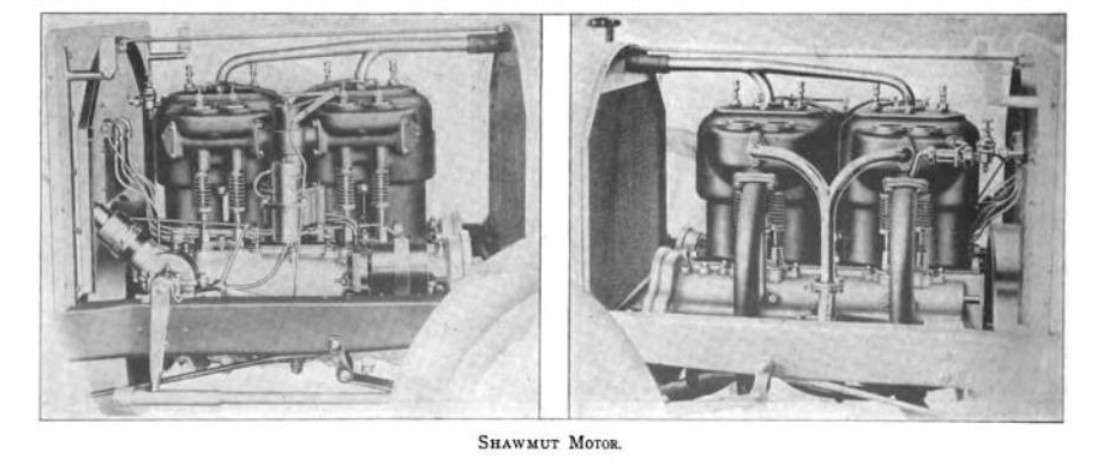
Shawmut 4-cylinder 40hp motor, from article in 1908 Horseless Age magazine

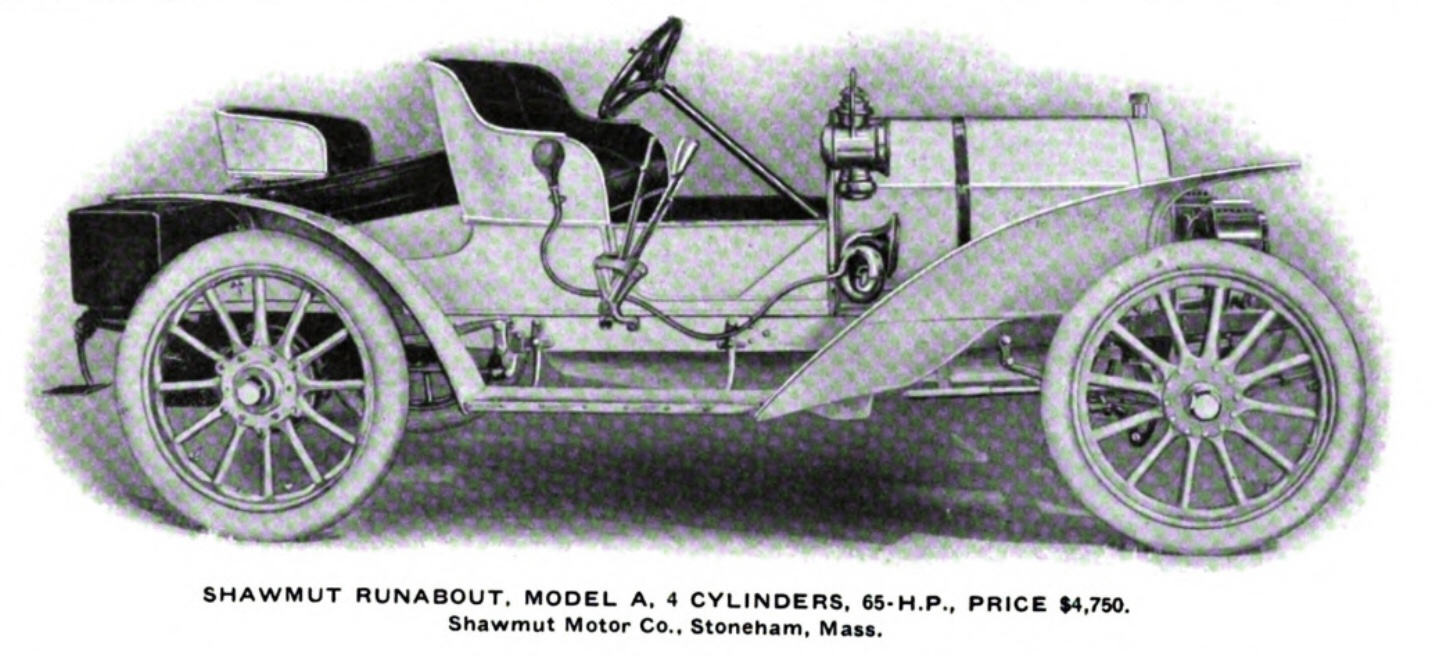
Shawmut Model A (1908)

The Shawmut Motor Company was organized in Stoneham, Massachusetts in 1905 to succeed the Phelps automobile. The Shawmut was manufactured from 1906 to 1908, when the factory was destroyed by fire. The company was headquartered in Boston. A 1908 Shawmut Roundabout was the winner of the 1909 Ocean to Ocean Automobile Endurance Contest.

== History ==
The Shawmut Motor Company was organized in November, 1905 to succeed the Phelps Motor Vehicle Company. Elliott C. Lee, past president of the American Automobile Association, was announced as president of Shawmut. L. J. Phelps had designed a 4-cylinder engine before retiring to California in 1905. For 1906, the first Shawmut was the Model 6, a luxury automobile with a four-cylinder 40-hp touring car body costing $4,750, equivalent to $170,208 in 2025. The new Shawmut was introduced in March 1906 at the Boston Automobile Show, and December at the New York Show.

From 1907, a less expensive Roundabout (short wheelbase touring car with no doors) model was produced for $3,500, equivalent to $120,937 in 2025. For 1907 Shawmuts were designated Models A, B, C and D, representing roadster, touring, limousine and landaulet body styles, priced from $4,750 to $6,500, equivalent to $224,598 in 2025. All body styles were made with sheet aluminum by Boston's premier coachbuilder, Chauncy Thomas & Company.

In 1908 Shawmut engaged the Hol-Tan Company as their New York agency, with the intention to market cars as Hol-Tan Shawmut.

On November 13, 1908 the Shawmut factory in Stoneham was destroyed by fire. Twenty cars of which 10 were finished were in the buildings. The loss of several buildings, manufacturing equipment and cars was judged to be $115,000. Shawmut was carrying $42,000 in Insurance.

In December 1908, the Shawmut Motor Company scouted Reading, Massachusetts for a factory site and in February 1909 scouted Fitchburg before finally settling on a new factory location in South Boston in April. Shawmut could not raise the capital needed to re-start production and were closed by November 1909.

== Motorsports ==
In October 1907 two Shawmuts participated in the Bay State Endurance Run, driven by Arthur Ayers and Harold Church. Church's Shawmut with a perfect score, was declared the winner with a Studebaker and Franklin when a tie run-off could not determine a single winner.

In May 1908, a Hol-Tan Shawmut participated in the First American International Road Race (Briarcliff Trophy Race) driven by William M. Hilliard. It was running with other cars on the 8th lap when the race was called.

A Shawmut Roundabout was entered in the June 1909 Ocean to Ocean Automobile Endurance Contest from New York to Seattle. It was driven by T. Arthur Pettengill, Robert Messer and Earle Chapin. The Shawmut was the second to arrive in Seattle, behind the No. 2 Ford Model T. Decades later, Earle Chapin described the 23 day race as a “fight for survival".

The Shawmut team made a formal protest against the No. 2 Ford Model T stating it should be disqualified. This was disallowed and the Model T was declared the winner. Four months later, it was recognized that the Ford Model T arrived in Seattle with a different engine from the start of the race. In November 1909, the No. 2 Ford was disqualified and the Shawmut declared the winner.

=== Gallery ===
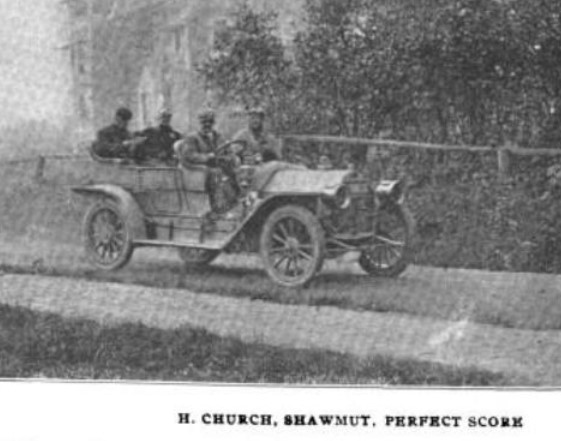
Harold Church driving the 1907 Shawmut Model B Touring to a perfect score finish in the Bay State Endurance Run.

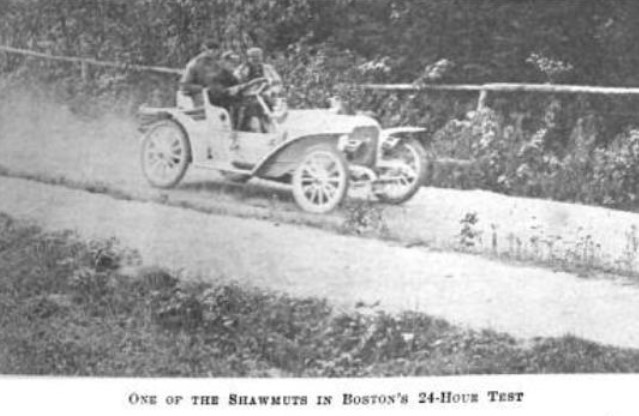
Arthur Ayers driving the 1907 Shawmut Model A Roadster in the Bay State Endurance Run. Perfect score on the first day, but later got stuck in sand.

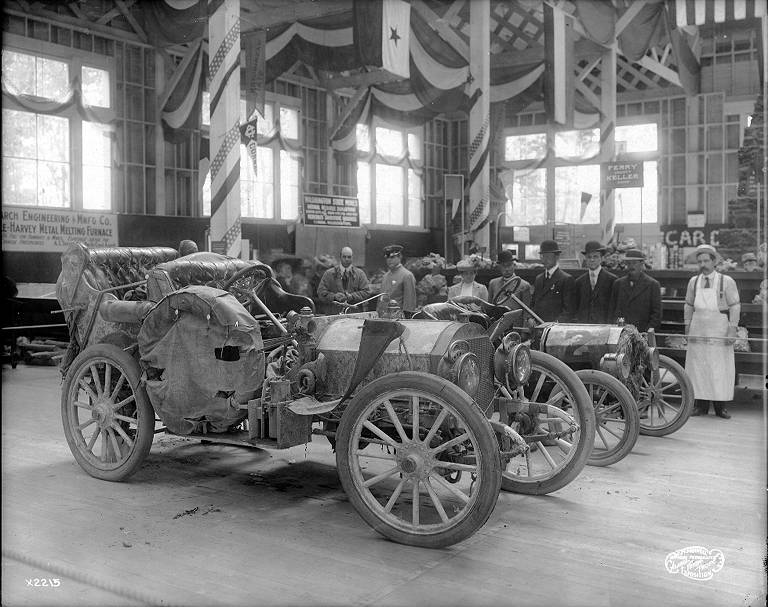
In foreground, the Shawmut that won the 1909 Ocean to Ocean Automobile Endurance Contest; behind that, the Model T that was disqualified, displayed at the 1909 Alaska-Yukon-Pacific Exposition in Seattle.

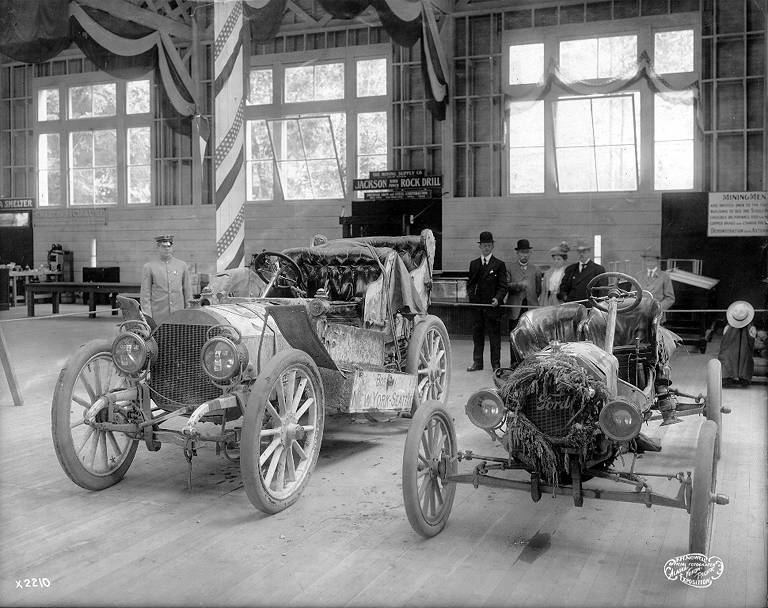
Left, the 1908 Shawmut Roundabout with the winning (later disqualified) Model T Ford at the Alaska-Yukon-Pacific Exposition in Seattle.
