= Timeline of motor vehicle brands =

This is a chronological index for the start year for motor vehicle brands (up to 1969). For manufacturers that went on to produce many models, it represents the start date of the whole brand; for the others, it usually represents the date of appearance of the main (perhaps only) model that was produced.

This also gives an idea of what motor vehicles were appearing on the streets in each country around each date (allowing, too, for imports from other countries). Moreover, by showing which models were contemporary, it gives a first indication of how individual designers were being influenced by each other, and a flavor of the entrepreneurial spirit and dynamics of the pioneering days of motor vehicle manufacture.

Within each year, and country of origin, the lists are structured according to the type of vehicle first introduced. These include the following types: steam, electric, hybrid electric, internal-combustion, touring car, roadster, tonneau, phaeton, cyclecar, light car, voiturette, runabout, high wheeler, buggy, tricar, motor quadricycle, motor tricycle, motorcycle, coach, bus, fire-engine, truck, tractor, racing car, avant-train.

== Veteran era ==
=== 1852? ===
Russia. Motorcycle: Alexander Leutner & Co.

=== 1860 ===
Thomas Rickett's steam-powered car was particularly notable in the history of motor vehicle production inasmuch as several examples were made, and it was also advertised.

UK. Steam: Rickett

=== 1861 ===
US. Steam: Ware Steam Wagon

=== 1873 ===
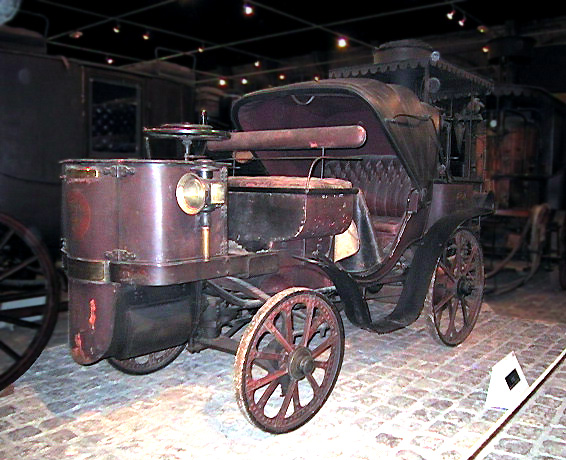
Amédée père designed the Mancelle, which is regarded as the first automobile to be put into series production - 1878

The Bollée family played a significant part in the history of motor vehicle manufacture; the father with his steam car, and one of his sons, in 1895, with an internal-combustion engine design.

France. Steam bus: Amédée Bollée

=== 1880 ===
Netherlands: Spyker: carriages, later internal combustion.

=== 1883 ===
France. Steam: De Dion-Bouton (later internal-combustion, with a patent in 1889)

=== 1884 ===
France. Internal-combustion: Delamare-Deboutteville

=== 1885 ===
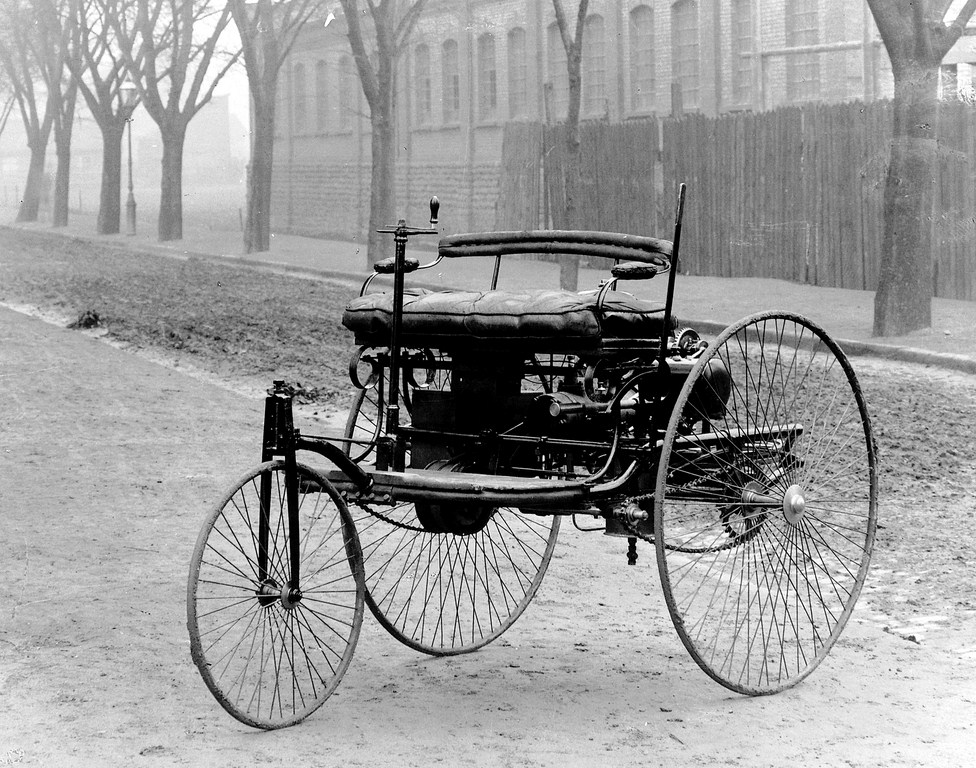
1885 Benz Tri-Car - first true automobile

Karl Benz's vehicle was the first true automobile, entirely designed as such, rather than simply being a motorized stage coach or horse carriage. This is why he was granted his patent, and is regarded as its inventor. His wife, Bertha became the first true motorist, in 1889, when she took their sons out for the specific task of paying a visit to her family.

Germany. Internal-combustion: Benz

UK. Internal-combustion: Butler

US. Electric: Armstrong Electric

=== 1887 ===
UK. Motorcycle: New Imperial

=== 1889 ===
The first Daimler vehicle was a converted carriage, but with innovations that are still adopted today (cushioned engine mountings, fan cooling, finned-radiator water cooling).

France. Steam: Peugeot (later internal-combustion, and the first to be entered in an organised race, albeit for bicycles, Paris–Brest–Paris)

Germany. Internal-combustion: Daimler (DMG)

UK. Internal-combustion: Santler

US. Internal-combustion rotary engine: Adams-Farwell

=== 1890 ===
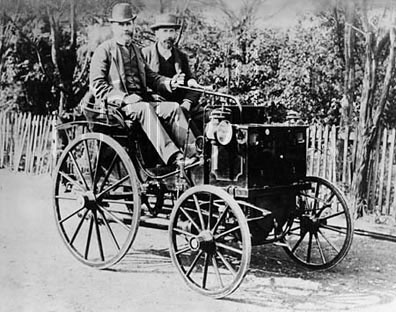
Panhard-Levassor (1890–1895). This model was the first automobile to circulate in Portugal

Panhard and Levassor's design of a front-mounted engine established the layout of the majority of cars since then.

France. Internal-combustion: Panhard-Levassor

=== 1891 ===
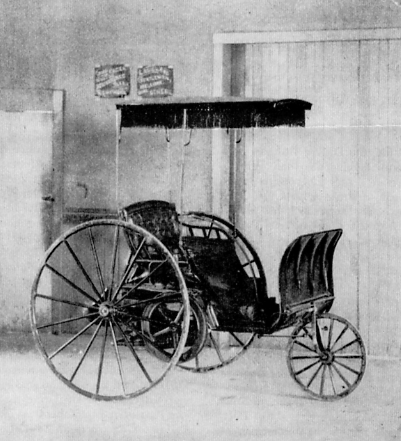
The 1891 Buckeye Gasoline Buggy

US. Steam: Black; steam tractor: Avery; internal-combustion: Buckeye gasoline buggy

=== 1893 ===
France. Electric (and later internal-combustion): Jeantaud

Germany. Internal-combustion: MAN Nutzfahrzeuge AG (later MAN Truck & Bus)

UK. Steam: Straker-Squire (also known as Brazil Straker)

US. Internal-combustion: Elmore, Duryea

=== 1894 ===
France. Internal-combustion: Audibert & Lavirotte, Berliet, Delahaye

UK. Electric: Garrard & Blumfield

US. Electric: Electrobat

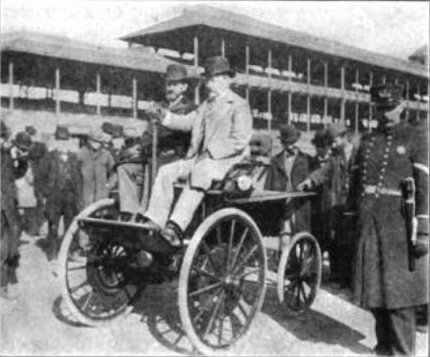
Morris and Salom in the 1894 Electrobat

=== 1895 ===
France. Internal-combustion: Léon Bollée, Corre, Rochet-Schneider

UK. Internal-combustion: Knight, Lanchester

Austria-Hungary. Internal-combustion: Laurin & Klement (later Škoda)

US. Electric: Morris & Salom

US. Internal-combustion: De La Vergne

=== 1896 ===
In the UK, the Locomotives on Highways Act 1896 replaced the hugely restrictive Locomotive Acts of 1861, 1865 and 1878 (the so-called Red Flag acts) thereby finally freeing up the automotive industry in the UK (and, incidentally, was also the origin of the celebrations of the first London to Brighton Veteran Car Run). Knight had been convicted under the old act, the previous year, for not having a man precede his vehicle with a red flag, and Walter Arnold was the first person to be convicted, in January 1896, for exceeding the speed limit. Meanwhile, Serpollet was issued with what was effectively the first driving licence.

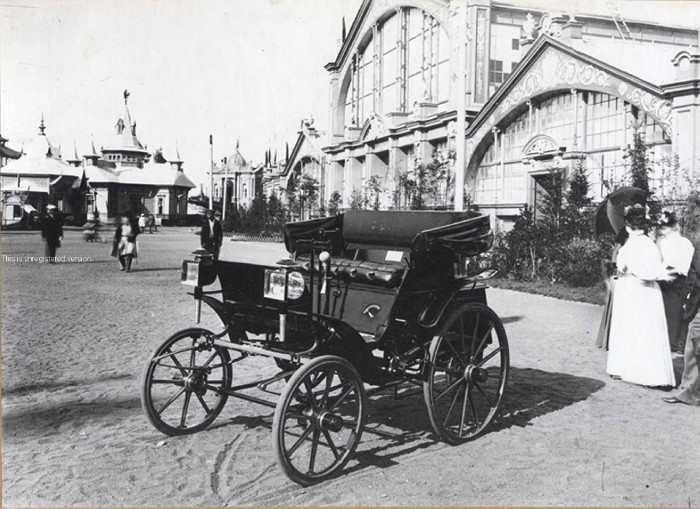
1896 Yakovlev-Frese

France. Steam: Gardner-Serpollet; internal-combustion: Clément-Gladiator, Dalifol, Darracq, Lorraine-Dietrich, Triouleyre; voiturette: Dalifol & Thomas, Goujon, Léon Bollée; motorcycle: Clément and Gladiator

Italy. Internal-combustion: Enrico Bernardi

Russia. Internal-combustion: Yakovlev-Frese

UK. Steam: Leyland; internal-combustion: Anglo-French, Arnold, Arrol-Johnston, Atkinson and Philipson; motorcycle: Excelsior, motor tricycle: Ariel

US. Internal-combustion: Altham, Black, Electric & internal-combustion: Brewster, Haynes-Apperson

=== 1897 ===
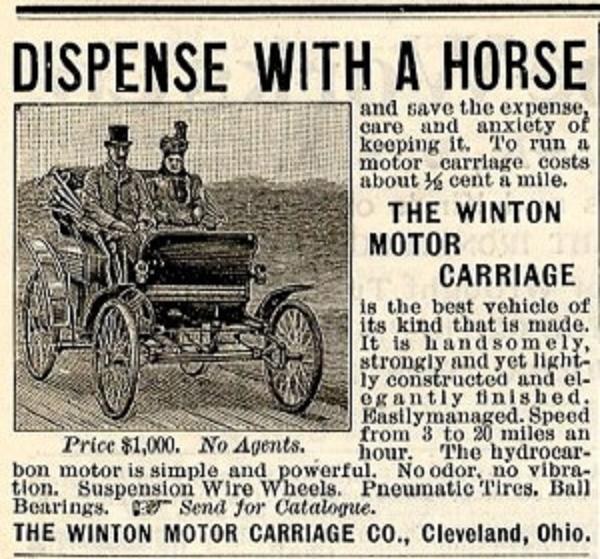
Winton Motor Carriage Company First Auto Ad

Australia: Australis

France. Steam: Montier & Gillet; electric: Krieger; internal-combustion: Grivel, Juzan, Société Parisienne, Mors; voiturette: Decauville, Richard; avant-train: Amiot

UK. Steam: Toward & Philipson; Electric: Bushbury Electric, Neale; electric phaeton: Electric Motive Power; internal-combustion: Belsize; bus: Thomas Harrington

US. Electric: Pope; Internal-combustion: Autocar, Oldsmobile, Plass, Winton

Austria-Hungary. Internal-combustion: Präsident (Tatra)

=== 1898 ===
Belgium. Internal-combustion: Delecroix, Métallurgique

France. Internal-combustion: Ailloud, Astresse, Auge, David & Bourgeois, De Dietrich, Lufbery, Poron, Tourey; voiturette: Le Blon, De Riancey; trucks and tractors: Latil; avant-train: Ponsard-Ansaloni

Germany. Electric: Kühlstein; internal-combustion: AWE, Wartburg

Italy. Internal-combustion: Ceirano GB & C; motor tricycle/quadricycle: Prinetti & Stucchi

UK. Electric: Oppermann; internal-combustion: Alldays & Onions, Grose, James and Browne, Madelvic, Star; tricar: Humber; motor tricycle/quadricycle: Arsenal, Eadie, Leuchters; motorcycle: Swift,

US. Steam: American Waltham; electric: Riker; internal-combustion: Rutenber, St. Louis; buggy: Stearns

=== 1899 ===
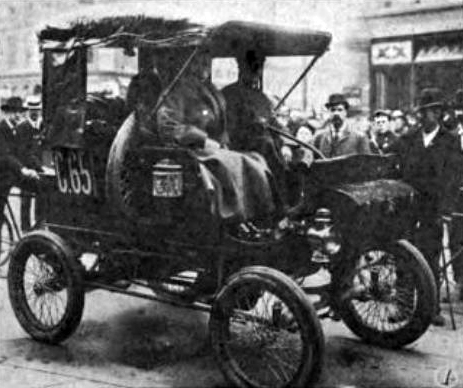
Century Steam Surrey - C. R. Woodlin and William Van Wagoner in 1901

Belgium. Voiturette: Vivinus

France. Electric: Bouquet, Garcin & Schivre, Monnard; internal-combustion: Allard-Latour, Esculape, La Lorraine, Luc Court, Marot-Gardon, Raouval, Renault (including the first saloon car), Turcat-Méry; light car: Naptholette; voiturette: Andre Py, Cochotte, Populaire, Rouxel; alcohol fuelled: L'Alkolumine

Germany. Internal-combustion: Opel

Italy. Internal-combustion: Fiat

Russia. Electric: Kukushka

UK. Electric: Joel-Rosenthal; internal-combustion: Accles-Turrell, Geering; voiturette: Argyll; motor tricycle/quadricycle: Allard, Anglo-American; motorcycle: Coventry-Eagle, OK-Supreme, Quadrant, Royal Enfield

US. Steam: Century, Grout, Kensington, Keystone, Kidder, Leach, Liquid Air, Locomobile, Mobile (pre Stanley Steamer), Strathmore, Victor Steam, Waltham Steam; electric: American Electric, Baker, Columbia (taxi), Electric Vehicle, Quinby, Stearns, US Automobile, Van Wagoner, Woods; internal-combustion: American, Black, Bramwell-Robinson, Buick, Gasmobile, Gurley, Holyoke, International, Media, Oakman-Hertel, Packard (Ohio), Quick, Sintz

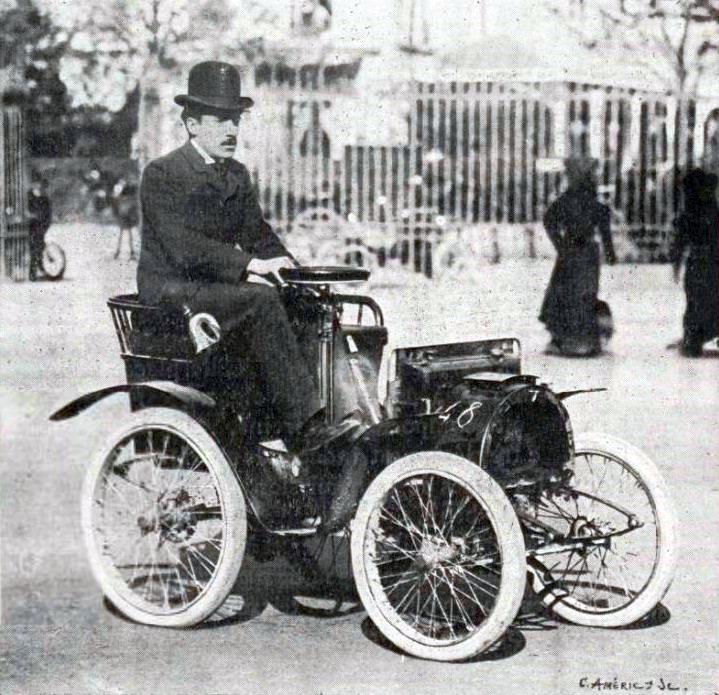
Louis Renault in 1903

=== 1900 ===
Australia. Tarrant

Belgium. Hybrid: Pieper; internal-combustion: Nagant, Pipe; voiturette: Antoine

Canada. Electric: Canadian Motor

France. Internal-combustion: Ader, Ardent, Chenard-Walcker, Maillard, Nanceene, Otto; voiturette: Chainless, Soncin; motorcycle: Buchet, Castoldi

Germany. Internal-combustion: Adler, Albion; voiturette: AGG; motorcycle (later trucks): Phänomen

Italy. Internal-combustion: Isotta Fraschini

UK. Internal-combustion: Hewinson-Bell, Napier, Smith & Dowse; voiturette: Billings-Burns; motorcycle: Rex-Acme

US. Steam: Tractobile, Kent's Pacemaker, Porter Stanhope, Skene, Steamobile; electric: Hewitt-Lindstrom, National; internal-combustion: Auburn, Canda, California, Eureka, Holley, Keystone, Knox, Lozier, Peerless, Rambler, Stearns-Knight; tractor: Samson; truck: Detroit

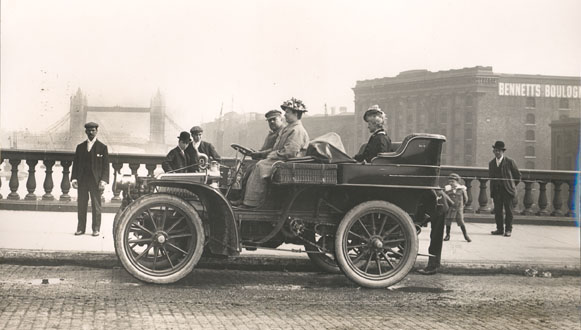
Charles J. Glidden on his 1902 world tour

=== 1901 ===
Canada. Light car: Queen

France. Internal-combustion: Charron, Corre La Licorne; voiturette: L'Ardennais, Guerraz, Henry-Dubray, Korn et Latil, Malliary; light car: De Boisse

Germany. Internal-combustion: Horch, Stoewer; motorcycle: NSU

UK. Electric: Electromobile; internal-combustion: Asquith, Imperial, John O'Gaunt, Sunbeam, paraffin fuelled: Ralph Lucas; cyclecar: Campion; light car: Ralph Gilbert; voiturette: Wolseley; motorcycle: Matchless, Singer

US. Steam: Aultman, Binney & Burnham, Covert, Desberon, Hidley, Hudson, Reading Steamer, Stearns, White; internal-combustion: Altman, Apperson, Buffalo, Buffum, De Dion, Empire, Marion, Pierce-Arrow, Schaum; touring car: Austin; runabout: Stevens-Duryea; high wheeler: Holsman; motorcycle: Indian

=== 1902 ===
Belgium. Internal-combustion: Minerva

France. Internal-combustion: Motobloc, Richard-Brasier

Germany. Internal-combustion: Aachener, AEG, Argus, Beaufort, NAG; motorised tricycle/quadricycle: Cyklon

Russia. Electric: Dux

Spain. Internal-combustion: Anglada

UK. Steam: Vapomobile; internal-combustion: Abingdon, Armstrong, Karminski, Maudslay, Rover, Vulcan; voiturette: Esculapeus, tricar: Advance; motorcycle: Norton, Triumph

US. Steam: Clipper, Hoffman, Richmond, Stanley; electric: Studebaker; internal-combustion: Blood, Brennan, Cadillac, Cameron, Cannon, Clarkmobile, Franklin (automobile), Gaeth, Hammer-Sommer, Kirk, Marmon, Reber; runabout: Glide (automobile), Smith, Standard Steel; touring car: Spaulding; light car: Greenleaf, Orient; buggy: American, Union; compound expansion: Eisenhuth; truck: Rapid

=== 1903 ===
Belgium. Internal-combustion: Excelsior

France. Internal-combustion: Ariès, Clément-Bayard, Delaunay-Belleville, Hotchkiss, Regal, Talbot; light car: Henry Bauchet

Germany. Internal-combustion bus/truck: Büssing

UK. Electric: Lems; steam (and internal-combustion): Albany; internal-combustion: Attila, Elswick, Kyma, Lea-Francis, Lee Stroyer, Standard, Vauxhall, Whitlock; avant-train: Adams; motorcycle: Chater-Lea, New Hudson, Wilkinson Sword

US. Steam: Jaxon; internal-combustion: American Chocolate (Walter), Bates, Ford, Lenawee, Marble-Swift, Matheson, Vermont, Wilson; motorcycles: Harley-Davidson, touring car: Acme, Berg, Logan, Michigan, Iroquois, Jackson, Phelps, Premier; roadster: Buckmobile; runabout: Dingfelder, Eldredge, Marr, Mitchell, Overland, Sandusky, Tincher

=== 1904 ===
Canada. Internal-combustion: Russell

France. Internal-combustion: Cottin & Desgouttes, Grégoire; voiturette: Lavie; motor tricycle: La Va Bon Train

Germany. Internal-combustion: Alliance, Wenkelmobil

Italy. Internal-combustion: Itala

Spain. Internal-combustion: Hispano-Suiza

UK. Electric: Imperial; internal-combustion: Arbee, Armstrong Whitworth, Ascot, Calthorpe, Chambers, Crossley, Croxted, Iden, Motor Carrier, Queen; voiturette: Achilles; light car: Gilburt; tricar: Garrard; motorcycle: Phelon & Moore, Zenith

US. Steam: Empire Steamer; electric: Berwick, Marquette; internal-combustion: American, American Mercedes, American Napier, Christie, Cleveland, Corbin, Detroit Wheeler, Dolson, Lambert, Luverne, Maxwell, Moline, Orlo, Oscar Lear, Pierce-Racine, Queen, Sampson, Schacht, Sinclair-Scott (Maryland), Standard, Studebaker-Garford, Twyford Stanhope; touring car: Brew-Hatcher, S&M Simplex, Crestmobile, Detroit Auto, Frayer-Miller, Jeffery, Pungs Finch, Richmond, Royal, Thomas, Upton; runabout: Courier, Fredonia, Northern, Pierce, Pope-Tribune; tractor: Holt

== Brass era ==
=== 1905 ===
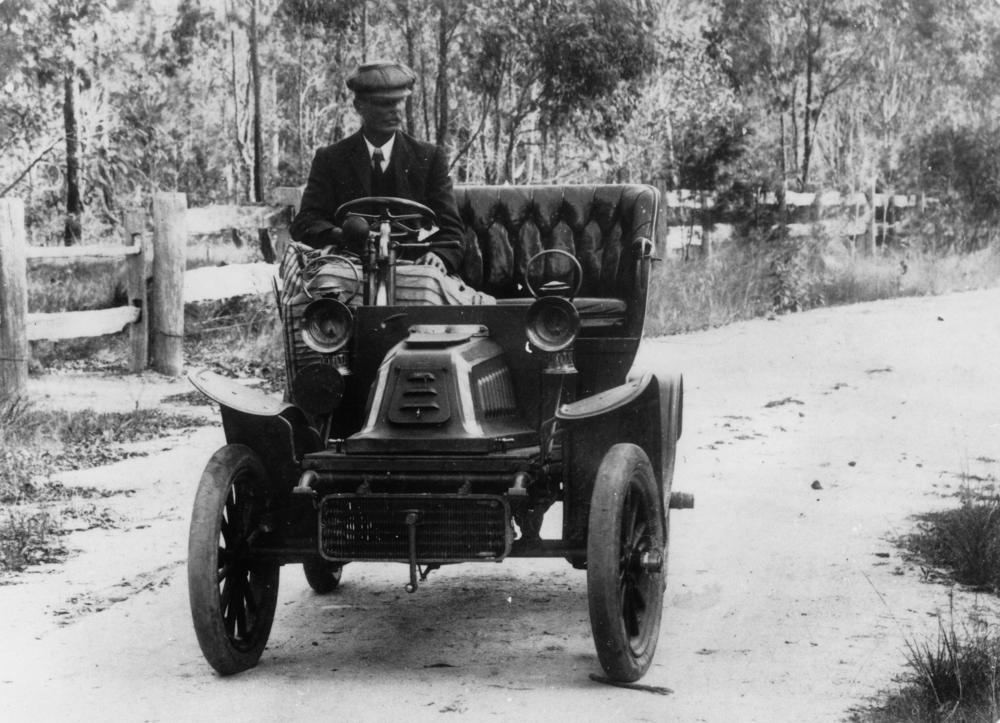
A De Dion-Bouton in 1905

France. Internal-combustion: Alliance, Brasier, Charlon, Couverchel, Delage, Eudelin, Rolland-Pilain, Sizaire-Naudin; touring car: Rebour; light car: Helbé, Urric; voiturette: Eureka; motorcycle: Herdtle & Bruneau

Germany. Steam: Altmann; internal-combustion: Ehrhardt, Hansa, Hexe, Solidor

Italy. Internal-combustion: Diatto, Zust

UK. Electric: Alexandra, Ekstromer; internal-combustion: Adams, Austin, Edismith, Riley, Sunbeam-Talbot, Talbot; light car: One of the Best; tricar: Anglian; motorcycle: Velocette

US. Electric: Rauch and Lang; internal-combustion: Aerocar, Ardsley, Ariel, Cartercar, Corwin, Crown, Harrison, Haynes, Silent Knight, Pullman, Rainier, Selden, Soules, Stoddard-Dayton; touring car: Detroit-Oxford, Diamond T, Gas-au-lec, Lambert, REO, USA Daimler; roadster: Walker, Western; light car: Bell, buggy: Deal, Hammer; motorcycle: Excelsior-Henderson, Shawmobile

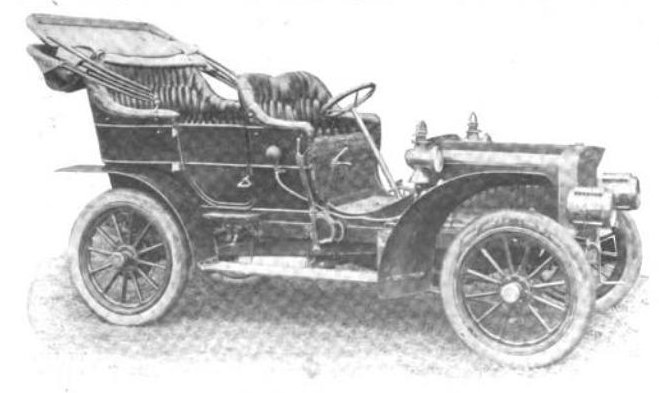
1906 American Simplex touring car

=== 1906 ===
Belgium. Internal-combustion: Impéria; hybrid: Auto-Mixte

France. Internal-combustion: AM, Ampère, Antoinette, Lion-Peugeot, Unic; light car: Doriot, Flandrin & Parant; voiturette and motorcycle: Alcyon

Germany. Internal-combustion: AAG

Italy. Internal-combustion: Aquila Italiana, Fial, Peugeot-Croizat, SCAT, SPA, Standard

UK. Internal-combustion: All-British, Ladas, Marlborough, Rolls-Royce; light car: Jowett; tricar: Addison, Armadale; dual-control car: Academy; hybrid bus: Tilling-Stevens; motorcycle: Dot

US. Steam: Doble, Ross; electric: Babcock; internal-combustion: ALCO, American, American Simplex, Apollo, Atlas, Bliss, Car de Luxe, Deere, Dorris, Dragon, Frontenac, Hol-Tan, Jewell, Kissel, Model, Moore (Ball-Bearing Car); touring car: Heine-Velox, Moon; roadster: Colburn; light car: Janney; high wheeler: ABC, Black, McIntyre, Success

=== 1907 ===
Australia. Caldwell Vale

Belgium. Internal-combustion: Springuel

Canada. Internal-combustion: McLaughlin

France. Internal-combustion: Ariane, Jean-Bart, Lahaussois, Lutier, Marie de Bagneux, Prod'homme, Sinpar, Sixcyl; voiturette: Couteret, Obus, La Radieuse; voiturette tricar: Guerry et Bourguignon, Lurquin-Coudert; tricar: Austral, Mototri Contal; hybrid: AL; amphibious: Ravailler; racing car: De Bazelaire

UK. Internal-combustion: Dalgliesh-Gullane, Hillman; truck: Commer; motorcycle: Douglas

US. Electric: American Juvenile Electric, Detroit Electric; internal-combustion: Allen Kingston, Anderson, Carter Twin-Engine, Continental, Corbitt, Fuller, Griswold, Maryland, Kiblinger, Oakland, Regal, Speedwell; high wheeler: Eureka, Hatfield, Single Center, Staver; roadster: CVI; runabout: Albany, Colt Runabout, Kermath, Marvel, Nielson

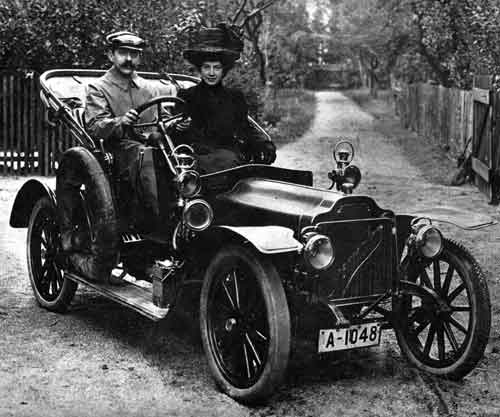
Brennabor Typ A1, 1908

=== 1908 ===
France. Internal-combustion: Le Pratic, X; phaeton: Siscart; voiturette: Roussel

Germany. Internal-combustion: Allright, Brennabor, Fafnir, Lloyd

Italy. Internal-combustion: Lancia, Marca-Tre-Spade, Temperino

Russia. Internal-combustion: Russo-Balt

UK. Internal-combustion: Arno, Sheffield-Simplex, Valveless; touring car: Argon; light car: Alex; motorcycle: Premier

US. Internal-combustion: Bendix, Coates-Goshen, Correja, Cunningham, De Luxe, General Motors, Gyroscope, Havers, Imperial, Paige, Sears, Velie; touring car: Moyer; high wheeler: Cole, De Schaum, DeWitt, Hobbie Accessible, Michigan; runabout: Simplo; cyclecar: Browniekar; buggy: Davis

=== 1909 ===
France. Internal-combustion: Bugatti, FL, La Ponette, Le Zèbre

Italy. Racing car: Brixia-Zust; motorcycle: Della Ferrera

Netherlands. Internal-combustion: Entrop

UK. Internal-combustion: Pilot

US. Internal-combustion: Abbott-Detroit, Anhut, Black Crow, Crow-Elkhart, Cutting, EMF, Everitt, Fuller, GJG, Hupmobile, Inter-State, Lion, Pilot; touring car: Crawford, Fal-Car, Piggins, Standard Six; roadster: Coyote, Hudson, Kauffman; runabout: Brush; small car: Herreshoff, Hitchcock, KRIT; light car: Courier; buggy: Paterson; raceabout: Mercer; racing car: McFarlan; truck: Chase, Sanford-Herbert

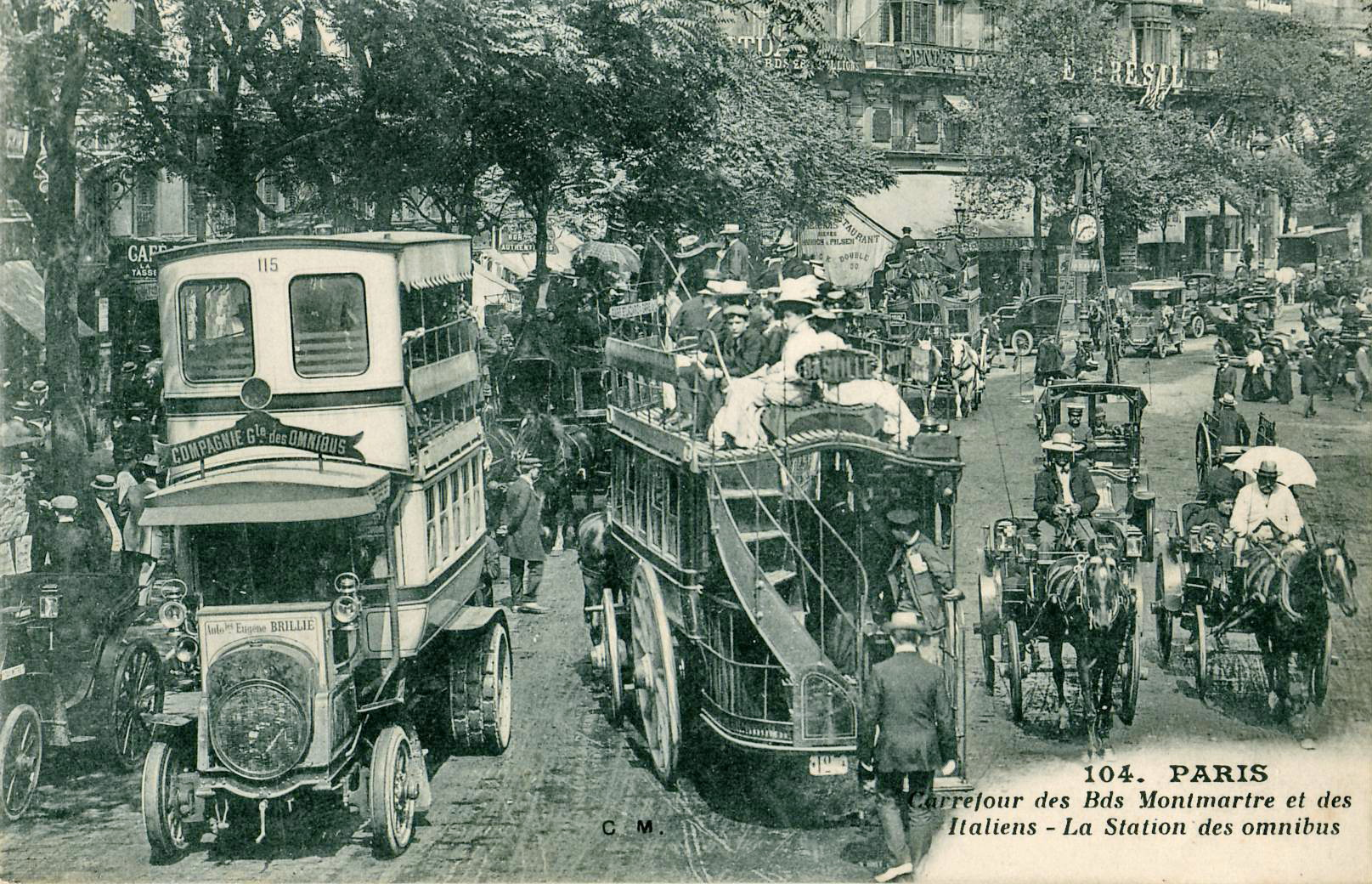
Brillié-Schneider Autobus running for the Compagnie Générale des Omnibus, Paris

=== 1910 ===
Canada. Internal-combustion: Gareau

France. Internal-combustion: Ageron, Damaizin & Pujos, Margaria, Mathis, Plasson; light car: Simplicia; cyclecar: Bédélia

Germany. Internal-combustion: Ansbach, Apollo, Audi

Italy. Internal-combustion: Alfa Romeo, Chiribiri

UK. Steam: AMC; internal-combustion: Morgan, Siddeley-Deasy; cyclecar: GN

US. Electric: Grinnell; internal-combustion: Alpena, Cavac, De Mot, Flanders, Great Eagle, Kline Kar, Lexington, Maytag-Mason, Parry, Spaulding, United States; touring car: Carhartt, Chalmers, Detroit-Dearborn, Etnyre, Faulkner-Blanchard, Great Southern; tonneau: Henry, Midland; roadster: Ames, King-Remick, Penn; runabout: Empire; cyclecar: Autoette; high wheeler: Anchor Buggy; buggy: Aldo

=== 1911 ===
Argentina. Anasagasti

Canada. Internal-combustion: Clinton

France. Cyclecar: Enders

Germany. Internal-combustion: Excelsior-Mascot, Podeus; rotary valve: Standard

Italy. Motorcycle: Benelli

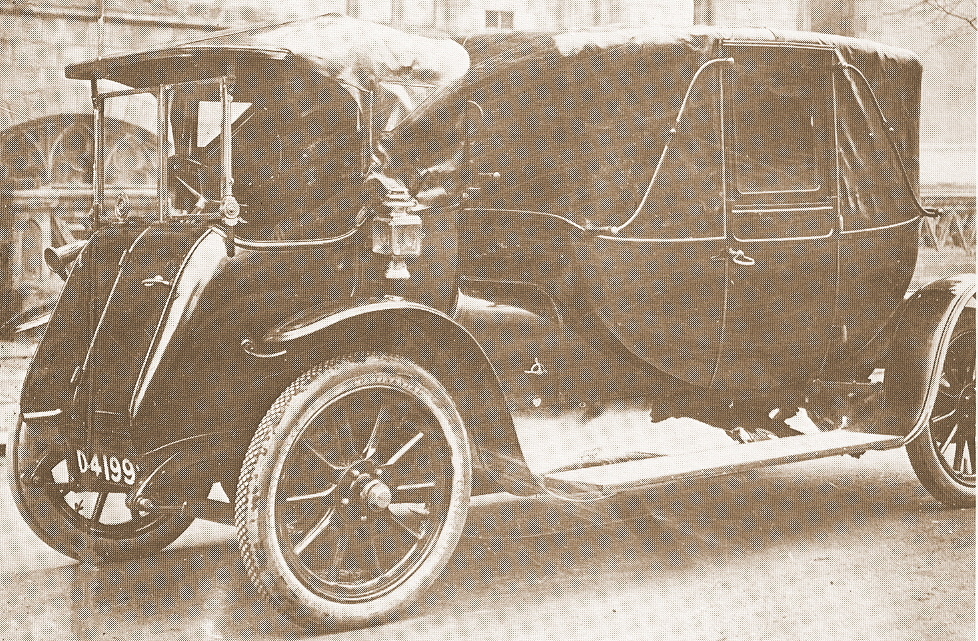
1912 Aberdonia Landau

UK. Internal-combustion: Aberdonia, AGR, Airedale, GWK, Newton-Bennett, Roper-Corbet; cyclecar: Alvechurch, Autotrix, Lambert; motorcycle: Beardmore, Coventry-Victor, Levis, Rudge-Whitworth, Villiers

US. Electric: Hupp-Yeats, Century, Dayton Electric; internal-combustion: America, Ann Arbor, Chevrolet, Day, Gaylord, American Jonz (automobile) (The American), King, Komet, Marathon, Overland OctoAuto, Nyberg, Pilgrim of Providence, Rayfield, Stutz, Virginian, Willys; tractor: Mogul; fire-engine: Ahrens-Fox,

=== 1912 ===
Argentina: Internal-combustion: Anasagasti

Canada. Internal-combustion: Amherst

France. Electric: Anderson Electric, internal-combustion: Albatros, Alda, Arista, Cognet de Seynes, Hédéa, La Roulette, SCAP; light car: Luxior, truck: Laffly, avant-train: Ponts,

Hungary. Internal-combustion: Raba

Italy. Internal-combustion: Storero

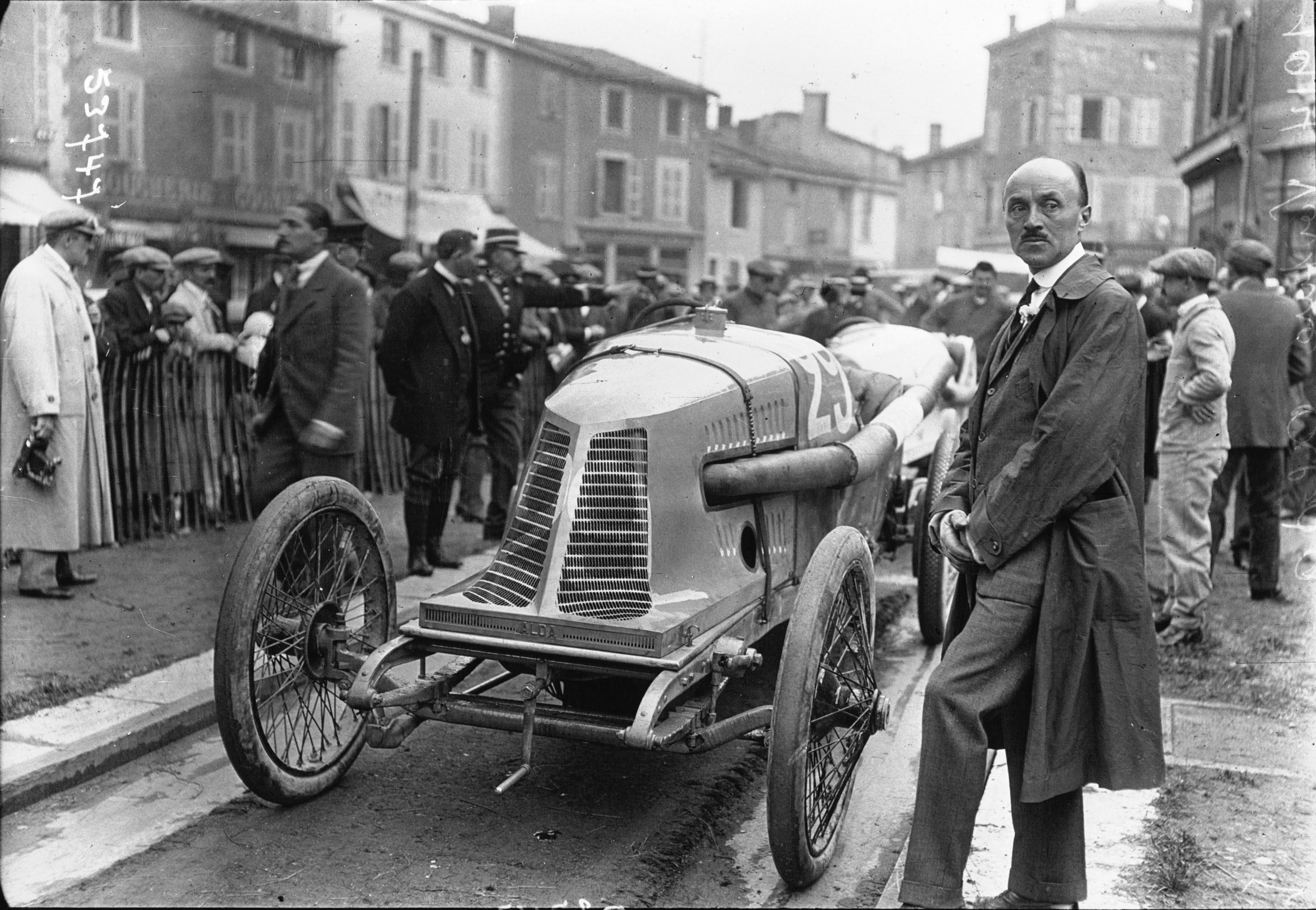
Fernand Charron on an Alda at 1914 French Grand Prix

Spain. Internal-combustion: Abadal

UK. Steam: Sheppee; internal-combustion: ABC; cyclecar: Adamson, Arden, Chota, Coventry Premier, Crouch, Hampton, HCE, Tiny, Tyseley; motorcycle: NUT, Sunbeam

US. Electric: Argo Electric, Buffalo Electric, Church-Field; internal-combustion: Anna, Briggs-Detroiter, Crane & Breed, Pathfinder, Standard; touring car: Miller, Westcott; light-car: Lad's Car, Little; tricar: American Tri-Car, motorcycle: Cyclone; truck: Brockway, Palmer-Moore

=== 1913 ===
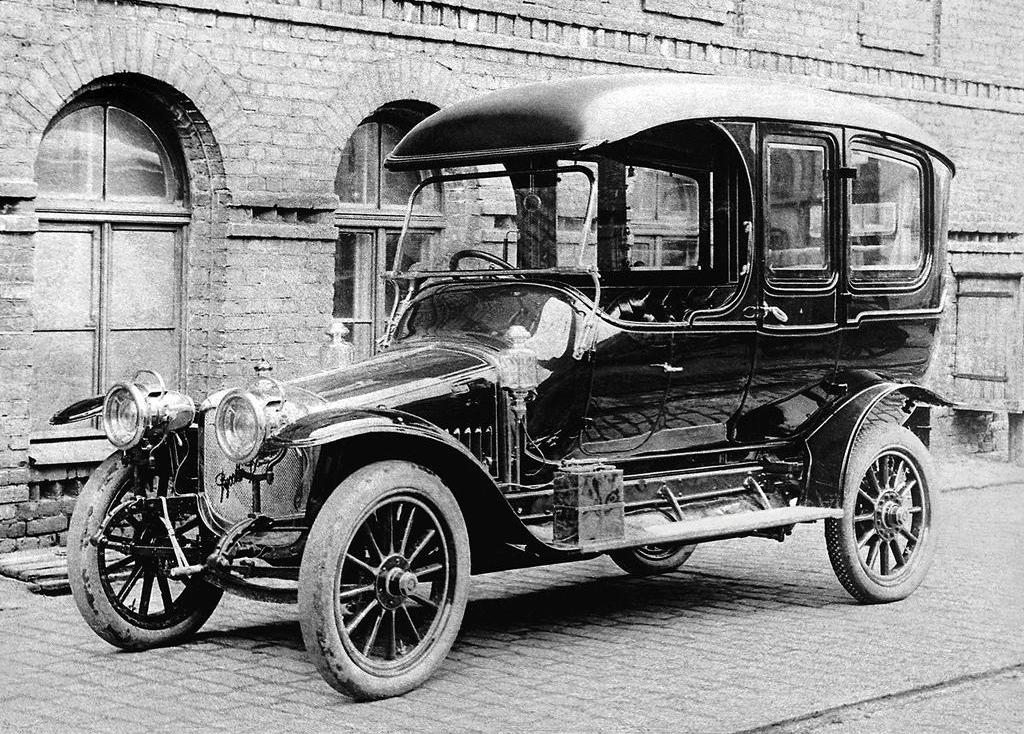
1913 Russo-Balt S-24/40

Belgium. Internal-combustion: Alatac

France. Internal-combustion: Ajax, Alba, Alva, Rougier; cyclecar: Jouvie

Spain. Cyclecar: David

UK. Internal-combustion: Morris, Perry, Woodrow, WW; light car: Ace, Lucar; cyclecar: Armstrong, Athmac, Baker & Dale, Bantam, BPD, Britannia, Broadway, Carlette, Dallison, Dewcar, LAD, Lester Solus, Vee Gee, Warne, Wilbrook, Wrigley; motocycle: Montgomery

US. Electric: American Electric; internal-combustion: Allen (Ohio), Allen (Philadelphia), Chandler, Flyer, Grant, Lyons-Knight, Monarch; cyclecar: Car-Nation, Coey, Detroit Cyclecar, Downing-Detroit, Dudly Bug, Gadabout, JPL, Little Detroit Speedster, Little Princess, Twombly; touring car: Keeton; roadster: Saxon, Scripps-Booth; sports car: Duesenberg; motocycle: Bi-Autogo

=== 1914 ===
France. Internal-combustion: Ascot, Donnet-Zedel; light car: Nardini

Japan. Internal-combustion: DAT

Italy. Maserati

UK. Internal-combustion: Trojan, Utopian; light car: Bifort, cyclecar: Bradwell, Buckingham, Carden, Hill & Stanier, Imperial, Projecta, Simplic; motocycle: ABC

US. Electric: Ward; internal-combustion: Ajax, American, Benham, Dile, Keystone, Light, Monroe, MPM, Partin, Willys-Knight; touring car: Alter; roadster: Metz, Vulcan; light car: Fischer, Lincoln; cyclecar: Argo, Arrow, Biesel, CAC, Cricket, Davis, Dodge, Engler, Excel, Hawk, Logan, LuLu, Malcolm Jones, Mercury, Motor Bob, O-We-Go, Xenia

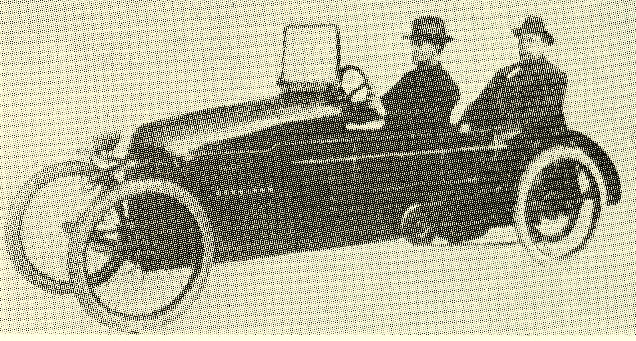
1914 Xenia

=== 1915 ===
Canada. Internal-combustion: Gray-Dort, Regal

UK. Internal-combustion: Atalanta; sports car: Aston Martin

US. Electric: Menominee, hybrid electric: Owen Magnetic, internal-combustion: All-Steel, Apple, Biddle, Bour-Davis, Briscoe, Dort, Elcar, Herff-Brooks, Hollier, Ross, Smith Flyer, light car: Bell, Harvard, cyclecar: Koppin, racing car: Frontenac,

=== 1916 ===
Russia: AMO

US. Electric: Belmont; internal-combustion: Aland, American Junior, Auto Red Bug, Bush, Daniels, Dixie Flyer, Hackett, HAL, Jordan, Liberty, Sun, Yale; touring car: Barley, Marion-Handley,

Germany: BMW

=== 1917 ===
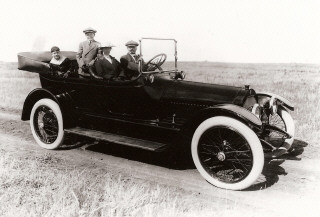
The Moose Jaw Standard

Canada. Internal-combustion: Moose Jaw Standard

UK. Cyclecar: Gibbons

US. Internal-combustion: Able, Amalgamated, American, Anderson, Columbia, Commonwealth, Piedmont, Shad-Wyck, Templar; touring car: Harroun, Nelson, Olympian; light car: Gem; truck: Nash,

=== 1918 ===
Italy: trucks OM

UK. Internal-combustion: All British Ford; motorcycle: Cotton

US. Steam: Bryan, internal-combustion: Essex; motorcycle: Ner-a-Car

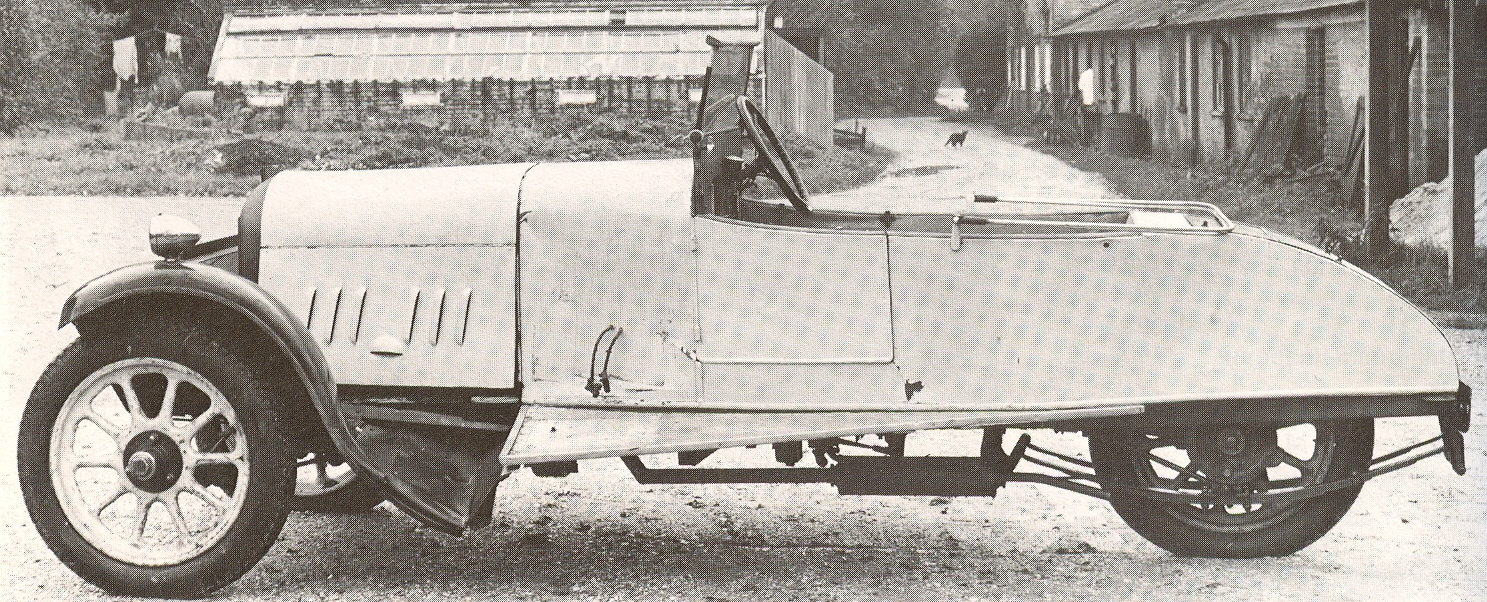
1922 Castle Three

=== 1919 ===
Australia: Australian Six

France. Internal-combustion: Avions Voisin, Butterosi, Citroen, Leyat, Salmson; cyclecar: ASS, Soriano-Pedroso

Germany. Internal-combustion: AGA, Anker

UK. Internal-combustion: Alvis, Angus-Sanderson, Armstrong Siddeley, Ashton-Evans, Bentley, Dawson, Eric-Campbell, Maiflower, Ruston-Hornsby, Willys Overland Crossley; cyclecar: Aero Car, Ashby, AV, Castle Three, Economic, Tamplin; motorcycle: Brough Superior, Coventry-Victor, Dunelt, Duzmo

US. Internal-combustion: Amco, Argonne, Climber, Du Pont, Graham-Paige; truck: Huffman

== Vintage era ==
=== 1920 ===
Belgium. Light car: ALP

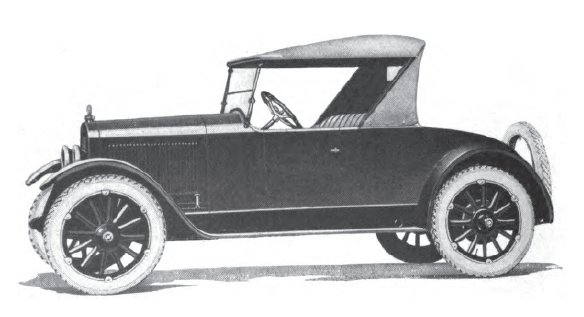
1922 Gardner Roadster

France. Electric: Electricar; internal-combustion: Janémian, Jouffret, Radior; cyclecar: Able, Ajams, Astatic, La Comfortable, De Marçay, Elfe, Kevah, Santax; sports car: Fonlupt

Germany. Internal-combustion: Joswin, Selve; touring car: Steiger

Japan: Mazda

UK. Internal-combustion: Aeroford, Cubitt, Galloway, Palmerston, Payze; light car: Albert; cyclecar: Allwyn, Archer, Baughan, Bell, Black Prince, Blériot-Whippet, Bound, Cambro, CFB, Winson; sports car: Sports Junior

USA: Ace, Alsace, Aluminum, Astra, Binghamton Electric, Carroll, Colonial, Colonial/Shaw, Friend, Gardner, Gray Light Car, LaFayette, Lorraine, Mason Truck, Sheridan, Standard Steam Car, Stanwood

=== 1921 ===
Canada: Brock Six, London Six

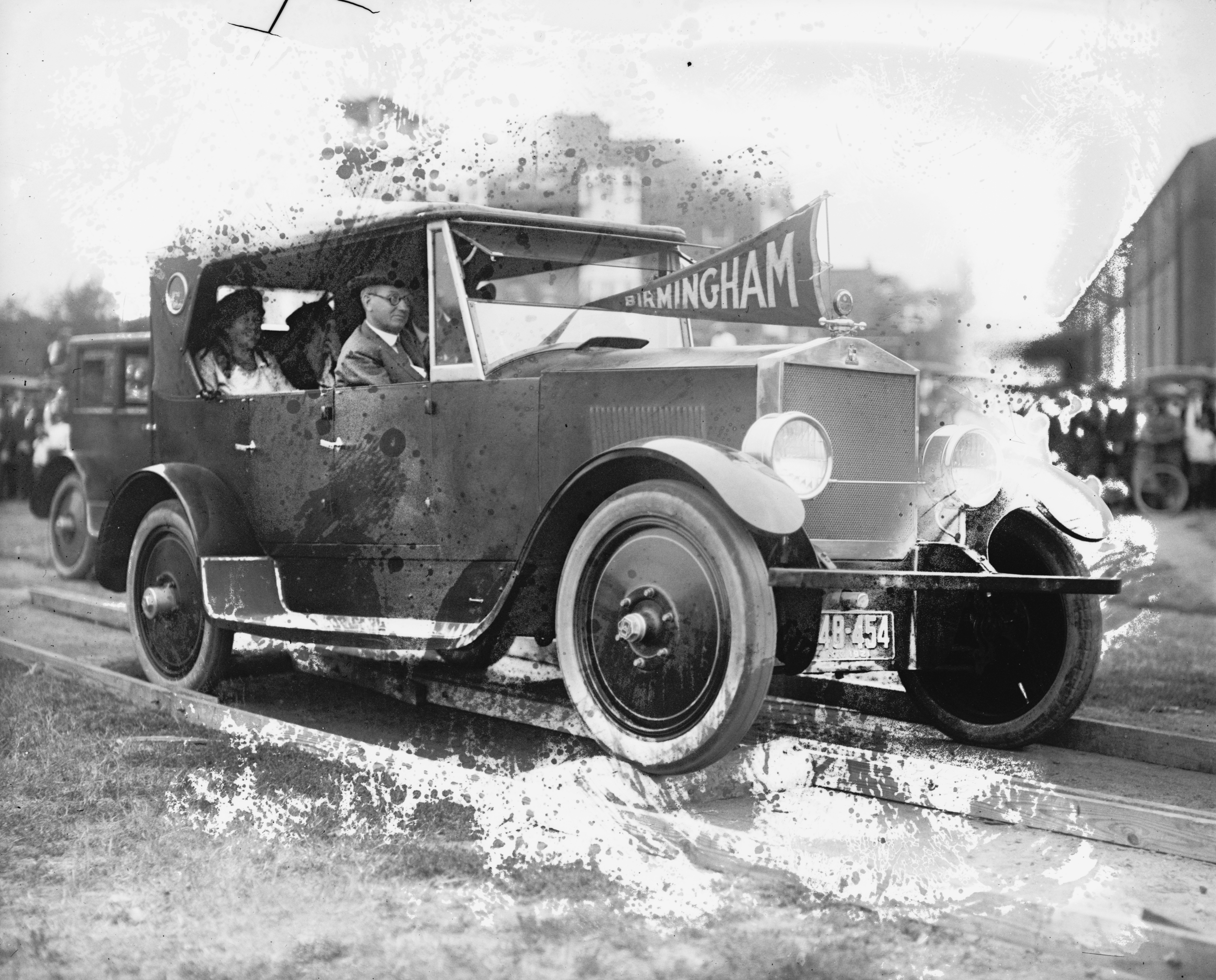
Birmingham Motors demonstration in 1921

France: Amilcar, Ballot, Bernardet, Coadou et Fleury, Colda, Le Favori, Georges Irat, Hinstin, Janoir, Madoz, Quo Vadis, Le Roitelet, Solanet

Germany: Alfi, Arimofa, Atlantic, Pawi, Rumpler Tropfenwagen, Zündapp

Italy: Ansaldo, Aurea, IENA, motorcycle: Moto Guzzi

Japan: Ales

UK: Amazon, Barnard, Scott Sociable, Skeoch

US. Steam: Coats, Davis, internal combustion: Adria, Aero Car, Ajax, Automatic, Birmingham, Colonial, Davis Totem, Durant, Earl, Handley-Knight, Jacquet Flyer, Kessler, Wills Sainte Claire

=== 1922 ===
Canada: Colonial

France: Astra, Bucciali, Induco, JG, Vaillant

Germany: Juho, Komet

UK: Abbey, Abingdon, Albatros, Alberford, Aster, Atomette, Autogear, Baby Blake, Bean, Bow-V-Car, Christchurch-Campbell, Clyno, Frazer Nash, Gwynne, Packman & Poppe, Swallow Sidecar Company, Wigan-Barlow, Xtra

US. Steam: Alena, American Steamer, Endurance, internal combustion: ABC, Anahuac, Ansted-Lexington, Checker, DAC, Dagmar, Detroit, Gray, Jewett, Kess-Line 8, Rickenbacker, Star, Stewart-Coats

=== 1923 ===
Belgium: ADK, De Wandre, Juwel

Canada. Steam: Brooks

France: Bell, Henou, Willème

Germany: Alan, Kenter, Pilot, motorcycle: BMW

UK: Astral, Urecar

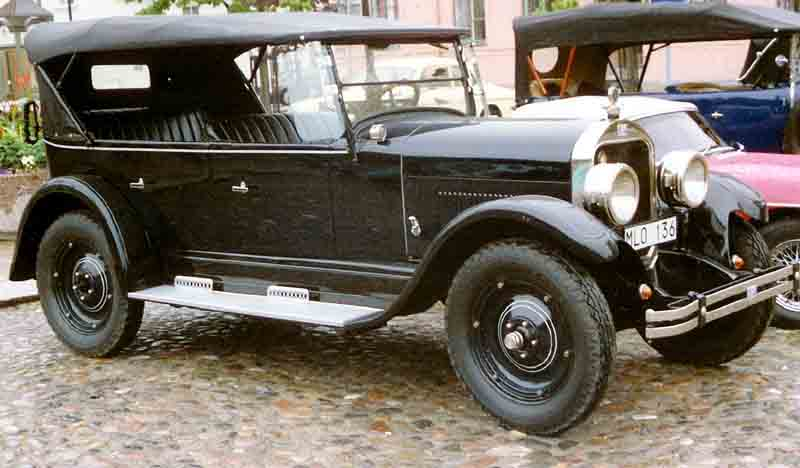
1925 Flint B-40 Touring

USA: Flint, Kenworth, Rugby

=== 1924 ===
Czech Republic: Skoda

France: AEM, AS, Le Cabri, De Sanzy, Elgé, Jean Gras, Jousset

Germany: Amor, Ehrhardt-Szawe, Tempo

Japan: Otomo

UK: HRD, Morris, Paydell

US. Steam: American; internal-combustion: Chrysler, Junior R, Pennant

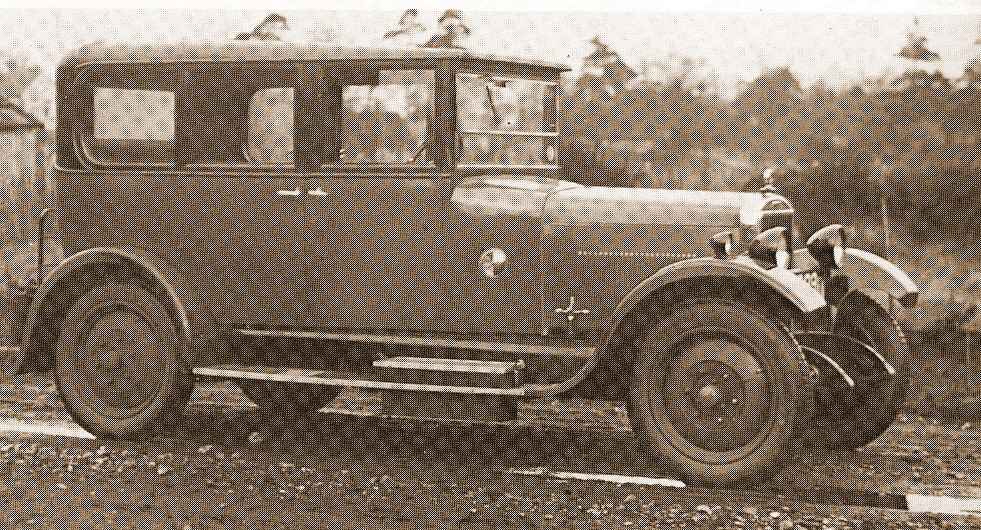
1927 Brocklebank Six

=== 1925 ===
Argentina: Hispano-Argentina

Australia: Ford (Australia)

Belgium: Jeecy-Vea

France: Heinis, Jack Sport

Germany: Hanomag, Sablatnig-Beuchelt, Seidel-Arop

Italy: Amilcar Italiana, Maggiora, Moretti

UK: Brocklebank, Invicta, Jappic, McEvoy, MG

USA: Empire Steam Car, Ajax, Diana

=== 1926 ===
France: Alma, Arzac, Chaigneau-Brasier, Constantinesco, Lambert, Ratier, SAFAF, Sensaud de Lavaud, Tracta

Germany: Daimler-Benz, Gutbrod, Mercedes-Benz

UK: Arab, HP, Marendaz, Swallow

USA: Ansted, Divco, Dodgeson, Pontiac

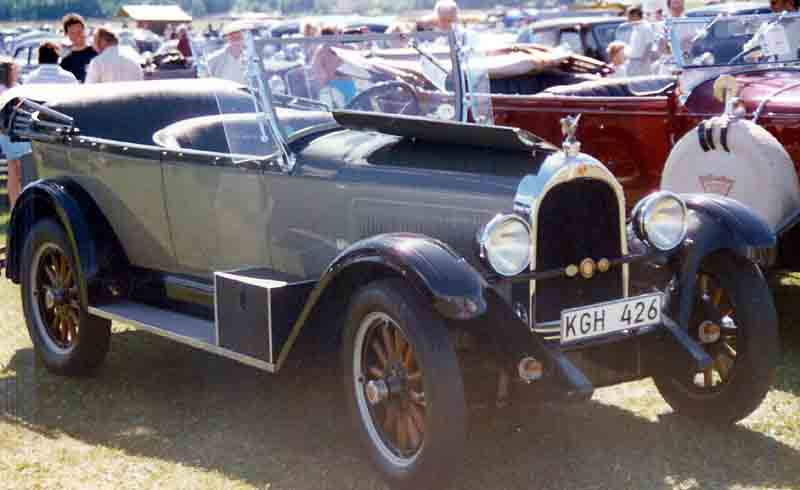
1927 Falcon-Knight Model 10 Touring

=== 1927 ===
France: Rosengart, Silva-Coroner

UK: Arrol-Aster, Avro, Streamline (Burney Car)

USA: Falcon-Knight, Graham-Paige, LaSalle

Sweden: Volvo

=== 1928 ===
Germany: BMW, DKW

Netherlands: DAF

UK: Ascot, Vincent

USA: DeSoto, Plymouth

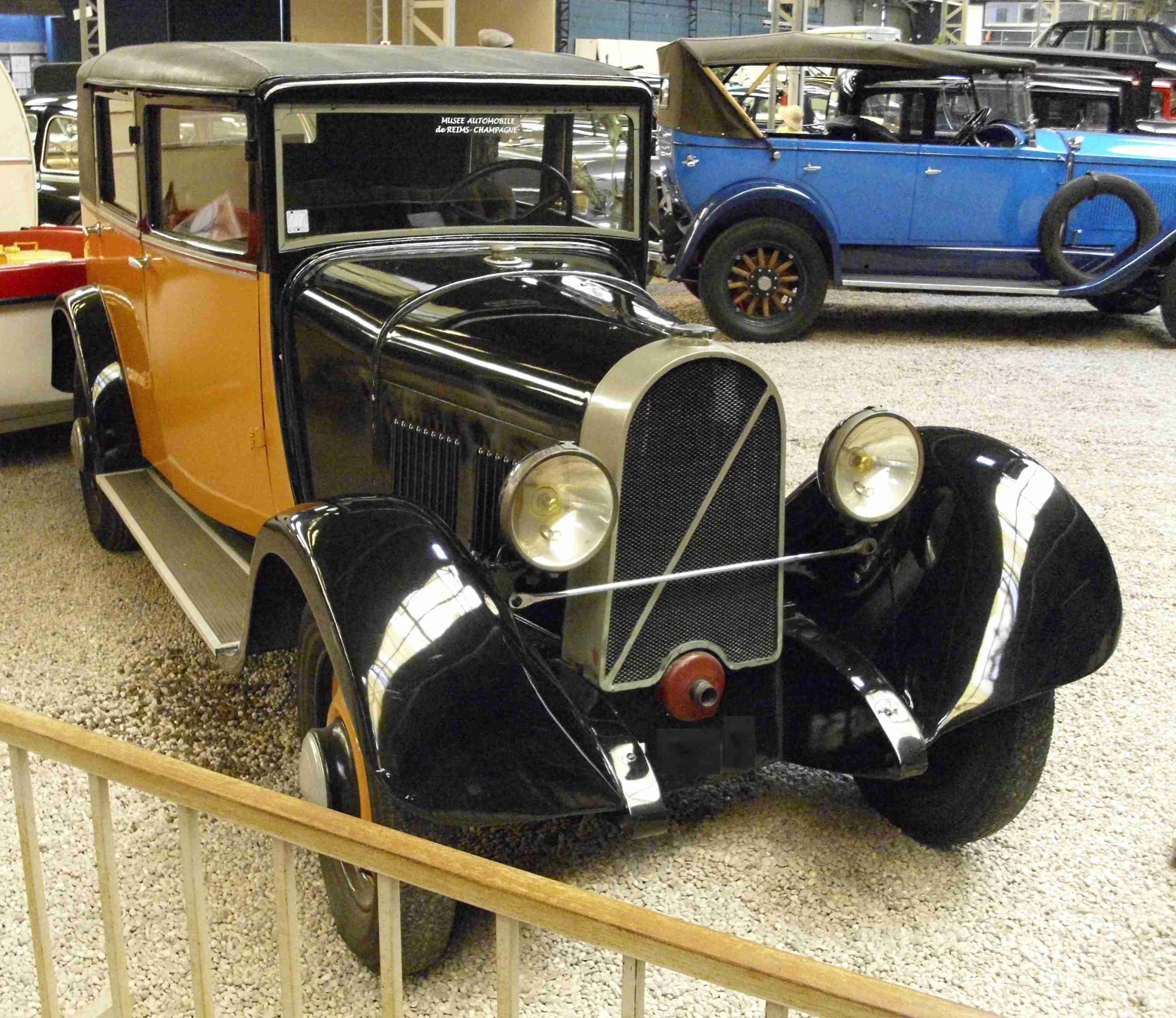
1930 Michel Irat

=== 1929 ===
France: Alphi, Michel Irat

Germany: Borgward

Italy: Ferrari

Soviet Union. Motorcycle: Izh

Spain: National Pescara

UK: Alta

USA: American Austin, Blackhawk, Cord, Roosevelt, Ruxton, Viking, Windsor

== Pre-war years ==
=== 1930 ===
Belgium: Astra

France: AER, Virus

Germany: Ardie-Ganz

Soviet Union: KIM

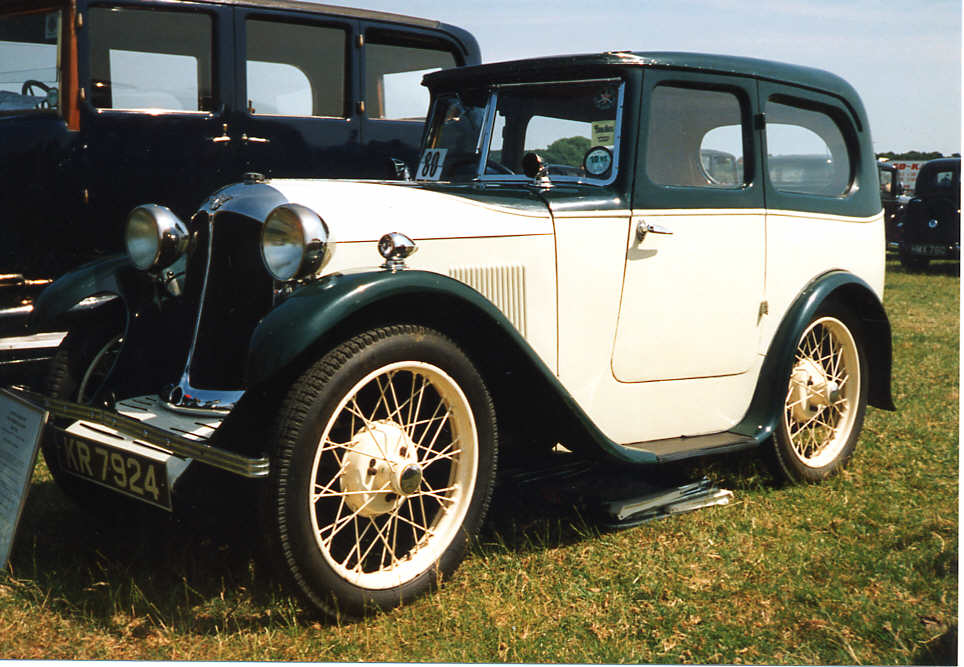
1931 Austin 7 Swallow saloon

=== 1931 ===
Australia: Southern Cross

Germany: Maikäfer

Soviet Union: ZIS

Japan: Datsun

UK: Squire

USA: De Vaux, Hoffman (Detroit automobile)

=== 1932 ===
Italy: Ermini, Nardi

Poland: Polski Fiat

Soviet Union: GAZ

UK: Vale Special

USA: Allied, De Vaux Continental, Jaeger

=== 1933 ===
France: Tracford

Germany: Standard Superior

UK: André, Railton, SS Cars (predecessor of Jaguar Cars)

USA: Continental

=== 1934 ===
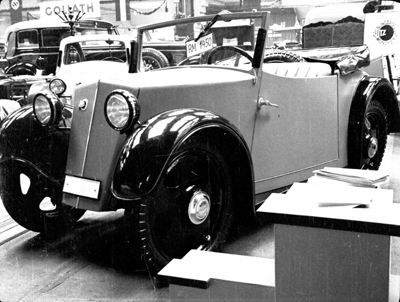
1934 Bungartz Burtz

France: Simca

Germany: Auto Union, Bungartz Butz

Japan: Ohta Jidosha

UK: Aveling-Barford, British Salmson, Rytecraft

=== 1935 ===
France: Talbot-Lago

Germany: Henschel

UK: Autovia, Batten, Jensen, Reliant

USA: Stout Scarab

=== 1936 ===
France: Darl'mat, Monocar

UK: Allard, HRG, Lammas, Lloyd, Skirrow

Japan: Toyota

=== 1937 ===
France: Ardex, Danvignes

Germany: Volkswagen

UK: Atalanta

=== 1938 ===
France: DB, Rolux

UK: Nuffield

== War years ==
=== 1939 ===
Soviet Union: SMZ

USA: Albatross, Crosley, truck: Peterbilt

Italy: Ferrari

=== 1940 ===
UK: DMW

=== 1941 ===
Soviet Union: UAZ; motorcycle: IMZ-Ural

=== 1942 ===
Brazil. Trucks: F.N.M.

=== 1943 ===
Soviet Union. Trucks: Ural

=== 1945 ===
India: Mahindra & Mohammed (Later Mahindra & Mahindra)

Soviet Union. Motorcycle: Dnipro

UK: Bristol, Healey, Jaguar Cars

USA: Kaiser-Frazer

== Post-war years ==
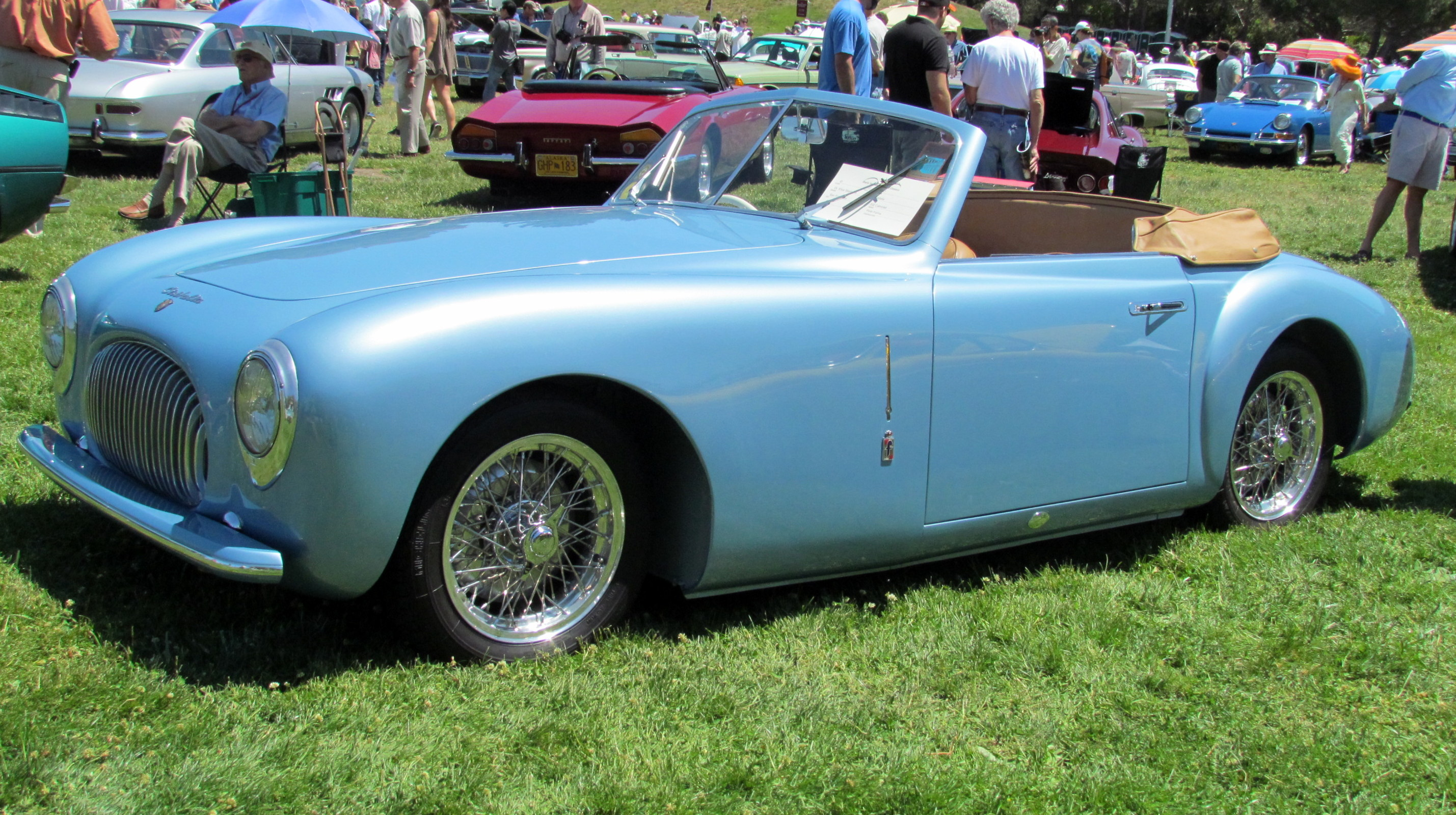
1947 Cisitalia 202 Cabriolet

=== 1946 ===
France: Chappe et Gessalin, Mochet, Rovin

Germany: Messerschmitt

Hungary: Csepel

Italy: Bandini, Cisitalia, Stanguellini; Trucks: Astra Veicoli Industriali

Soviet Union: Moskvitch; motorcycle: ZiD

Spain: Pegaso

UK: Cooper

USA: American Motors Incorporated, Frazer

=== 1947 ===
Canada: Studebaker

France: Aerocarene, Alamagny

Germany: Veritas

Italy: Innocenti, Lambretta, Maserati, O.S.C.A.

Soviet Union. Trucks: Minsk Automobile Plant

UK: Ambassador, Ausfod, Buckler

USA: Airscoot, Davis, Playboy

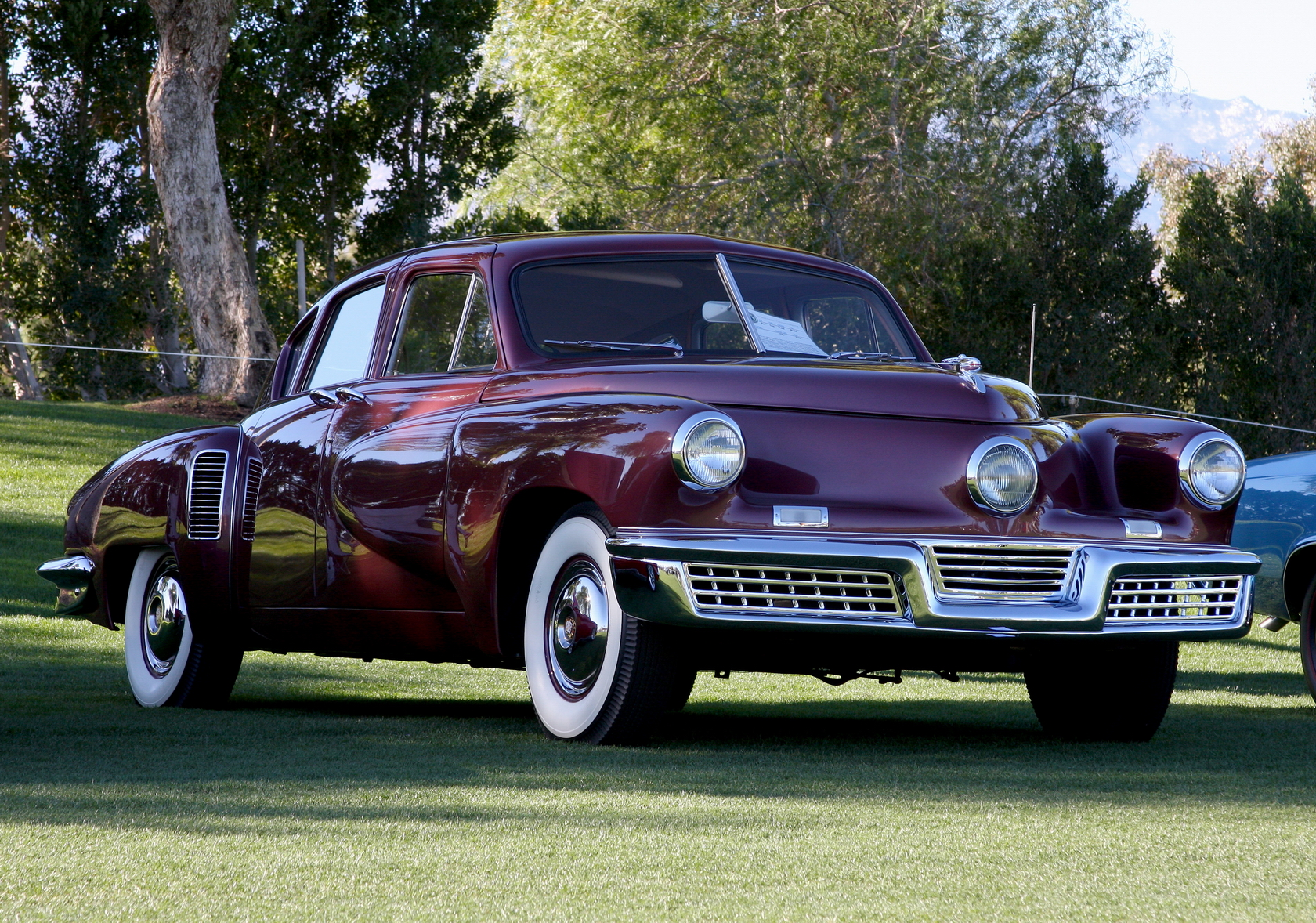
1948 Tucker Torpedo

=== 1948 ===
Australia: Holden

China: GAC

France: J-P Wimille

Germany: Fend Flitzer

Italy: Fimer, Iso Rivolta, Siata

Japan. Motorcycle: Marusho

Soviet Union. Trucks: BelAZ

UK: EMC, Land Rover, Rochdale, Thundersley Invacar

USA: Autoette, Keller, Tucker Sedan

=== 1949 ===
Australia: Hartnett

France: Atlas

India: AUTOPRD

Soviet Union: RAF

Japan: Honda (Motorcycle)

UK: Dellow

USA: Aerocar, Airway, Glasspar G2; scooter: PMC

=== 1950 ===
France: Autobleu

Germany: Fuldamobil, Kersting-Modellbauwerkstätten, Kleinschnittger, Staunau

Spain: SEAT

UK: Marauder, Paramount

USA: Muntz

=== 1951 ===
Argentina: IAME

Australia: Chrysler (Australia)

France: Atlas, Automobiles Marathon, Le Piaf, Reyonnah

Germany: Glas

Poland: FSO

Soviet Union. Trucks: KAZ; motorcycle: Minsk

UK: Arnott, Russon, Turner

USA: Nash-Healey

=== 1952 ===
France: Arista

France: Martin-Spéciale, Poinard

Germany: Brütsch, Champion

Soviet Union: PAZ

UK: Austin-Healey, BMC, Greeves, Lotus

USA: Allstate, Woodill

=== 1953 ===
China: BAW, FAW

East Germany: EMW

Japan: Subaru

USA: Eshelman, Fina-Sport

=== 1954 ===
France: Alpine, Facel Vega

Spain: Serveta

UK: Astra, Fairthorpe, Rodley, Swallow Doretti

USA: AMC, Studebaker-Packard

=== 1955 ===
Australia: Nota

Belgium: Meeussen

East Germany: Zwickau

France: Saviem, VELAM

Germany: Goggomobil

Italy: Autobianchi

Soviet Union: LAZ, LuAZ

UK: Ashley, Elva

=== 1956 ===
Argentina: IKA

Germany: Heinkel Kabine

Soviet Union: ZiL, [[K

(motorcycle)|TMZ]], Vyatka

UK: Berkeley, Tourette

USA: Auto Cub, Devin, Dual-Ghia

=== 1957 ===
East Germany: Trabant

France: Arbel, Atla

Germany: Neckar

Romania: ARO

UK: Peerless (Warwick), Scootacar, Tornado

USA: Aurora, Hackney

=== 1958 ===
Australia: Elfin

China: BAIC, Hongqi

Israel: Autocars

Soviet Union: KAvZ; trucks: BAZ, KrAZ

UK: Gill, Frisky

USA: Edsel, Streco Turnpike Cruiser

=== 1959 ===
Argentina: Siam Di Tella

China: Changan

East Germany: Melkus

India: Vehicle Factory Jabalpur

Ireland: Shamrock

Soviet Union: LiAZ

UK: Bristol Siddeley, Gilbern, Marcos, Mini

USA: Argonaut, Nu-Klea Starlite

== Classic era ==
=== 1960 ===
India: Ideal Jawa

UK: Ausper, Brabham, Rickman

US. Replica veteran car: Gaslight

=== 1961 ===
Germany: Amphicar

Soviet Union: ZAZ

UK: Diva

=== 1962 ===
Canada: Acadian

France: Automobiles René Bonnet

Iran: Iran Khodro

Soviet Union: AvtoKuban

Japan. Motorcycle: Kawasaki

USA: Apollo

=== 1963 ===
Brazil: Puma

Italy: ATS, Scuderia Serenissima, Lamborghini

UK: Bond, Gordon-Keeble

USA: Exner Revival Cars; trucks: Marmon

Japan: Honda (Car)

=== 1964 ===
Italy: ASA

Soviet Union: ErAZ

USA: Fiberfab

=== 1965 ===
Australia: Finch Restorations

France: Matra

India: Heavy Vehicles Factory

Iran: SAIPA

Italy: Ferves

Soviet Union: IzhAvto

Spain: IPV

UK: Jago, Peel

=== 1966 ===
Bulgaria: Bulgarrenault

Italy: Bizzarrini

New Zealand: Trekka

Soviet Union: Lada; trucks: MoAZ

Romania: Dacia

Soviet Union: ErAZ

Turkey: Anadol

UK: Norton-Villiers, Trident, Unipower

=== 1967 ===
Argentina: Andino

Bulgaria: Bulgaralpine

India: Tata motors

New Zealand: Anziel

=== 1968 ===
Italy: Autozodiaco, LMX Sirex

Turkey: Tofaş

UK: Piper

USA: Savage GT

=== 1969 ===
Australia. Trucks: RFW

Brazil. Cars: Gurgel

China: Dongfeng

Soviet Union. Trucks: Kamaz

UK: Enfield

=== 1970 ===
China: Changhe

=== 1972 ===
Greece: Namco

== Modern Classic Era (Late 1970s-1990s) ==
=== 1978 ===
Australia. PRB

=== 1979 ===
Australia. Bolwell

=== 1981 ===
Australia. Borland Python

India: Rajah

Spain: UROVESA

UK: Asquith

=== 1982 ===
China: Wuling

Germany: Isdera

Japan: Takeoka

=== 1983 ===
Argentina. Eniak

France: Aixam

Malaysia: Proton

UK: Sinclair

USA: Saleen

=== 1984 ===
China: Great Wall, Xinkai

France: Microcar, Venturi

UK: Ronart

=== 1985 ===
Italy: DR

Madagascar: Karenjy

UK: McLaren

USA: Mosler, Saturn

=== 1986 ===
Australia. Bufori

China: Geely, Seres

Japan: Acura, Tommykaira

Kenya: Nyayo

Taiwan: Ta Ching

=== 1987 ===
Mexico: Mastretta

=== 1988 ===
China: BeiBen, Foday, King Long, Shuanghuan

Germany: Wiesmann

Italy: Cizeta-Moroder (later Cizeta)

=== 1989 ===
Iran: Azar

Japan: Autozam, Eunos, Infiniti, Lexus

New Zealand: Saker

USA: Geo, NABI, Panoz

=== 1991 ===
Australia. Stohr

=== 1992 ===
China: Brilliance

=== 1993 ===
Malaysia: Perodua

=== 1994 ===
Ghana: Kantanka

=== 1995 ===
Australia. Jacer

=== 1996 ===
Australia. Bullet

China: Foton

=== 1997 ===
China: Ankai, Chery

=== 1998 ===
Australia. Puma

== Contemporary Era (2000s – 2010s) ==
=== 2001 ===
Australia. Devaux, Minetti

=== 2002 ===
Australia. FPV

=== 2003 ===
China: BYD Auto

USA: Tesla

=== 2004 ===
Australia. Joss, Spartan

=== 2005 ===
China: Zotye

=== 2006 ===
China: Bestune

Tunisia: Wallyscar

=== 2007 ===
Denmark: Zenvo

Nigeria: Innoson Vehicle Manufacturing

USA: Atieva (later Lucid), Fisker

=== 2008 ===
China: Everus

=== 2009 ===
Croatia: Rimac

USA: Rivian

== Modern/Current Era (2010s – Present) ==
=== 2010 ===
China: Baojun, Denza

Kenya: Mobius

=== 2014 ===
China: Nio, XPeng

Israel: City Transformer

USA: Nikola

=== 2015 ===
China: Li Auto

UK: Charge R&D (later Arrival)

=== 2016 ===
Germany: Sono

Sweden: Lynk & Co

UK: INEOS Automotive

=== 2017 ===
China: Aion, Arcfox, Exeed, Leapmotor

USA: Canoo

Vietnam: VinFast

=== 2018 ===
Hong Kong: Apex

Morocco: Neo

Turkey: Togg

USA: Lordstown (later Nu Ride)

=== 2021 ===
Canada: Edison

China: Xiaomi Auto, Zeekr

Spain: Silence

=== 2022 ===
China: Omoda

Saudi Arabia: Ceer

=== 2023 ===
China: Fangchengbao, ICar, Jaecoo, Yangwang

=== 2024 ===
China: Firefly, Onvo

== See also ==
- Automotive industry in the United Kingdom
- List of car manufacturers of the United Kingdom
- Automotive industry in the United Kingdom
- List of automobile manufacturers
- List of current automobile manufacturers by country
- List of current automobile marques
- List of steam car makers
- Orphan
