= Ardennais (disambiguation) =

The Ardennais is a draught horse

- L'Ardennais, newspaper (fr), part of Robert Hersant group
- L'Ardennais (automobile), manufactured in Rethel (Ardennes) from 1901 to around 1903
