= Carter Twin-Engine =

Defunct American motor vehicle manufacturer

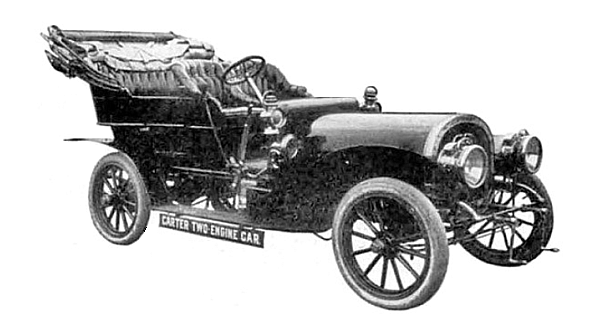
1907 Carter Twin-Engine

The Carter Twin-Engine was an American automobile manufactured between 1907 and 1908. Predecessor to the Washington, it featured two separate 35 hp internal combustion power units.
