= Autoette (1910 automobile) =

Defunct American motor vehicle manufacturer

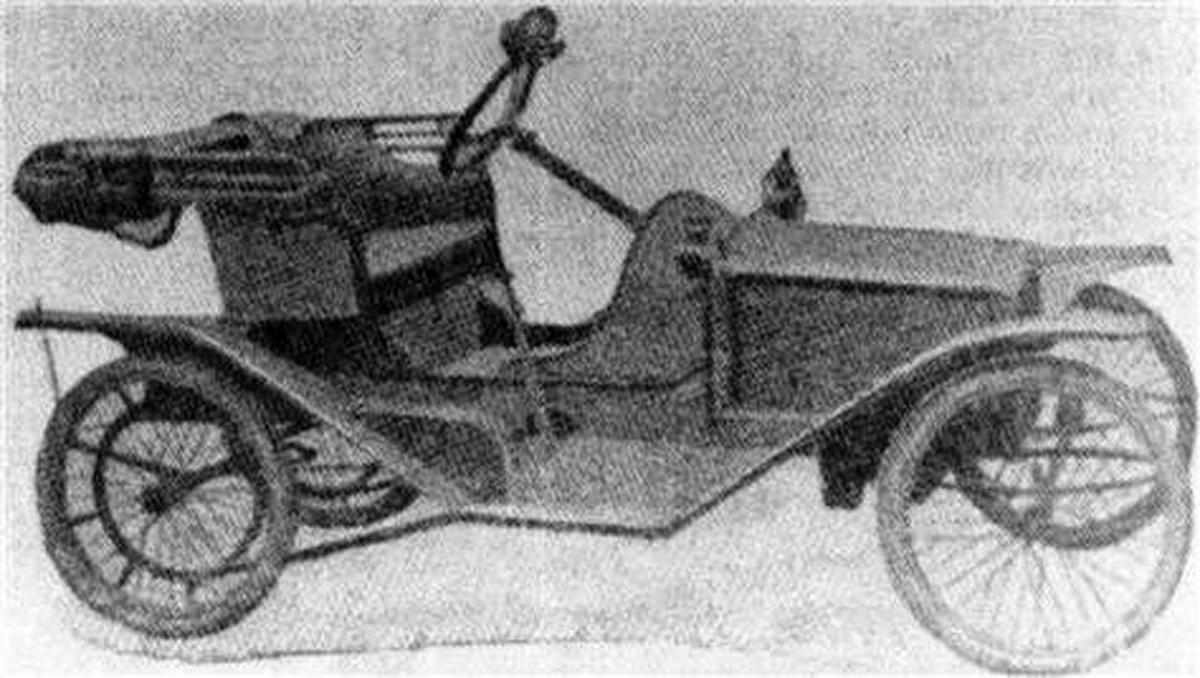
1910 Autoette

The Autoette, also known as the Manistee, was an American automobile manufactured in Manistee, Michigan by the Manistee Motor Car Company from 1910 to 1913. The Autoette was one of the first cyclecars. It had a single cylinder, 5 hp engine that was 0.4 L in size, and a friction transmission. The two-seater roadster cost $300.

== See also ==
- Brass Era car
