= Cavac =

Defunct American motor vehicle manufacturer

The Cavac was an American automobile manufactured in Detroit, Michigan in 1910 by the Small Motor Car Company. Their office was in Room 605 of the David Whitney Building. The Cavac was a four-cylinder car with an underslung chassis meant to sell for $1,050. It was water-cooled, roadster style, and had crankshaft main bearings with ball bearing cages. It was to be advertised as a roadster, but it never went past the prototype stage. After sending the prototype to the Auto Shows of 1911 (Detroit, Chicago, and New York) a reorganization was attempted in Philadelphia, but this venture fared no better there than it had in Detroit.

== See also ==
- Brass Era car
