= Henry (automobile) =

Defunct American motor vehicle manufacturer

The Henry was an American automobile built in Muskegon, Michigan by the Henry Motor Car Company from 1910 to 1912. The first model built was a five-seat tonneau with a 35 hp engine which sold for $1,750 (equivalent to $59,056 in 2024). Both 20 hp and 40 hp engines were made available in 1911, and these were available in five body styles. The 1911 two-seater roadster had running board mounted toolboxes.
