= Jacquet Flyer =

American automobile manufactured in 1921

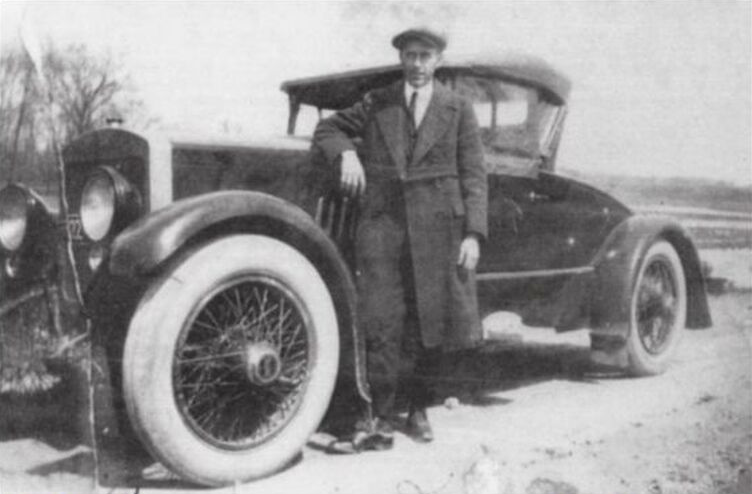
- Jacquet Flyer in 1921

Overview
- Manufacturer: Jacquet Motor Corporation of America
- Production: 1921
- Assembly: Belding, Michigan, United States

Body and chassis
- Class: Sports car

Powertrain
- Engine: four-cylinder Wisconsin engines of 6.2L capacity

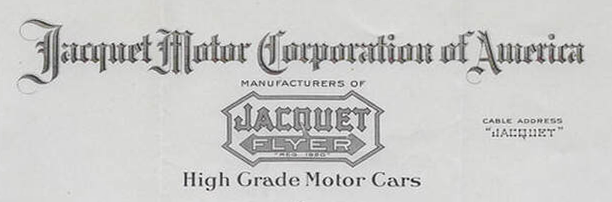
The logo of the Jacquet Motor Corporation of America and Jacquet Flyer.

Jacquet Flyer was a sports car manufactured in 1921 in Belding, Michigan, by Jacquet Motor Corporation of America.

== History ==
Built by the Jacquet Motor Corporation of America, the Jacquet Flyer was a sports car which was priced at $4,000 equivalent to $72,201 in 2025. The Flyer had a 124-inch (3,100 mm) wheelbase and wire wheels were standard. The Flyer, only one of which were made, was powered by four-cylinder Wisconsin engines of 6.2L capacity; the only model offered was a two-passenger roadster.
