= Atlas (1951 automobile) =

The Atlas was a mini-car made in France in 1951. Originally known as La Coccinelle, it used a single-cylinder engine of a mere 175 cc capacity. The fiberglass body seated two, with a maximum speed over 40 miles per hour (64 km/h).
