= Colonial Motors =

Colonial Motors Ltd. was a Canadian automobile manufacturer based in Walkerville, Ontario that produced one prototype in 1922. It was designed by Earl G. Gunn, who had previously been with Packard. This prototype, the Canadian, had a six-cylinder engine and Canada's first independent front suspension.
