= Hewitt-Lindstrom (automobile) =

Defunct American motor vehicle manufacturer

Hewitt-Lindstrom was a United States automobile manufacturer which produced electric stanhope style automobiles from 1900 to 1901. The company was based in Chicago, Illinois.

== See also ==
- Brass Era car
- List of defunct United States automobile manufacturers
