= Correja =

Defunct American motor vehicle manufacturer

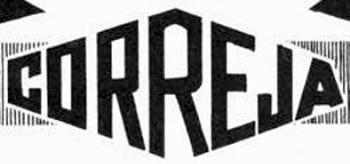
- Industry: Automobiles
- Founded: 1908
- Defunct: 1915
- Headquarters: Iselin, New Jersey

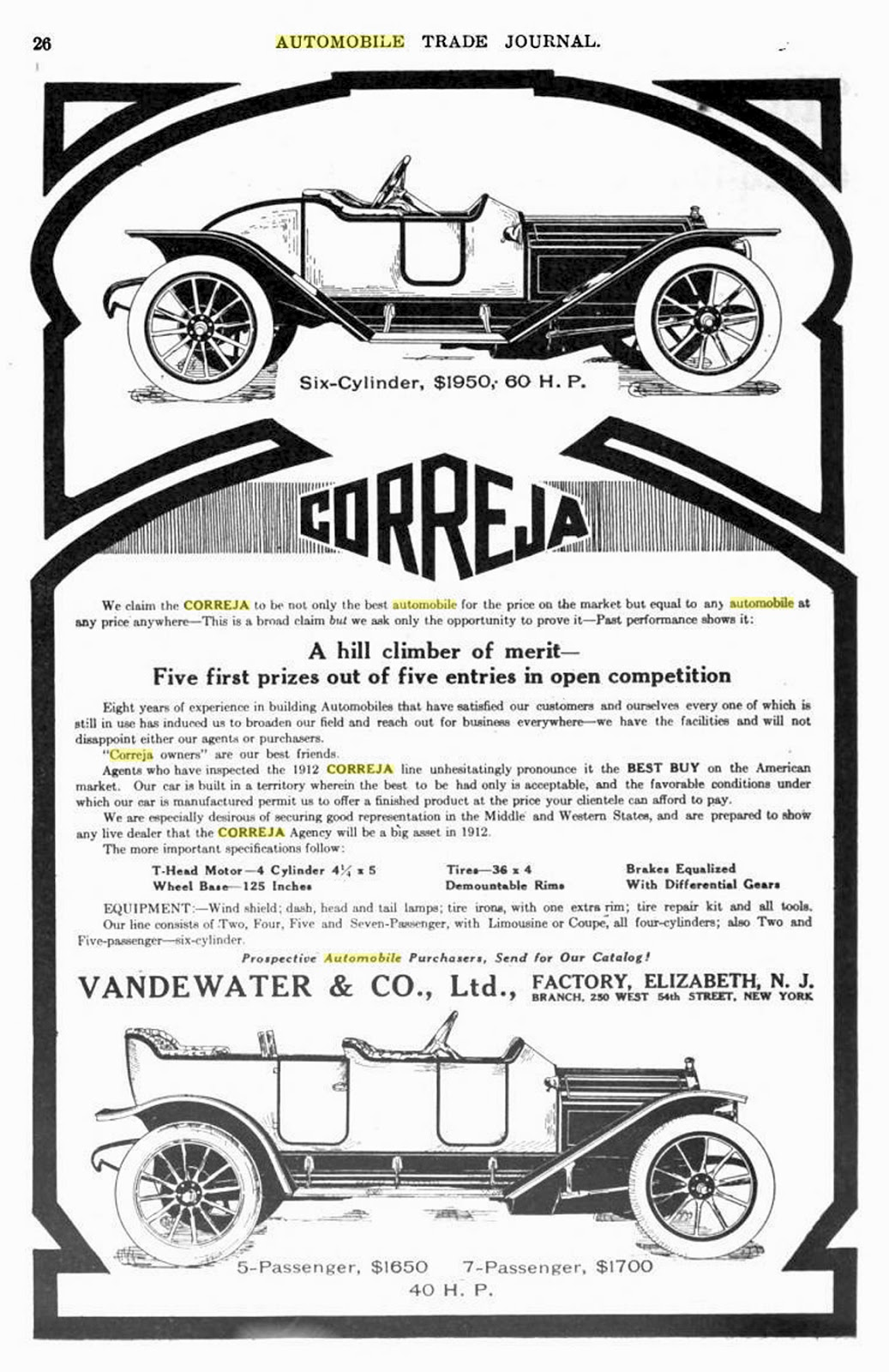
Correja Advertisement

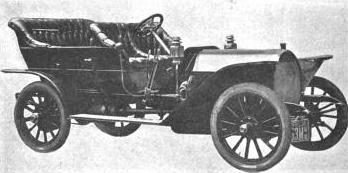
1909 Correja Touring Car

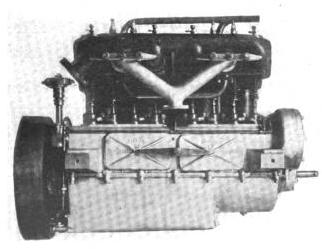
1909 Correja Motor

The Correja was an American automobile produced from 1908 to 1915. Built by Vandewater & Co. of Iselin, New Jersey, and then later Elizabeth, New Jersey the car was a shaft-driven 40 hp four of 5808 cc.

In 1909 the company would move from Iselin to Elizabeth, New Jersey.

In 1910 Vandewater & Co. would incorporate at $100,000. The incorporators would be J. Correja, F.C. Vandewater E. Vandewater and S.R Vandewater.

== Models ==
The first car that Correja would produce would be unveiled around August of 1908 as a 1909 model. The car would simply be known to the public as "The Correja" and would be offered in three body styles initially. A touring car, and a runabout with and without a rumble seat, and with a double rumble seat. The engine was a four cylinder motor making 39 horsepower made by Waukesha. The transmission would be a three speed. The car was left hand drive with a 110 inch wheelbase and would sell for $1,900. By the company's own admission the car was relatively unoriginal, but had high workmanship.

In July of 1909 the car would now be referred to as the "Model T" and would be advertised as making 40 horsepower.

The 1910 Model would have its price increased to $2,200. There were not significant changes made during this cycle. The cars were painted dark green with red running gear.
