= Gareau =

The Gareau was a Canadian automobile manufactured only in 1910. Only three 35 hp worm-drive fours were completed before the firm, based in Montreal, folded for lack of working capital. The models were named La Nationale, La Marmon, and La KisselKar.
