= Ware Steam Wagon =

Defunct American motor vehicle manufacturer

The Ware Steam Wagon was likely the first self-propelled American vehicle to be manufactured for export, produced from 1861 to 1867 by Elijah Ware of Bayonne, New Jersey. In 1866 one of his vehicles was shipped to Rustico, Prince Edward Island, where it had been ordered by Catholic priest Georges-Antoine Belcourt.
