= Engler (automobile) =

Defunct American motor vehicle manufacturer

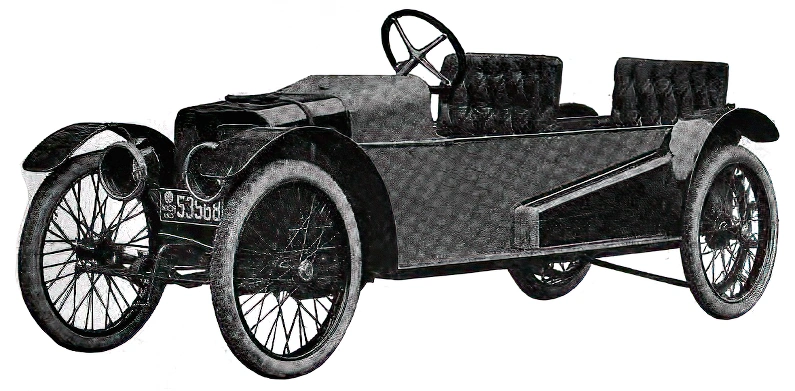
1914 Engler Cyclecar

The Engler was a brass era American cyclecar manufactured in Pontiac, Michigan by the W.B. Engler Cyclecar Company from 1914 to 1915. The Engler was a two-seater cyclecar that used a DeLuxe air-cooled, a 1.2L two-cylinder engine. The vehicle had a friction transmission and belts, and cost $385 (equivalent to $12,375 in 2025).
