= Upton (automobile) =

Defunct car manufacturer

The Upton Motor Company
- Type: Automobile Manufacturing
- Industry: Automotive
- Genre: Touring Cars
- Founded: 1904
- Defunct: 1907
- Headquarters: Lebanon, Pennsylvania, United States
- Area served: United States
- Products: Vehicles; Automotive parts

The Upton Motor Company of Lebanon, Pennsylvania, was manufacturer of the Upton automobile, a five-passenger Touring Car. The company was founded in 1904 and ended production in 1907.

This was the second automobile named Upton. The first was produced from 1900 to 1904 in Beverly, Massachusetts by the same designer, Colcord Upton and had similar features.

== Advertisements ==
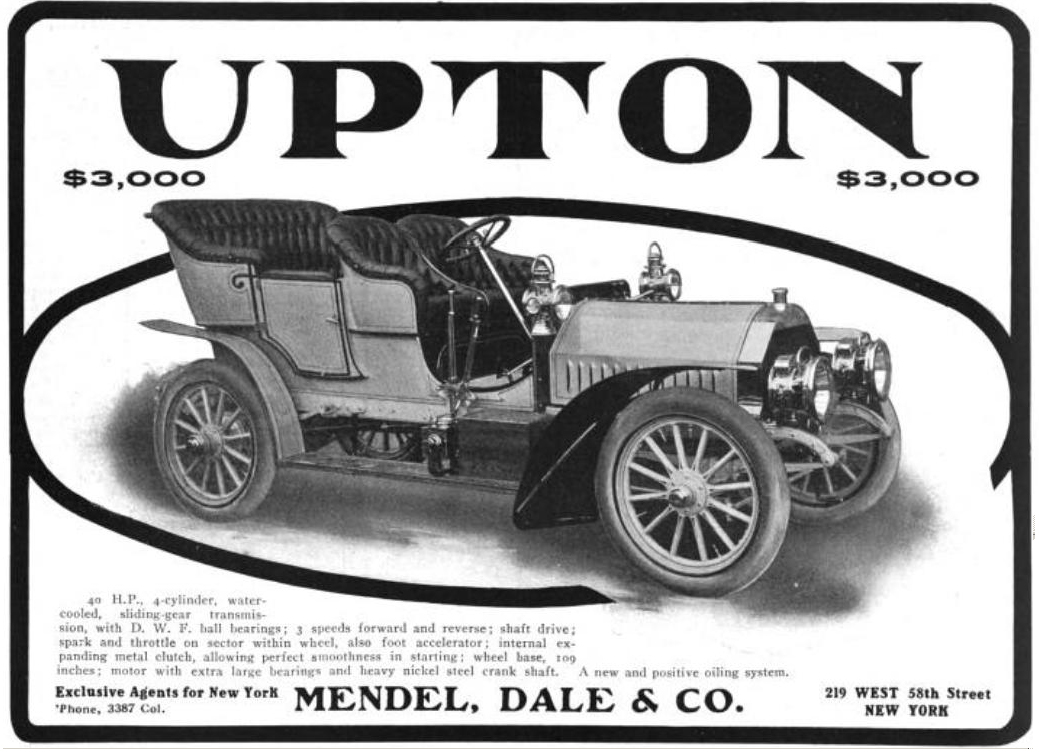
Upton Touring Car - 40-horsepower - 1906
