= Crane & Breed =

Defunct American motor vehicle manufacturer

The Crane & Breed was an American automobile manufactured between 1912 and 1917 in Cincinnati, Ohio. The company produced a 48 hp six in 1912, before turning its attention mainly to the crafting of ambulances and hearses.
