= American Juvenile Electric =

Electric automobile for children made in 1907

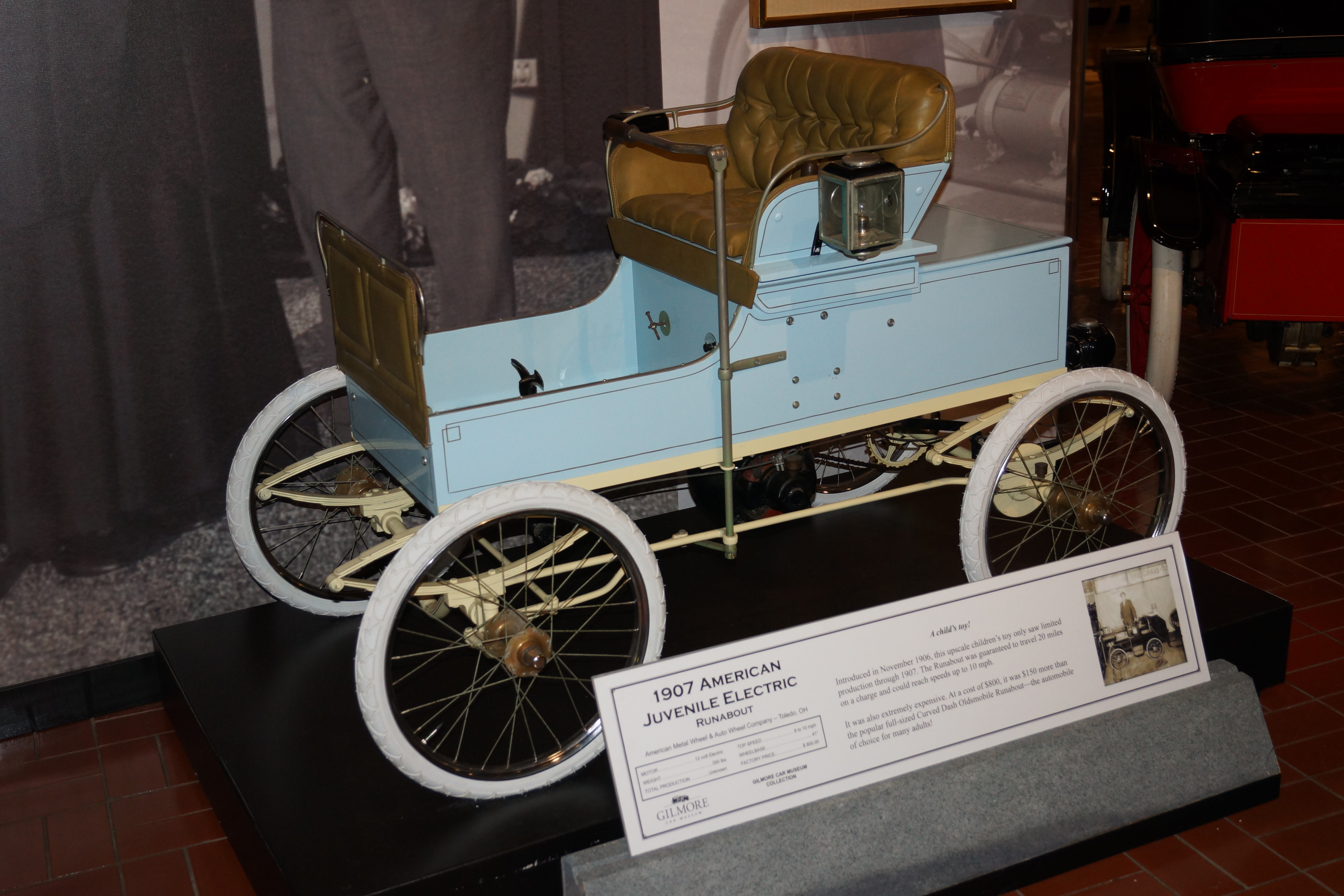
An American Juvenile Electric Runabout at the Gilmore Car Museum

The American Juvenile Electric was an electric car made by the American Metal Wheel & Auto Co of Toledo, Ohio, in 1907. Its wheelbase was a mere 3 feet 5 inches (1.04 m), but it was complete with ‘lights, bells, etc.’ and had tiller steering. Its top speed was 10 mph (16 km/h), and it could go 20 miles (32 km) on a charge. At $800, it cost more than many full-size cars.
