= Andino =

Automobile manufacturer

- Industry: Automobile
- Founded: 1967
- Headquarters: Buenos Aires, Argentina

Andino was a small automobile manufacturer that was founded in 1967 and was based in Buenos Aires, Argentina. Andino built sports coupés using Renault engines.
