= Herdtle & Bruneau =

French motorcycle company

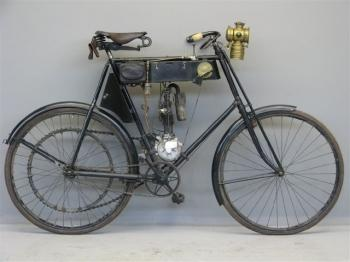
A 1 horsepower motorcycle made by Herdtle-Bruneau

Herdtle & Bruneau was a French maker of motorcycles. In 1905 they introduced motorized roller skates to the public. Each skate contained a 1 hp motor; controls could then be affixed to the skater's belt, and would be linked via flexible cables to the skates. Top speed for the contraption was said to be a brakeless 66 km/h (41 mph). Unsurprisingly, the idea did not catch on, and the line of motorized skates was discontinued by the end of the year.
