= Moore Automobile Company =

Defunct American motor vehicle manufacturer

- The Ball Bearing Car
- Company type: Automobile Manufacturing
- Industry: Automotive
- Founded: 1906; 120 years ago
- Founder: W.J.P. Moore and F. D. Howe
- Defunct: 1907; 119 years ago
- Headquarters: New York City, United States
- Area served: United States
- Products: Vehicles; Automotive parts

The Moore Automobile Company of New York City was the manufacturer of the Moore automobile, known as "The Ball Bearing Car". The company was founded in 1906 with a factory in Bridgeport, Connecticut. W. J. P. Moore and F. D. Howe designed a 40-hp four-cylinder with a manganese bronze crankcase and ball bearings used every where. The limousine was priced at $8,000, equivalent to $286,667 in 2025, and did not survive two years.

== Advertisements ==
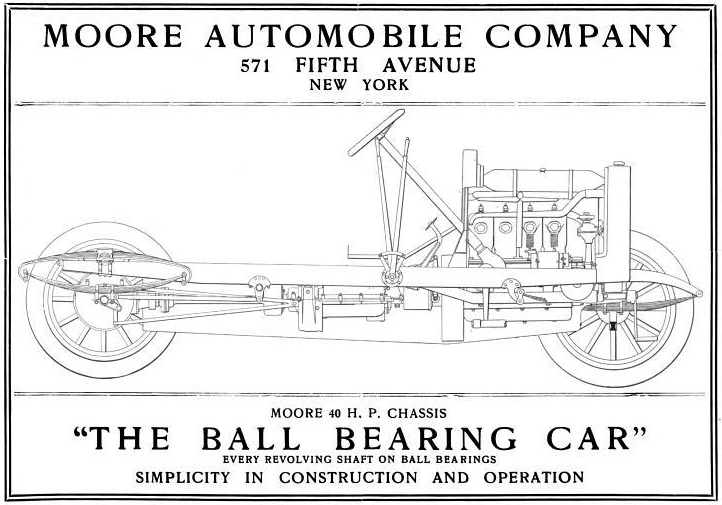
1906 Moore Automobile Advertisement

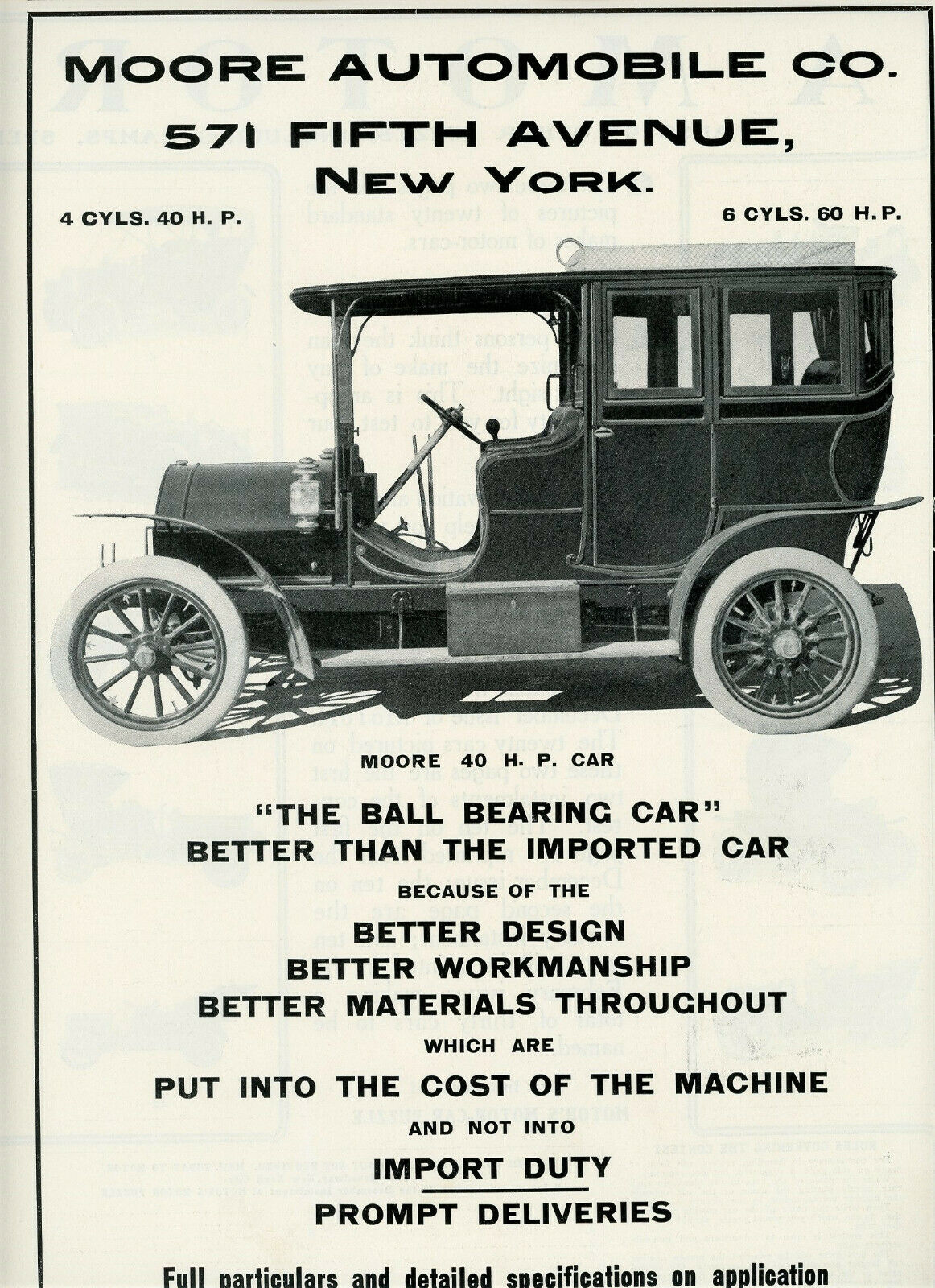
1907 Moore Automobile Advertisement
