= Brew-Hatcher =

Defunct American motor vehicle manufacturer

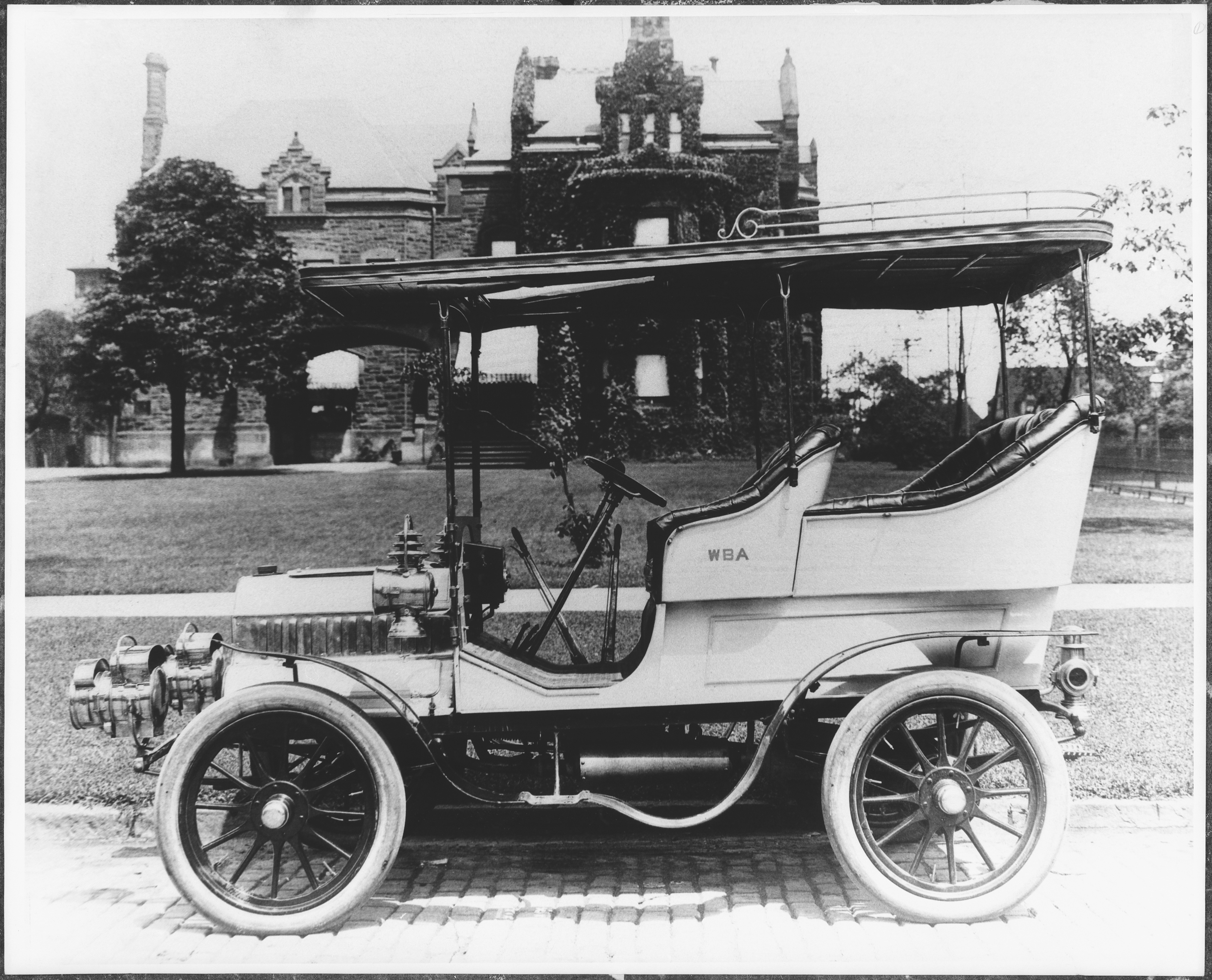
Brew-Hatcher Automobile

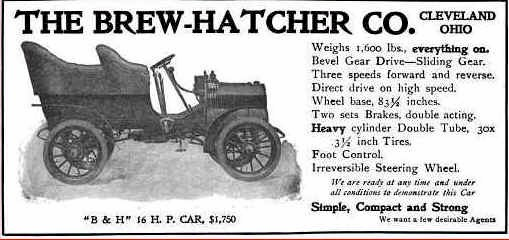
1904 Brew-Hatcher Automobile Advertisement

The Brew-Hatcher or B & H was an American automobile introduced in January 1904 at the Chicago Automobile Show and manufactured from 1904 until 1905.

Around 1903 William A. Hatcher, one of the founders of and engineers for the Ohio Automobile Company (which later became known as the Packard Motor Car Company) and Francis O. Brew started a component supply company. They launched their first automobile, built from many of their company's components, in January 1904.

1904 Model: A five-passenger, 16 hp tourer, it hailed from Cleveland, Ohio. 16 hp horizontally opposed twin engine and rear-entrance tonneau body.

Specifications:

- Weighs 1,000 lbs, everything on.
- Bevel Gear Drive - Sliding Gear.
- Three speeds forward and reverse.
- Direct drive on high speed.
- Wheel base, 83 1/2" inches.
- Two sets Brakes, double acting.
- Heavy cylinder Double Tube, 30x3 1/2 inch Tires.
- Foot Control.
- Irreversible Steering Wheel."

Price: $1,750

1905 Model: The same model was offered, but on a longer wheelbase, which allowed for a side-entrance tonneau, and there was also an 18/24 hp 4-cylinder tourer.

Car manufacture ended in Fall 1905 when Brew retired to join the Internal Revenue Service.
