= Reading Steamer =

Defunct American motor vehicle manufacturer

Steam Vehicle Company of America Meteor Engineering Company
- Industry: Automotive
- Founded: 1901; 125 years ago
- Founder: Irvin D. Lengel
- Defunct: 1903; 123 years ago
- Fate: Closed
- Headquarters: Reading, Pennsylvania, United States
- Products: Steam car

The Reading and Meteor were American steam cars developed by Irvin D. Lengel in 1901 in Reading, Pennsylvania.

== Reading Steam Carriage ==
Built by the Steam Vehicle Company of America, their advertisement promised their Model B "runs indefinitely without attention." The steamer featured a four-cylinder steam engine when most steamers used two-cylinders.

It had a bench seat over the engine compartment with tiller type steering. Drive was by chain to the rear wheels. The Model B sold for $850, equivalent to $31,630 in 2025. A year into the production of the Reading, creditors liquidated the company.

== Meteor Steam Car ==
Irvin D. Lengel was also a principal of Meteor Engineering Company who took over the assets of the Steam Vehicle Company of America in 1902. Meteor built a tonneau version of the steam car. Meteor also built a prototype gasoline automobile, but by the fall of 1903, Meteor Engineering Company was bankrupt.
