= Iroquois Motor Car Company =

Defunct American motor vehicle manufacturer

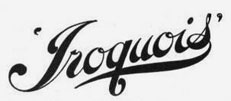
- Industry: Automotive
- Predecessor: Leggett Carriage Company
- Founded: 1903; 123 years ago
- Founder: John S. Leggett
- Defunct: 1907; 119 years ago
- Fate: Foreclosure
- Headquarters: Syracuse, New York, later moved to Seneca Falls, New York, United States
- Products: Automobiles

Iroquois Motor Car Company (1903–1907) was a manufacturer of automobiles in Syracuse, New York, and later, Seneca Falls, New York.

== History ==
The company was founded by John S. Leggett as Leggett Carriage Company and originally specialized in the production of automobile bodies.

The Iroquois was a four-cylinder car with sliding gear transmission and shaft drive. Horsepower and size increasing yearly up to a 40hp model in 1907.

In 1907, the Type C represented the entry-level model. The engine was rated at 25/30 hp. The wheelbase was 104 inches = 2642 mm. The track gauge was 56 inches = 1422 mm. The vehicle weight was 2400 pounds = 1089 kg. The touring car had five seats. The selling price was 2400 dollars. The top model in 1907 was the Type D. Its engine was rated at 35/40 hp. The wheelbase measured 108 inches = 2743 mm. The track width was 56 inches = 1422 mm. The vehicle weight was 2800 pounds = 1270 kg. The selling price was 2800 dollars. The body was a seven-seater touring car.

== Advertisements ==
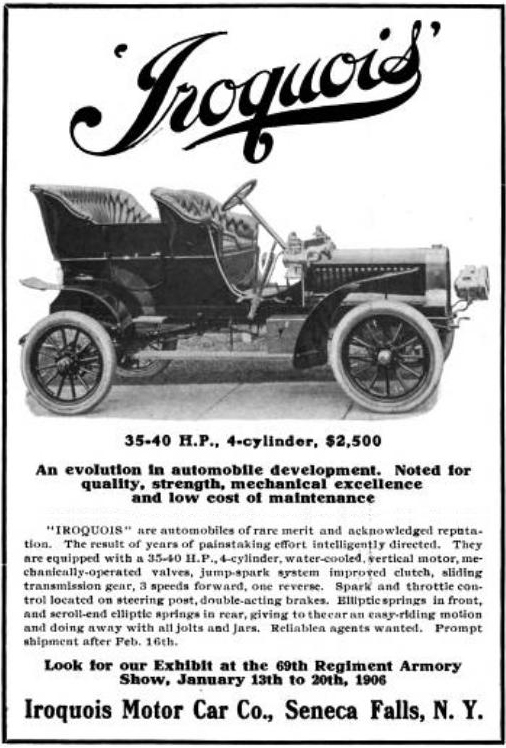
1905 Iroquois Motor Car advertisement

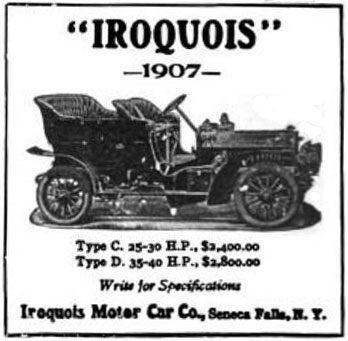
1907 Iroquois Motor Car advertisement

== See also ==
Brass Era car
