= Black Motor Company (1899) =

Defunct American motor vehicle manufacturer

The Black was an American brass era automobile built in Indianapolis, Indiana, in 1899.
