= Washington Motor Company =

Defunct American motor vehicle manufacturer

The Washington Motor Company was an American automobile manufacturer based in Eaton, Ohio and later Middletown, Ohio, that produced the "Washington" automobile between 1921 and 1924.

The company was set up by local Eaton businessman Otto M Shipley, who gained the support of other local business people to provide capital for the venture. The prototype Washington used a Falls X9000 6-cylinder engine, but it was found to use too much oil, and was replaced by a 7R Continental engine for the 1921 Model B tourer. In 1922 the Model C was introduced, which featured a larger 8R Continental engine, and a wider range of body styles - tourer, sport, sedan and California top tourer. Prices ranged from $1785 for the tourer up to $2385 for the sedan. Company slogans included "The Ideal of a Nation" and "Washington - A Name That Stands for Character and Strength".

In 1924 the company moved to Middletown, and commenced work on a steam-powered car, which was identical in styling to the Model C tourer, except for the use of disc instead of artillery wheels. Only three steamers were built before the company went bankrupt in December 1924, due to expending all of its working capital on the new factory. Total Washington production is estimated at between 25 and 60 gasoline powered cars and the three steamers.
