= Fina-Sport =

Defunct American motor vehicle manufacturer

The Fina-Sport was an American automobile manufactured from 1953 until 1954. The brainchild of Perry Fina, it used a 210 hp (160 kW) Cadillac V-8 engine and Hydramatic transmission mounted on a Ford chassis. Styling of both convertibles and hardtops was by Vignale.
