= King-Remick =

American automobile

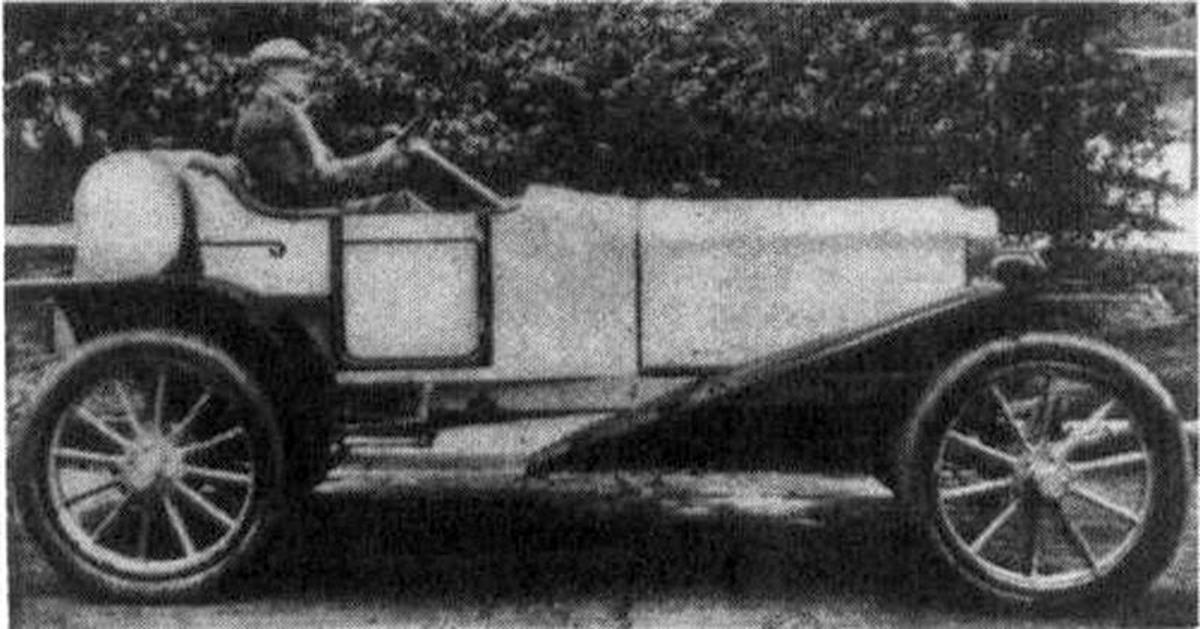
1910 King-Remick

The King-Remick was a brass era automobile built in Detroit, Michigan, in 1910.

== History ==
The Autoparts Manufacturing Company built for King-Remick a two-seat roadster. It was powered by a (6.6 liter) six-cylinder engine, with shaft drive and a wheelbase of nearly 120-inch (3,000 mm). It was claimed this "gives perfect distribution of the load". Probably only the prototype was built.

== Sources ==
- Clymer, Floyd. Treasury of Early American Automobiles, 1877-1925. New York: Bonanza Books, 1950.
- G.N. Georgano The Complete Encyclopedia of Motorcars, 1885 to Present. 1968.
