= Canadian Motor =

Canadian electric car manufactured from 1900 until 1902

- Industry: Automobiles
- Founded: 1900; 126 years ago
- Defunct: 1902
- Headquarters: Toronto, Ontario, Canada
- Products: Electric cars

The Canadian Motor was a Canadian electric car manufactured from 1900 until 1902.

Billed as being "ideal for any first-class automobilist to drive", the cars could travel up to 45 mi (72 km) on one change of their batteries. Although located in Toronto, the concern which built Canadian Motors was English-owned; models were derived from the first electrics manufactured in Canada, designed from 1893 by W. J. Still. Still designed a gasoline-powered car as well, a 5 hp (3.7 kW) model built in 1898. This was controlled by a steering column which could move backwards and forwards, thus providing forward or reverse motion.
