= C-A-C (cyclecar) =

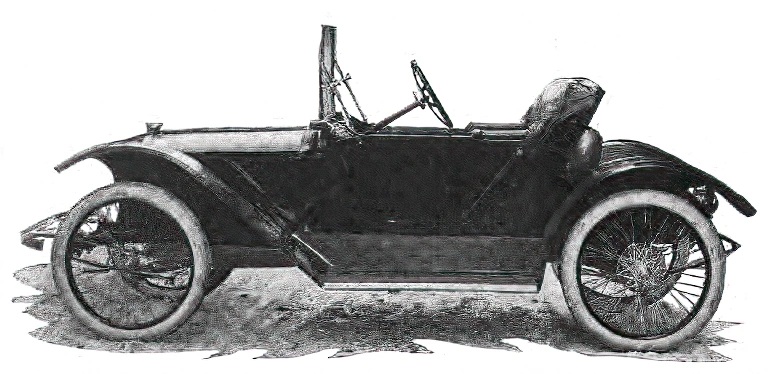
1914 C-A-C

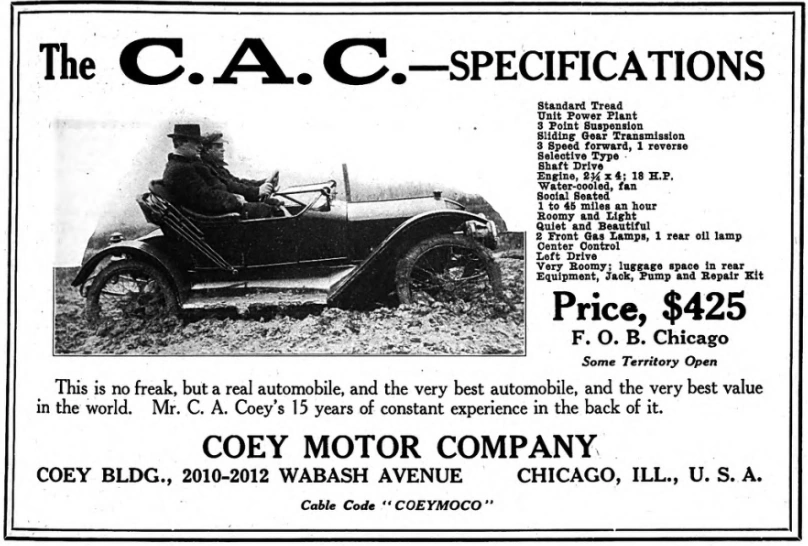
1914 C-A-C advertisement

C-A-C is a cycle car that was produced in Chicago, Illinois from 1914 to 1916. The open roadster cost $425, while for $650 the buyer got a closed-body cycle car. The engine was a water-cooled 12 hp four-cylinder which ran on gas.
