= Junior R =

1924 vintage automobile

The Junior R was an American automobile manufactured in 1924.

== History ==
A one-off, it was built for John J. Raskob, Jr., son of the vice-president for finance of General Motors, by Wellington W. Muir of the Harrison Radiator Company. The touring car consisted of components taken from Chevrolets, Oaklands, and Cadillacs, and featured disc wheels and a 111-inch (2,800 mm) wheelbase. The car was later given to Muir who gave the car back to Harrison Radiator in 1971.
