= All British Ford =

The ABF or All British Ford was a car manufactured by Canadian born garage owner and inventor Albert (Bertie) Ford in Kenilworth, Warwickshire between 1918 and 1920. Engines used included a water-cooled two-stroke flat-twin and a four-stroke 4-cylinder V-pattern with shaft drive to the rear wheels via a 3-speed gearbox in unit with the engine.

Series production was intended but a combination of the early post-war slump in England, illness to Ford and competition from better-funded manufacturers meant that only prototypes were built.
