= Dingfelder =

Defunct American motor vehicle manufacturer

Dingfelder (1903) was an automobile brand produced by the Dingfelder Motor Company, which was located at 958 Jefferson Street in Detroit, and had an auto garage at 41–43 Washington Street.

== History ==
In 1903 they produced a number of two-passenger runabouts. In 1904 they manufactured boats.

=== Runabout ===
The Dingfelder Runabout weighed 500 lb (230 kg) It had custom designed engine known as the Maximotor. The early model was a 3.5 hp (2.6 kW) one-cylinder motor. The car was listed for $500 and could go a "great speed if desired" The flywheel was reportedly "very large", and there was one forward gear and no reverse. Top speed was estimated to be 4 to 20 miles and hour. The car had tiller steering and wire wheels and could seat two people.

=== Reviews ===
One magazine reported that "Mr (Max) Dingfelder is held in high esteem for his honorable business methods and sterling integrity," and "the machine has been very well received by the local trade and a nice business is anticipated."

== Engines ==
Around 1911 to 1913 the range expanded, models included four- and six-cylinder in-line and V-8 water-cooled engines.

- Type: In-line, 4 cylinders, liquid-cooled
- Power rating: 52 KW (70 hp) at 1,500 rpm
- Displacement: 7.0 L (430 cu in)
- Bore and Stroke: 12.7 cm (5.0 in) x 14.0 cm (5.5 in)
- Weight (wet): 118 kg (260 lb) (3.71 lb/hp)
- Date: 1912
- Dimensions:
- Length 104 .1 (41.0 in.),
- Width 40.6 cm (16.0 in.),
- Height 273.7 cm (9.0 in.)
- Inventory Number: A19500094005

In addition to their present staff, the Maxlmotor makers, Detroit, have engaged the services of a Detroit automobile designer whose cars are being turned out at the rate of over 800 weekly. He is co-operating with the Maximotor designer, Mr. Dingfelder. Among the recent purchasers of Maximotor engines is Mr. Lewis Matthews, official and part owner of the Malleable Stove Works of South Bend, Ind., who has now resigned to invest in an aviation enterprise.

== Boats ==
While the car business did not survive into 1904, Max Dingfelder did better with boats, and won a big race that was sponsored by the Detroit Yacht Club in 1906 with his auto boat "999".

The Dingfelder Motor Co exhibited a six-cylinder 60 horsepower, a four-cylinder, 30-40 and a two-cylinder 15-20 at the 1908 Detroit motor show.

== Flying machines and airplanes ==
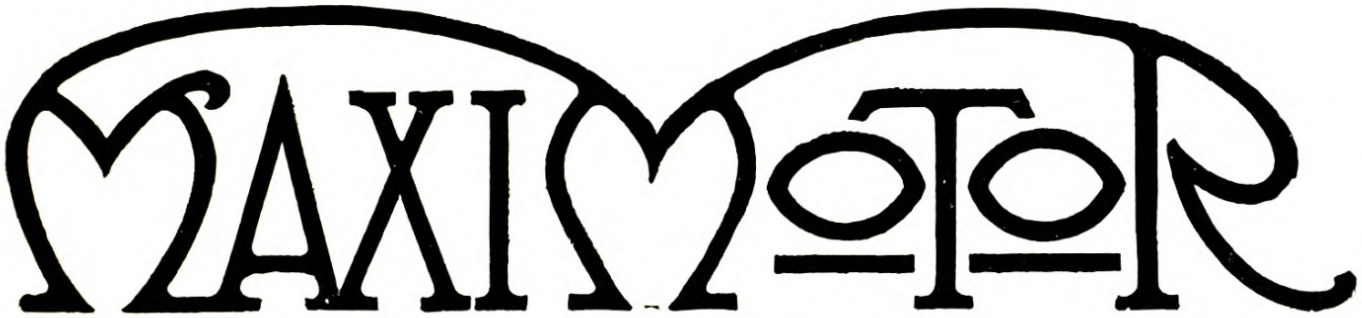
Maximotor Logo

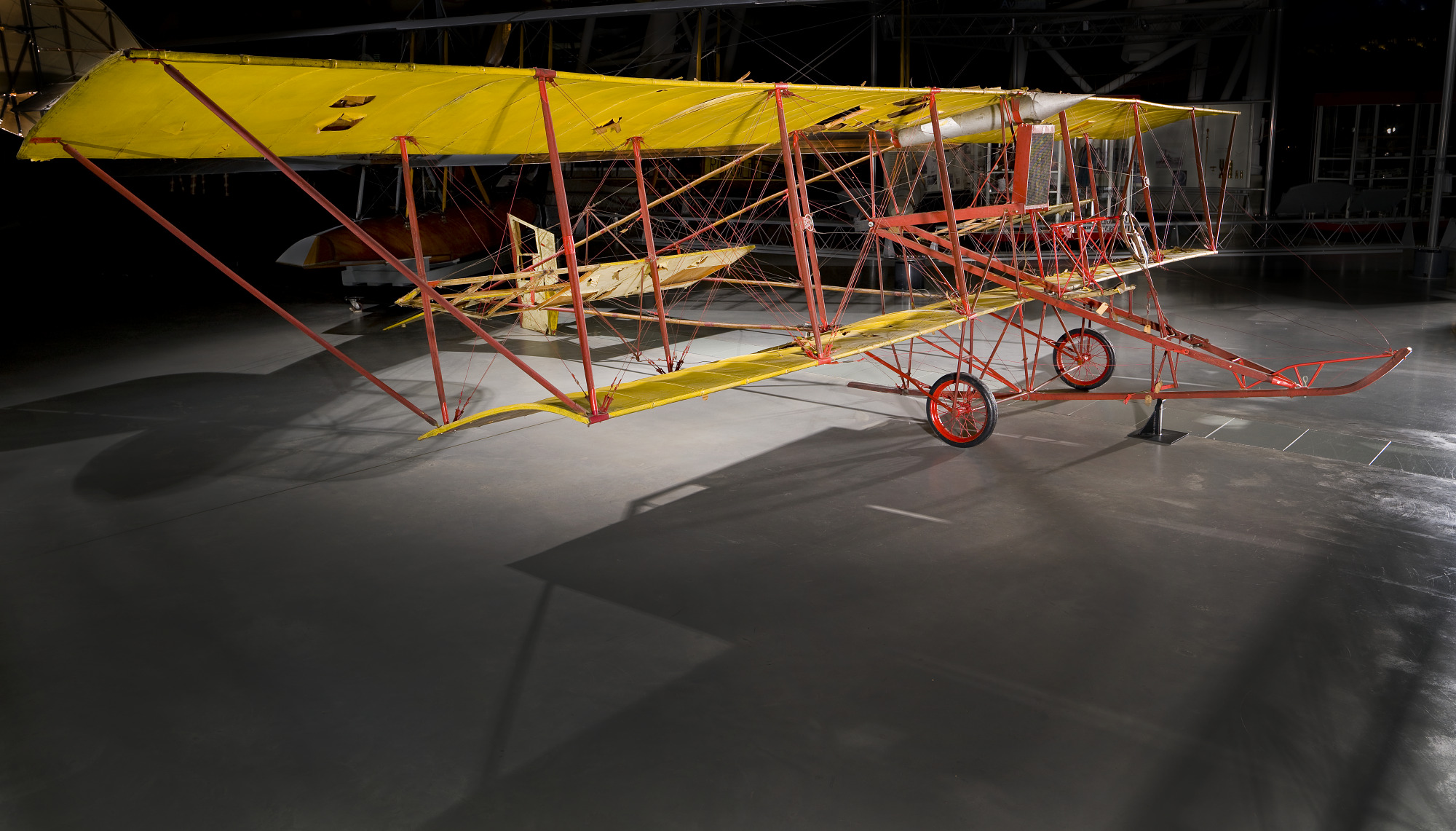
Baldwin Red Devil

Max Dingfelder patented a flying machine The Maximotor 52 kW (70 hp) Model B-4 was the last of several that powered Thomas S. Baldwin's Red Devil III aircraft. Maximotors were used on aircraft such as those built by Wright, Curtiss, Bleriot, and Farman and Antoinette. He also got a patent (991,770) in 1911 for Stability and steering rudders
