= Fischer (automobile) =

Defunct American motor vehicle manufacturer

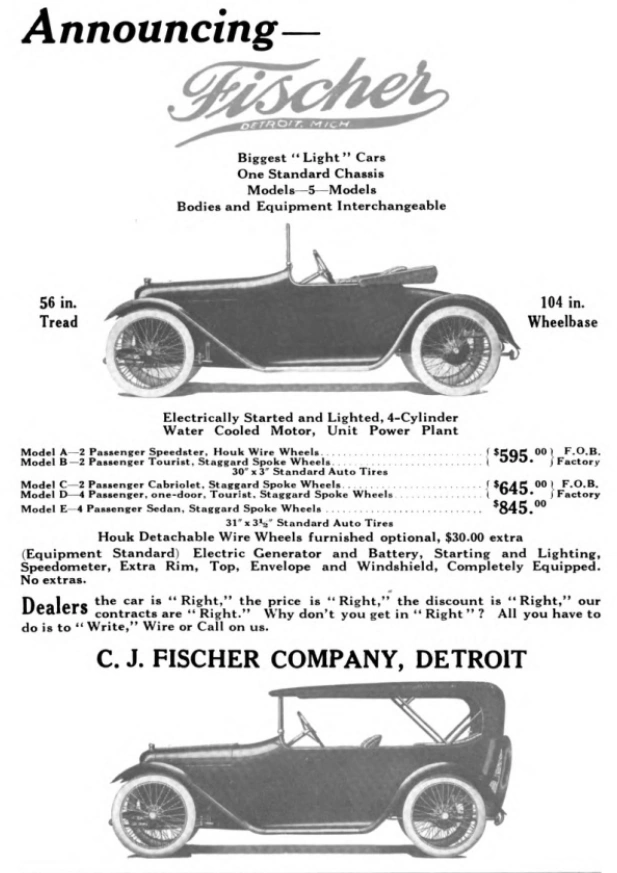
1914 Fischer advertisement from the Automobile Trade Directory

The Fischer was an American brass era automobile manufactured in Detroit, Michigan by the C.J. Fischer Company in 1914. It was a light car, built as a two- or four-seater model, including a sedan. It had a Perkins four-cylinder water-cooled 1.2L engine. It had a selective transmission and shaft drive. The two-seater cost $525, and the sedan cost $845.
