= Adria (automobile) =

Defunct American motor vehicle manufacturer

Overview
- Production: 1921-1922
- Assembly: Batavia, New York

Powertrain
- Engine: four-cylinder 2932 cc engine made by Supreme

The Adria was an American assembled car that was promoted though not actually mass-produced. The address of the makers was given as Batavia, New York. About 20 to 40 prototypes were built from 1921 to 1922, but that was as far as the project went. The five-seat touring car was advertised at US$1495.

It was to have a four-cylinder 2932 cc engine made by Supreme and a 3-part frame chassis, which resulted in a patent dispute with Parenti Motors.
