= Adams (1903 automobile) =

British automobile manufactured 1903

H. Adams
- Industry: Automotive
- Founded: 1903; 123 years ago
- Defunct: 1906
- Headquarters: Tunbridge Wells, Kent, England

Adams was an automobile introduced and manufactured by the Adams Manufacturing Co. Ltd. from 1903 to 1906. It was developed by H. Adams, of Tunbridge Wells, Kent, England, who offered a conversion set that converted horse-drawn carriages into motorized automobiles. The engine was mounted on a swivelling fore-carriage, and steering was achieved through wheel and vertical column.

In 1905, Adams produced a small two-cylinder light car sold under the name 'One of the Best'.
