= Autogear =

The Autogear was a three-wheeler car built in Leeds, Yorkshire between 1922 and 1923. The Autogear was different from most other three-wheelers in having only one wheel at the front and two wheels at the rear. The air-cooled 10 hp V-twin engine drove the front wheel, which also steered. The Autogear weight 7.75 cwt and cost 185 pounds. In 1923 production moved to Dublin, and the car was renamed the Leprechan.
