= Virginian (automobile) =

Defunct American motor vehicle manufacturer

The Virginian was an automobile produced briefly, 1911 and 1912, by the Richmond Iron Works of Richmond, Virginia, USA.

== See also ==
- Kline Kar
