= Electric vehicles introduced in the 19th century =

Battery-electric road vehicles introduced before 1900

This is a chronological list of battery-electric road vehicles introduced in the 19th century. It includes documented experimental vehicles, prototypes and commercially produced cars, cabs, vans and trucks. Small-scale demonstrators are listed separately because they were important to the development of electric propulsion but were not road-going vehicles.

The dates record the earliest documented completion, public demonstration or commercial introduction of the vehicle—not the incorporation date of a company. For consistency with Wikipedia's existing vehicle-introduction categories, this list ends with 1899; vehicles introduced in 1900 are placed in Electric vehicles introduced in the 20th century. The list excludes rail vehicles, trolleybuses and other vehicles powered continuously from an external supply, as well as hybrids and companies for which no completed electric road vehicle is documented. Because surviving records are incomplete and sometimes contradictory, especially before 1890, this list may never be complete.

== Experimental and model vehicles ==
Introduced	Vehicle	Manufacturer or designer	Wikipedia article or external reference
1828	Jedlik electric vehicle model	Ányos Jedlik	Ányos Jedlik
c. 1832–1839	Anderson electric carriage	Robert Anderson	Robert Anderson (inventor)
1835	Stratingh–Becker electric cart	Sibrandus Stratingh and Christopher Becker	

== Road-going vehicles ==
Introduced	Vehicle	Manufacturer or designer	Wikipedia article or external reference
1881	Trouvé electric tricycle	Gustave Trouvé	Gustave Trouvé
1881	Jeantaud electric Tilbury	Charles Jeantaud	
1882	Ayrton and Perry electric tricycle	William Edward Ayrton and John Perry	
c. 1884 (Note: The often-cited 1884 date is not supported by surviving contemporary documentation; the earliest known photograph is dated 1895.)	Parker electric car	Thomas Parker / Elwell-Parker	Thomas Parker (inventor)
1887	Volk electric tricycle	Magnus Volk	Magnus Volk
1888	Flocken Elektrowagen	Maschinenfabrik A. Flocken / Andreas Flocken	Flocken Elektrowagen
1888	Immisch electric dogcart	Immisch & Company	
1888	Kimball electric tricycle	Fred M. Kimball	
1889	Slattery electric tricycle	M. M. Slattery / Fort Wayne Jenney Electric Light Company	
1890	Morrison electric carriage	William Morrison / Shaver Carriage Company	
1891	Riker electric tricycle (Note: The precise date of Andrew Riker's first electric tricycle is disputed. Contemporary documentation supports the early 1890s; 1891 is used here rather than the sometimes-repeated 1884 date.)	Andrew L. Riker	Riker Electric Vehicle Company
1892	Aspinwall electric tricycle	Louis M. Aspinwall	
1892	Keller–Degenhardt electric tricycle and perambulator	Henry G. Degenhardt and William R. Keller / Columbia Perambulator Company	
1892	Siemens electric fire engine	Siemens Brothers	
1893	Dickson–Still electric carriage	Dickson Carriage Works / William Joseph Still	
1893	Ward electric cab and bus prototypes	Ward Electrical Car Company / Radcliffe Ward and Walter Bersey	
1894	Electrobat	Henry G. Morris and Pedro G. Salom	Electrobat
1894	Garrard & Blumfield electric carriage	Garrard & Blumfield / Taylor, Cooper & Bednell	Garrard & Blumfield
1894	Kriéger electric Victoria	Louis Antoine Kriéger / Fulmen	Kriéger Company of Electric Vehicles
1894	De Dion-Bouton electric tractor unit	De Dion-Bouton	De Dion-Bouton
1895	Arnold electric prototype	Bion J. Arnold	
1895	Barrows Electric Auto-Buggy	C. H. Barrows Electric Vehicle Company	
1895	Bogard electric dogcart	Bogard	
1895	Carpenter electric runabout	Hiram H. Carpenter	
1895	Dey–Griswold electric-hydraulic phaeton	Dey–Griswold & Company	
1895	Edison electric tricycle	Thomas Edison and staff	Thomas Edison
1895	Holtzer–Cabot electric break	Holtzer–Cabot Electric Company / Chauncey Thomas & Company	
1895	Perry Lewis electric wagon	J. D. Perry Lewis	
1895	Petter electric car	J. B. Petter & Sons	
1896	American Electric Mail Phaeton	American Electric Vehicle Company / C. E. Woods Company	American Electric (1899 automobile)
1896	Barrett–Perret electric prototype	Elektron Manufacturing Company / John Barrett and Frank A. Perret	
1896	Bersey Electric Cab	Electrical Vehicle Syndicate / London Electrical Cab Company	Bersey Electric Cab
1896	Britannia electric carriage	Britannia Electric Carriage Syndicate	
1896	Columbia Mk I electric prototype	Pope Manufacturing Company	Columbia (automobile brand)
1896	Electric Construction Company dogcart	Electric Construction Company / Thomas Hugh Parker	
1896	Electric Carriage & Wagon Company hansom cab	Electric Carriage & Wagon Company / Morris and Salom	Electric Vehicle Company
1896	Electric Motive Power carriage conversion	Electric Motive Power Company	Electric Motive Power
1896	Gladiator electric carriage	Gladiator Cycle Company	
1896	Packard electric tricycle	Lucius B. Packard	
1896	Thrupp & Maberly electric Victoria	Thrupp & Maberly	Thrupp & Maberly
1897	Anthony electric runabout	Earle C. Anthony	
1897	Blimline electric runabout	Sebastian Blimline	
1897	Bushbury Electric dogcart	Wearwell Motor Carriage Company / Electrical Construction Company	Bushbury Electric
1897	Cleveland/Sperry electric car	Elmer A. Sperry / Sperry Engineering Company	
1897	Eastman Electro Cycle	Eastman Automobile Company / Hector J. Hayes	
1897	Elieson “Swan” electric quadricycle	Elieson Lamina Accumulator Syndicate	
1897	General Electric Thomson–Lemp wagonette	General Electric / Elihu Thomson and James Lemp	General Electric
1897	Headland electric vehicles	Headland Patent Electric Storage Battery Company / James T. Robson	
1897	Jenatzy electric dos-à-dos	Jenatzy–Martini / Camille Jenatzy	Camille Jenatzy
1897	Woods electric car	Fischer Equipment Company / Clinton E. Woods	Woods Motor Vehicle
1898	Bouhey electric car	Société des Usines Bouhey	
1898	CFVE electric cab	Compagnie française des voitures électromobiles	
1898	Doré electric cab	Société G. Doré	
1898	Eaton electric delivery wagon	Eaton Electric Motor Carriage Company / Howard F. Eaton	
1898	Egger-Lohner C.2 Phaeton	Egger-Lohner / Ferdinand Porsche	Egger-Lohner C.2 Phaeton
1898	Fischer electric delivery wagon	Fischer Equipment Company	
1898	Fourgon Électrique fire engine	Paris Fire Brigade	
1898	General Electric Automobile Company vehicles	General Electric Automobile Company	
1898	International electric trucks	Société des Transports Automobiles	
1898	Kuhlstein electric car	Kuhlstein Wagenbau	
1898	Madelvic electric brougham	Madelvic Motor Carriage Company / William Peck	Madelvic Motor Carriage Company
1898	Mildé electric vehicles	Mildé & Company / Charles Mildé	
1898	Oppermann electric car	Carl Oppermann	Oppermann Automobiles
1898	Warner electric runabout	Lewis E. Warner	
1898	Waverley electric car	Indiana Bicycle Company	Pope-Waverley
1899	Aluminum electric car	Aluminum Motor Vehicle Company	
1899	Amesbury electric prototype	Amesbury Automobile Company / C. J. Bagley	
1899	Averley electric car	G. Averley	
1899	Bailey electric prototype	S. R. Bailey & Company / Walter Baird	
1899	Baker electric prototype	Baker Electric Car Company / Walter C. Baker	Baker Motor Vehicle
1899	Barnes electric runabout	Barnes Cycle Company / William Van Wagoner	
1899	BGS electric trap	Société de la voiture BGS	Bouquet, Garcin & Schivre
1899	Binney & Burnham electric car	Binney & Burnham	
1899	Cambier electric dogcart	Cambier & Company	
1899	Champion electric delivery truck	McCrea Motor Truck Company	
1899	Chapman “Sulky Electromobile”	William H. Chapman / Belknap Motor Company	
1899	Clift electric Victoria	Sinclair Motor Works / Frederick Clift	
1899	Collins electric vehicle	Collins Electric Vehicle Company / Patrick J. Collins	
1899	Electra electric car	H. Krugen	
1899	Electrical Undertakings electric tonneau	Electrical Undertakings Limited	
1899	Fiedler electric car	Berliner Elektromobil- und Accumulatoren-Gesellschaft	
1899	Foster electric cars	Foster & Company	
1899	Hautier electric car	Société Hautier	
1899	Helvetia electric car	Compagnie des Voitures Electriques Helvetia	
1899	Henschel electric car and cab	Berliner Maschinenfabrik Henschel & Company	
1899	Hub electric break	Hub Motor Transit Company / Fred Newman and Josef Ledwinka	
1899	La Jamais Contente	Compagnie Internationale des Transports Automobiles Électriques / Camille Jenatzy	La Jamais Contente
1899	Keating Delivery Auto	Keating Wheel & Automobile Company	
1899	Kennedy electric runabout	Electric Power Development Company / Charles W. Kennedy	
1899	Kensington electric runabout	Kensington Automobile Manufacturing Company	
1899	Monnard electric dogcart	Monnard	Monnard
1899	Quinby electric carriage	J. M. Quinby & Company / Henry Leitner	Quinby (automobile)
1899	Scheele electric car	Kölner Elektromobile-Gesellschaft	
1899	Schuckert electric car	Elektrizitäts-Aktiengesellschaft vormals Schuckert & Company	
1899	Syracuse/Van Wagoner electric runabout	Syracuse Automobile Company / William Van Wagoner	
1899	Turinelli & Pezza electric car	Turinelli & Pezza	Turinelli & Pezza
1899	US Automobile electric car	United States Automobile Company	US Automobile
1899	Vedovelli–Priestley electric tricycle and cab	Société Vedovelli Priestley et Cie	
1899	Vulkan electric car	Vulkan Automobilgesellschaft	

== Exclusions and classification notes ==
- Armstrong Electric is excluded because its petrol engine drove a dynamo that supplied an electric traction system; it was a gasoline–electric hybrid rather than a battery-only electric vehicle.
- History of the electric vehicle is an overview article, not a vehicle.
- A company incorporation or a proposal to manufacture electric vehicles is not sufficient for inclusion. A completed prototype, public demonstration or production vehicle must be documented.
- The Lohner-Porsche mixed petrol–electric vehicles are excluded as hybrids; the battery-electric Egger-Lohner C.2 Phaeton is included.
- Vehicles drawing power continuously from overhead wires or rails are outside the scope of this road-vehicle list.

== See also ==
- Category:Electric vehicles introduced in the 19th century
- Category:Electric vehicles introduced in the 20th century
- History of the electric vehicle
- List of production battery electric vehicles
- Electric vehicles introduced in the 20th century
- Electric vehicles introduced in the 21st century
