= American Electric =

American Electric may refer to:

- American Electric (1899 automobile)
- American Electric (1913 automobile)
- American Electric Power, a major investor-owner electric utility in various parts of the US
- American Electric Corporation, a company that manufactured electronic appliances and devices in Culver City, California
