= Michael Radcliffe Ward =

English electrical engineer

Michael Radcliffe Ward (c. 1859, Alderley - ) was an English electrical engineer and automotive pioneer. After making engineering innovation in electric lighting, he went on to develop electric buses.

By 1879, Radcliffe Ward was working for the British Electric Light Company. In 1881, he designed a Gramme machine which could power 4 to 6 arc lights of 4000 nominal candle power per light. In February of that year, he ran some experiments at George's Pier Head, Liverpool along with Alderman Joseph Hubback, chairman of the light company. They used one of the Gramme machines along with a multi-tubular boiler and vertical engine supplied by Cochrane and Co. The light produced was more effective in penetrating the fog than the pre-existing gas lights.

In 1882, Radcliffe Ward was named as the electrical engineer working for the Faure Electric Accumulator Company, working with consultants William Edward Ayrton and Camille Alphonse Faure. In 1883 the Electrical Power Storage Co. (E.P.S.), with whose accumulators Radcliffe Ward subsequently worked, acquired the Faure patent.

In 1886 he produced a two-speed electrical cab which he ran in Brighton, where Magnus Volk had built Volk's Electric Railway in 1883 and ran an electric dogcart. In 1888 a syndicate, the Ward Company, was formed to develop electric traction. Under its manager, C.H.Yeaman, it built an electric bus which was run for 500 miles in London under license.

In 1893 the Ward Electrical Car Company Ltd exhibited at the World's Columbian Exposition in Chicago, USA.

In 1894 Walter Bersey designed a second bus for the syndicate and a parcel van. The bus weighed 3½ tons, of which 1 ton 7cwt was the 56 E.P.S. cells which delivered 40 amps for three hours. It was powered by two 2½ hp Crompton motors and was reported to have run 3,000 - 4,000 miles in London by August 1894. Ward also ran an electric cab in London at this time.

In May 1896, as the Locomotives on Highways Bill was making its way through Parliament, the London Electrical Omnibus Company offered £170,000 of shares to the public (out of a total share capital of £250,000) to manufacture and run 125 of Radcliffe Ward's buses On 20 December 1896 Radcliffe Ward's bus ran on London's streets for the first time under the London Electrical Omnibus Company. By March 1897 the Company still had only one bus on the streets but was seeking a further £50,000 working capital. In December 1897 there was a meeting of shareholders at which it was reported that not one bus was running. The company continued in existence until an Extraordinary General Meeting on 30 January 1901 when a liquidator was appointed. A final meeting of the shareholders was held on 13 March 1902 to receive the liquidator's report.
