= Walter Bersey =

British electrical engineer

Walter Charles Bersey (15 October 1874 – 21 April 1950) was a British electrical engineer who developed electric-driven vehicles in the late 19th century. He developed a new form of dry battery that enabled him in 1888 to design an electric bus which was built by Radcliffe Ward. A second bus designed by Bersey and built by Ward ran in London for at least 3,000 miles (4,800 km). In March 1894 he built an electric parcel van that was used in central London and later developed electric cars. Bersey also developed an electric cab design, 75 of which were built and used by the London Electrical Cab Company to run a service between 1897 and 1899. They were not financially successful owing to noise and vibration leading to excessive damage to tyres and batteries. In his later career Bersey developed designs for internal combustion engine cars and during the First World War served with the Royal Flying Corps and Royal Air Force.

== Early life and inventing career ==
Bersey was born on 15 October 1874. He studied at the Finsbury College of Engineering, attending courses given by physicist and electrical engineer Silvanus P. Thompson.

Early in life he developed a new type of dry battery that allowed him to design an electric bus which was built in 1888 by Radcliffe Ward's Ward Electric Car Company. By mid-August 1894 a second bus which he had designed for Ward was reported to have run successfully in London over a distance of 3,000–4,000 miles (4,800–6,400 km). In March of that year Bersey had developed an electric parcel van for use in the City of London. This had an effective range of 25–50 miles (40–80 km) and running costs said to be half that of a horse-drawn van. The prototype covered 1,000 miles (1,600 km) in the following 11 months and was well received in the press; though it was derided as dangerous by crossing sweepers, bus and cab drivers.

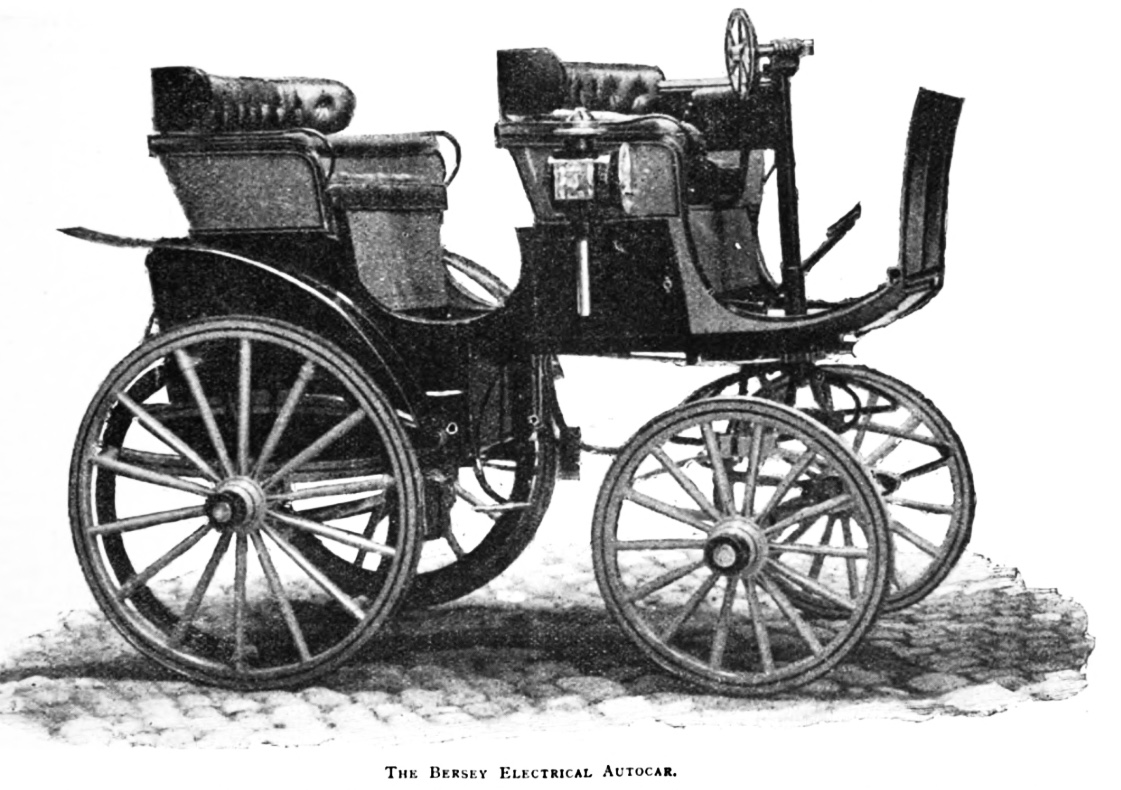
Bersey Electric Car exhibited in1896

Bersey constructed his first electric car in 1895; this was a two-motor chain-driven design with a 2-speed clutch gearbox. Bersey exhibited an electric phaeton at the International Horseless Carriage Exhibition at the Imperial Institute on 15 May 1896. It was described as "smooth but slow". Bersey designed a number of such electric vehicles for the private motorist, though none survived to the modern day. Bersey noted at the time that "there is no apparent limit to the hopes and expectations of the electric artisans…..in short [it] is the natural power which shall be the most intimate and effective of all man's assets".

Bersey became an Associate Member of the Institution of Electrical Engineers in December 1895 and in 1898 he issued a publication entitled ‘Electrically Propelled Carriages’ which featured several electrically propelled carriages, designed by Bersey and as well as carriages by other manufacturers.

The restrictive Locomotive Acts limited self-propelled road-going vehicles to 2 mph in towns and 4 mph in the countryside. They addressed public concern about the noise, smoke, fire and size of steam-powered traction engines and the alarm they caused to people and horses. Electric vehicles were silent and looked like horse-drawn vehicles without the horses. After many years in which the police took no action against them, in 1896 with legislation passing through Parliament to relax the Locomotive Acts, enforcement was stepped up and Bersey was issued with at least two summonses. In May 1896 he was fined £2 plus costs for driving on Parliament Street, London, in excess of the speed limit. The Locomotives on Highways Act 1896 was enacted in August 1896 and freed vehicles of less than three tons from the restrictions. It did not come into effect until 14 November 1896; meanwhile the restrictions were enforced rigorously and Bersey was issued with his final summons on 27 October 1896.

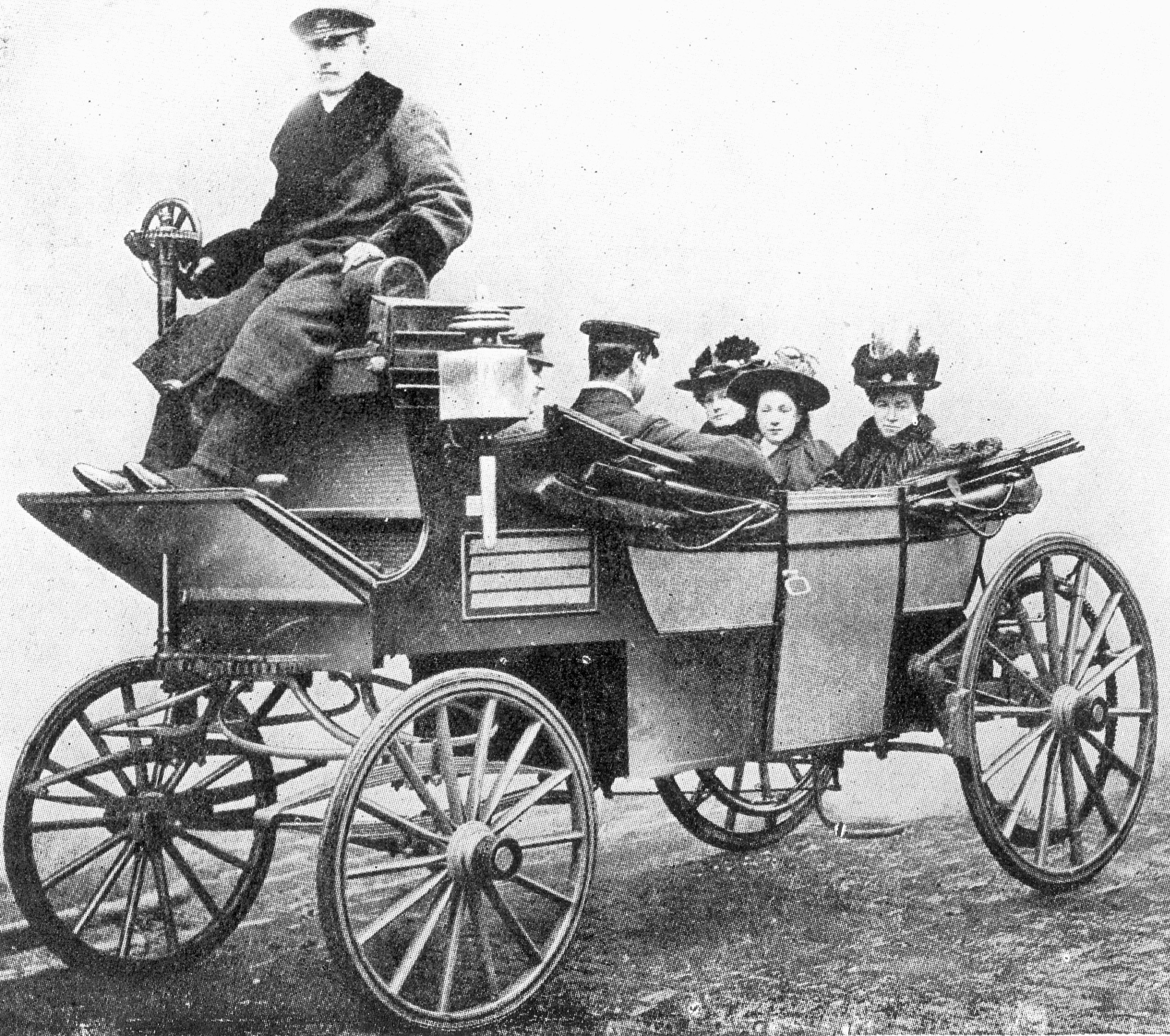
Walter Bersey on his Electric Landau, which took part in the Emancipation Run, 14 November 1896

Bersey's electric landau took part in the 14 November 1896 London to Brighton emancipation run but had to travel part of the way by rail as the distance exceeded the vehicle's range. At around this time Bersey predicted that "whilst petroleum may become the motive power in country districts, and steam will probably be used for very heavy vehicles, there is no doubt that electricity will be the most advantageous where the traffic can be located within a radius".

== Bersey electric cab ==
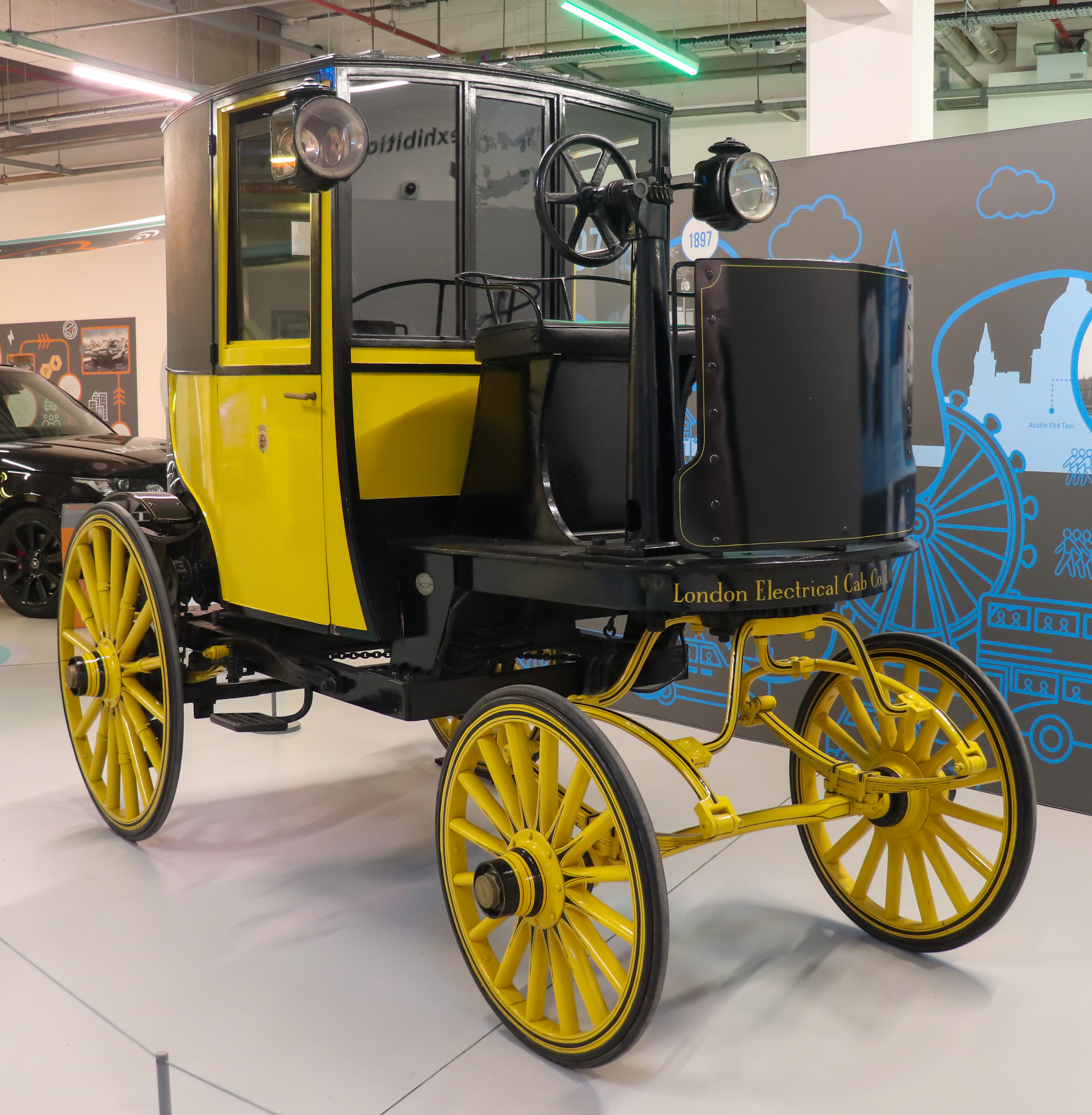
1897 Bersey Electrical Cab at the British Motor Museum without its batteries, which were in a tray beneath the vehicle.

In 1896 Bersey developed an electric cab, intended for use in central London. The cab was exhibited at a South Kensington motor show. A batch of 12 cabs entered service for the London Electrical Cab Company on 19 August 1897. The cabs, which charged the same rate as the horse-drawn alternative, proved popular and the fleet expanded to 75 vehicles. The batteries were carried in a tray beneath the vehicle and it was claimed that a depleted set could be replaced with a fully-charged set in five minutes.

However, the heavy weight of the vehicle's batteries caused excessive tyre wear, vibration and increased noise. The vibration damaged the delicate glass plate batteries and the cost of replacements for these and the solid rubber tyres caused the company to report a loss of £6,200 in its first year. The cabs were withdrawn from service and the company closed in August 1899 and was liquidated. At that time 36 complete cabs were offered for sale and 41 incomplete.

== Later career ==
In his later career Bersey switched to designing and selling internal combustion engine cars. His firm of W C Bersey & Co of Hythe Road, Willesden, Middlesex, went into liquidation on 4 January 1900. He then entered into a partnership with Augustus Sebastian Pereno as a motor dealer in Long Acre, London, which lasted until 24 February 1903. A subsequent partnership with Percy Lloyd Hanmer Dodson, again as motor dealers, at Copthall Avenue, London, was dissolved on 5 October 1903. Some of his patents were later acquired by Harry John Lawson's The Great Horseless Carriage Company.

During the First World War Bersey was appointed a second lieutenant in the Royal Flying Corps on 29 October 1917. He was confirmed in rank as a 2nd class equipment officer on 29 November 1917 and on 15 March 1918 was appointed to the temporary rank of lieutenant-colonel whilst on special employment. Bersey transferred to the Royal Air Force upon its foundation on 1 April 1918 and was appointed a 1st class staff officer. He relinquished his rank on 30 September 1918 and was appointed a temporary major in the administrative branch; he ceased to be employed on 25 April 1919 after the war had ended.

Bersey died on 21 April 1950, by which point he was living at Sandbanks, Bournemouth, and left an estate valued at around £9,800.
