= Faure Electric Accumulator Company =

British battery manufacturing company from 1881-1883

- Company type: Private company
- Industry: Electrical
- Founded: 1881; 144 years ago
- Defunct: c. 1883
- Fate: Patents acquired by rival company
- Successor: Electrical Power Storage Co
- Headquarters: London, United Kingdom
- Key people: Lord Kelvin (promotor) William Edward Ayrton, Radcliffe Ward and John Perry (electrical engineers)
- Products: Electric batteries

The Faure Electric Accumulator Company (FEAC) was a British company founded in 1881 in London to supply electric batteries suitable for lighting and other purposes. It took its name from the French chemical engineer Camille Alphonse Faure. Lord Kelvin wrote a favourable review for Faure's new battery design that appeared in The Times. However he did not play a formal role in the company.

== History ==
Despite Lord Kelvin's optimism, various shortcomings in Faure design became apparent. In particular the lead paste applied to the lead plate in Faure's design became unstuck. Soon a revised version, the Faure-Sellon-Volckmar accumulator was considered an improvement. However this created a problem as regards the management of patents.

Almost immediately the Electrical Power Storage Company (EPS) was founded in 1882 and threatened the FEAC with a lawsuit over the patents. By 1883 EPS had acquired the relevant patents and became the first manufacturer of electric batteries in the world.

== Appointments ==
The directors were:

- Arthur Otway
- Charles Clifford
- Charles Seymour Grenfell
- Samuel Mendel
- Harvey Ranking

The electrical engineers were:

- William Edward Ayrton (consultant)
- Camille Alphonse Faure (consultant)
- Michael Radcliffe Ward

The solicitors were Freshfield and Williams.
