= Argo Electric =

Defunct American motor vehicle manufacturer

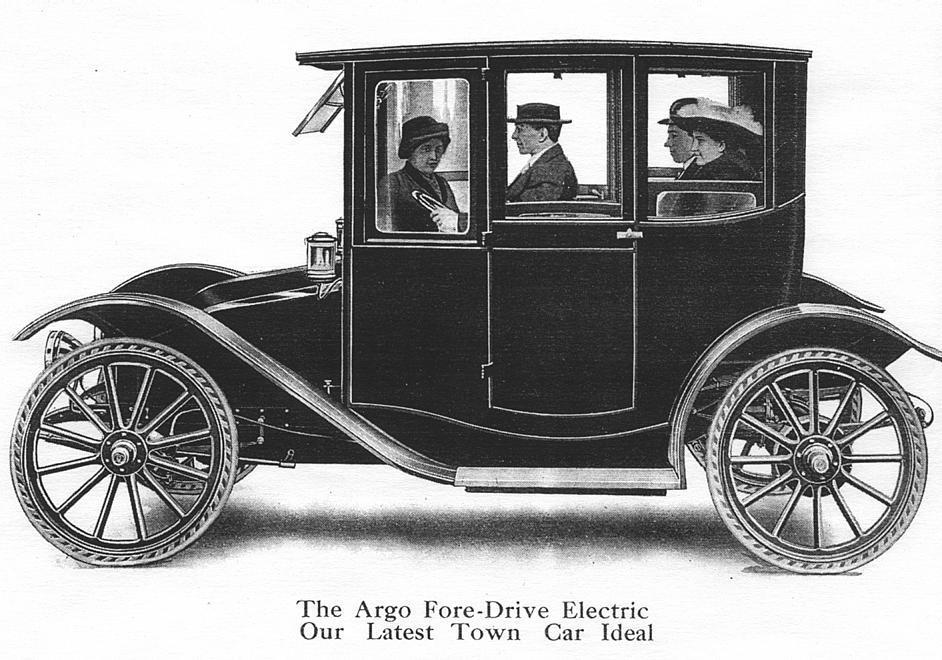
1912 Argo Brougham

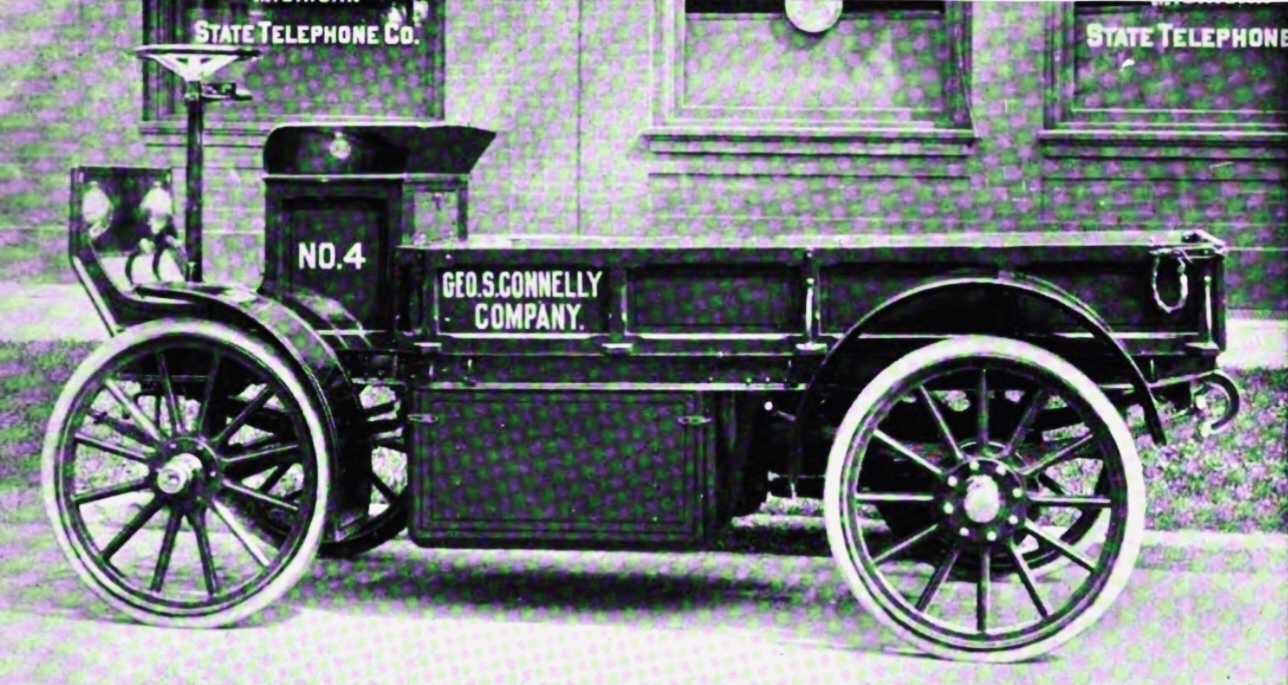
Argo K-20 1t (1914)

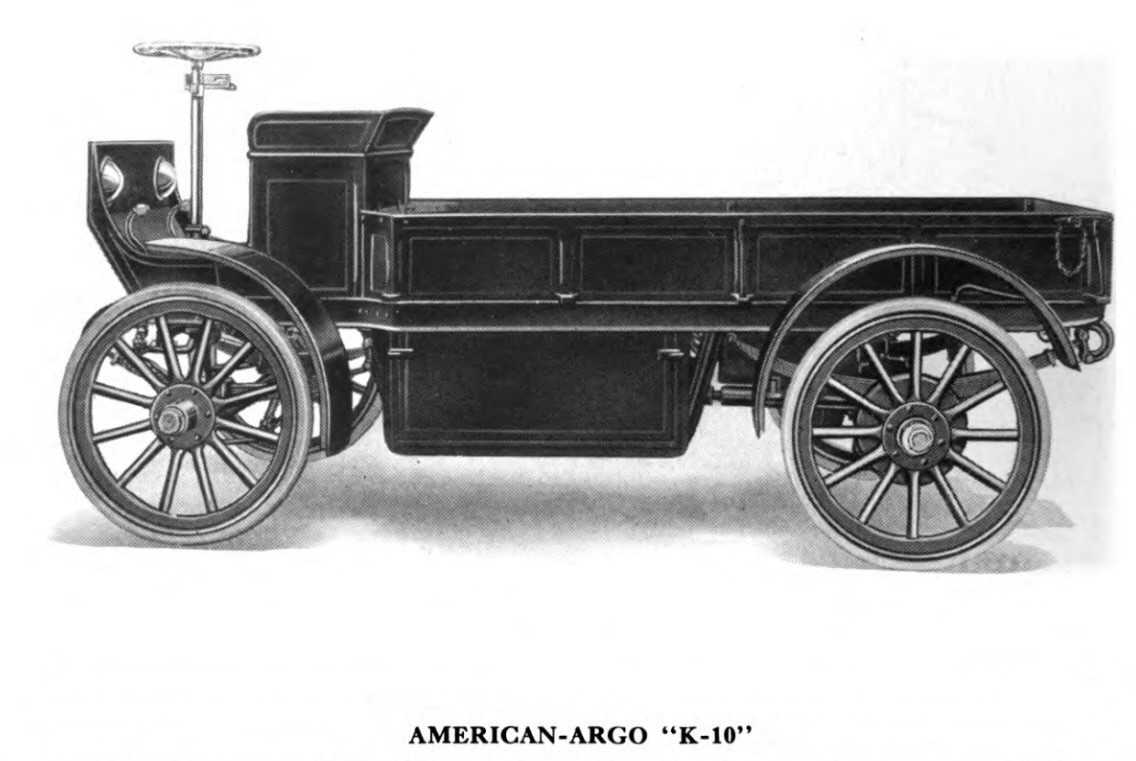
Argo Model K-10 (1915) 0,5 to

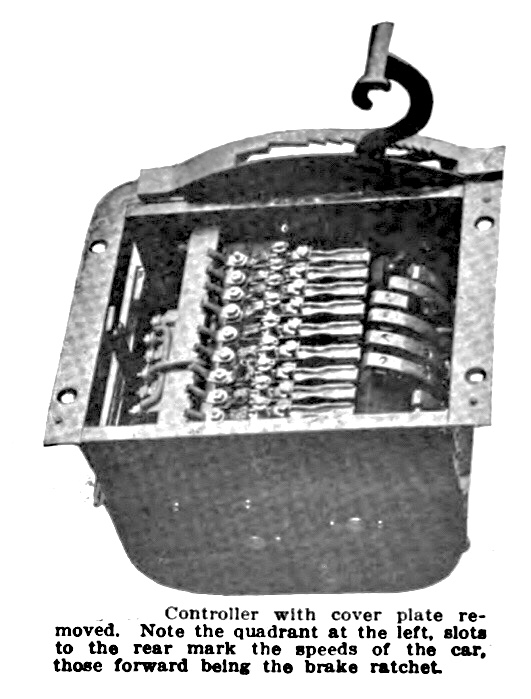
Argo Electric speed controler (1912)

The Argo Electric Vehicle Company was an American electric automobile manufacturer that operated in Saginaw, Michigan, from 1912 to 1916. The Argo Electric used a 60 volt system with Westinghouse motors. They claimed to be capable of 20 mph (32 km/h). It had 6 forward and 6 reverse speeds, had 36 × 4 cushion tires and used an 18-inch (457 mm) steering wheel on the left. They were offered in both four- and five-passenger models, with open and closed versions available, and all models used steering wheels. The 110-inch (2,794 mm) wheelbase was the longest of any electric at the time. The Argo Brougham was a 4-passenger car, weighing 3,200 lb (1,451 kg), claimed a range of 75 miles (121 km) per charge using thirty 190 ah, MV Exide batteries.

By 1914 Argo joined with the Broc and Borland Electric vehicle companies to form the American Electric Car Company. Three different models were marketed. In 1916 the Columbia Motors Company purchased the assets of Argo.

== See also ==
- Brass Era car
- History of the electric vehicle
