= Oppermann Automobiles =

Brand

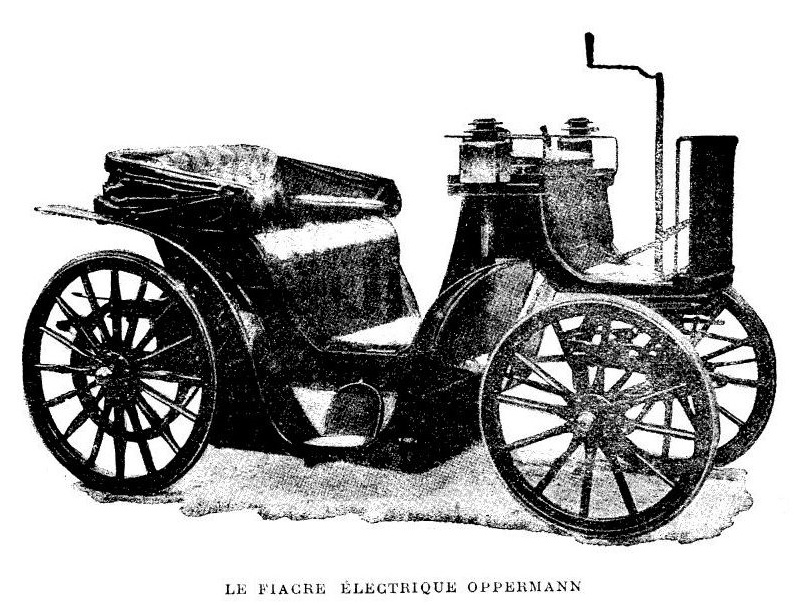
Oppermann electric (1898)

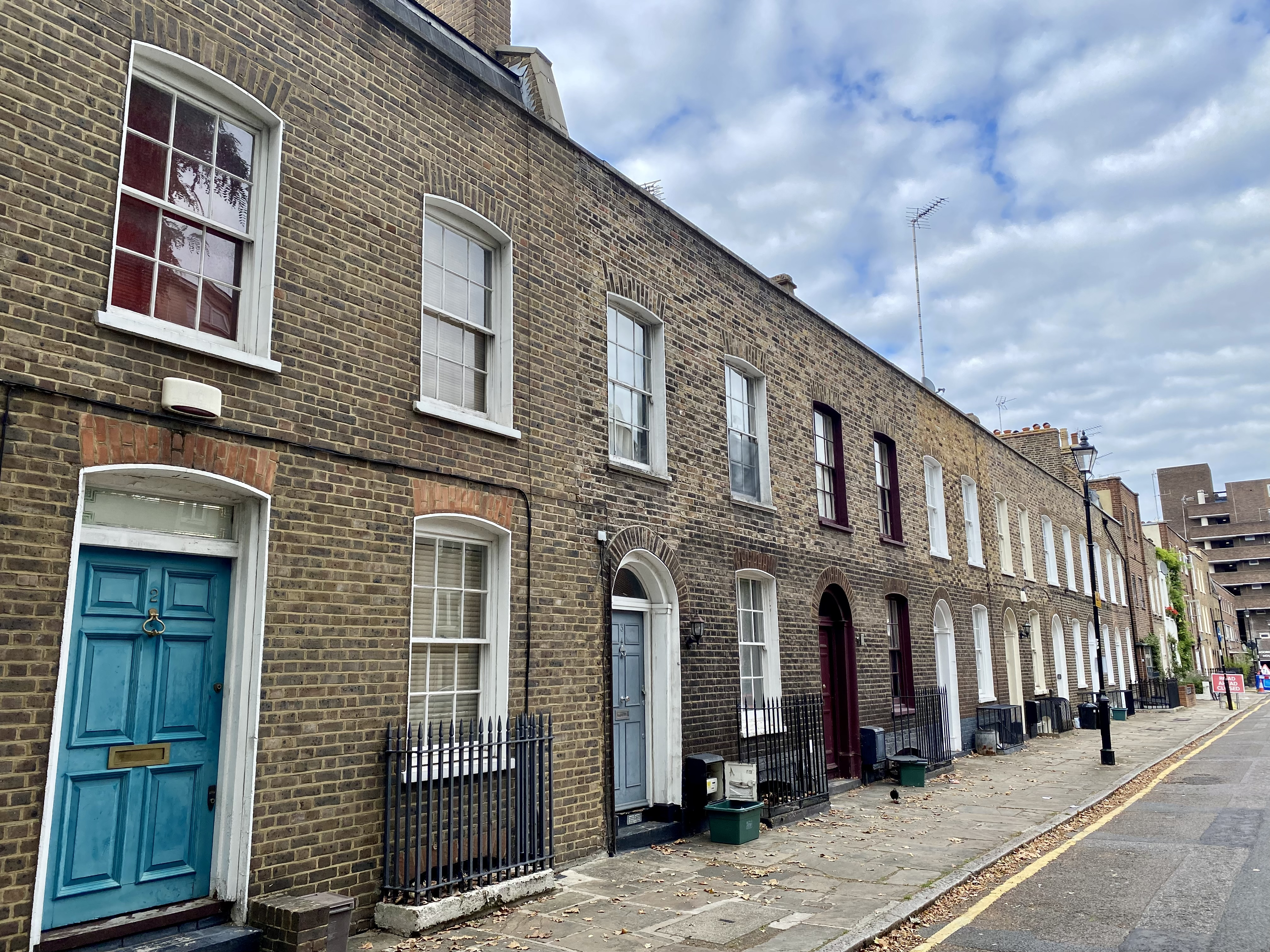
2 Wynyatt Street (blue front door)

Carl Oppermann produced electric cars under his own name from 1898 to 1902, and through Carl Oppermann Electric Carriage Co. Ltd. from 1902 to 1907. His firm made its own batteries to power a variety of vehicles mostly having open body styles, and produced a number of electric taxis. The King of Siam purchased an Oppermann electric in 1905.

Carl Johann David Oppermann was born on 11 April 1838 in Hamburg, Germany. By about 1862 he had established himself as a watch manufacturer and mechanical engineer in Clerkenwell, workshop at Wynatt Street no. 2 London, UK. He died at Barnet, Middlesex, England on 30 April 1916 and was survived by his wife Elizabeth Jane née Tunstill (30 May 1843 – 1 August 1934) and their numerous children including their son Carl Tunstill John Oppermann (born 13 March 1861).

== technical data ==
The battery consists of forty-two cells developed in-house and hangs under the frame of the carriage. The weight of the battery is given as only about 3.5 hundredweight. The capacity was sufficient for a drive in cities of about sixty miles. In the manufacture of the accumulators, he mixed in animal hair and wool in very small quantities to obtain a very porous lead plate through flocculation during frequent charging and discharging. He had documented this in a German Reich patent. (D.R.P Nr.189.175) The motor, with a continuous power of 3 HP = 2200 watts, can operate up to 7 HP = 5100 watts. The motor is located at the rear of the vehicle under the passengers' seat. The power is transmitted to a differential gearbox and from there via chains to the rear wheels. All movements—starting and stopping, reversing the engine, and operating the electric brake—are controlled by a single lever. There are three forward speeds, and the top speed of the Victoria is eleven miles per hour. In addition to the electric brake, band brakes are present on the rear wheel drums, which are operated by a foot pedal. The weight of the Victoria is 23 cwt. = 1045 kg. Mr. Oppermann had received an order from Vienna for the delivery of fifty of his electric vehicles. These cars were equipped with a standard tubular frame that supported the engine and transmission, etc., so that any type of body could be fitted.
