= Armstrong Electric =

Defunct American motor vehicle manufacturer

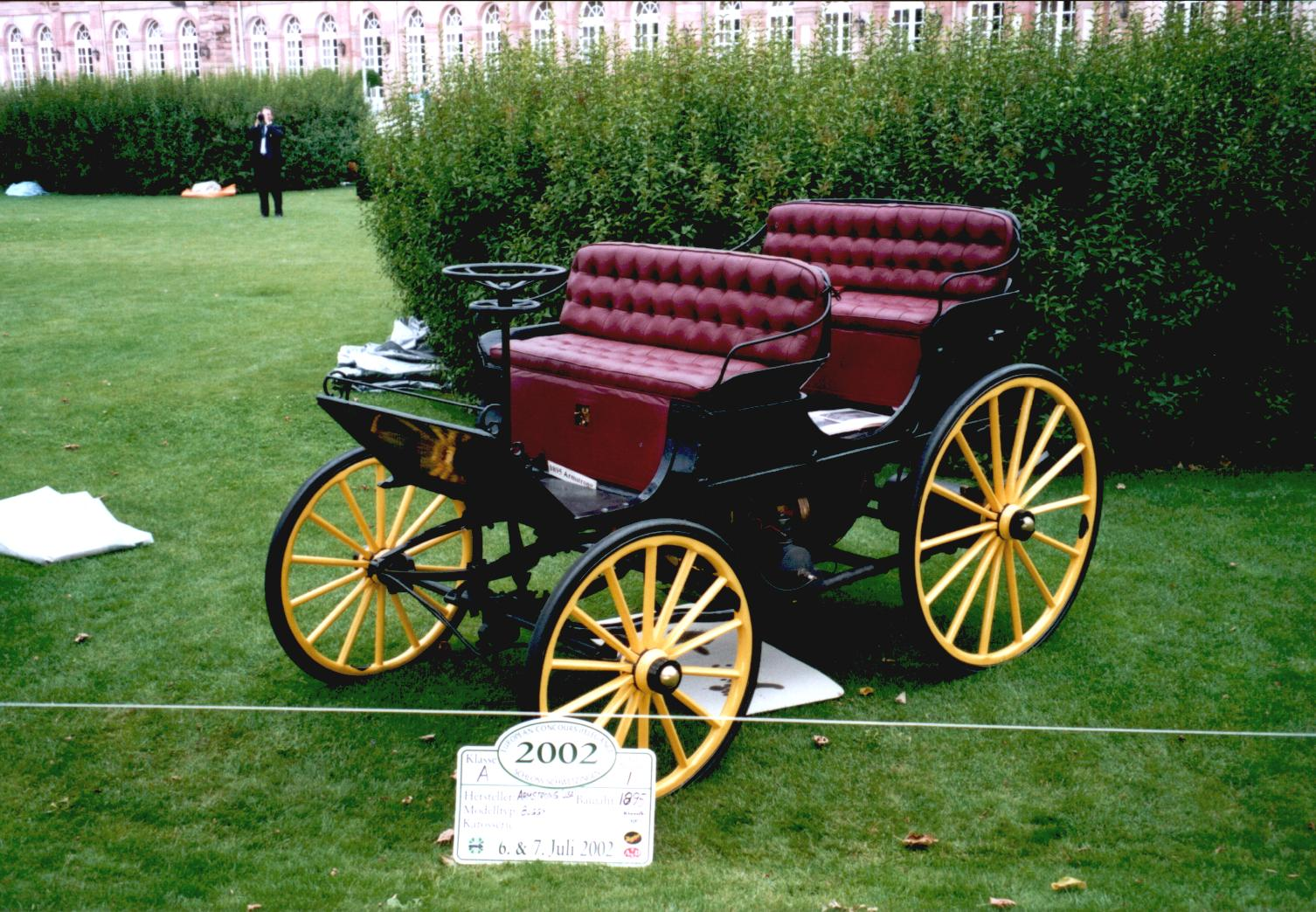
1896 Armstrong Doppelphaeton

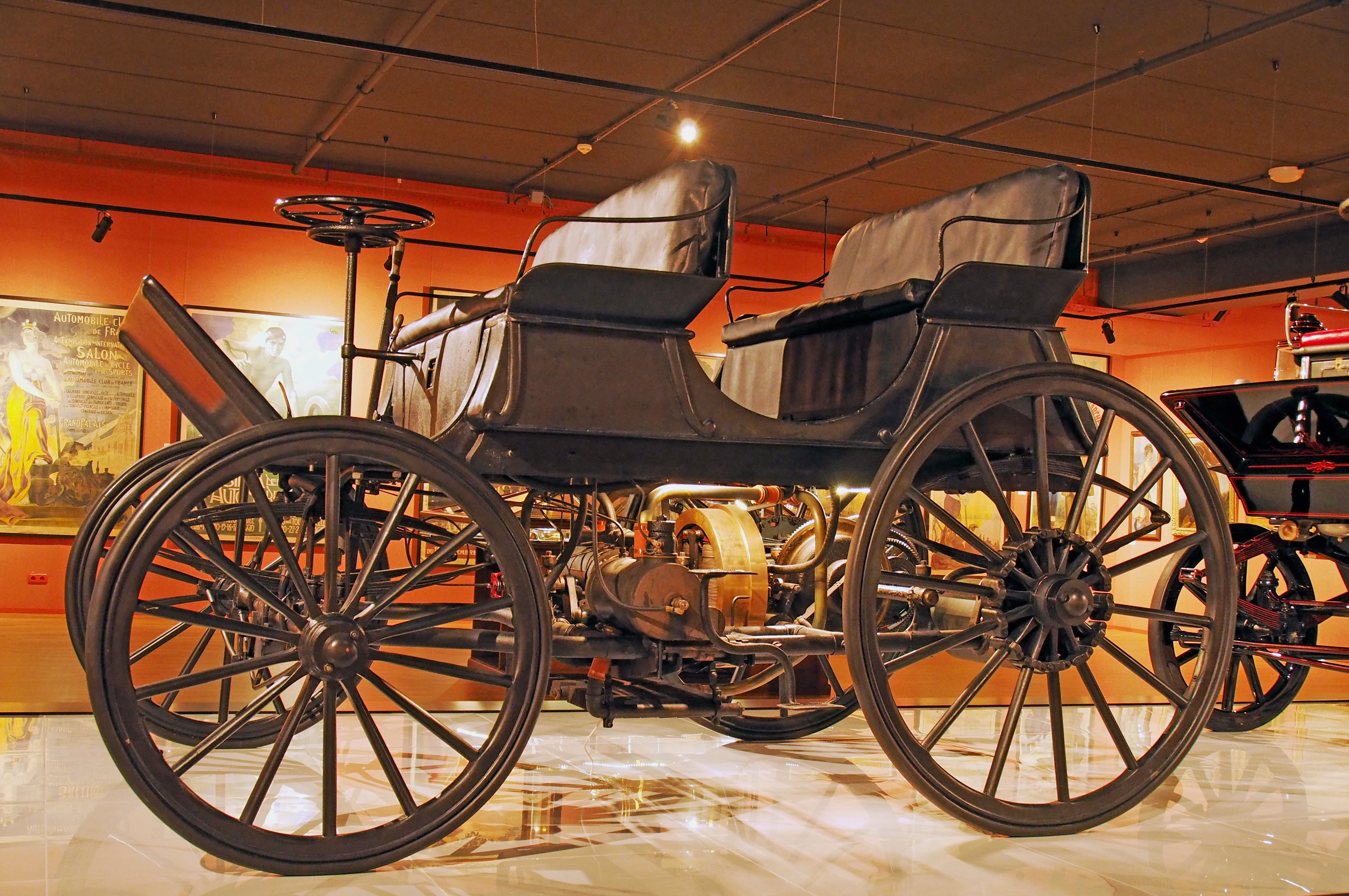
1896 Armstrong Petrol-Electric Hybrid in the Den Haag Louwman Museum

Armstrong Electric was a manufacturer of electric automobiles in Bridgeport, Connecticut. The company was founded by inventor, William Armstrong, and produced cars from 1885 through 1902.

== Present day ==
It was reported that the Maple Street factory used by Armstrong to build its first car could be used again used for automobile manufacture by AC Cars.

The original car has recently been rebuilt in England, and has run for the first time in over 100 years. It is currently on show in a Victorian vehicle collection at a Sussex country park.

https://www.hemmings.com/blog/2016/03/14/perhaps-the-worlds-first-hybrid-an-1896-armstrong-sells-for-483400-at-amelia-island/
