= Monnard =

The Monnard was a French automobile manufactured only in 1899. It was a light four-seater electric dogcart.
