= Turinelli & Pezza =

Italian electric car

The Turinelli & Pezza was an Italian electric car manufactured only in 1899. Manufactured in Milan, it featured front wheel drive.
