= Riker Electric Vehicle Company =

Defunct American motor vehicle manufacturer

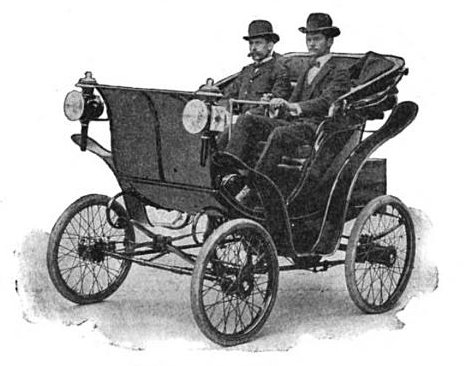
- Ad for Riker Electric Victoria, 1900
- Industry: Automotive
- Predecessor: Riker Electric Motor Company
- Founded: 1898; 128 years ago
- Founder: Andrew L. Riker
- Defunct: 1901; 125 years ago
- Fate: Absorbed by Electric Vehicle Company
- Successor: Riker Motor Vehicle Company
- Headquarters: Elizabeth, New Jersey, United States
- Products: Electric vehicles
- Production output: unknown (1898-1901)

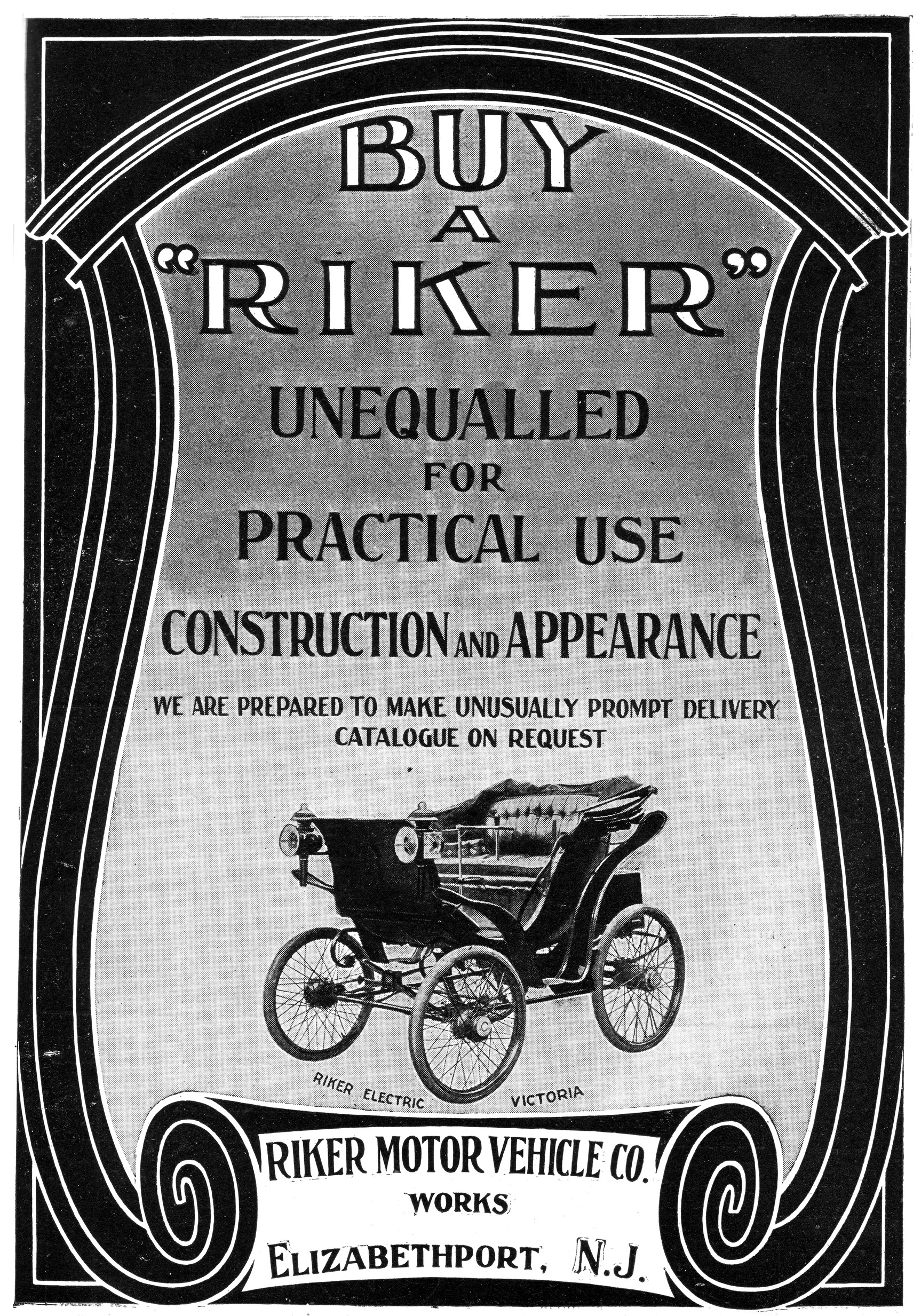
1900 Riker Motor Vehicle Co. advertisement

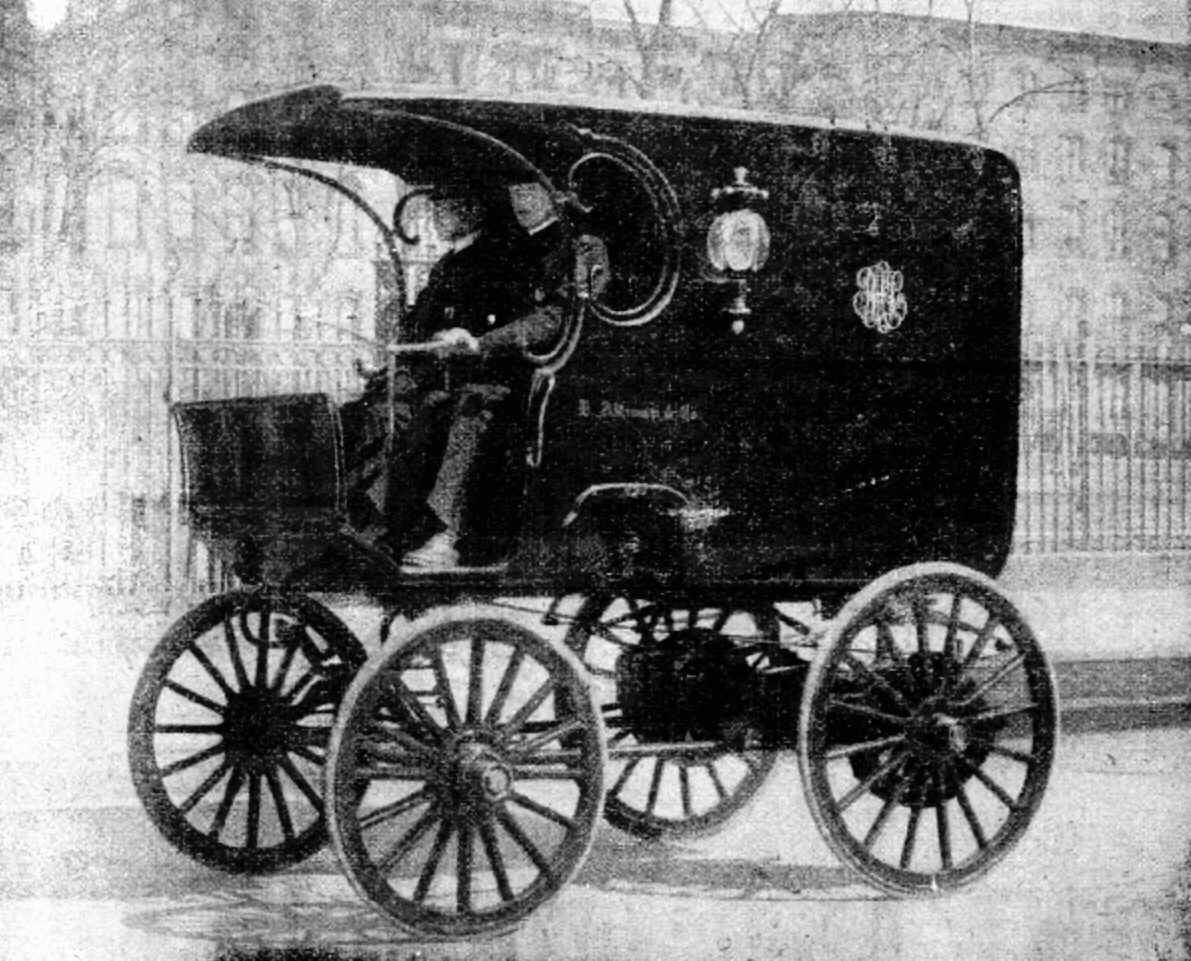
Riker (1899)

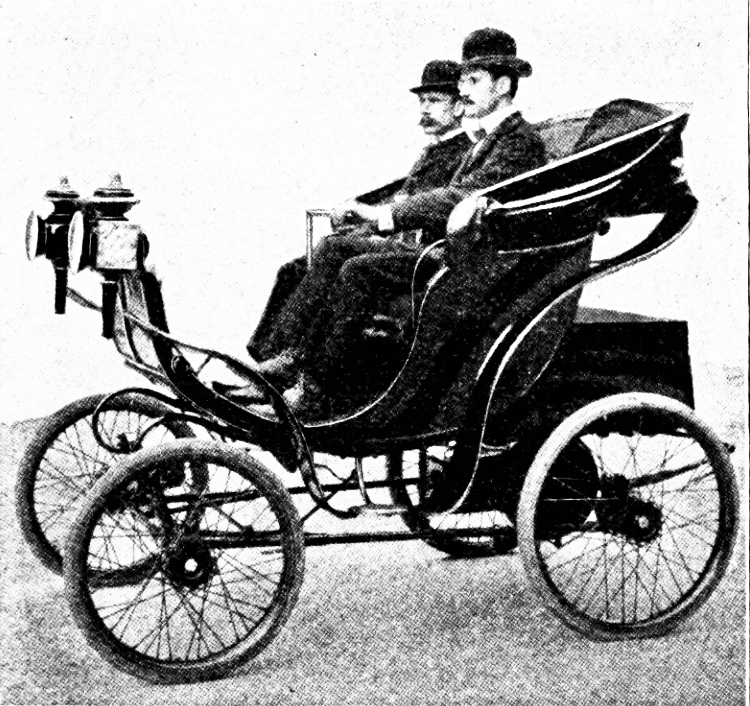
Riker Electric Vehicle Company (1900)

The Riker was a veteran and brass era electric car founded in 1898 in Elizabeth, New Jersey. Designed by Andrew L. Riker, they were built in small numbers until the company was absorbed by the Electric Vehicle Company in 1901.

== History ==
Andrew Riker built his first vehicle in 1887. It was an English Coventry tricycle with electric power. He founded the Riker Electric Motor Company in Brooklyn in 1888. In 1894 he built his first four-wheel car by putting a pair of Remington bicycles together with electric power added. That year he also began building an electric racer which competed against gasoline cars at the 1896 Narragansett Park race in Rhode Island.

Scientific American reported the Riker Electric Motor Company, of Brooklyn, N. Y., as the winner of the horseless carriage race, the prize being $900. The fastest mile was made by the Riker, "the time being 2:13." This was the first automobile race done around a track in the United States.

Riker made his first sale in 1897. From that time a variety of electric vehicles bore the Riker name including runabouts, Victorias, surreys, hansom cabs and heavy trucks. In December 1900 he merged his company with the Electric Vehicle Company and only trucks were built under the Riker name afterwards.

In 1901 as Riker Motor Vehicle Company, he designed an 8-hp 2-cylinder gasoline car, and a 16-hp 4-cylinder car which he offered to the Electric Vehicle Company, but they declined it. He partnered with the Overman Company to produce the gasoline cars in Chicopee Falls. Overman merged with Locomobile Company of America and in 1903 these became the first gasoline automobiles offered by Locomobile.

Andrew Riker became a vice-president for Locomobile and was the first president of the Society of Automotive Engineers.

== See also ==
- History of the electric vehicle
