= Bouquet, Garcin & Schivre =

The Bouquet, Garcin & Schivre (also known as the BGS) was a French electric car manufactured between 1899 and 1906. It could cover up to 60 miles (97 km) on one charge of its 770-pound (349 kg) battery pack; its top speed was 15 mph (24 km/h).
