= American Electric (1913 automobile) =

Defunct American motor vehicle manufacturer

American Electric was a short-lived American automobile manufacturer that built cars from 1913 to 1914. It was an amalgamation of three electric car companies: Argo Electric, Borland Electric, and Broc Electric.
