= Electrobat =

Defunct American motor vehicle manufacturer

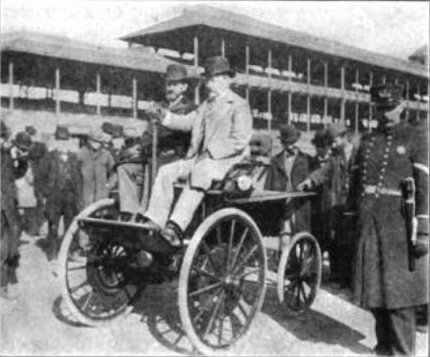
Morris and Salom in the 1894 Electrobat

The Electrobat was one of the first electric automobiles. It was designed and built in 1894 by mechanical engineer Henry G. Morris and chemist Pedro G. Salom in Philadelphia, Pennsylvania.

== History ==
Morris and Salom had backgrounds in battery-powered streetcars and, as the battery streetcar business was fading, they teamed up to make battery road vehicles. Their Electrobat received a patent on August 31, 1894. Built like a small version of a battery streetcar, it was a slow, heavy, impractical vehicle with steel tires to support its immense, 1,600-pound lead battery. An improved version, the Electrobat II, entered production in 1895.

In 1896, the pair founded the Morris & Salom Electric Carriage and Wagon Company.

Subsequent versions were lighter and had pneumatic tires, with bodies built at the Caffrey Carriage Company in Camden, New Jersey. These cars steered by their rear wheels and had two 1.5-horsepower (1.1 kW) motors that propelled them 25 miles (40 km) per charge at 20 mph (32 km/h). Morris and Salom went on to build about a dozen Hansom cabs based on this vehicle, to compete with the horse-drawn cabs then in service in New York City; they operated in New York, Boston, and elsewhere.

In 1897, they sold the cabs and their concept to Isaac L. Rice, who reincorporated the enterprise as the Electric Vehicle Company, which later became part of Albert Augustus Pope's empire.

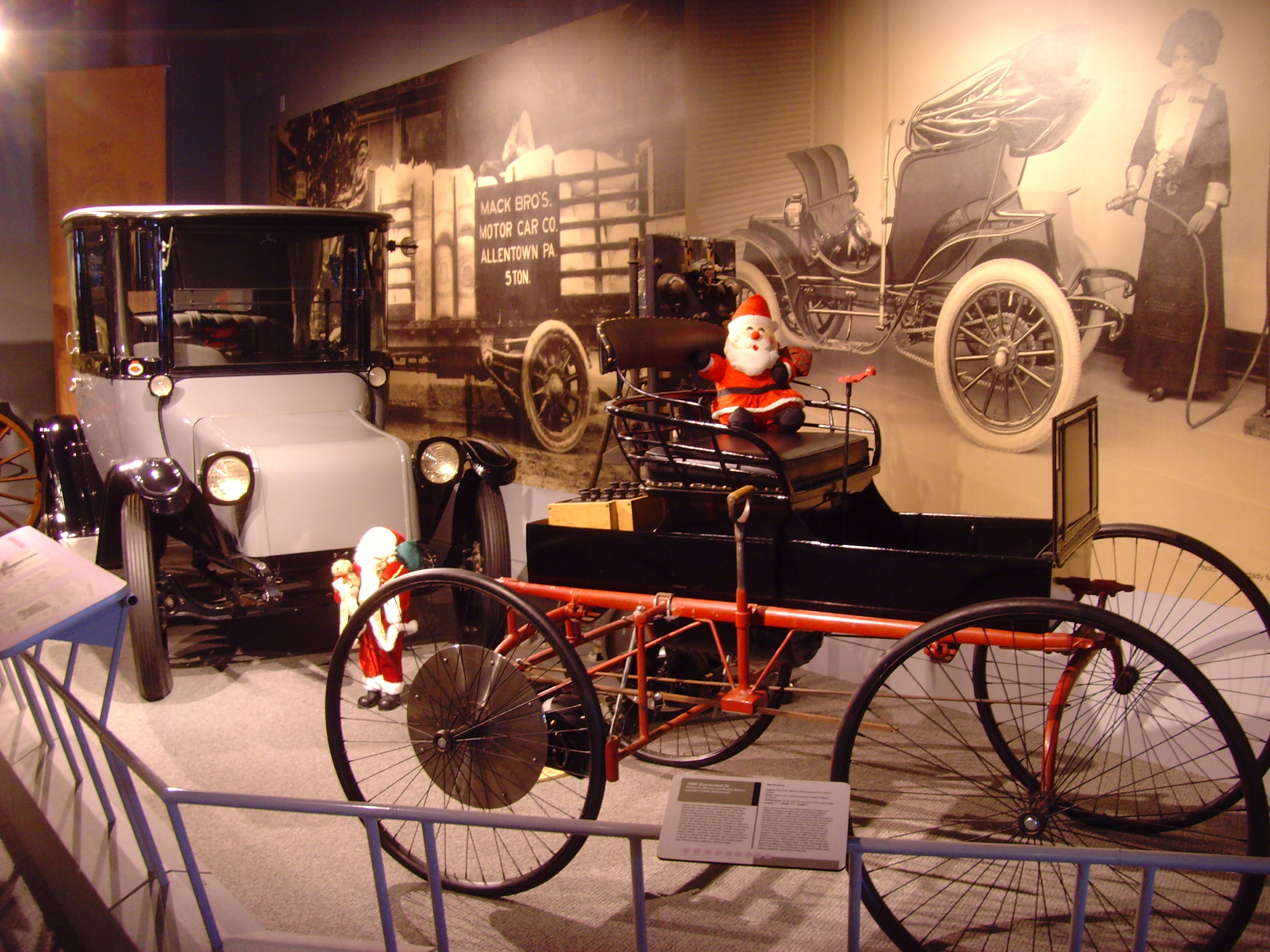
Morris & Salom 1895 Electrobat IV

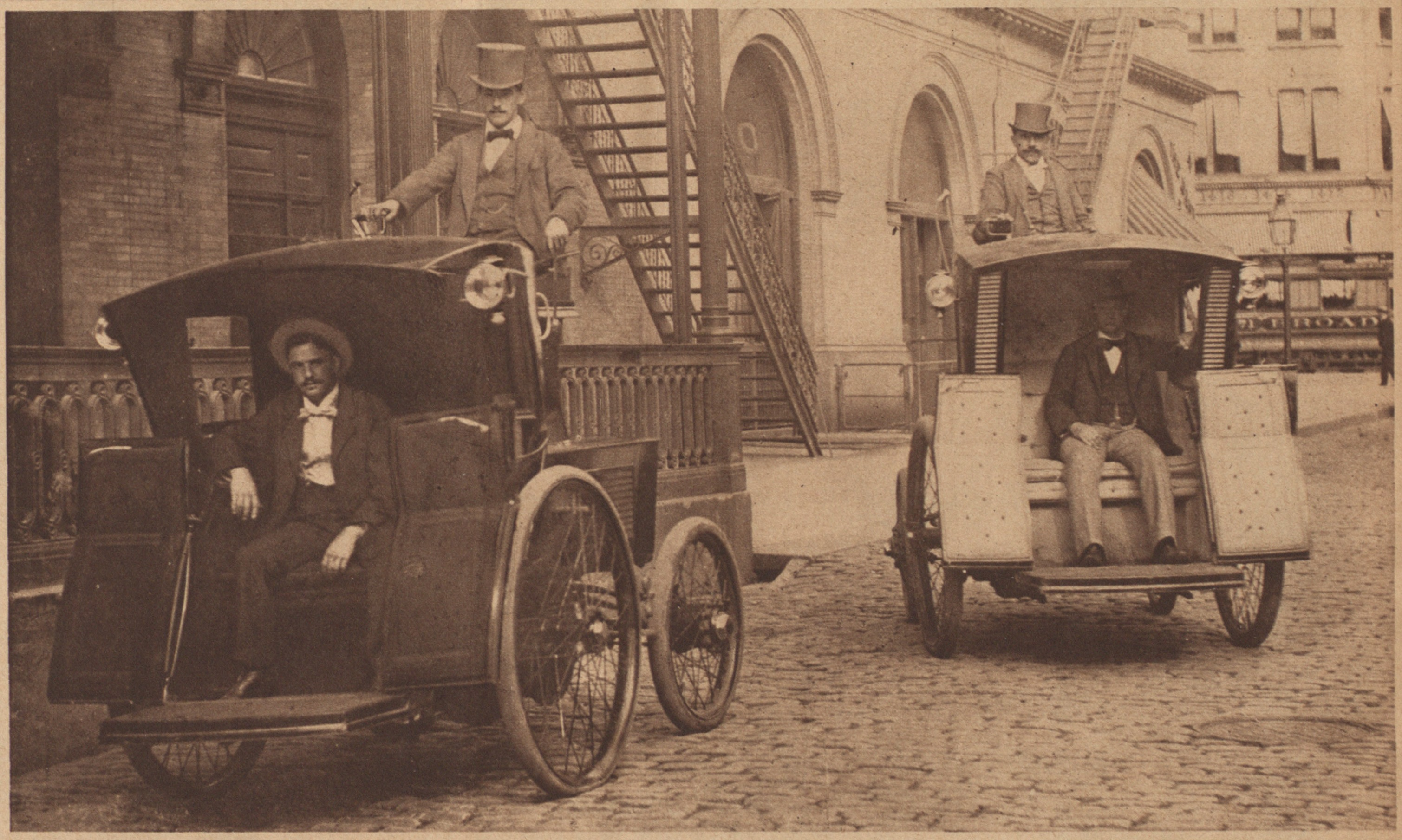
Electrobat Taxis in Manhattan in 1898

== See also ==
- 1895 Electrobat IV at ConceptCarz
