= Electric Motive Power =

English electric car

- Industry: Automotive
- Founded: 1894; 132 years ago
- Defunct: 1900; 126 years ago
- Headquarters: Balham, London
- Products: Cars , bus

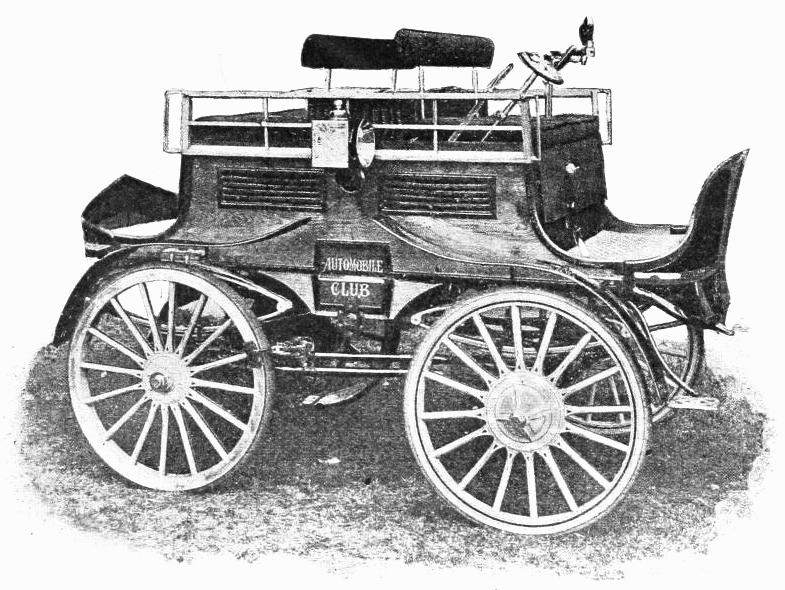
Electric Motive Power Dos- à-dos electric

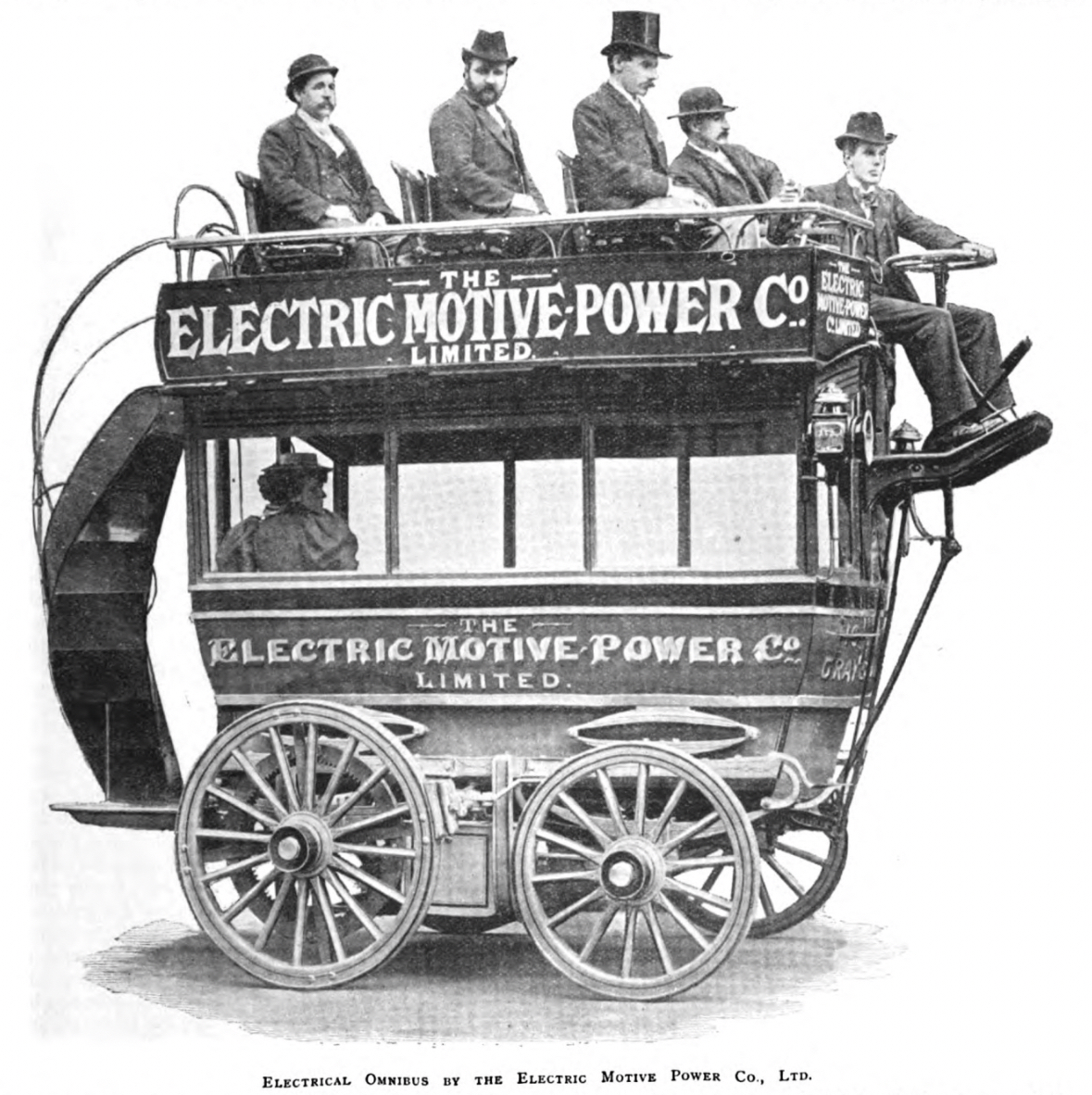
Electric Motive Power Omnibus (1896)

The Electric Motive Power was an English electric car manufacturer that was in operation from 1894 to 1900. The company from 16 Elmfield Road in the Balham district of London began producing automobiles in 1894. The brand name was EMP. Production ended in 1900. Only a few vehicles were sold in total. Initially, horse-drawn omnibuses were fitted with electric motors. The bus allowed 26 passengers to ride. From 1897, automobiles were developed. Mentioned are a 2 HP as a four-seat Victoria, a 5 HP as a Dogcart, and a 2 HP as a tricycle. A heavy phaeton, it was capable of running 20 miles (32 km) on one charge.

== See also ==
- List of car manufacturers of the United Kingdom
