= Bersey Electric Cab =

1896 British early electric vehicle

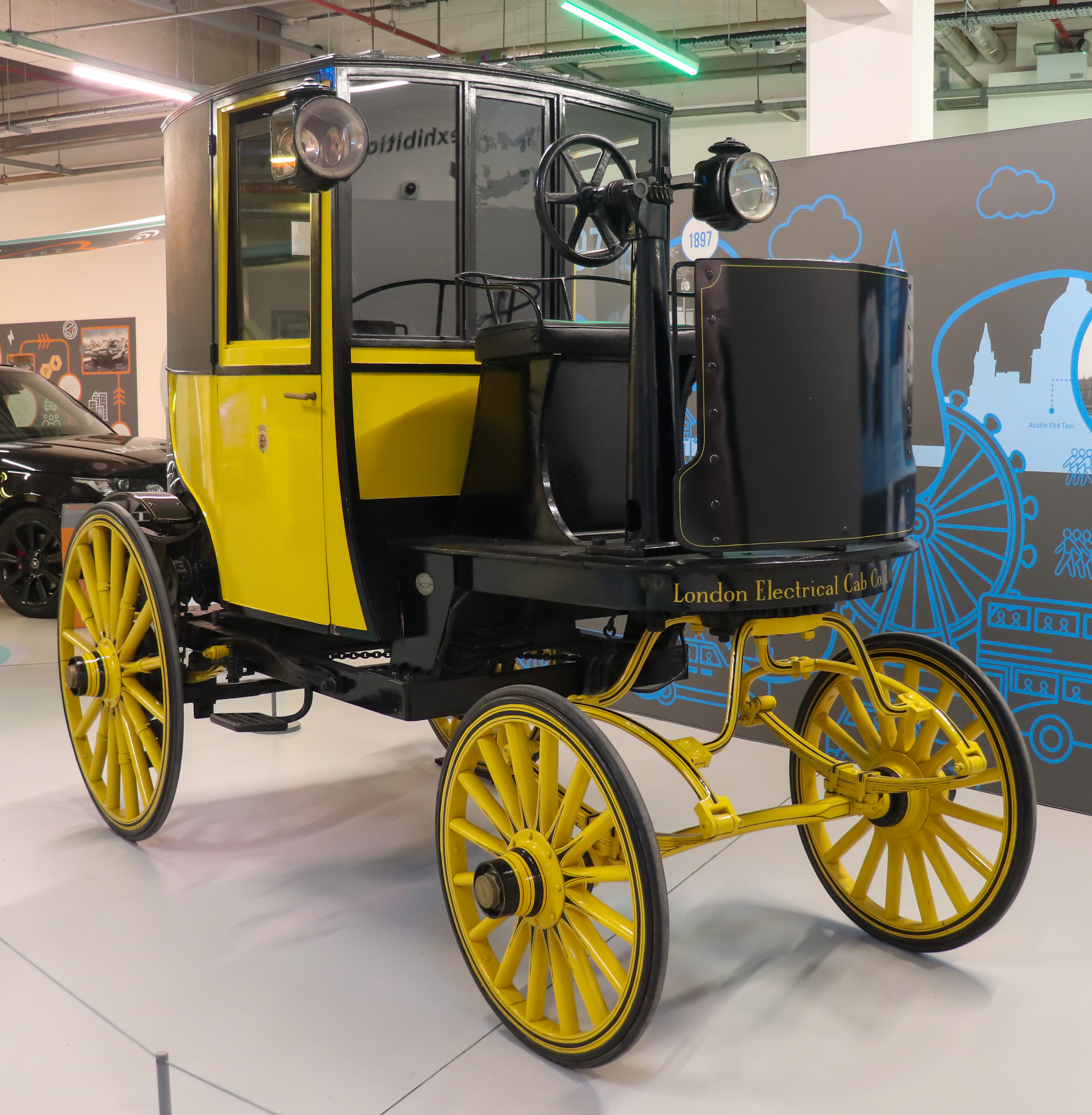
- The 1897 Bersey Electric Cab, in the British Motor Museum, in Gaydon, United Kingdom

Overview
- Manufacturer: London Electrical Cab Company
- Production: 1896–1899
- Designer: Walter Bersey

Body and chassis
- Class: Electric car, taxi
- Body style: Brougham
- Layout: Rear Engine, RWD

Powertrain
- Engine: Johnson-Lundell Electric Motor
- Power output: 2.2–6 kilowatts (3.0–8.0 bhp; 3.0–8.2 PS); 11–15.2 newton-metres (8.1–11.2 lbf⋅ft)
- Transmission: 1-Speed Direct Drive
- Range: 48–56 kilometres (30–35 mi)

Dimensions
- Curb weight: 2,000 kilograms (4,400 lb)

The Bersey Electric Cab (also known as the London Electrical Cab) was an early electric-powered vehicle and the first electric hackney carriage (black cab) in London. Developed by Walter Bersey and promoted by Harry Lawson and his Great Horseless Carriage Company, the vehicles had a top speed of up to 12 mph (19 km/h) and could carry two passengers. An initial service of 12 cabs began on 19 August 1897, and a total of 77 were built, with a maximum of 75 in service at once.

Bersey cabs were initially popular and were nicknamed "hummingbirds" for the sound they made and their distinctive livery. The vehicles suffered badly from wear in service owing to their heavy weight. This damaged the batteries and tyres, which were expensive to replace, and made their operation unprofitable. The cabs were withdrawn in August 1899, and electric hackney carriages did not return to the streets of London until the Nissan Dynamo was introduced in October 2019.

== Design ==
The Bersey cab was designed by Walter Bersey, an electrical engineer who had earlier designed two electric-powered buses and a van, as well as private cars. The cab was driven by a Johnson-Lundell electric motor. The first versions (built 1897) had a 3.5 horsepower motor; later versions (1898) had 8 horsepower. Power was supplied by a bank of 40 grid-plate traction batteries with a total capacity of 170 ampere hours (assuming a 30 ampere demand). The batteries weighed 14 hundredweight (1,568 pounds, 711 kg) and, being delicate, were hung underneath the chassis on springs. Before going into service, the batteries were tested on Bersey's "shaking machine" to ensure they would stand up to the rigours of use.

Speed was controlled by means of a lever that provided three options: 3 or 7 or 9 mph (5 or 11 or 14 km/h). Braking was activated by a foot pedal that disconnected the electrical drive circuit. The cab as a whole weighed 2 long tons (2.0 t) and could carry two passengers. The range on a full charge was approximately 30–35 miles (48–56 km). A tray of discharged batteries could be replaced at the depot with a tray of charged batteries in a couple of minutes. Charging was reported to take 3 hours.

Lawson issued the prospectus for the London Electrical Cab Company two days after the London to Brighton emancipation run, seeking £150,000 capital. The first cabs were constructed by the Great Horseless Carriage Company, with bodies made by the coachbuilder Mulliner and designed to resemble a horse-drawn Brougham cab. Internal and external electric lighting was provided. The vehicle's four wheels were clad with solid rubber tyres that were intended to provide grip on London's greasy pavements. Around 50 cabs of an improved design were built in 1898 by the Gloucester Railway Waggon Company. These had larger batteries that produced a higher top speed of 12 mph (19 km/h). An improved suspension system was also used, with the passenger cab being mounted on separate springs to the accumulator.

A total of 77 cabs of both types were constructed. Bersey said the advantages of his invention were that "there is no smell, no noise, no heat, no vibration, no possible danger, and it has been found that vehicles built on this company's system do not frighten passing horses".

== In service ==
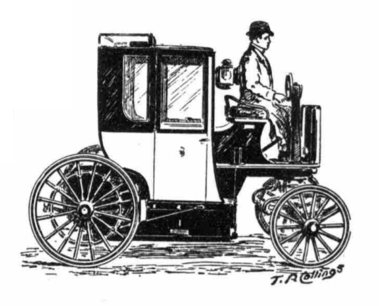
A 1897 illustration of the Bersey Electric Cab in service of the London Electrical Cab Company. Note the large black tray of batteries beneath the vehicle.

The London Electrical Cab Company put 12 Bersey cabs in service as hackney carriages in central London, on 19 August 1897; by the end of the year there were 25 with a further 50 improved versions added in 1898. They were the first self-propelled taxis in the city. As part of their licensing conditions, the Metropolitan Police had stipulated that they should meet four requirements: that they would be driven only by professional drivers; that they should be able to stop on demand; turn around in a small radius; and be able to climb Savoy Hill, the steepest in the city.

The same fares were charged as for horse-drawn cabs, and the Berseys were initially quite popular – even the Prince of Wales (the future King Edward VII) travelled in one. They quickly became known as "hummingbirds" for the noise made by their motors and their distinctive black and yellow livery. Passengers reported that the interior fittings were luxurious when compared to horse-drawn cabs, but there were some complaints that the bright internal lighting made passengers too conspicuous to those outside the cab.

The fleet peaked at around 75 cabs, all of which needed to return to the single depot at Lambeth to switch batteries. This was achieved by means of hydraulic lifts that could complete the operation in 2–3 minutes per cab. The London Electrical Cab Company planned to introduce additional battery charging and exchange depots to expand its coverage and range, and increase the number of cabs to 320 within a year. Owing to the expense of electricity that was available from distributors of the period, the company invested in its own electricity generators. Drivers were self-employed and hired the cabs from the company, initially at a rate of 6 shillings a day.

== Accidents ==
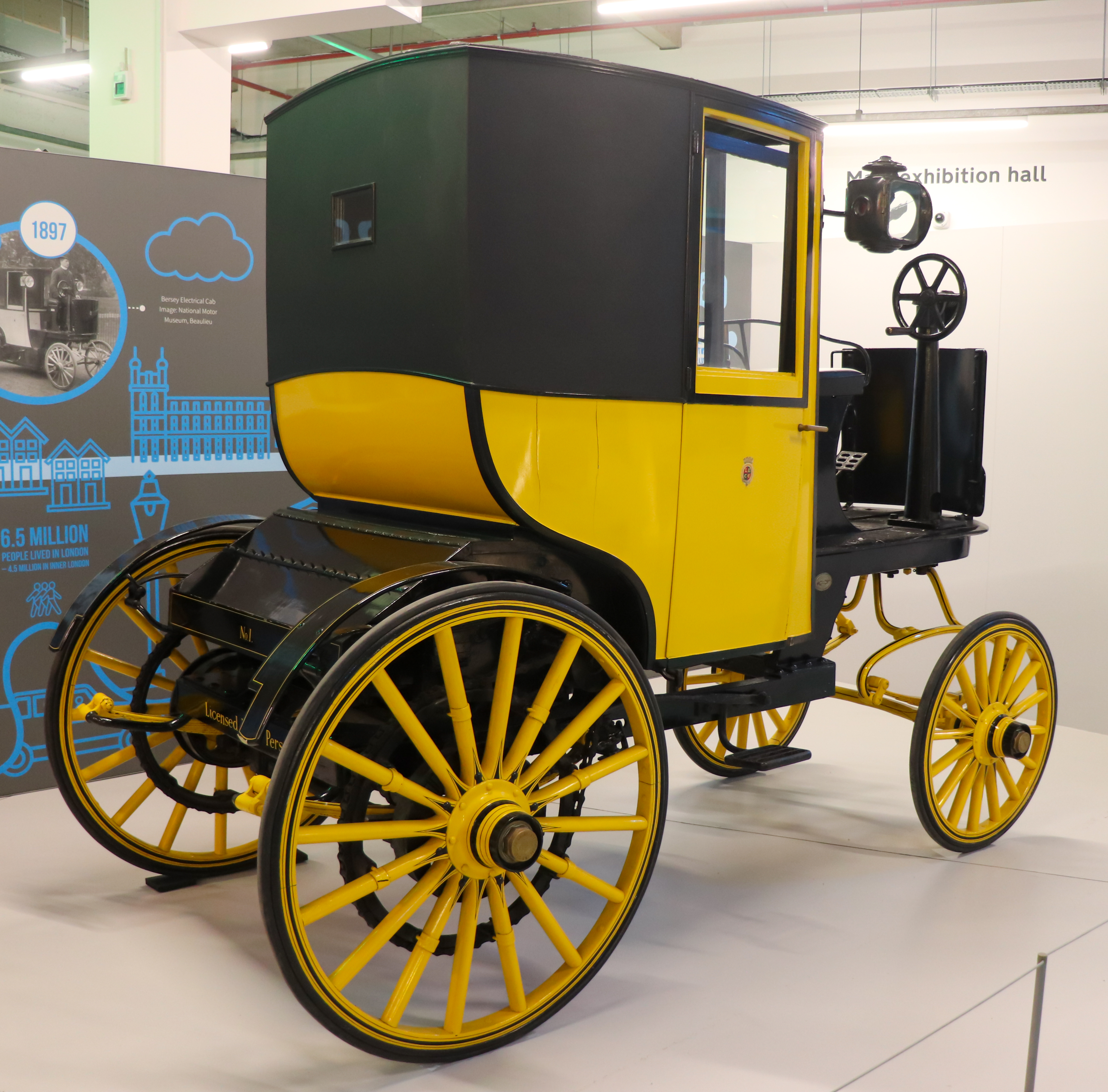
The rear of 1897 Bersey Electric Cab without its batteries

Just 22 days after the service began, one of the drivers, George Smith, crashed his cab into a building on New Bond Street. He was taken to Vine Street Police Station where a police surgeon certified that he was drunk. Smith, who said he had consumed 2–3 glasses of beer, became the first person ever to be charged with drunk driving and was fined 20 shillings at Marlborough Street Police Court.

Another incident saw a driver lose control and crash at Hyde Park Gate, causing extensive damage to property. A tendency for street urchins to hitch rides on the back of the cab saw the first fatality in September 1897: Stephen Hackney's coat became entangled in the driving chain of a cab, and he was fatally crushed.

Writing in 1902, Henry Charles Moore castigated the cabs for the danger which they posed:

... the [serious] objection to [the cabs] concerned the safety to the public. There are many people living who have been knocked down by carriages, cabs, omnibuses and vans, and have suffered little or no injury because they happened, by chance or design, to roll under the vehicle and thus escape all four wheels. But if knocked down by one of the electric cabs no such escape would have been possible, as the accumulator was only a few inches from the ground, and would have crushed to death any one who got beneath it.

== Fate ==
The tyres of the cabs suffered because of the heavy weight of the vehicle. Moore wrote:

Those indiarubber tyres which so constantly needed attention were no doubt the cause of their withdrawal.

After six months of operation they tended to be badly worn and produced increased vibration, which affected the delicate glass plates in the batteries. Worn tyres also increased the noise emitted by the vehicle. The accumulators also tended to slide around when the vehicle was moving and knock into the floor of the passenger cab.

The operation became plagued by breakdowns and the cabs were frequently slower than the horse-drawn alternative. The high cost of replacement batteries and tyres made the vehicles unprofitable, and the London Electrical Cab Company reported losses of £6,200 (equivalent to £861,800 in 2024) in its first year. The high accident rate and an increase in the cost of hire to 12 shillings 2 1/4 pence a day (equivalent to the rate to hire a horse-drawn cab) led to a decrease in the number of cabs on the streets. Some of the cabs were instead leased to private customers, including Prince Henri of Orléans, and at least one was exported to France.

The cabs were withdrawn from service, and the company closed in August 1899. There was no party willing to take on the business as a going concern so the company's assets, including the cabs, were sold off separately. A small number were purchased by private proprietors and continued in service until June 1900. That the business had been uneconomic was indicated by the consumption of its capital, its losses, and the failure to sell it as a going concern. Fully electric hackney carriages did not return to London's streets until the introduction of the Nissan Dynamo in October 2019. A Bersey cab survives in the collection of London's Science Museum.
