= Electric Vehicle Company =

Defunct American motor vehicle manufacturer

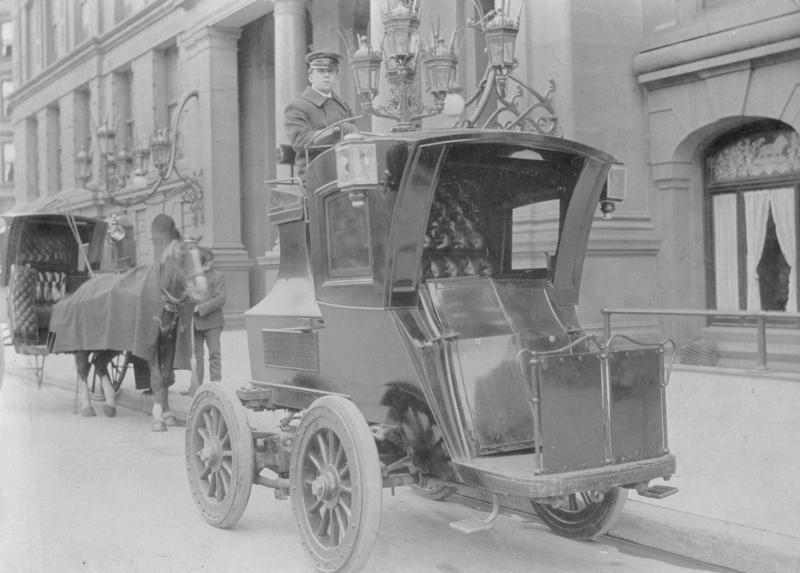
- Electric Vehicle Co. Hansom Cab, ca. 1904
- Industry: Automotive, Patent holding company
- Predecessors: Electric Carriage & Wagon Company (E.C.W.C.), Columbia Automobile Company, Riker Electric Vehicle Company
- Founded: September 27, 1897; 129 years ago in New York City
- Founders: Isaac Rice
- Defunct: 1907
- Fate: Bankrupted
- Headquarters: New York City
- Key people: Pedro G. Salom, Henry G. Morris, William C. Whitney, Albert Augustus Pope
- Products: Electric cars, Selden Patent
- Brands: Columbia, Electrobat
- Owners: William C. Whitney, Thomas Fortune Ryan; Anthony N. Brady, P. A. B. Widener, Albert Augustus Pope

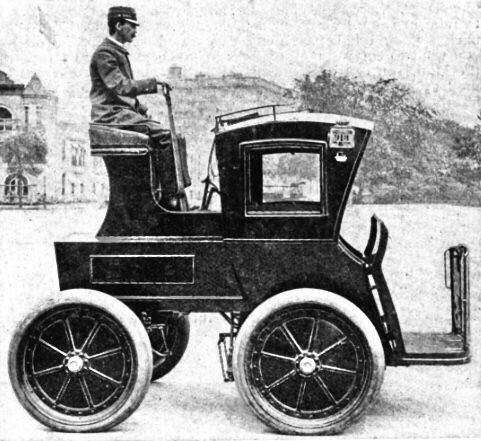
Electric Vehicle Company taxi (1898)

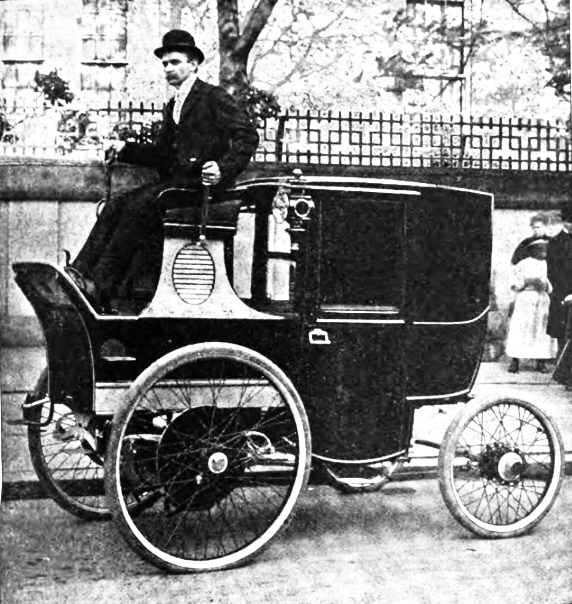
Electric Vehicle Company (1899)

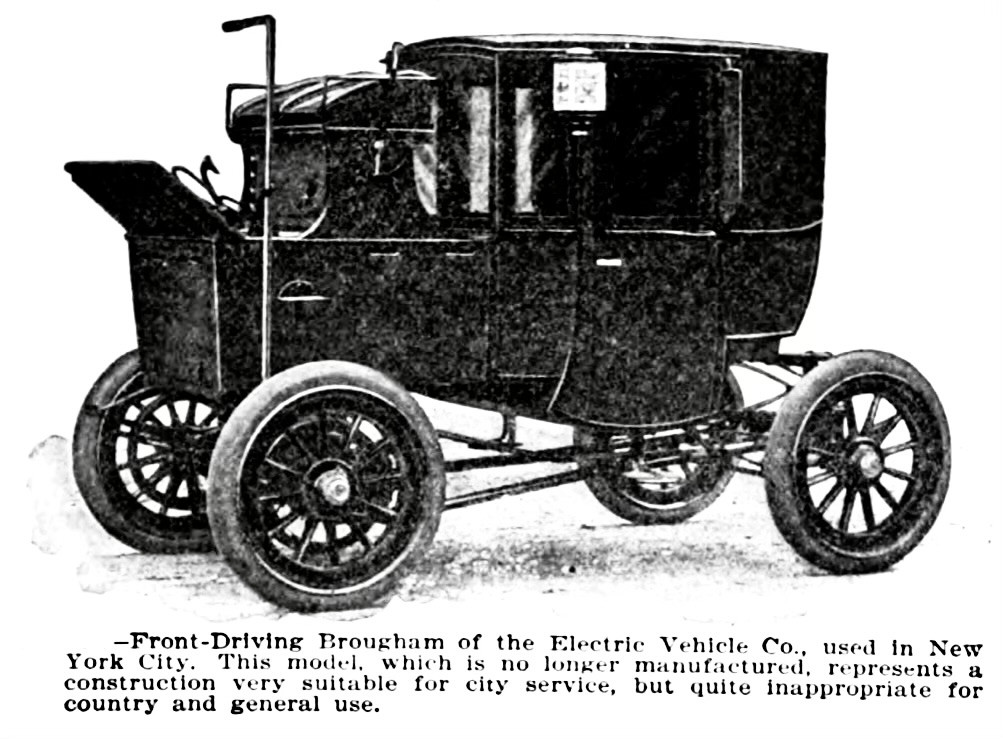
Electric Vehicle Company taxi

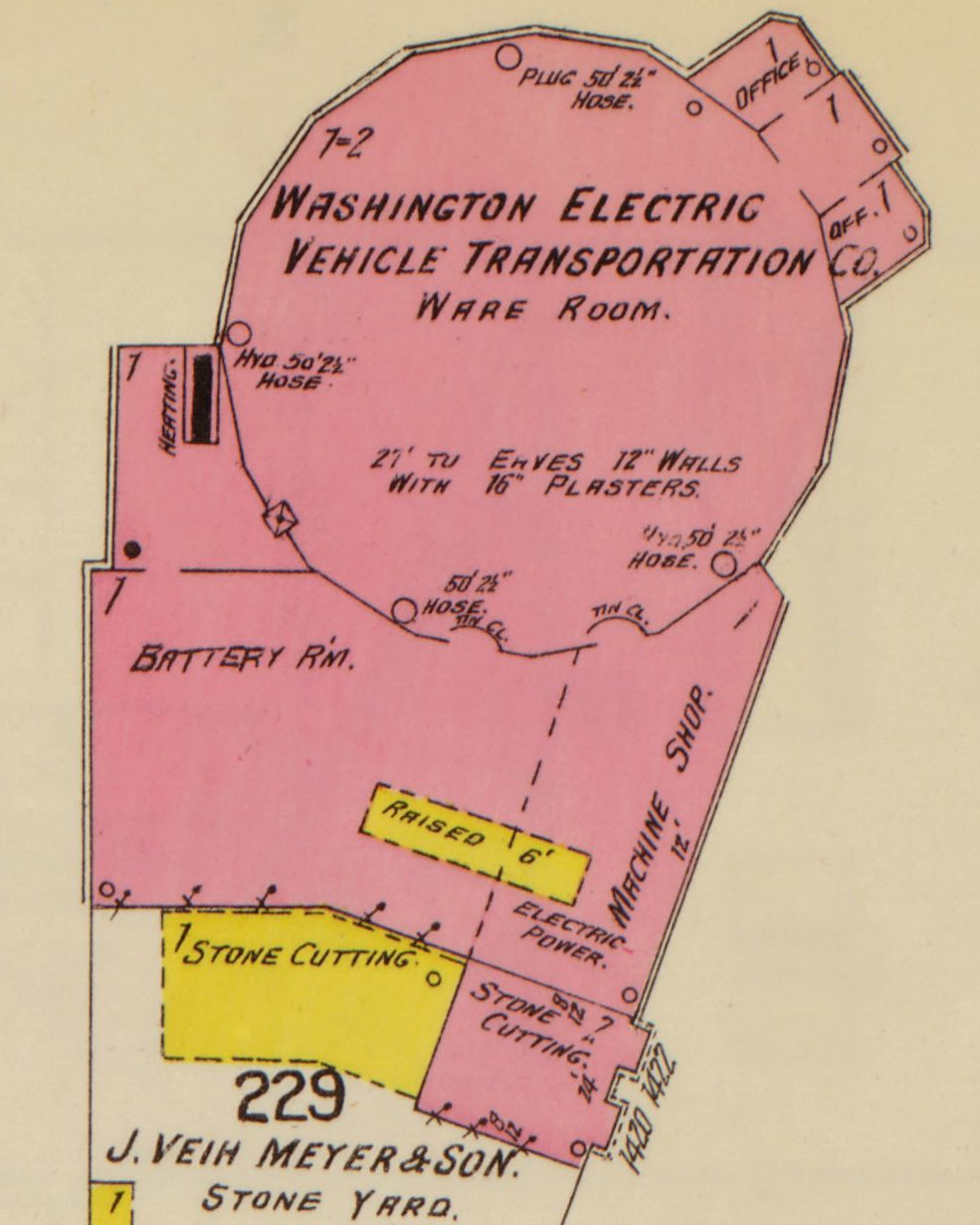
The company's arm in Washington, D.C., had a circular showroom next to its battery station and repair center at 15th Street NW and Ohio Avenue in the Murder Bay neighborhood.

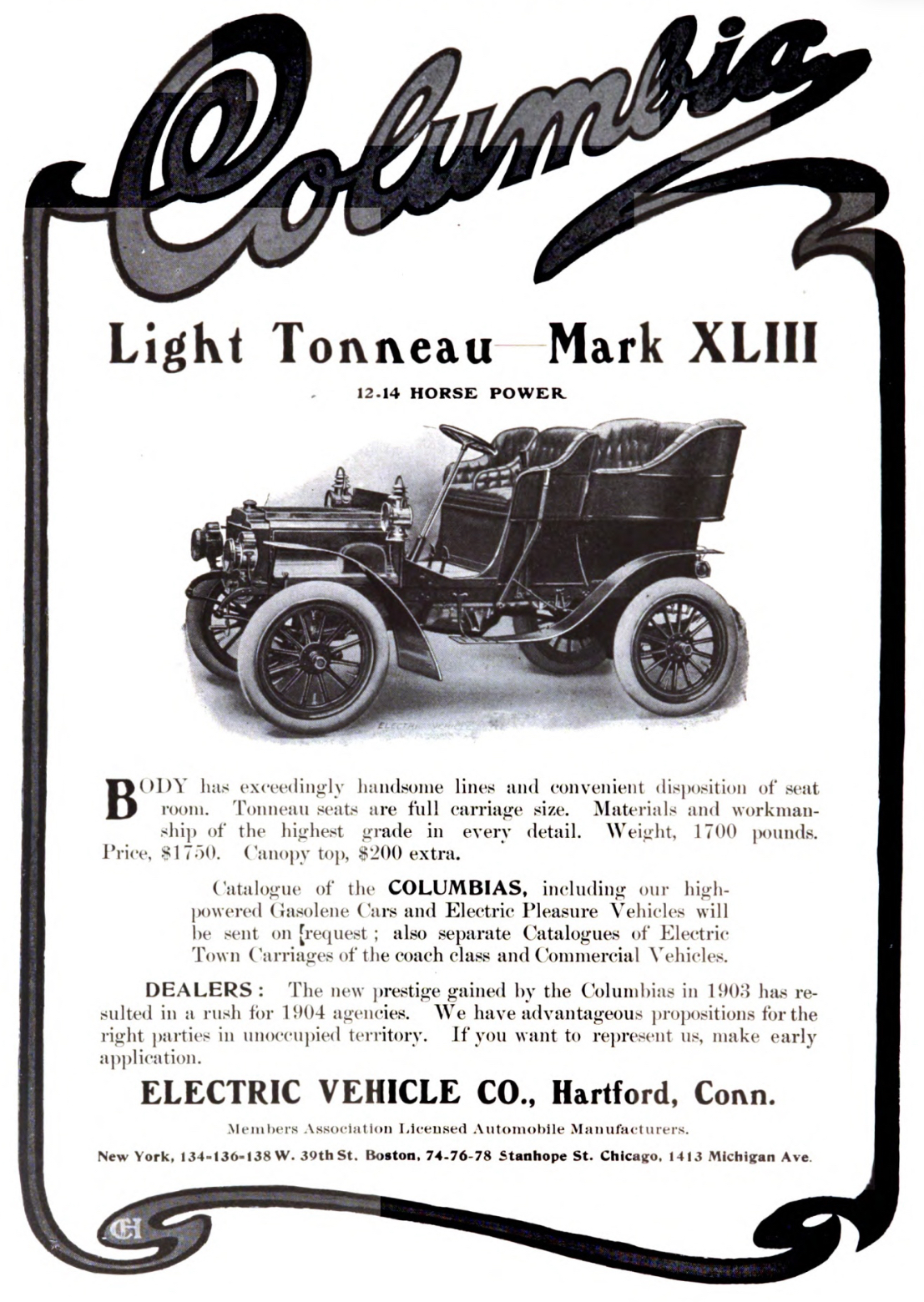
Columbia Model XLIII (1904)

Electric Vehicle Company was an American holding company that operated from 1897 to 1907 and was an early manufacturer of battery-powered automobiles.

== History ==
The Electric Vehicle Company was founded September 27, 1897, as a holding company of battery-powered electric vehicle manufacturers acquired and assembled by Isaac Rice.

In May 1897, Rice had acquired the Electric Carriage & Wagon Company (E.C.W.C.), a New York manufacturer of electric taxicabs. Its cabs were built by Henry G. Morris and Pedro G. Salom, who had created the Electrobats, the country's first useful electric automobiles. E.V.W.C. leased, rather than sold, its vehicles, and built service stations for repairs and to quickly change out battery sets. In January 1897, 12 of the cabs were in use in Manhattan.

After the merger, E.V.C. concentrated on building heavy but reliable electric cabs in the E.C.W.C. workshops, and it also operated the rental system for a short time. By 1899, E.V.C. had built several hundred vehicles and become the country's leading motor car manufacturer.

Electric Vehicle was taken over in 1899 by a syndicate of William C. Whitney, Thomas Fortune Ryan, Anthony N. Brady, and P. A. B. Widener. Their "Lead Cab Trust" aimed to develop a monopoly by placing electric cabs on the streets of major American cities, starting with New York City, Philadelphia, Chicago, Washington, D.C., and Boston. The company ultimately sold some 2,000 cars, but this was not enough to establish monopoly. It fell into hard times in 1900 as gasoline-powered automobiles emerged, lawsuits attacked their monopolistic practices, and scandal surrounded the poor performance of its vehicles. Oldsmobile displaced EVC as the top U.S. automaker in 1901.

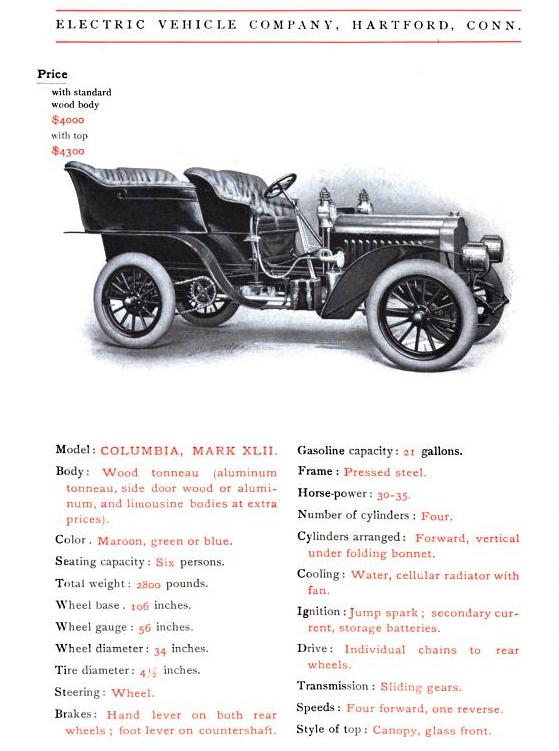
1905 Columbia Mark XLII

Whitney brought in industrial leader Albert Augustus Pope, who brought the Columbia Automobile Company. The trust was reorganized as the parent company of several vehicle manufacturers, among them Columbia and the Riker Electric Vehicle Company, which was acquired in 1902.

Electric Vehicle's chief asset was now the holding of the Selden Patent, which established a right to royalties from all manufacturers of internal combustion engine vehicles. While this was initially lucrative, it drew lawsuits and other opposition from other manufacturers.

The company declared bankruptcy in 1907. The patent remained valid until 1913, but lost its worth when the appellation court held that it only applied to vehicles with Brayton engines, of which none existed.

- Electric Vehicle Company XLIV-2
- Electric Vehicle Company Columbia Mark 48-2
- Electric Vehicle Company Columbia Mark 66-3
- Electric Vehicle Company Columbia Mark 48-3

== See also ==
- Columbia Automobile Company
- Electric Vehicle
- List of defunct United States automobile manufacturers
