= Robert Anderson (inventor) =

Scottish inventor

Robert Anderson was a 19th-century Scottish inventor, best known for inventing the first electric carriage, in Scotland around 1832–1839. The crude carriage was powered by non-rechargeable primary power cells.

== See also ==
- History of the electric vehicle
