= US Automobile =

American automobile manufactured between 1899 and 1901

The US Automobile was an American automobile manufactured between 1899 and 1901. A 3 hp electric car, it used three speeds forward and two back.
