= Bushbury Electric =

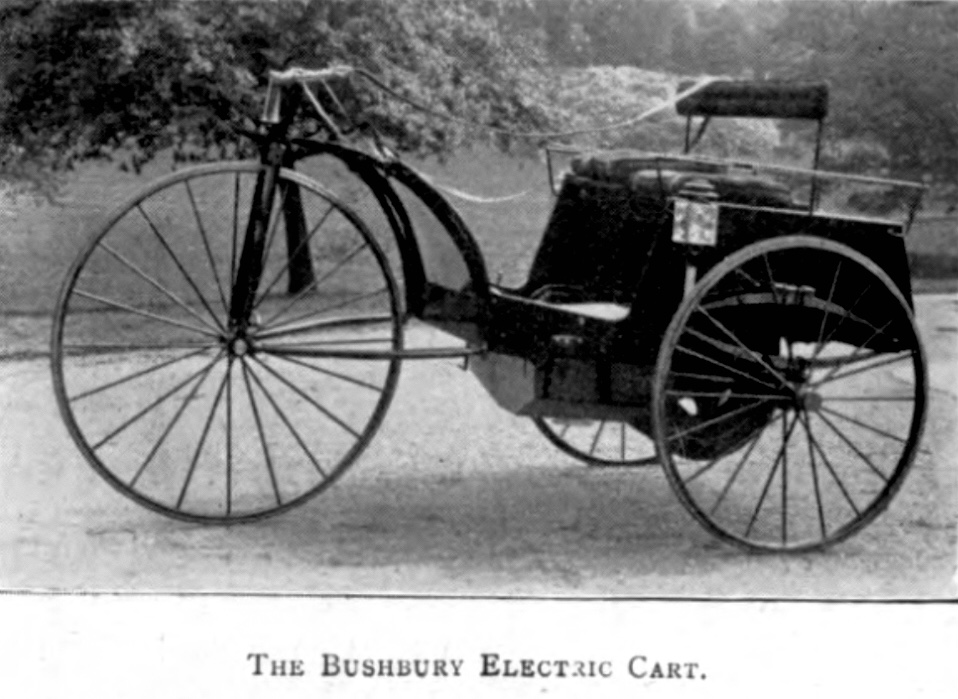
Bushbury Electric (1897)

The Bushbury Electric was an English automobile manufactured by the Star Cycle Factory of Wolverhampton in 1897. An electric car, it came in three- and four-wheeled models, some of which were controlled by reins. Power was provided by two large three-speed electric motors placed under the seat, along with the battery. The vehicle's range was limited.

== See also ==
- List of car manufacturers of the United Kingdom
