= Camille Alphonse Faure =

French chemist (1840–1898)

Camille Alphonse Faure (21 May 1840, Vizille – 14 September 1898) was a French chemical engineer who in 1881 significantly improved the design of the lead-acid battery, which had been invented by Gaston Planté in 1859. Faure's improvements greatly increased the capacity of such batteries and led directly to their manufacture on an industrial scale. The patents were assigned to the Société La Force et la Lumière. The right to use the patents in the British Isles were sold to the Faure Electric Accumulator Company on 29 March 1881. Faure was a consultant engineer with William Edward Ayrton for this company.

== Biography ==
He was born at Vizille and trained at the Ecole des Arts et Métiers at Aix. From 1874 until about 1880, he worked as a chemist at the new factory of the Cotton Powder Company at Uplees, Faversham, Kent, England. While there, he and the factory manager, George Trench, took out patents for tonite, a new high explosive (1874), and an improved dynamite detonator (1878).

In 1880, Faure patented a method of coating lead plates with a paste of lead oxides, sulphuric acid and water, which was then cured by gentle warming in a humid atmosphere. The curing process caused the paste to change to a mixture of lead sulphates which adhered to the lead plate. During charging the cured paste was converted into electrochemically active material (the "active mass") and gave a substantial increase in capacity compared with Planté's battery. It was a significant breakthrough thats led to the industrial manufacture of lead-acid batteries, now used for starting motor cars.

Towards the end of his life, Faure was granted further patents, among them ones for the manufacture of aluminium alloys, improvements to hot air engines, and motor vehicle steering mechanisms.
