= Egger-Lohner C.2 Phaeton =

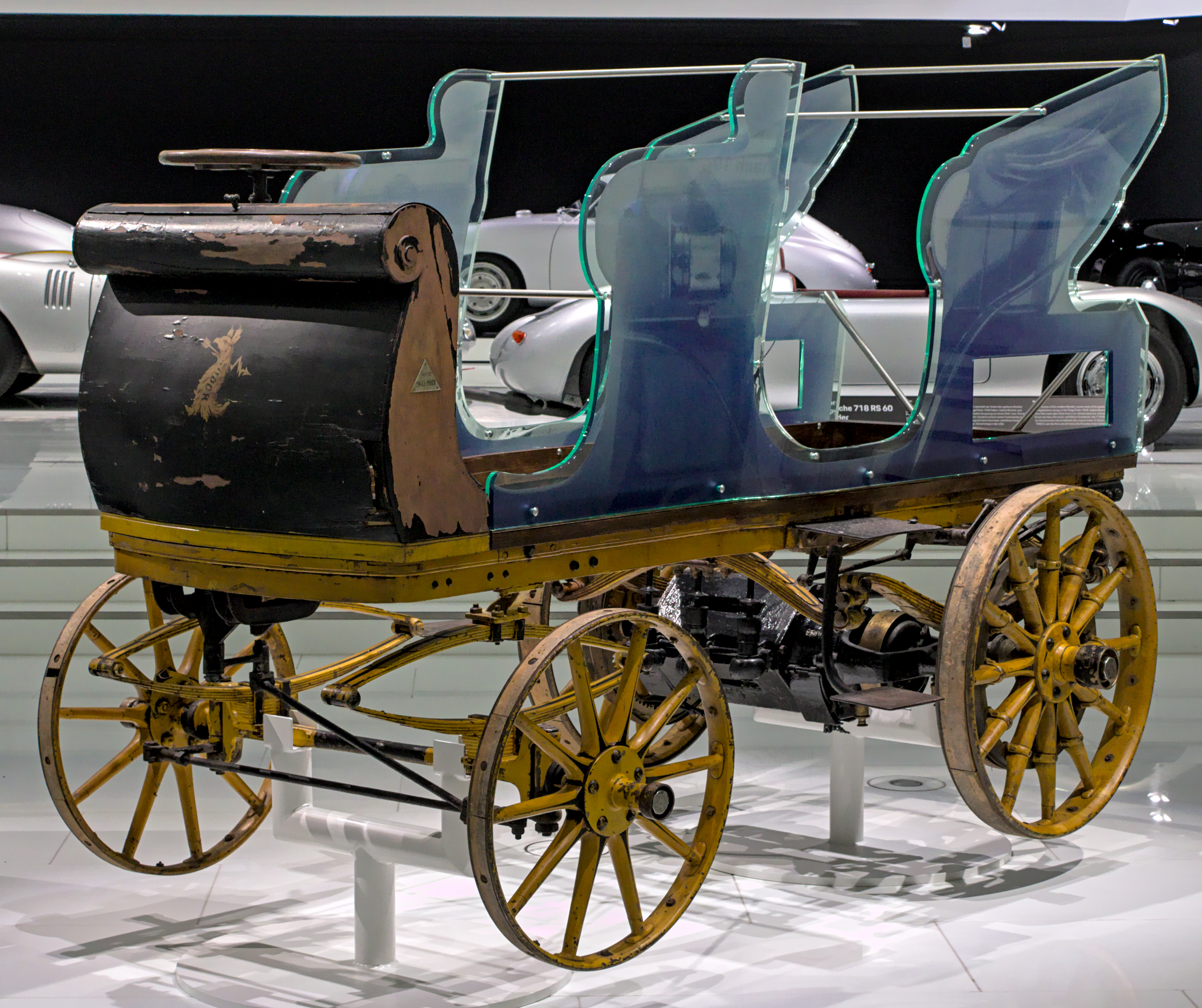
- Egger-Lohner C.2 Phaeton in the Porsche Museum

Overview
- Manufacturer: Egger-Lohner
- Production: 1898-1899
- Model years: 1898
- Assembly: Austria

Body and chassis
- Class: Electric car

Powertrain
- Transmission: single-speed
- Battery: Tudor batteries
- Range: approx 49 miles (79 km)

Dimensions
- Curb weight: 2,977 lbs (1,350 kg)

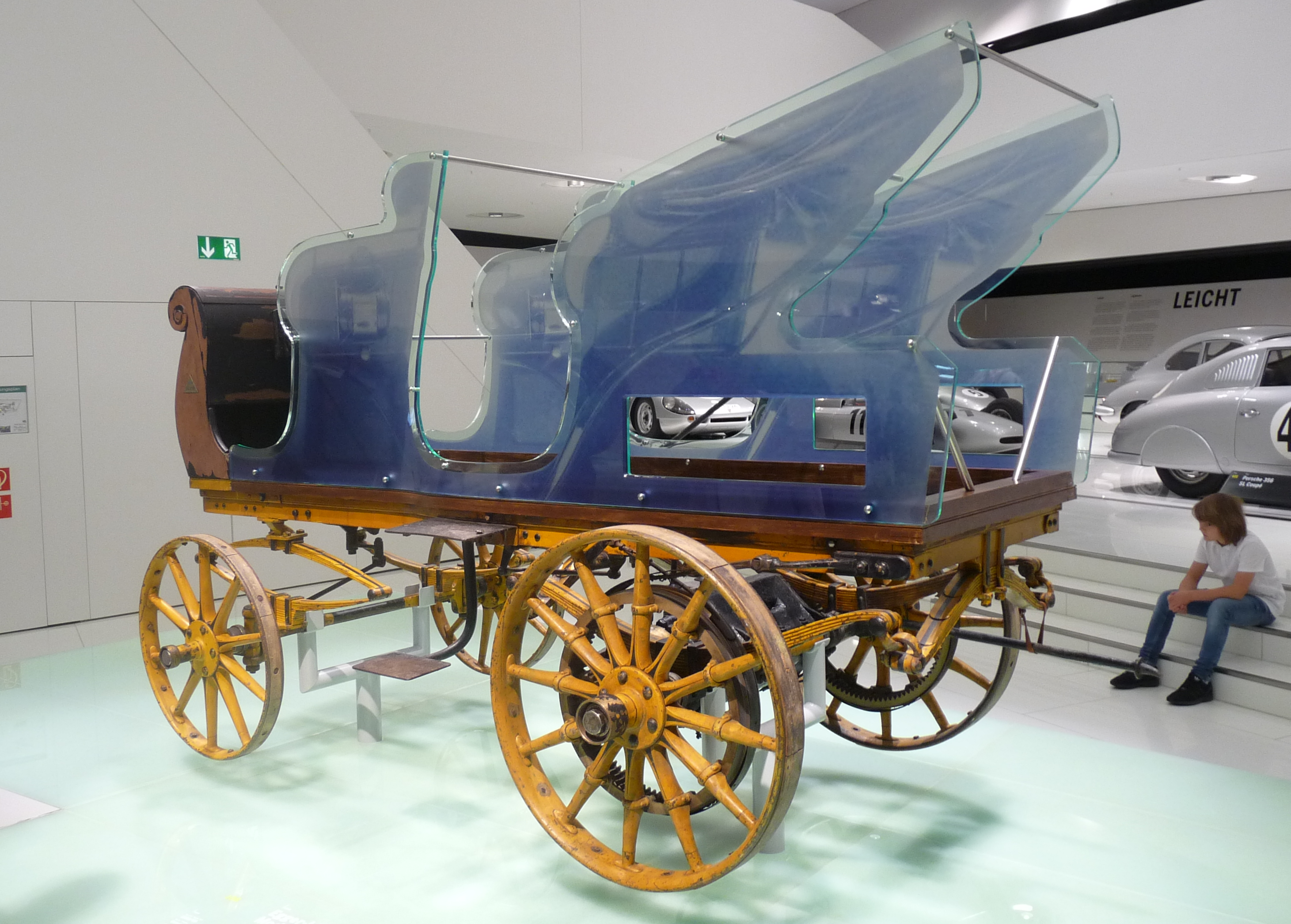
The Porsche Museum fitted translucent plastic panels to their C.2 to show what the original body would have looked like

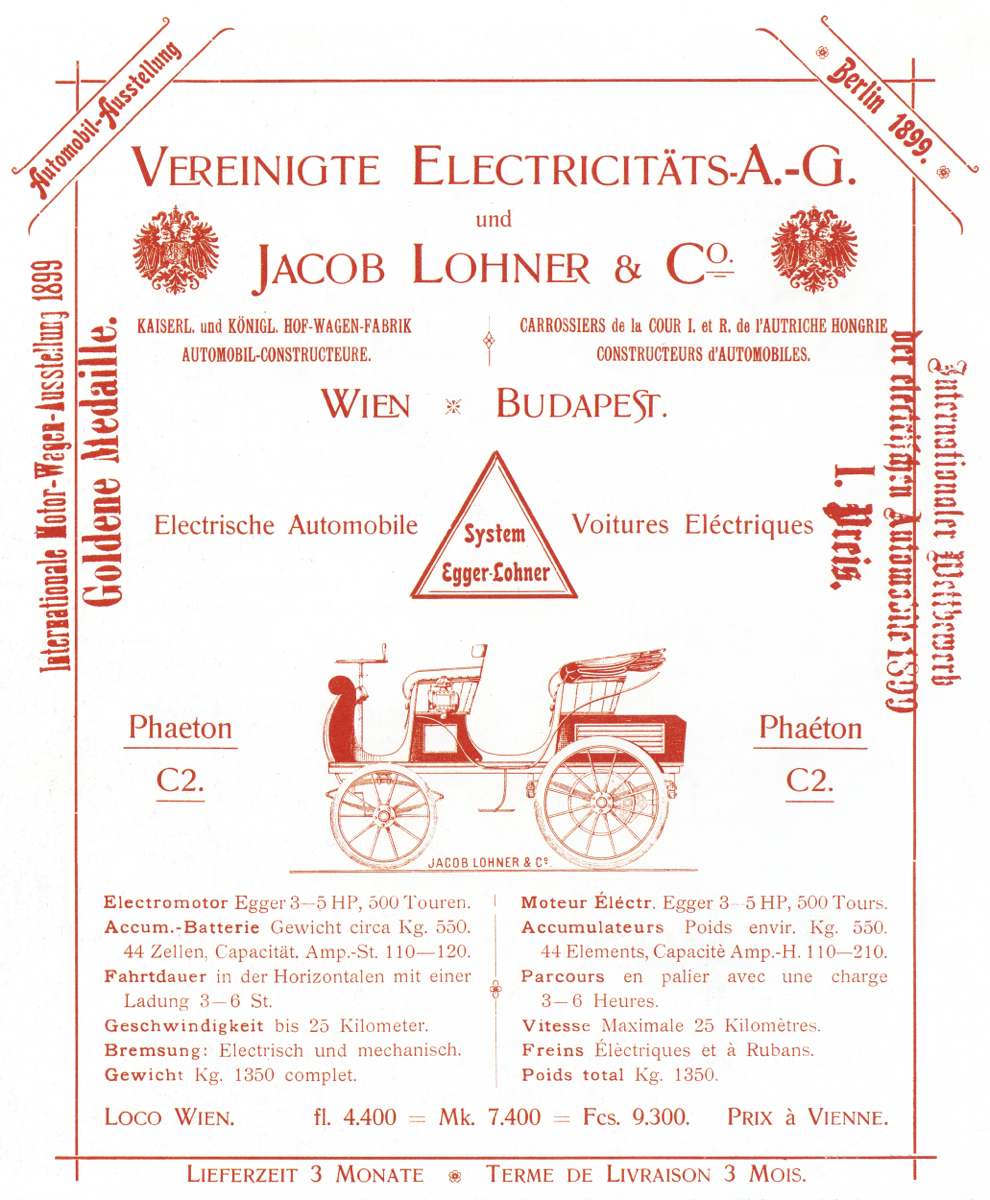
Advertisement for Egger-Lohner C.2 Phaeton

The Egger-Lohner C.2 Phaeton, erroneously called Porsche P1, is an electric vehicle built by Egger-Lohner. It is the first vehicle that Ferdinand Porsche somewhat contributed to. The vehicle resembles a horse-drawn carriage with an electrical motor attached to it. Approximately four were built.

== Powertrain ==
The C.2 Phaeton model is in fact a four-seat vehicle. It is powered by the "octagon" electric motor, that Ferdinand Porsche designed, which took its name from the eight-sided design of the motor housing. The electric motor can produce an output of 3 hp (2.2 kW) at 350 rpm and, for short periods of time, up to 5 hp (3.7 kW) with a top speed of 35 km/h (22 mph) by overcharging it. The car could be driven for three to five hours with a range of approximately 49 mi (79 km). The car uses a complicated series of gears: it is driven by using a 12-speed controller where six are dedicated to forward gears, two for reverse and four to brake the car.

== Body ==
The vehicle could also be styled as an open-air chassis or a coupe. Because of its alternating body, it could be used in different seasons and weathers. The vehicle is mainly made out of wood and weighs 2,977 lb (1,350 kg) with the battery itself weighing over 1,103 lb (500 kg). The wheels are also made out of wood and are surrounded with pneumatic tires.

== History ==
Near the end of the 19th century, Ludwig Lohner, the owner of the Austrian carriage maker Jacob Lohner, travelled in Europe and the United States. He became convinced that the age of horse and carriage was over and that his company should start building automobiles. In 1898, Lohner experimented with self-propelled carriages. A joint venture of Vereinigte Electricitäts A.G. and Lohner built a phaeton car. It had an electric drive train that was designed by Ferdinand Porsche. On September 28, 1899, Porsche drove a C.2 that was entered in the Berlin road race, where it won the gold medal and crossed the finish line 18 minutes before the second car. It also came out on top in the efficiency test, where it was recorded as the lowest energy consumption vehicle in urban traffic.

=== Porsche P1? ===
Lohner stored a C.2 in a warehouse in Hernals in 1902. In 1906, it was donated to the Vienna Technical Museum. The museum stored its C.2 Phaeton in a warehouse from 1918 onwards, because it owned another C.2 that was more complete. In 2010, the museum exchanged the stored C.2 for a Steyr V and a Kaiman Mk IV racing car that Niki Lauda had started his career with.

The new owner sold the C.2 to Wolfgang Porsche, who donated it to the Porsche Museum in Stuttgart, Germany. In January 2014, it was presented there to the press as "The First Porsche Ever". Shortly afterwards, it became clear that this was not correct.

Porsche claimed that Ferdinand Porsche engraved the code "P1" (P for Porsche, number 1) onto all of the key components, thus giving the vehicle its unofficial name. However, though one component bears the P1 code, it is unclear who engraved it and what the code stands for. Additionally, Porsche only contributed the electric motor to the project, reducing the claim that C.2 is the company's first vehicle.

The car is currently on display in the Porsche Museum and remains in good condition. Its motor still functions, but the batteries and seats are missing, and the instrument panel is not original. This example has been fitted with translucent blue perspex panels by the museum, showing what the original body would have looked like.

== See also ==
- List of German cars
