= American Electric (1899 automobile) =

Defunct American motor vehicle manufacturer

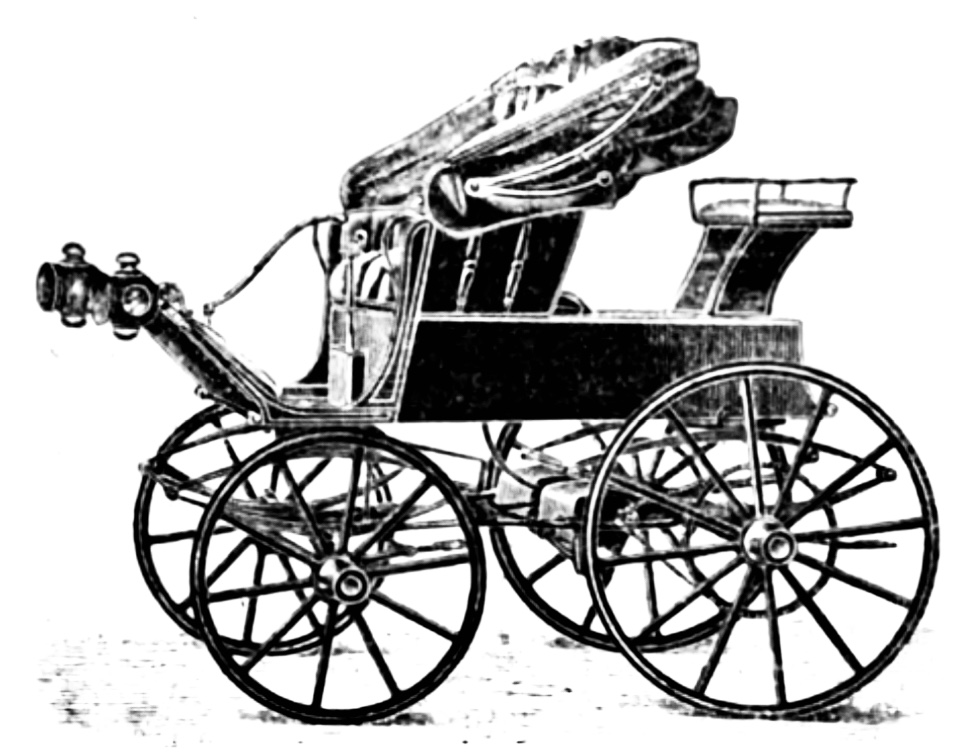
1900 American Electric Vehicle Company (1897).

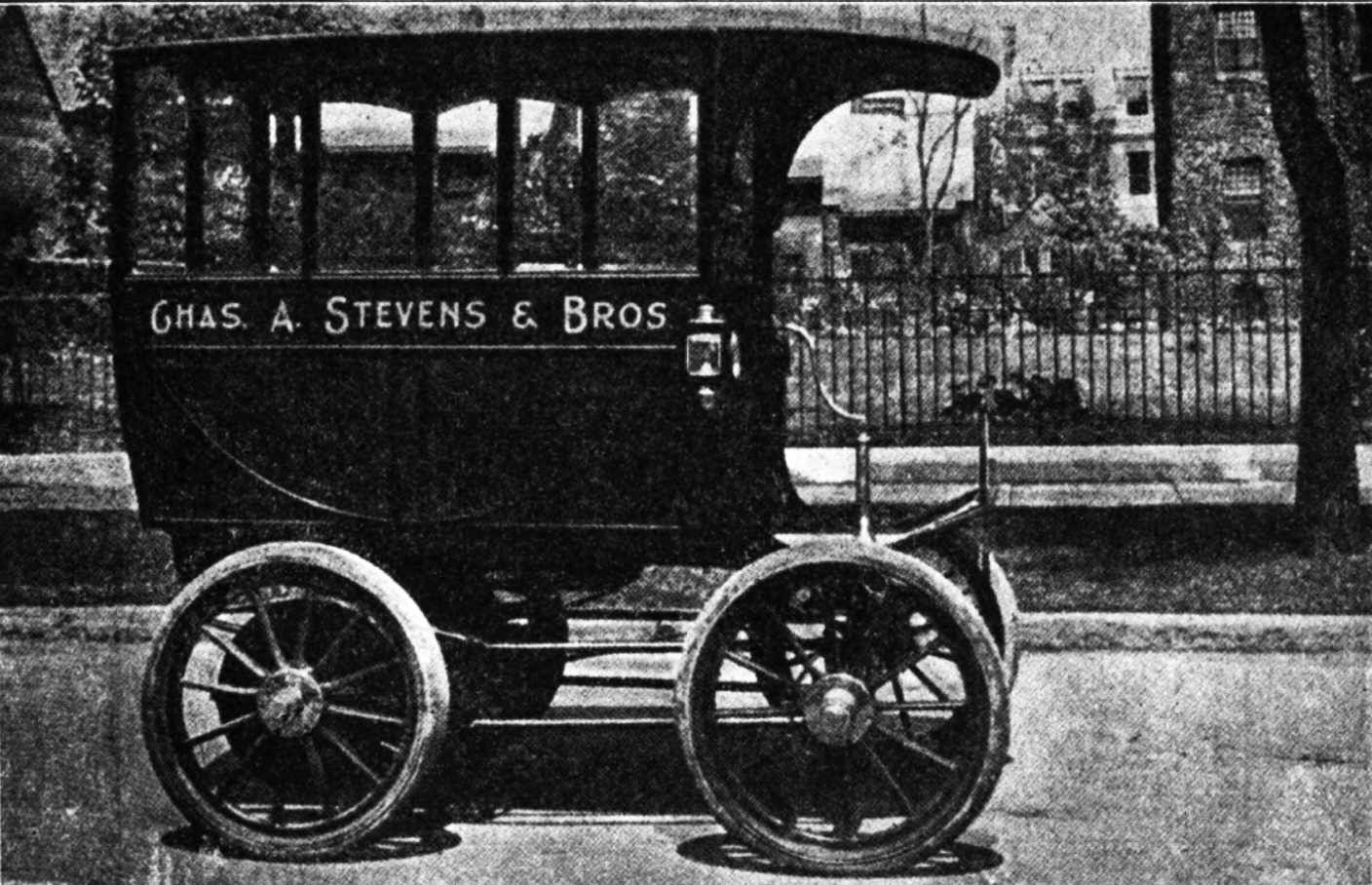
American Electric (1898).

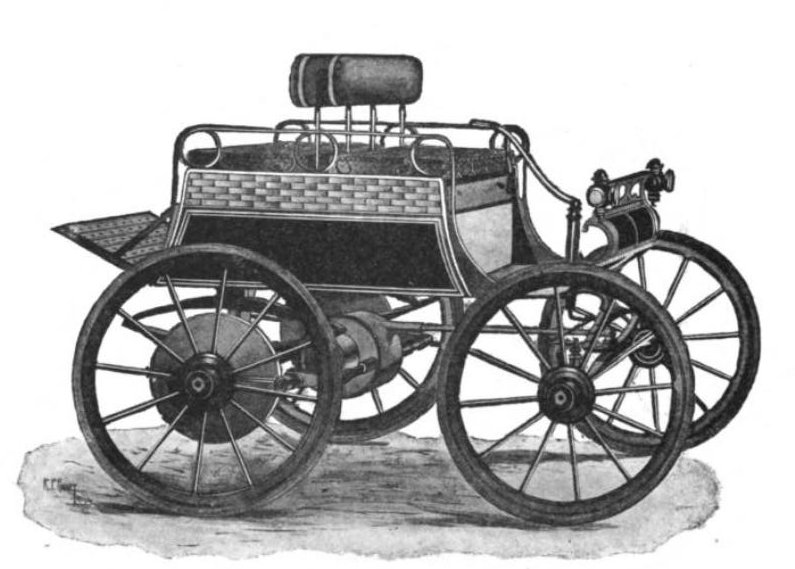
1900 American Electric Dos-A-Dos

The American Electric was an American automobile manufactured in Chicago from 1899 to 1902 and Hoboken, New Jersey, in 1902. The company was incorporated by Clinton Edgar Woods in 1895 as American Electric Vehicle Co. Chicago, and merged with Indiana Bicycle Co. to become Waverly in 1898 and later Pope-Waverley.

The company built a wide range of electric carriages - some bodied as high, ungainly-looking dos-a-dos four-seaters - these were claimed to be capable of running from 35 miles (56 km) to 50 miles (80 km). Perhaps optimistically, the manufacturer claimed that "very few private carriages would ever be subjected to such a test". The company moved to New Jersey in 1902, according to a company statement, “to find more wealthy customers,” but they shut down operations within the year.

== See also ==
- History of the electric vehicle
- List of defunct United States automobile manufacturers
