= Halmi =

Halmi may refer to:

- Artúr Lajos Halmi (1866–1939), Hungarian painter
- Robert Halmi (1924–2014), Hungarian-American film and television producer
- Halmi, the Hungarian name for Halmeu Commune, Bihor County, Romania
