= Moon Motor Car =

Defunct American motor vehicle manufacturer

Moon Motor Car Company
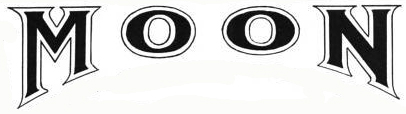
- The Ideal American Car
- Type: Automobile Manufacturing
- Industry: Automotive
- Founded: 1905; 121 years ago
- Founder: Joseph W. Moon
- Defunct: 1930; 96 years ago
- Fate: ceased trading
- Headquarters: St. Louis, Missouri, United States
- Key people: Joseph W. Moon, Stewart McDonald, W.D. Hemenway
- Products: Vehicles; Automotive parts
- Production output: 59,485 (1905-1930)
- Brands: Moon, Diana, Windsor

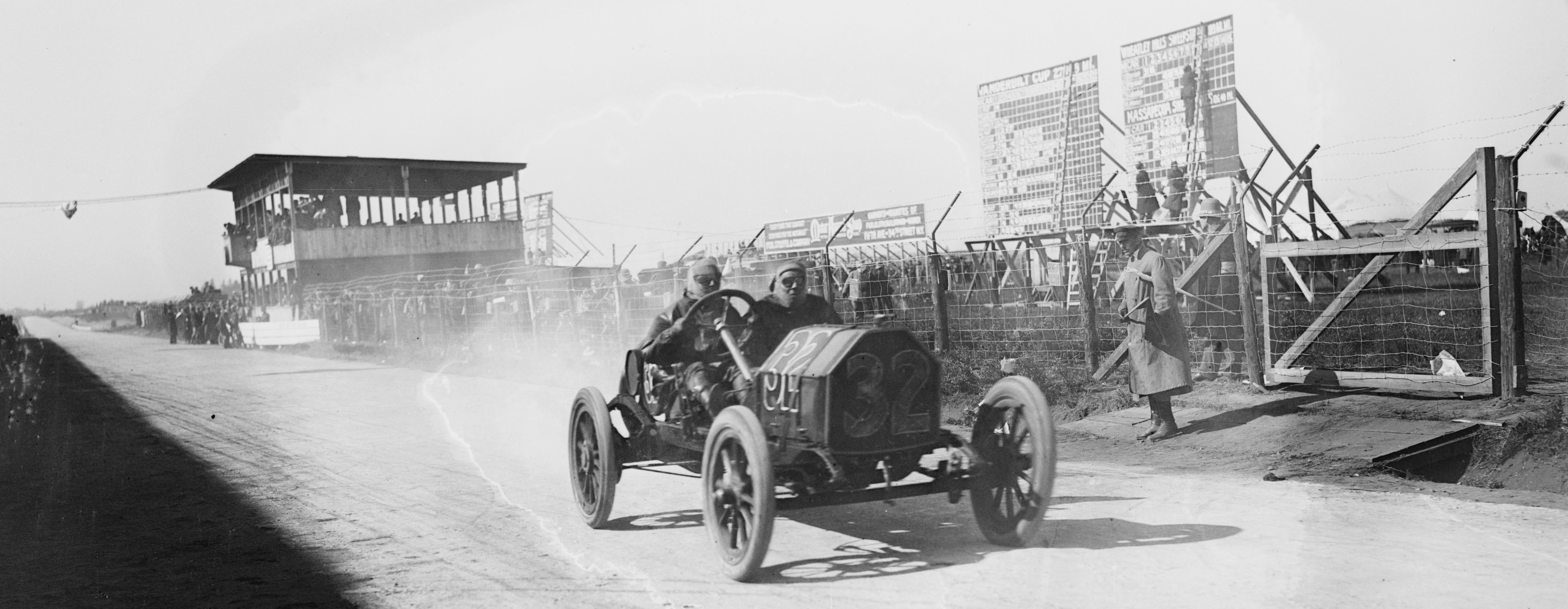
Car #32 - Moon - winning the 1909 Wheatley Hills Race

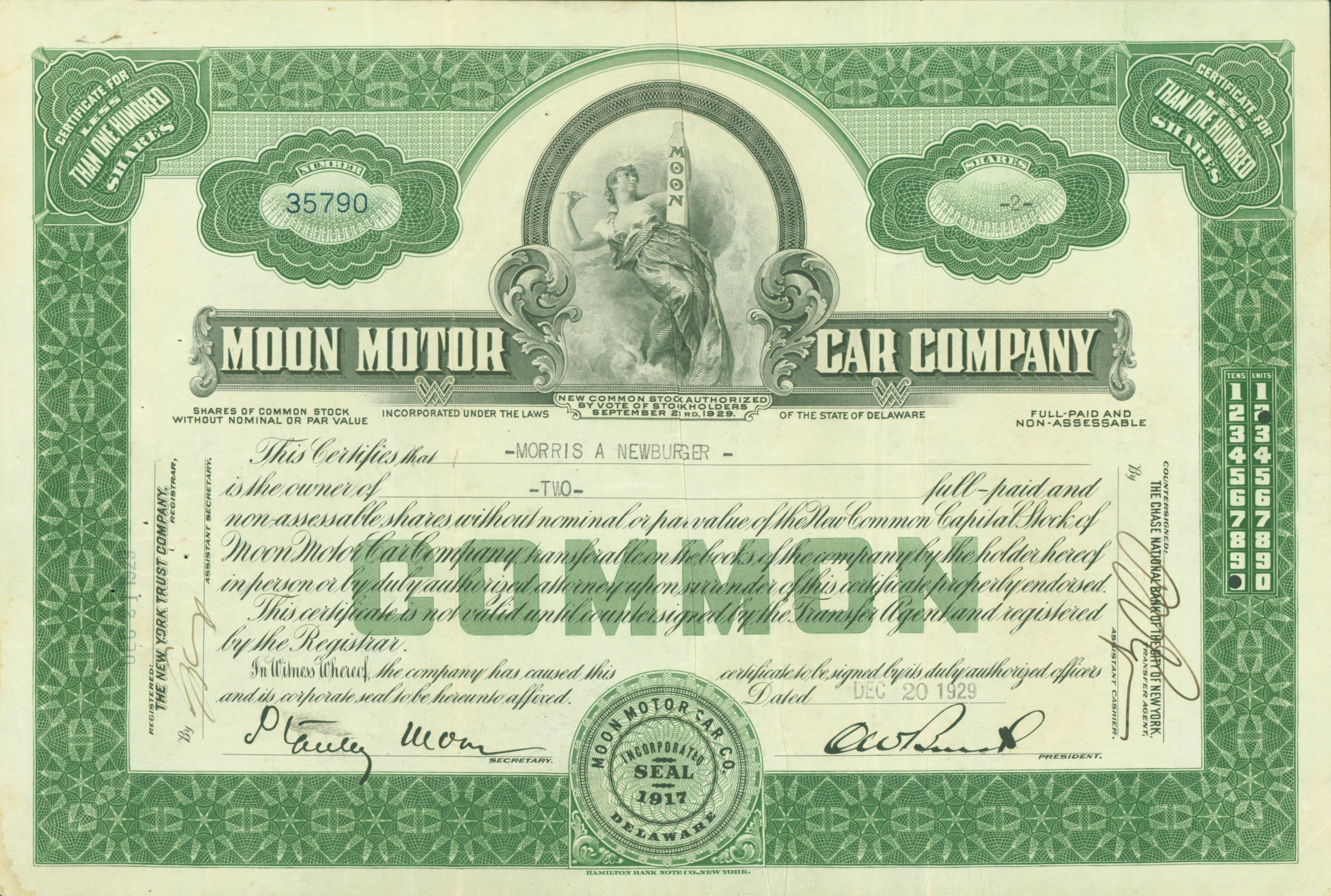
Share of the Moon Motor Car Company, issued 20 December 1929

Moon Motor Car Company (1905 – 1930) was an American automobile company that was located in St. Louis, Missouri. The company had a venerable reputation among the buying public, as it was known for fully assembled, easily affordable mid-level cars using high-quality parts. Often this meant the manufacturing process required more human intervention, leading to operating losses. The company was founded by carriage maker Joseph W. Moon. Moon produced both cars and trucks.

== History ==
The first Moon, Model A was shown at the New York Automobile Show in January 1906. It was a four-cylinder Rutenber engined car. In 1906 former Peerless engineer Louis P. Mooers joined Moon. Mooers designed a 4-cylinder overhead camshaft engine and with a four-speed transmission and aluminum bodywork, the Moon was a luxury car at $3,000 (equivalent to $103,661 in 2025). In 1908 Moons were sold in the eastern United States using the Hol-Tan name.

By 1910 more mid-priced cars in the $1,500 to $2,000 range that were competitive with Buick and Oldsmobile, became more common. In 1916 Moon was using six-cylinder engines exclusively and in 1919 introduced their Parthenon style radiator. Joseph Moon died in 1919 and was succeeded by his son-in-law and Vice President Stewart McDonald. The St. Louis management included officers Stewart McDonald; W.D. Hemenway; A.F. Moberly; Stanley Moon; E.F. Nelson; C.W.A. Voge. Moon automobiles could get custom coachwork from designers such as Pullman, Rubay and Murray. Moon exports increased in the 1920s when they reported they were delivering to 47 countries.

Beginning in 1924, Moon was increasingly unable to meet dealership orders. Factory capacity would be an issue for the next several years. Moon Motor's peak production year was 1925 when the company produced 10,271 vehicles and the prices ranged from $1,195 to $2,540 (equivalent to $46,631 in 2025). Moon produced the Diana via its subsidiary the Diana Motors Company in 1925–1928. Diana motor repair claims and the need to refund government payments from World War I caused a near million dollar loss in 1926. Howard "Dutch" Darrin designed a new car for Moon which would become the Moon Aerotype. In 1928 Moon introduced its first eight-cylinder car.

Another subsidiary produced the Windsor in 1929-1930, the last branded Moon became a Windsor in April 1929. Effects of the Great Depression hampered the company. The company decided to build the Ruxton automobile but boardroom troubles resulted in Windsor and Ruxton both ending production in 1930. The Moon Motor Car Company ceased trading in 1930, but resolving the finances of the moribund company would take more than two decades.

== Models ==
Trucks
Model	Years	Note
A	1913–19	Delivery Vehicle/Light Truck
B	1913–19	Heavy Truck

Cars
Model	Years	Engine	Note
A	1906	Rutenber 4 cylinder	a five-passenger touring car
C	1907–09	Moon 4 cylinder	Mooers designed engine with OHV and cams
D	1908–09	Moon 4 cylinder	Also sold as Hol-Tans in the Eastern US
30	1910–12	Moon or Continental 4 cylinder	George Heising designed engine
39	1913	Moon or Continental 4 cylinder	
40	1912	Moon or Continental 4 cylinder	
45	1910–12	Moon or Continental 4 cylinder	
48	1913	Moon or Continental 4 cylinder	
65	1913	Continental Straight-6	first Moon six cylinder
4-38	1915	Continental 4 cylinder	last Moon four cylinder
4-42	1914	Continental 4 cylinder	
6-30	1916	Continental Straight-6	
6-36	1918	Continental Straight-6	
6-38	1919	Continental Straight-6	
6-40	1915, 1922	Continental Straight-6	
6-42	1921	Straight-6	
6-43	1916–17	Continental Straight-6	
6-44	1916	Continental Straight-6	
6-45	1917–18	Continental Straight-6	
6-46	1919	Continental Straight-6	also called 'Victory'
6-48	1920–22	Continental Straight-6	wire or disk wheels replace wood wheels
6-50	1914–15, 1924	Continental Straight-6	
6-58	1923	Continental Straight-6	
6-60	1927–28	Continental Straight-6	also called the 'Jubilee'
6-62	1928–29	Continental Straight-6	
6-66	1916–19	Continental Straight-6	
6-68	1920–22	Continental Straight-6	
6-72	1928–29	Continental Straight-6	nearly identical to Windsor 6-72
8-75	1928–29	Continental Straight-8	first Moon eight cylinder
8-80	1928–29	Continental Straight-8	'Aerotype' body
Series A	1924–28	Continental Straight-6	
Series U or U6-40	1924	Continental Straight-6	
Newport	1925	Continental Straight-6	
Metropolitan	1925	Continental Straight-6	
London	1925–26		export model
Note: This table is derived from the Curt McConnell reference

== Gallery ==
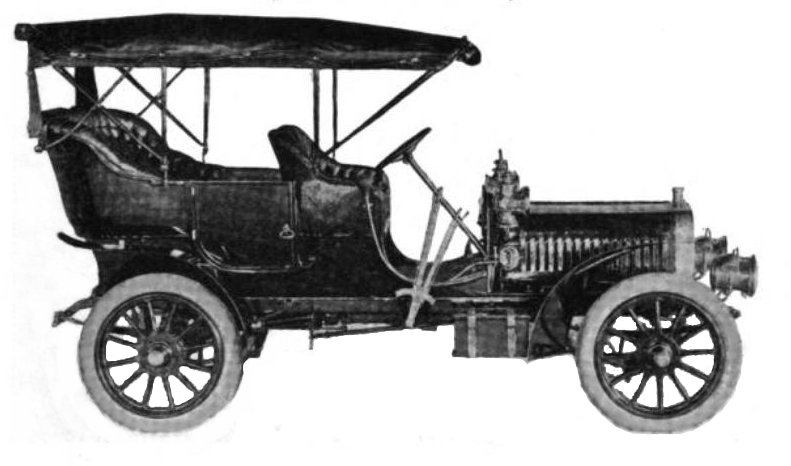
1906 Moon Model A Touring Car

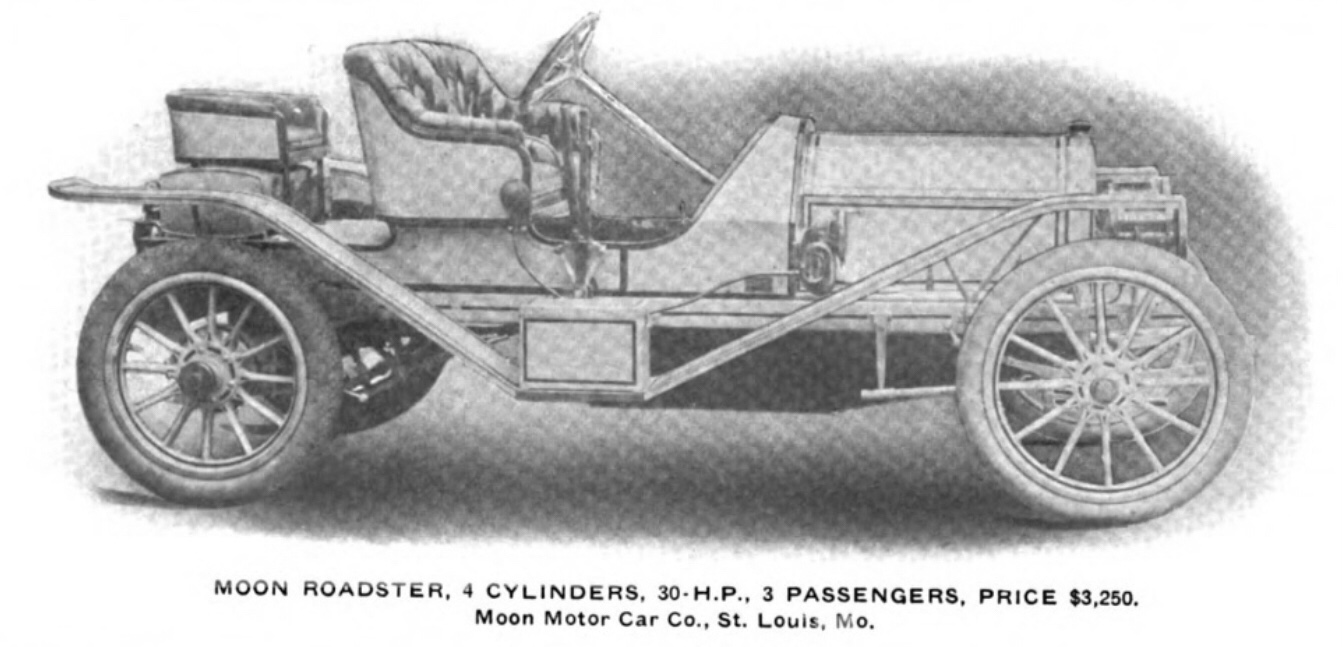
Moon Roadster (1908)

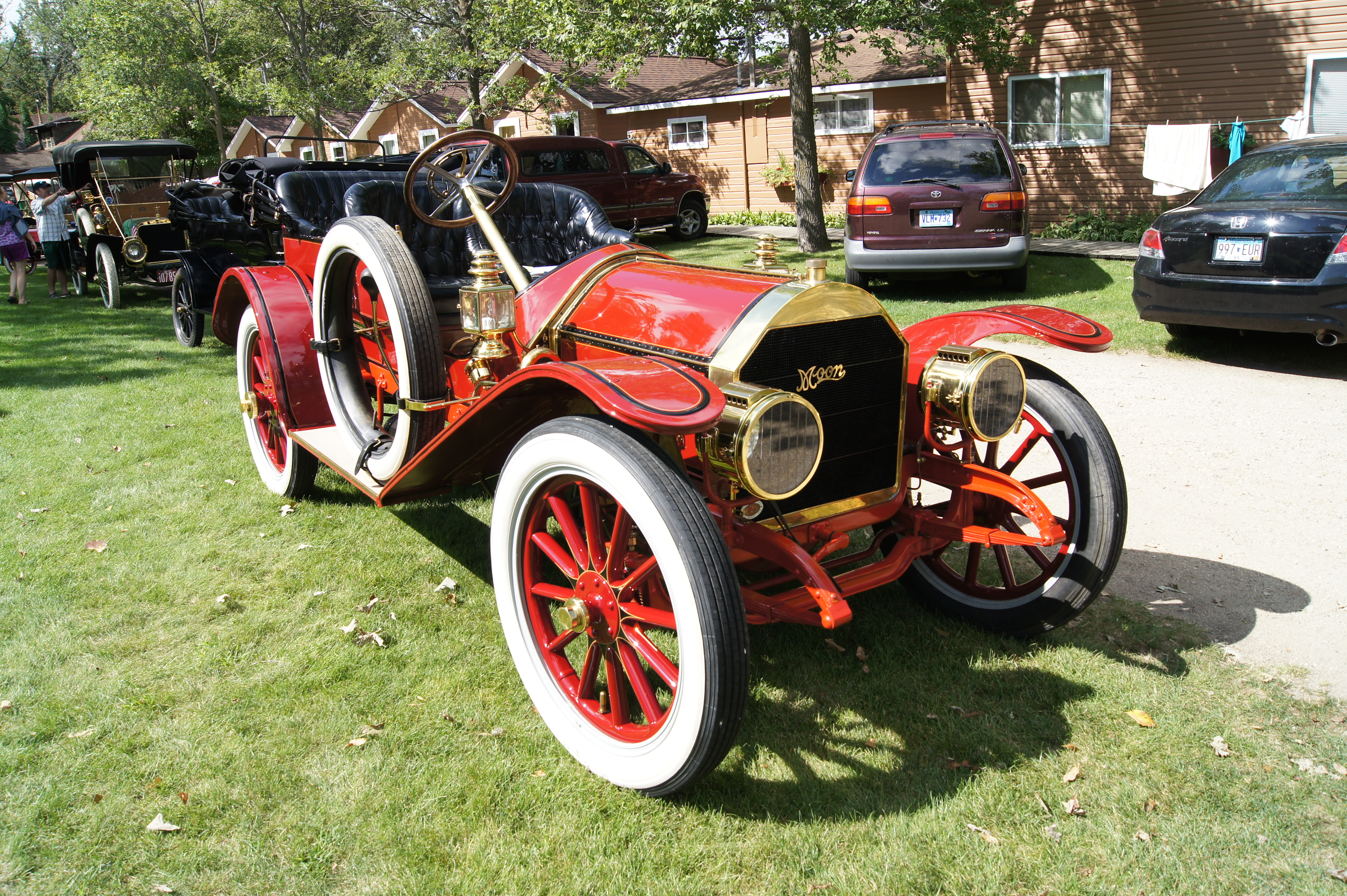
1908 Moon Model C Touring Car

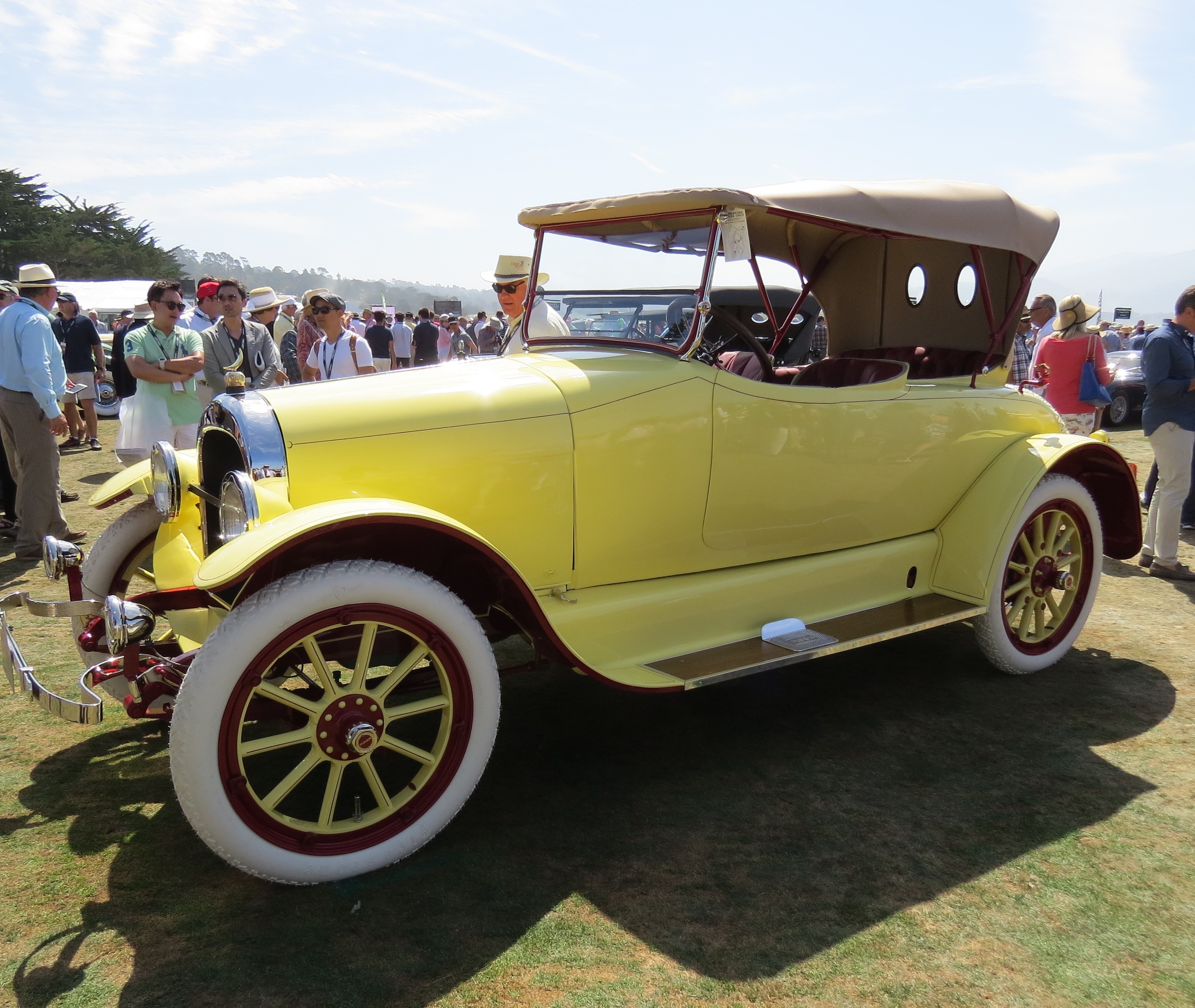
1917 Moon 6-45 Roadster

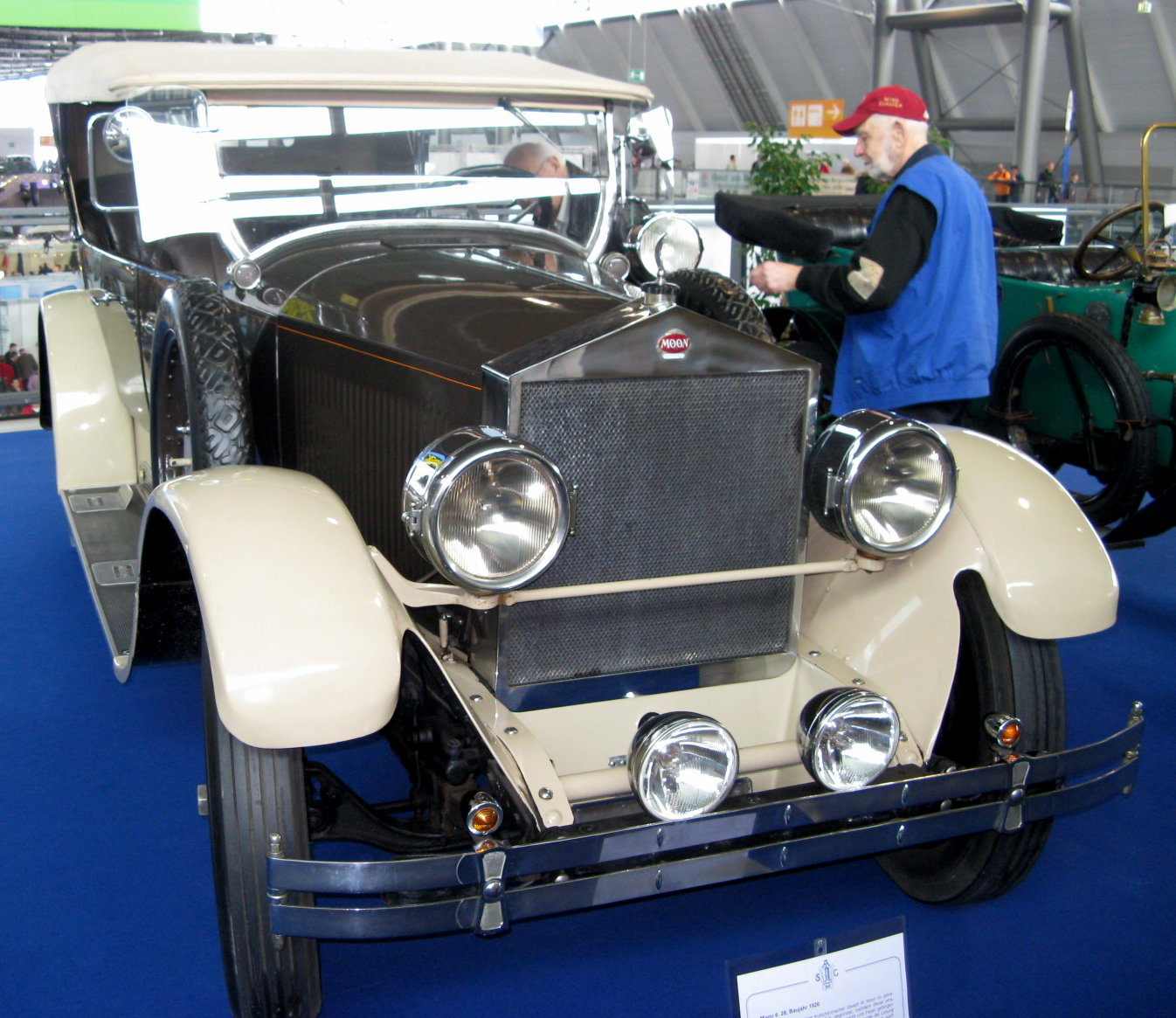
1920 Moon Model 6-28 Touring Car

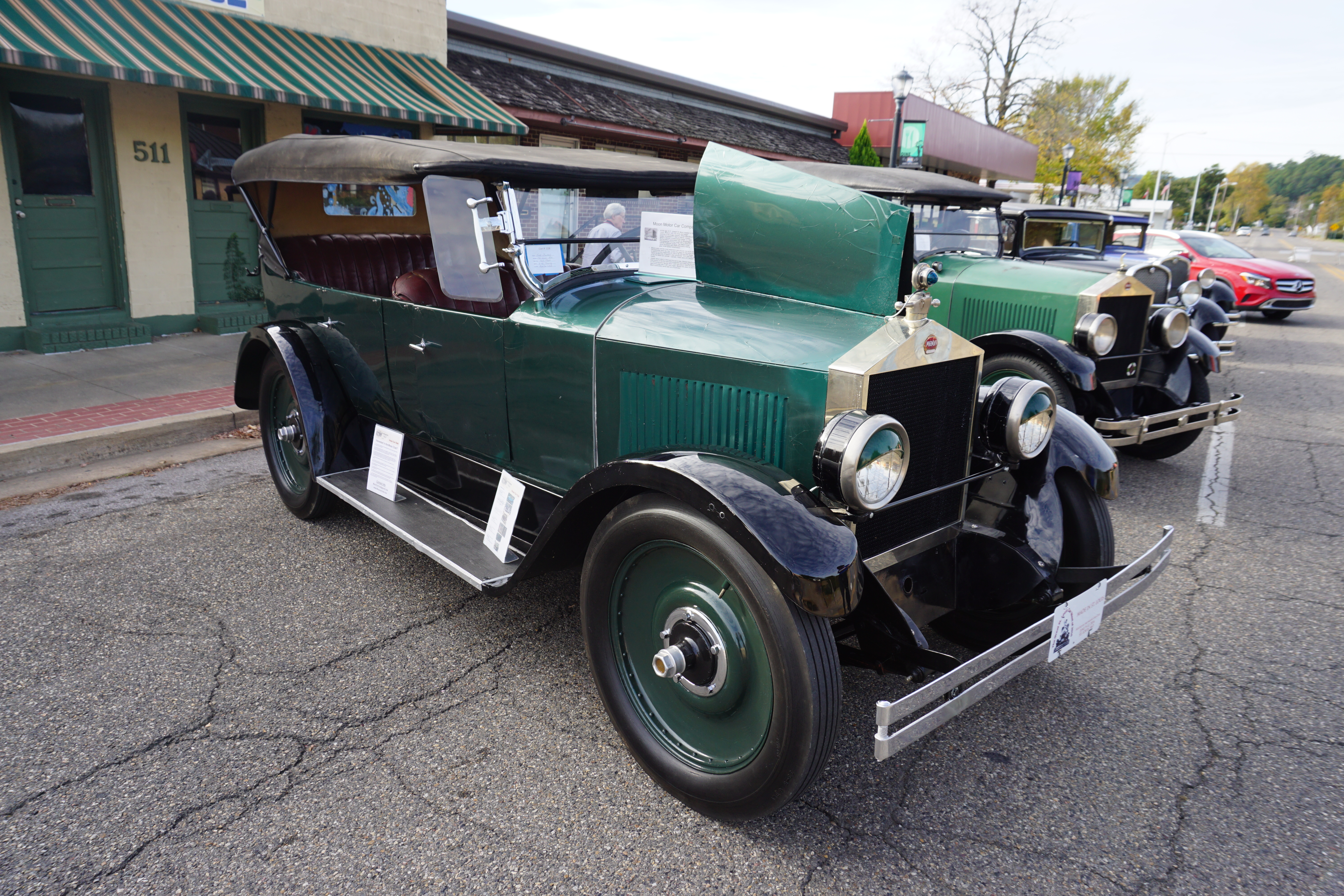
1923 Moon Model 6-40 Touring Car

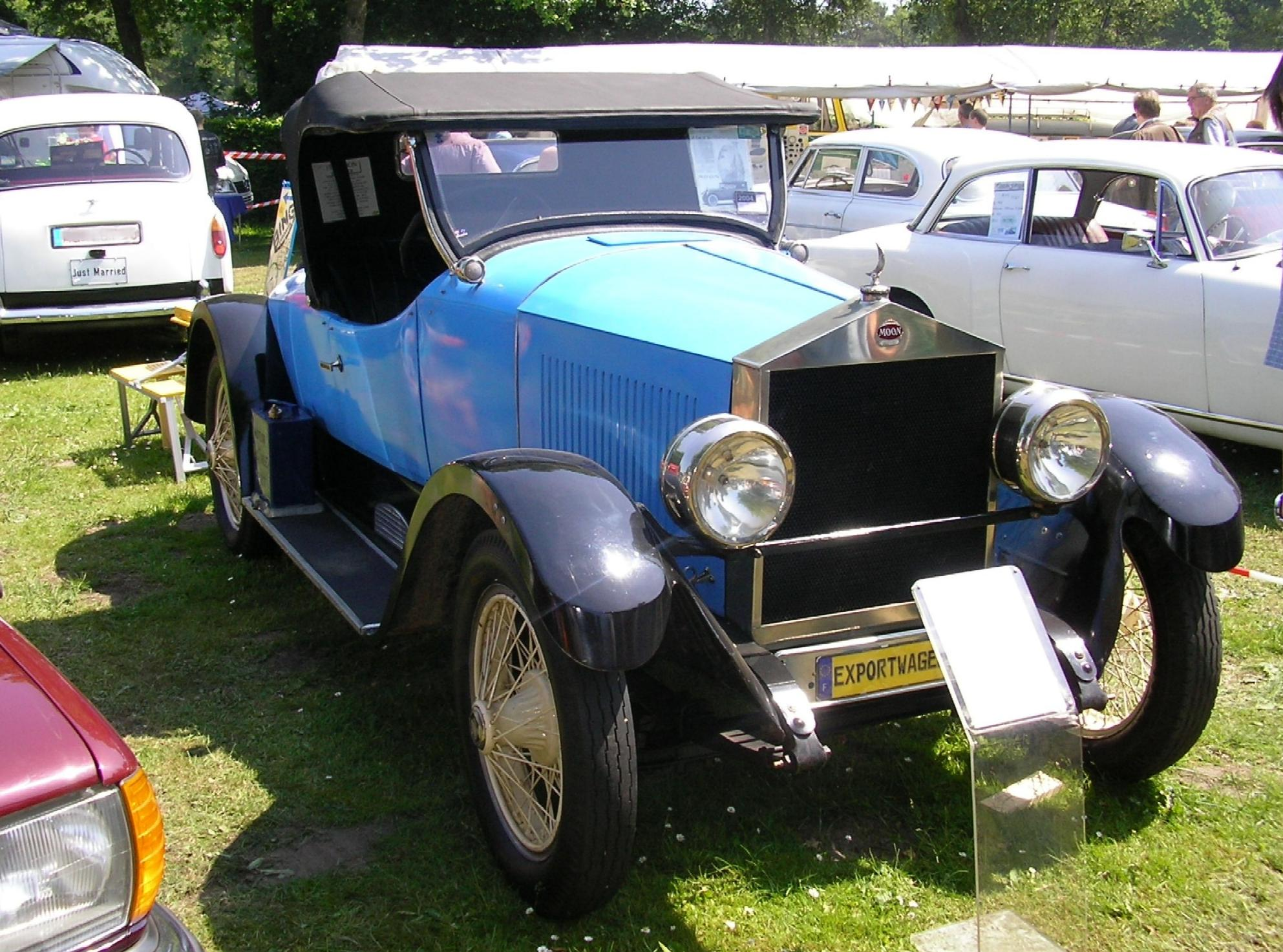
1925 Moon Model 6-40 Roadster

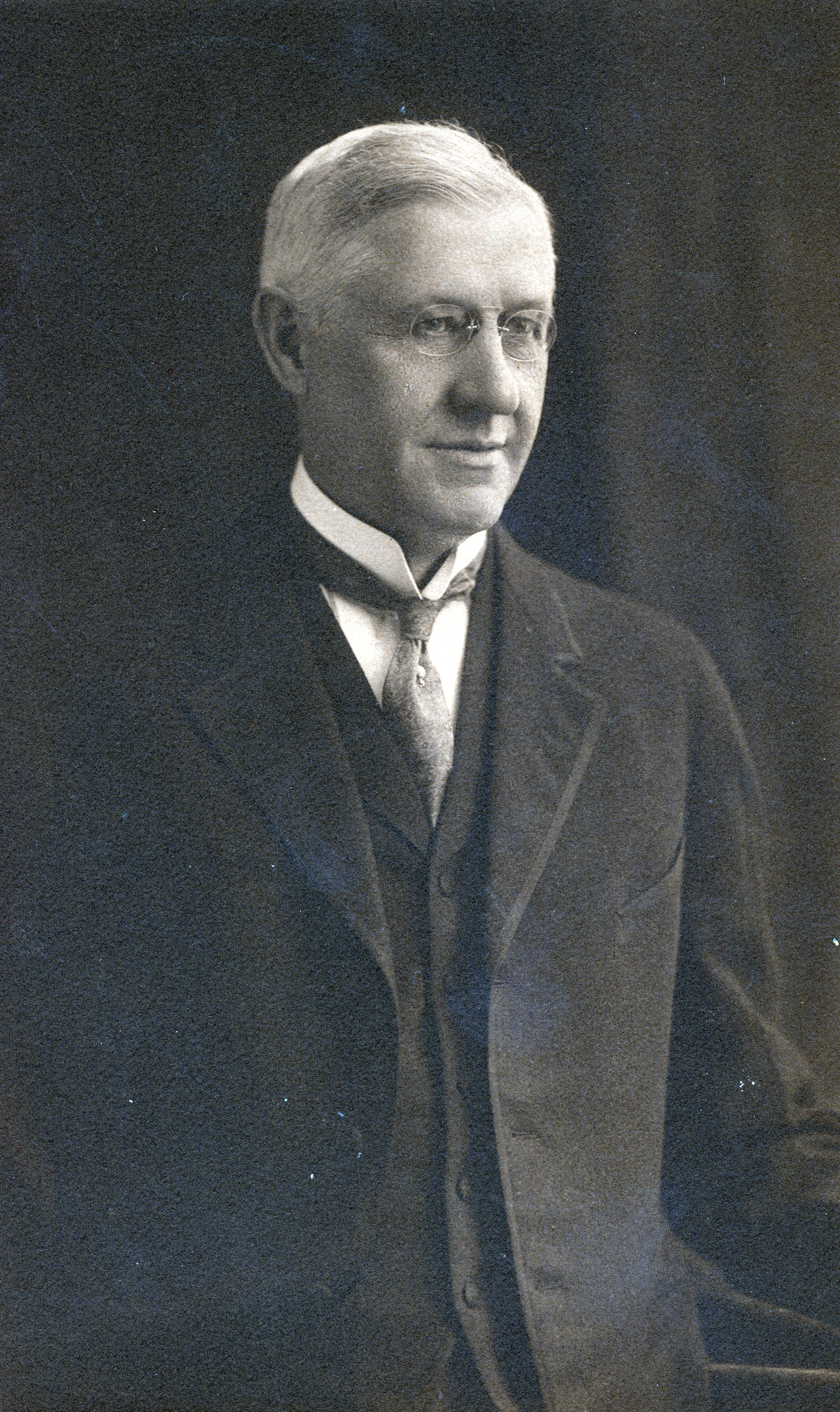
Joseph W. Moon (1915)

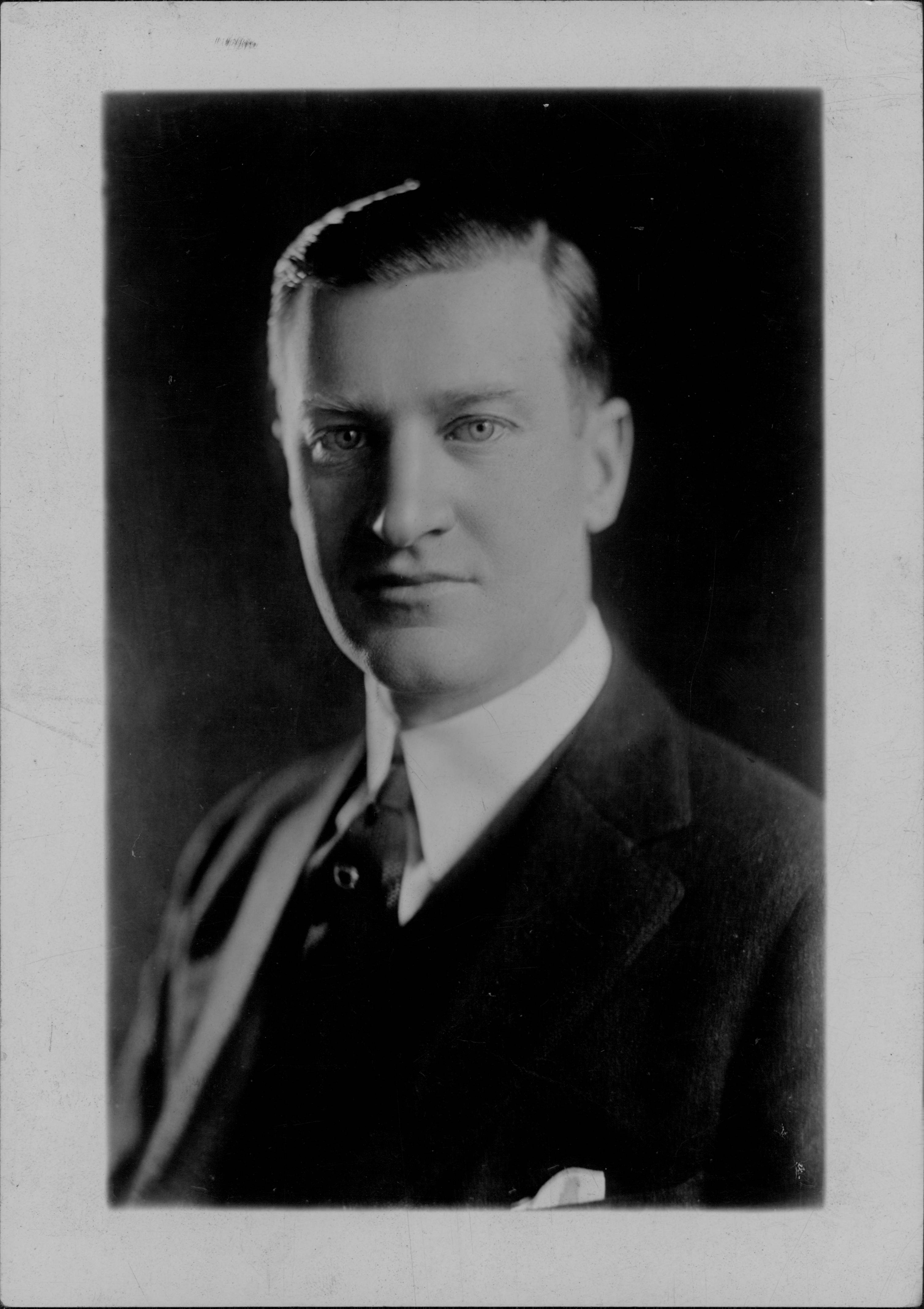
Stewart McDonald (1924)

== See also ==
- Moon automobiles are on display at the National Museum of Transportation in St. Louis, Missouri and the Pioneer Village Foundation Museum in Minden, Nebraska.
- The firm also produced a cotton picker built under contract from the American Cottonpicker Corporation.
- Walt Disney famously had to sell his 1924 Moon Series A Roadster to help finance the production of Steamboat Willie in 1928.
- Moon Automobile Club
- Moon Automobiles at ConceptCarz
