= American (1917 automobile) =

Defunct American motor vehicle manufacturer

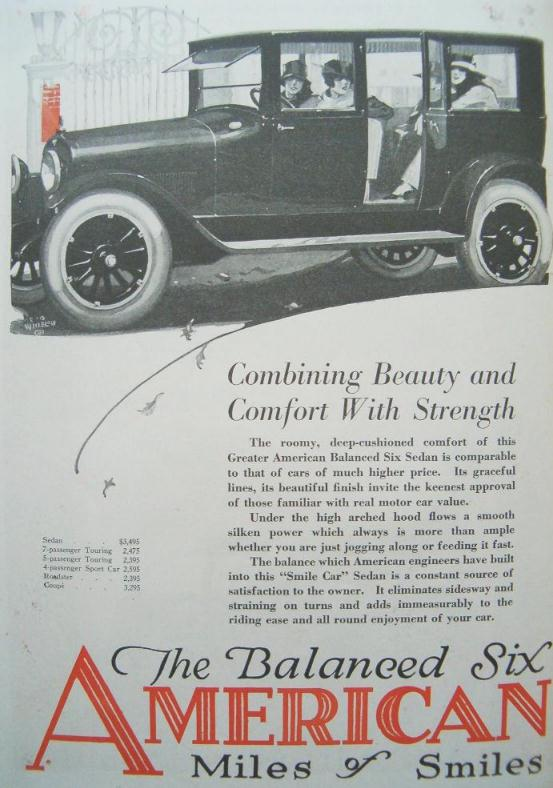
American ad 1921

The American was an American automobile, built in Plainfield, New Jersey, manufactured from 1917 to 1924. The company also used names American Balanced Six or American Six, "Balanced" referred to its chassis, not the engine. It was an assembled car, one of many built in its time, and it used components from several manufacturers like Borg & Beck for clutch, Warner transmission, Stromberg carburetor and Rutenber engines.

The company was never large; its peak production was 1,433 vehicles built in 1920. In that same year a powerful 58 hp Herschell-Spillman six-cylinder engine replaced old 45 hp Rutenber six. American was commonly advertised as a 'Smile Car' because the company believed their cars offered trouble-free miles for their owners. In 1923 the company became associated with the Bessemer Motor Truck Corporation; that October, the company became Amalgamated Motors Corporation, incorporating Northway and Winther as well. Before spring of 1924 American car was out of production. The total number of cars produced was about 6000 cars.

For a brief time, famed racing driver and future automobile designer Louis Chevrolet worked as a vice-president and the head of American's engineering department. During his tenure, an "O.K. Chevrolet" plaque was added to the dashboard of every car.
