= Hol-Tan =

American automobile

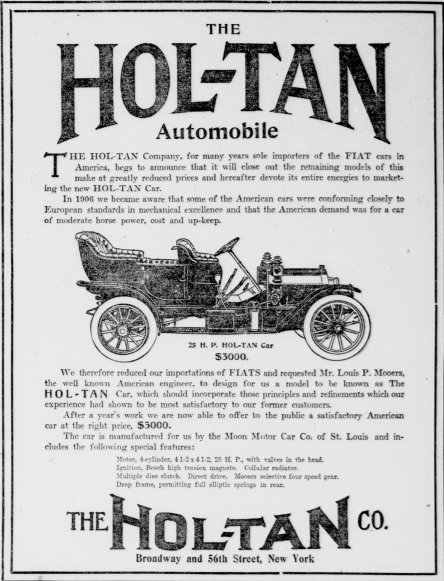
Hol-Tan Advertisement

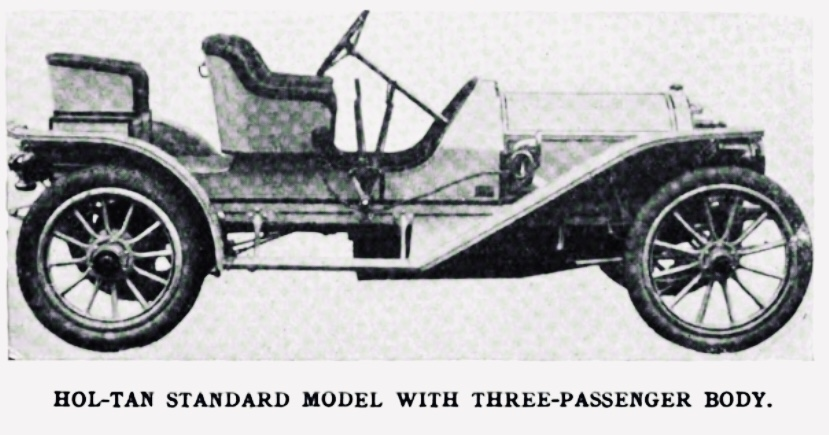
Hol-Tan 32 hp (1908)

The Hol-Tan was an American automobile manufactured in 1908 only.

== History ==
The Hol-Tan company was established in 1906 by G. P. Tangeman, Cornelius Hoagland Tangeman and E. R. Hollander as an automobile dealership in New York City. This incorporation switched their unofficial (since 1902) importation of FIATs to an official status. Hol-tan later announced that it had given up the Fiat license and would now concentrate on selling American cars only. In fact, FIAT had revoked Hol-Tan's license, in preparation for the launch of FIAT production in Poughkeepsie, New York.

The new Hol-Tan automobile was built by the Moon Motor Company of St. Louis, Missouri. Moon's C and D models were shipped to the Hollander & Tangman company of New York City and sold under the Hol-Tan name. Some cars received custom bodies in New York by Locke, Quinby and Demarest, but most were standard Moons with a new name. Hol-Tans cost $3000 or more; expensive for the time.

The company had planned to create a desirable image by taking their cars racing, but this never happened. Although Hol-Tan was the first U.S. company to enlist for the 1908 New York to Paris Race, they never provided an auto for it. The company also entered the AAA Reliability Run in the summer of 1908, though they substituted a Shawmut at the last minute. The reason for using a Shawmut rather than another marque was that the Hol-Tan Company was the New York City dealer of that brand.

The Hol-Tan car was not a great success, having lasted only one year. The following year, Hol-Tan once again became solely an automobile dealership. In 1910, the company turned to dealing in Delaunay-Belleville and Lancia, after Shawmut went out of business. There are no known surviving Hol-Tans.
