= Rutenber Motor Company =

Defunct American motor manufacturer

Rutenber Manufacturing Company Western Motor Company Rutenber Motor Company
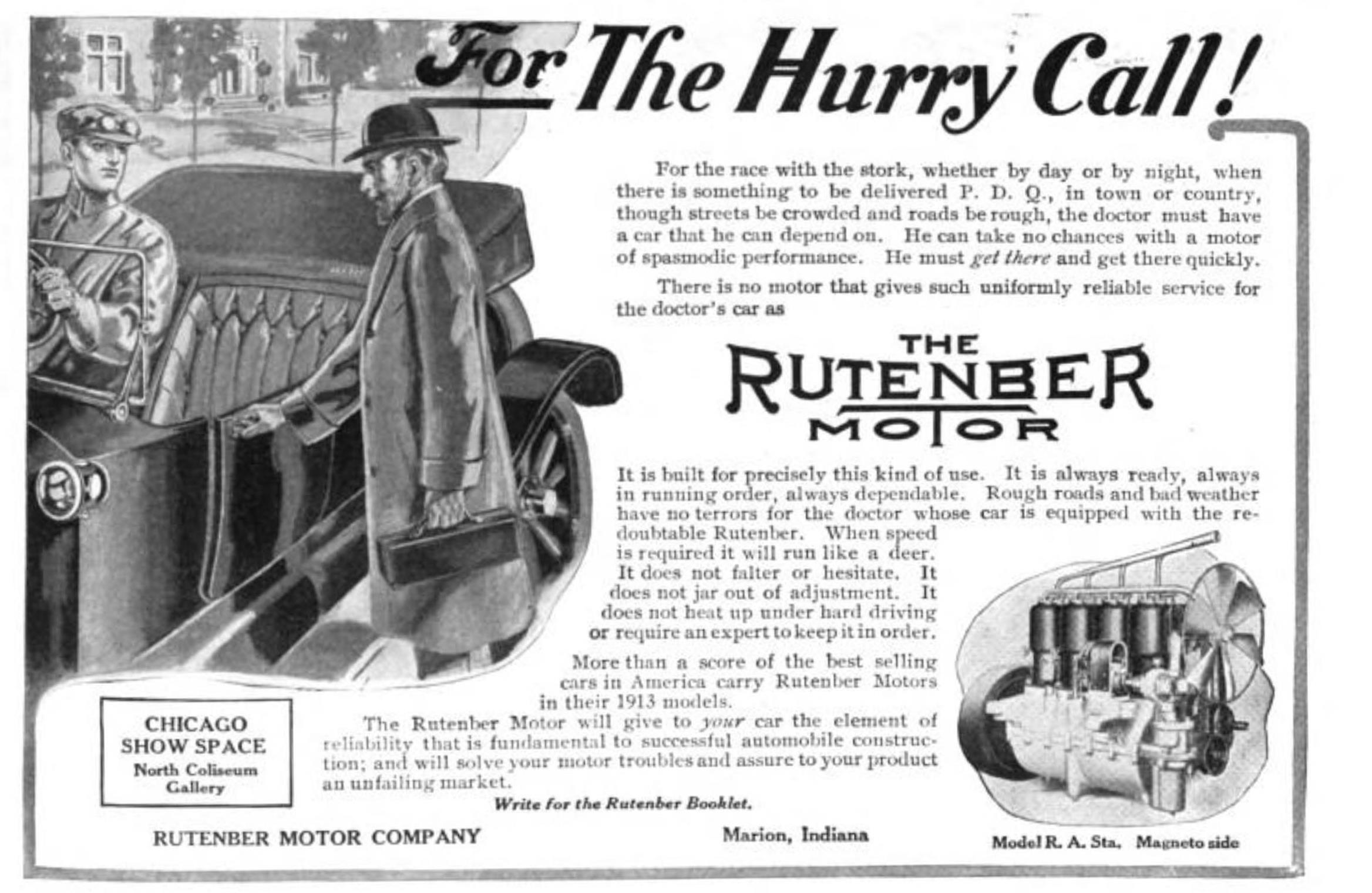
- 1912 Rutenber Motors advertisement
- Industry: Automotive
- Founded: 1908; 118 years ago
- Founder: Edwin A. Rutenber
- Defunct: est. 1933; 93 years ago
- Fate: Closed
- Headquarters: Logansport, Indiana, United States

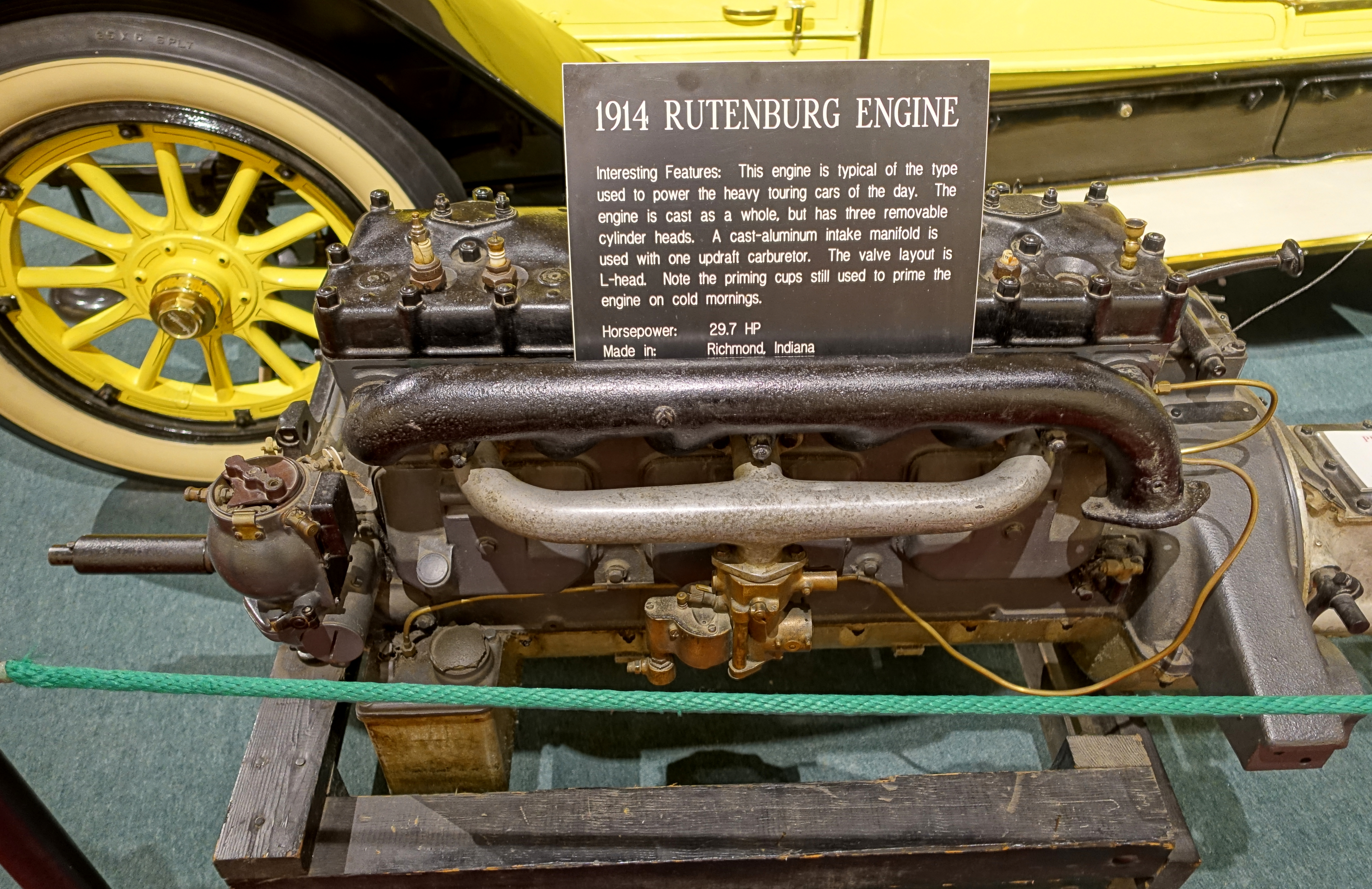
Rutenber engine, 1914

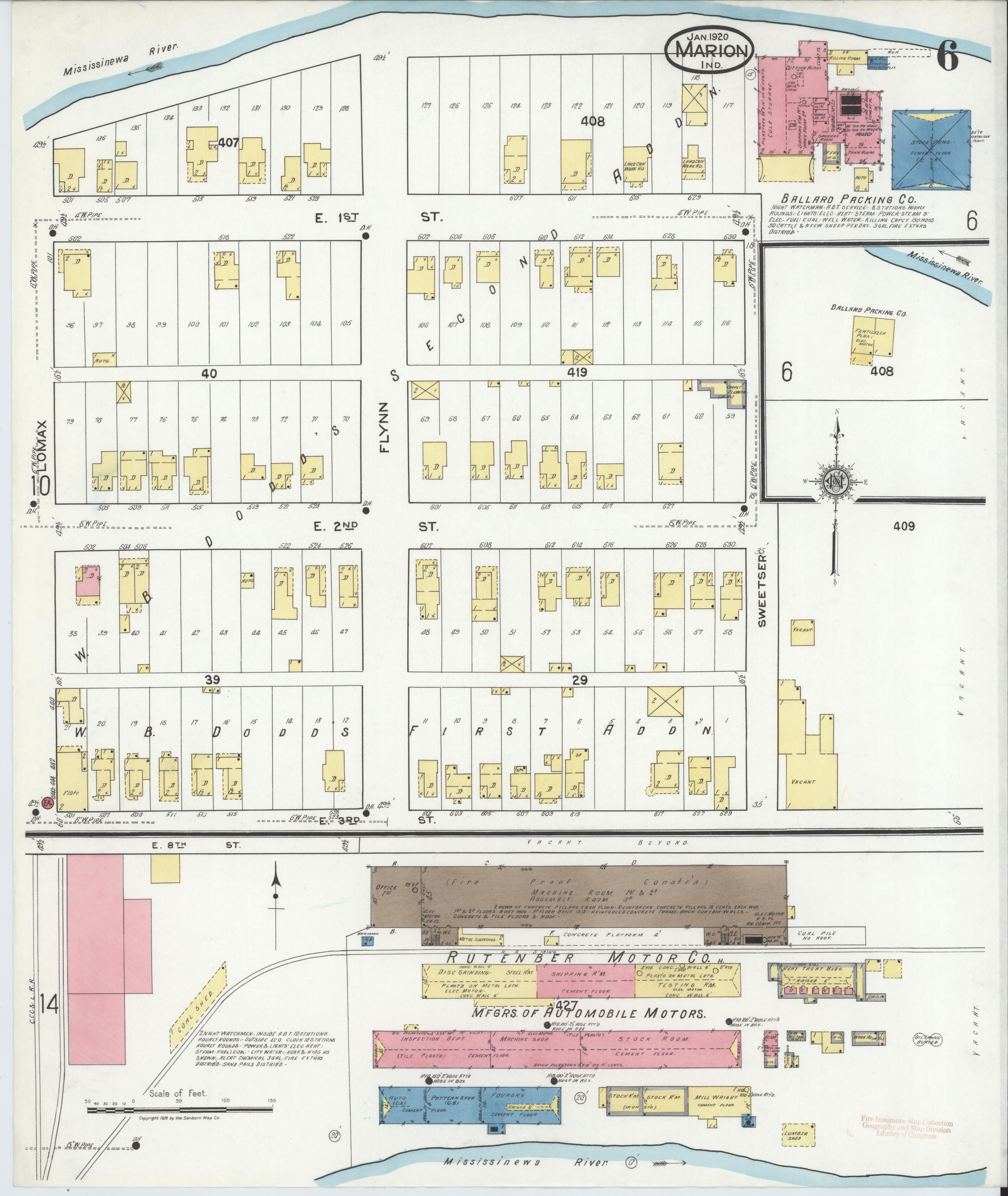
Rutenber plant in Marion, Indiana, 1920

The Rutenber Motor Company was established as the Rutenber Manufacturing Company in Chicago, Illinois, United States, to manufacture a four-cylinder engine to the design of Edwin Rutenber.

== History ==
Rutenber studied the trade of mechanics and, about 1892, built a single-cylinder engine. By 1898, he produced the first four-cylinder engine to be manufactured in the United States. A six-horsepower, single-cylinder engine was used by Frank Eckhart in his 1900 prototype car that was the seed for the Auburn which used Rutenber engines until about 1923.

In 1902, Rutenber relocated his company, renamed the Western Motor Company, to Logansport, Indiana. There, the company designed and manufactured 4- and 6-cylinder engines for the emerging automobile and truck industry. Rutenber himself briefly entered the auto business, creating the Rutenber auto and producing as few as 10 automobiles. One of those was known to have been designed for C. W. Swift of the famous Chicago meat packing house. He quickly exited the business to focus on engines. By 1907 the company employed three to four hundred men and shipped engines all over the United States.

Rutenber engines were used from 1905 in the Stoddard-Dayton automobiles, which became well known for their speed and power, winning the Indianapolis race in 1909. In 1905, the Moon made its debut in Detroit with a 35 hp four-cylinder engine. In 1913, the Moon was equipped with a six-cylinder Rutenber engine. In 1907, a 60 hp Rutenber engine powered the Meteor that went from Chicago to St. Louis (400 miles (640 km)) in 23 hours. Rutenber engines were also used in a long list of early automobiles: American, Burg, Glide, Halladay, Jewel, Lexington, Luverne, Nyberg, Roamer and Westcott and were exported for use in the Australian Six. They were also found in early Indiana trucks, De Berry airplanes, Wetmore tractors, Howe fire pumpers, marine applications, and many were used to power carnival carousels.

In 1912, Edwin Rutenber sold his interest in the company and the rights to the name and severed further connection to it. The company was renamed The Rutenber Motor Company. Edwin Rutenber then turned his attention to the manufacture of electric appliances, establishing The Rutenber Electric Co. "RECO", to exploit the rapid electrification of the nation.

In December 1926, A. C. Barley, President of Roamer Motor Car Company, bought Rutenber Motor Company and its Logansport, Indiana plant. A. C. Barley had been an officer at Rutenber years earlier and the Barley family had been large shareholders in the company. It is thought the company closed around 1933.

In 1973, a Rutenber descendant donated a Rutenber engine to the Smithsonian Institution.

== See also ==
- Edwin Rutenber
- Edwin Rutenber and Western Motor Company- Cass County History
- Rutenber advertisement at Chuck's Toyland
