= Artúr Lajos Halmi =

Hungarian painter (1866–1939)

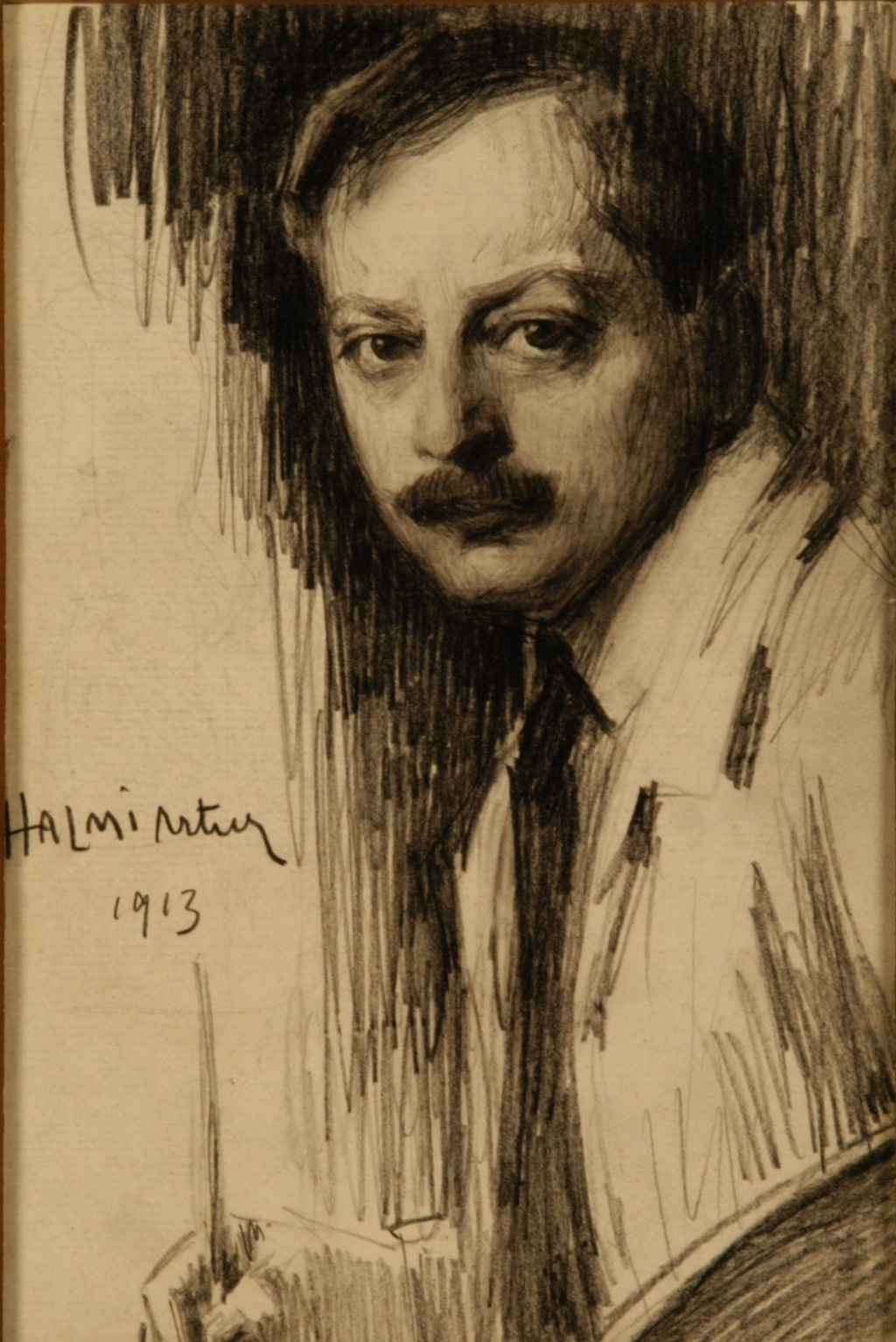
- Born: Artúr Lajos Halmi; 1866; Budapest
- Died: December 3, 1939 (aged 72–73); New York, New York

Artúr Lajos Halmi (1866 – December 3, 1939) was a Hungarian painter who has several works on display in the Hungarian National Gallery. A student of Mihály Munkácsy, he was internationally famed for his portraits. His portraits of opera singers led a 1979 history of the Metropolitan Opera House to note that "What Van Dyck was to the Stuart kings, Artur Halmi was to the sopranos of the first third of this century. He was the prima donna's best friend". He received medals for his artwork in Antwerp, Budapest and Paris.

== Early life ==
Halmi was born in Budapest in 1866. Although he had planned to enter a Polytechnic College, he instead focused his higher education on music. While focusing his career hopes on the violin, he also began to draw as a hobby and to take drawing classes in Budapest. Halmi relocated to Vienna in 1883 intending to enter a musical academy. There, artist Hans Makart agreed to take Halmi as a protege. Makart's premature death in 1884 led Halmi to register in the Vienna Maler Akademie.

== Career ==
In 1886, Halmi moved to Munich, and in 1887 his schoolroom painting "After the Examination" achieved the Munkacsy Prize, winning six thousand francs and a scholarship to Paris. The work was purchased by the Hungarian National Museum in Budapest.

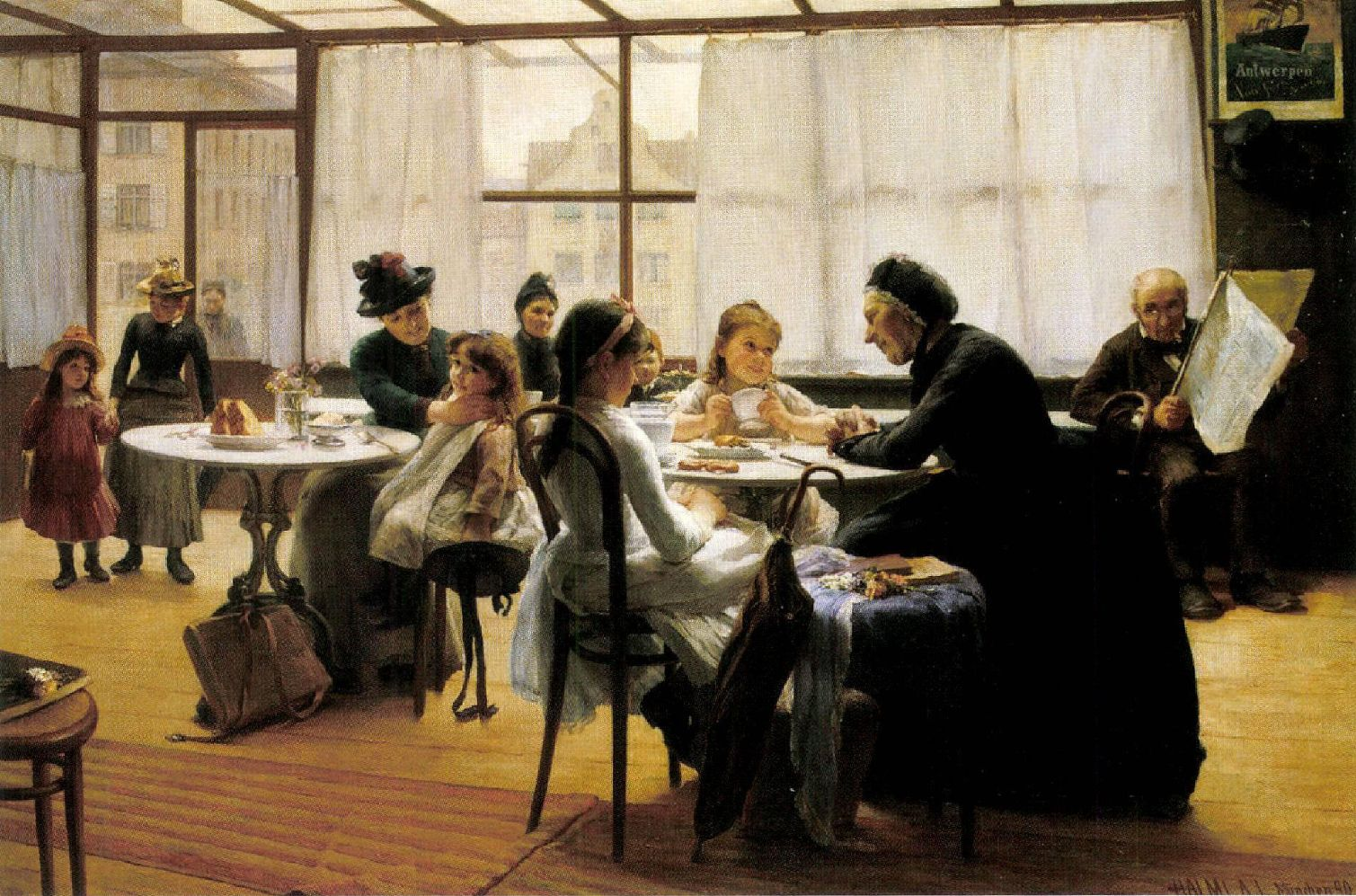
Halmi's painting "After the Examination" (1886) brought wide acclaim and secured his artistic career.

Halmi went to study with Munkacsy and continued painting successful works, including one purchased for the collection of Franz Joseph I of Austria. During this period, he won the Grand Gold Medal at Antwerp, the Millennium Medal in Budapest and a medal with honorable mention at the Paris Salon. On his return to Budapest in 1894, he began taking commissions, spending a year at the Esterházy castle painting portraits of the other artists, musicians and men of letters who gathered there. Eventually tiring of the hectic life of the court, he relocated to Munich and worked for two years for Jugend magazine, until he took the commission to create illustrations for the golden jubilee memorial volume for Franz Joseph. In the span of a few months, he produced over 300 portraits for the work. Thereafter, he became a court painter in Berlin for eight years, securing his reputation throughout Europe. From 1906 to 1909 he lived and worked in Budapest, an acclaimed portraitist.

Halmi's introduction to the United States arose from an acquaintance of his early days in Munich. In the late 1880s, before Halmi had secured his reputation, traveling American Cornelius Hoagland Tangeman came upon some of his work on display in Munich and sought him out for private lessons. Impressed by Tangeman's aptitude and in need of money, Halmi gave him instruction for a time before Tangeman returned to the United States to enter business. In 1910, Halmi was still unknown in the United States when he came to visit his former pupil and was commissioned to paint a portrait of Tangeman's wife. The portrait received wide acclaim, leading to Halmi's popular demand as a portrait artist among the upper class and politically powerful of the United States. Among his subjects there, he painted then United States President William Taft and the children of the Guggenheim family.

In spite of his international success, Halmi remained humble, particularly aware of the artistic limitations imposed upon a commissioned portraitist. Compared to portrait artist John Singer Sargent, Halmi was reported in 1914 to have deferred:

You can't compare me with Sargent, for two reasons – and one is sufficient: I am not a great artist, and he is. Secondly, he is absolutely independent in his portrait painting, while I am just the reverse. What I mean is, I can't help striving to please and to express beauty. Some say that is too easy with the patronage I have and, in a sense, it is true. At the same time, as occasionally happens, when I paint artificial complexions and Paris gowns, and discreetly overlook double chins, and draw figures mostly in imaginary lines, I am thinking of my sitter rather than of myself and of my art. That is not so easy, I assure you. The excuse I then make to my conscience is that, in portraying a lady reputed beautiful, it is not my business to paint her just as I happen to see her at the moment, but rather to try to express and visualize the abiding charm of her personality at its best.

== Death ==
Halmi died on December 3, 1939, in New York City following a long illness. He was survived by his wife, Roszi Kaddish Halmi.
