= Diana Motors Company =

Defunct American motor vehicle manufacturer

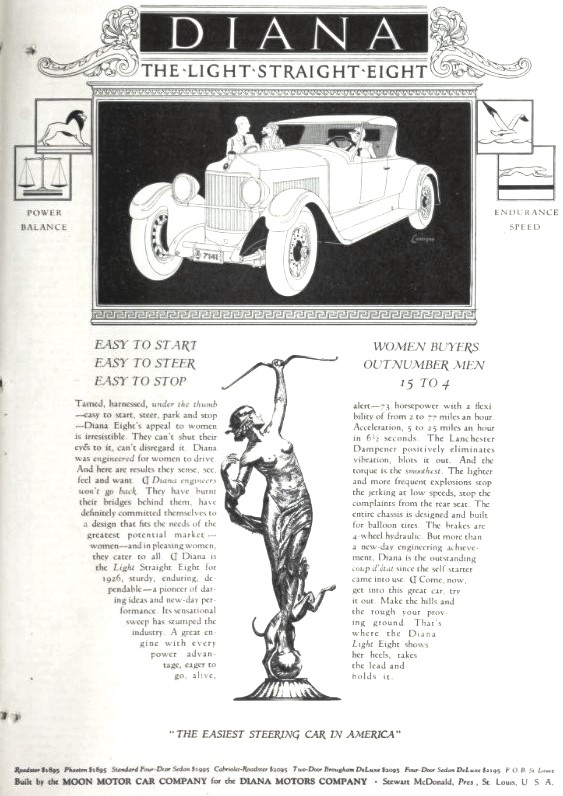
1925 advertisement

The Diana Motors Company was an early United States automobile manufacturing company. The company produced automobiles from 1925 to 1928. The St. Louis based company was a subsidiary of the Moon Motor Car company. The company did not source its own components, rather, it produced "assembled" cars out of third party components. As of 2011, there were 12 known remaining vehicles produced by the company.

The Diana featured a Continental straight-8 engine and was primarily marketed to women. The car was billed as, "The easiest steering car in America". Prices for the 1925 model started at $1,895.

== See also ==
- Windsor (American automobile)
