= Windsor (American automobile) =

Defunct American motor vehicle manufacturer

The Windsor was an automobile produced in St. Louis, Missouri, United States, from 1929 to 1930 by the Windsor Corporation.

== History ==
The Windsor Corporation was a subsidiary of the Moon Motor Car company and shared all the same company officers as the parent company as well as the same manufacturing facility. With Moon sales falling sharply, and the company's other subsidiary, Diana Motors Company, recently folded, it was hoped that Windsor would be an avenue for renewed sales. It was not to be. Moon stopped selling cars under the Moon name in 1929. The Windsor company died a year later.

The Windsor White Prince model originally used the coat of arms of the Prince of Wales in advertising and on the car's radiator emblem and hub caps. When Buckingham Palace objected, the company changed the logo.

== Models ==
The company's only car was called the "Windsor White Prince". It shared many components with Moon models. The model numbers are listed below:

Windsor White Prince Models
Model	Years	Engine	Note
6-69	1929-30	Continental Straight-6	
6-72	1929	Continental Straight-6	Nearly Identical to the Moon 6-72
6-75	1930	Continental Straight-6	
6-77	1929	Continental Straight-6	
8-82	1929	Continental Straight-8	
8-85	1930	Continental Straight-8 with 3-speed transmission	
8-92	1929-30	Continental Straight-8 with 4-speed transmission	

== See also ==
- Ruxton (automobile)
