= Jewell (automobile) =

Defunct American motor vehicle manufacturer

Forest City Motor Car Company Jewel Motor Car Company
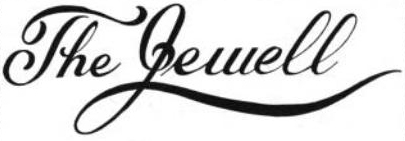

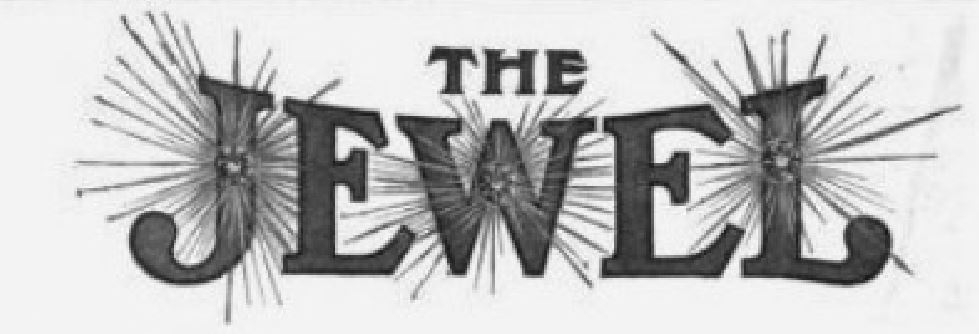
- Industry: Automotive
- Founded: 1905; 121 years ago
- Defunct: 1909; 117 years ago
- Fate: Reorganized
- Successor: Croxton-Keeton Motor Car Company
- Headquarters: Massillon, Ohio, United States
- Key people: Herbert A. Croxton
- Products: Automobiles
- Production output: unknown (1906-1909)

The Jewell Motor Car Company of Massillon, Ohio, formerly the Forest City Motor Car Company, manufactured the Jewell brass era automobile from 1906 to 1909.

== History ==
A prototype automobile was built by Forest City Motor Car Company but investors moved to Massillon and renamed the car the Jewell. The Jewell was a single-cylinder high-wheeler of 8 to 10hp. In 1908 the marque name was changed to Jewel and a 40hp Rutenber 4-cylinder car was added. In 1909 the company name was changed to Jewel Motor Car Company but by the end of the year the company was reorganized as the Croxton-Keeton Motor Company and the Jewel name was dropped.

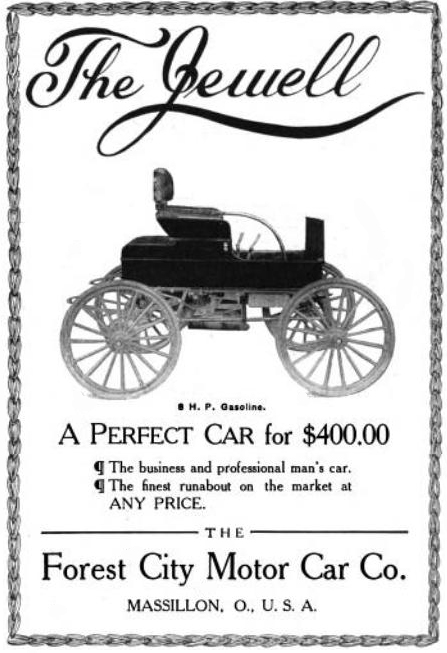
1906 Jewell 8-hp high-wheeler advertisement

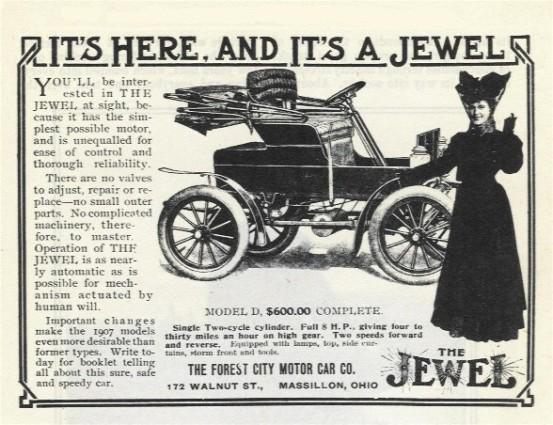
1908 Jewel Model D advertisement

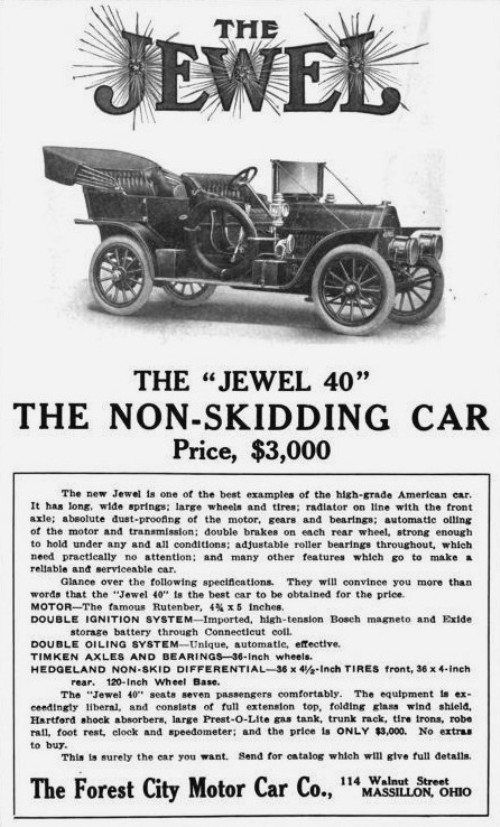
1909 Jewel Model 40 advertisement
