= Luverne (automobile) =

Defunct American motor vehicle manufacturer

Luverne Automobile Company
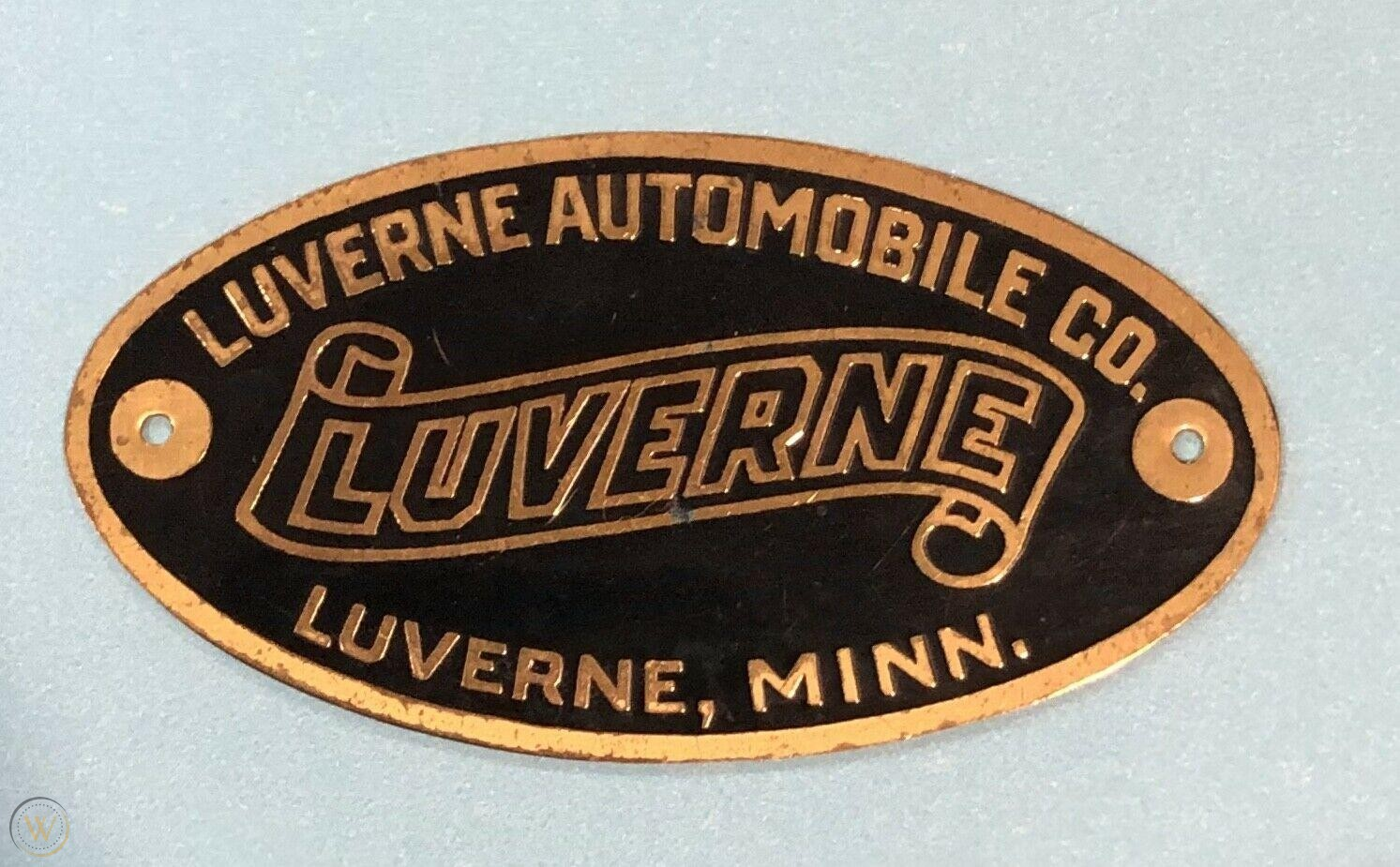
- The Car for the Mountains
- Type: Automobile manufacturer
- Predecessor: Leicher Brothers
- Founded: 1906; 120 years ago
- Founder: Fenton Leicher, Edward Leicher
- Defunct: 1917; 109 years ago
- Fate: Merger
- Successor: Luverne Truck Company
- Headquarters: Luverne, Minnesota, United States
- Products: Automobiles
- Production output: 400 approx. (1904-1917)

Luverne was the marque of the Luverne Automobile Company, which produced automobiles from 1904 to 1917 in Luverne, Minnesota.

== History ==
Carriage makers Fenton and Edward Leicher, began in 1904 to build automobiles to order, in their coach-building factory. In 1903, they experimented with an automobile kit from A. L. Dyke in St. Louis. The first production automobile was a high-wheeler with a two-cylinder Buick engine. Rutenber and Beaver engines would be used in future production. In 1906 the Luverne Automobile Company was formally established.

=== Models ===
In 1905 Luverne high-wheelers were joined by a conventional 20-hp touring car which lasted until 1909. A four-cylinder 40-hp model began production that year, and Luvernes entered the upscale automobile market. The 4-cylinder Model Fifty became the Montana Special in 1912, when Luverne introduced their first six-cylinder car, the Model Sixty.

In 1913, the six-cylinder became the Big Brown Luverne model. This 60-hp Rutenber engine touring car on a 130-inch wheelbase, was painted "Luverne Brown" and had a solid German silver radiator. It was upholstered with "Old Spanish brown leather with all hair filling". In 1914 the Big Brown Luverne model was priced at $2,500, (equivalent to $80,357 in 2025).

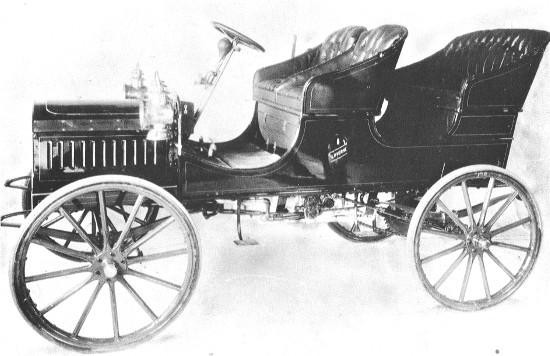
1905 20-hp Luverne High-wheeler Surrey

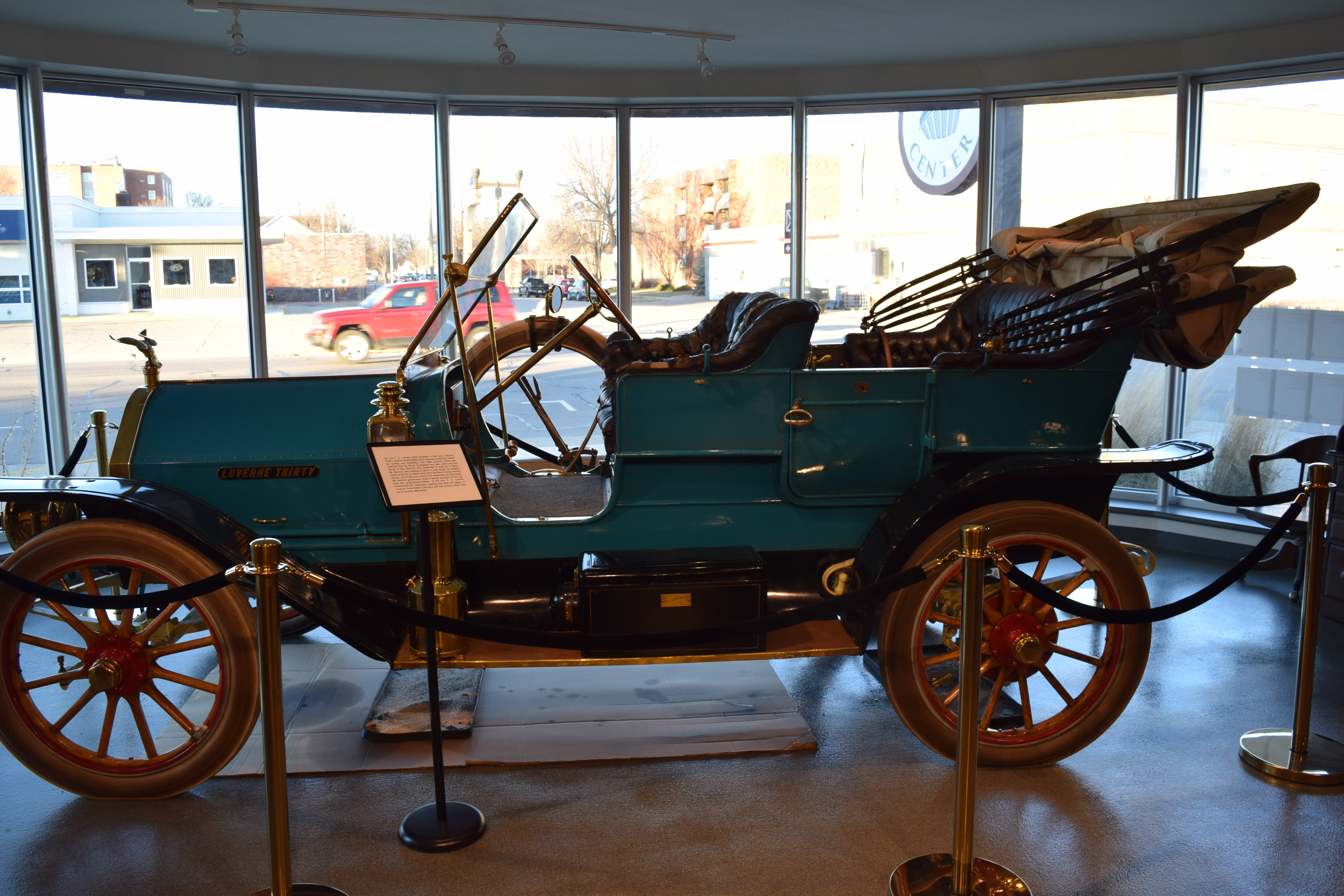
1909 Luverne Thirty at the Rock County History Center

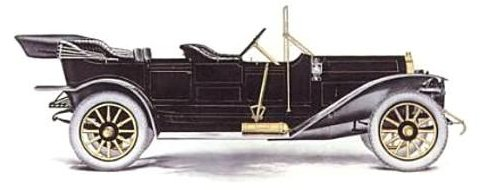
1911 Luverne Fifty - Montana Special

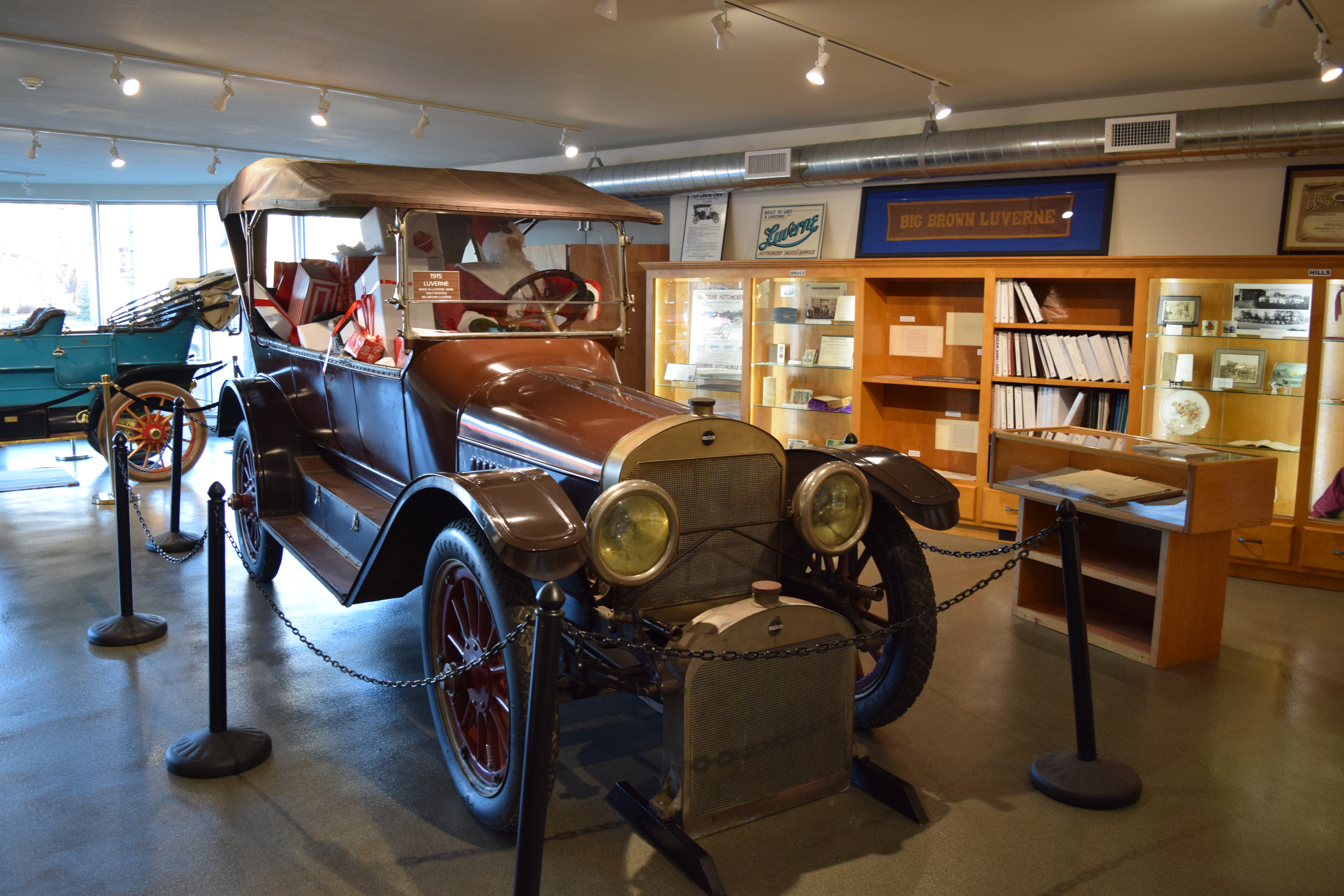
1915 Big Brown Luverne at the Rock County History Center

=== Fate ===
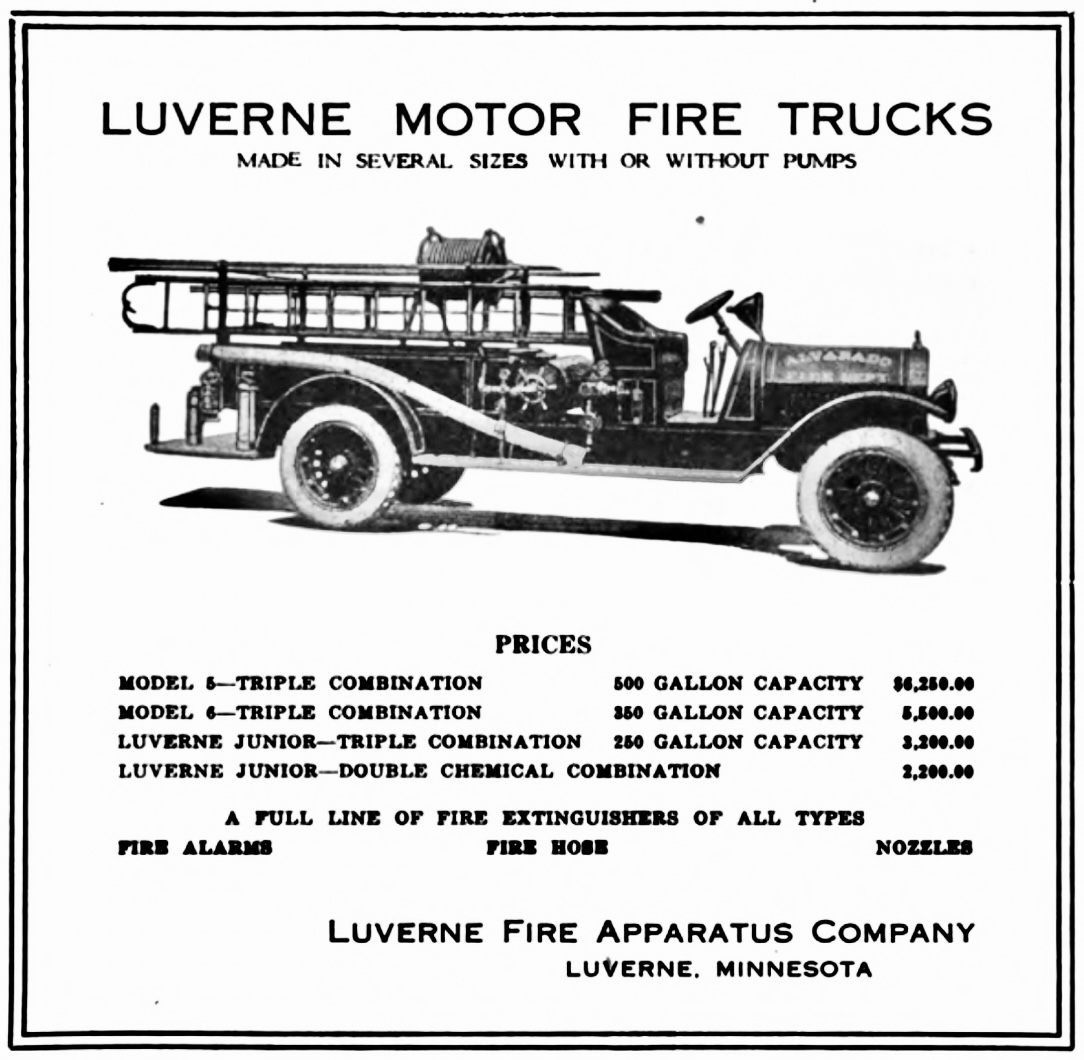
Luverne Fire Apparatus (1922) advertisement

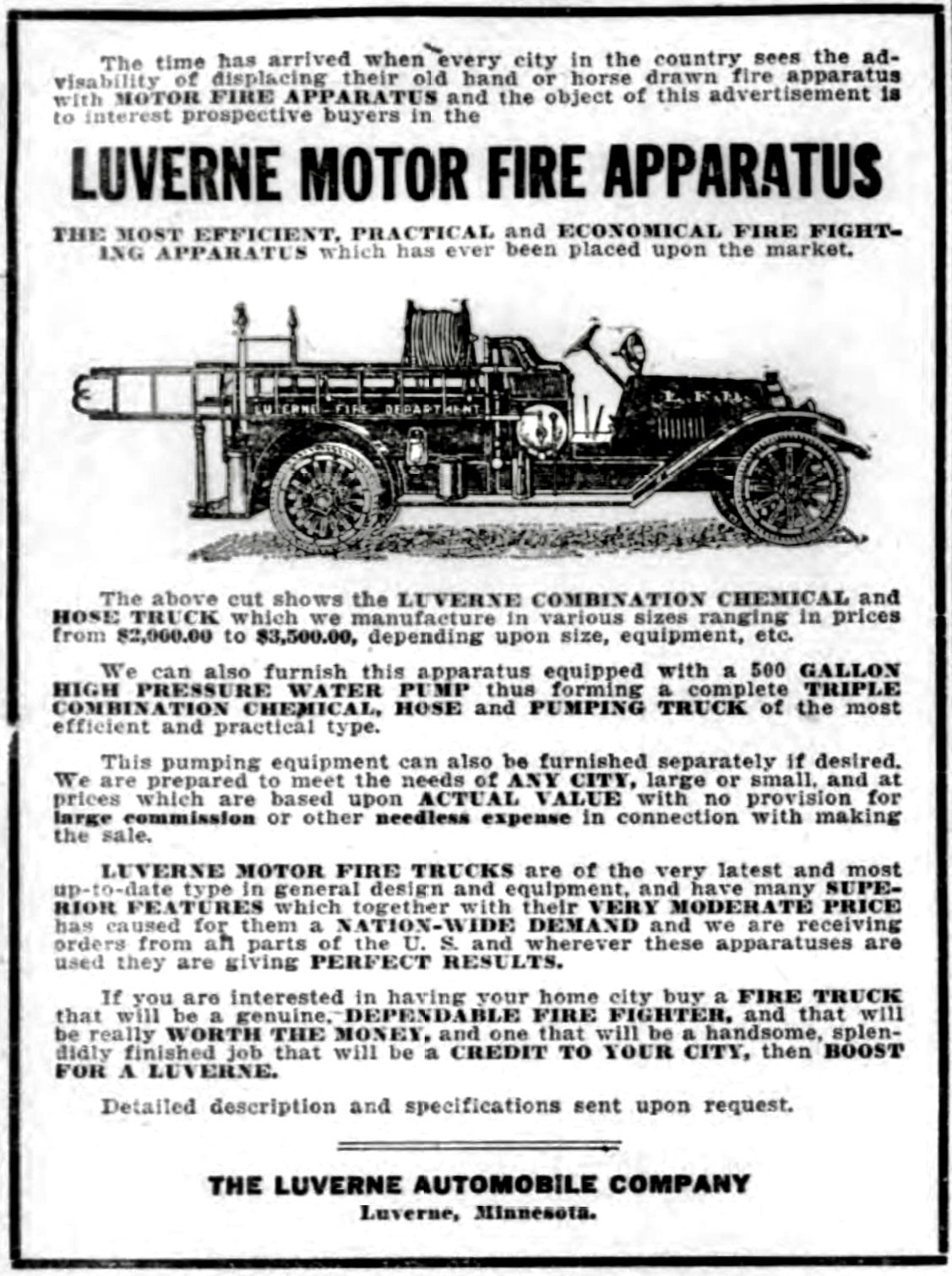
Luverne Fire Apparatus (1917) advertisement

Luverne production averaged 25 cars per year to 1908 followed by 50 cars per year to 1916. 25 Big Brown Luvernes were produced in 1917, and just 1 in 1918. Luverne built coachwork for professional cars on a limited basis and in 1912 entered truck production. Automobiles were discontinued in 1917 and the company was reorganized as the Luverne Truck Company. This company became Luverne Fire Apparatus, producing fire trucks and equipment into the 1970s.

== Advertising ==
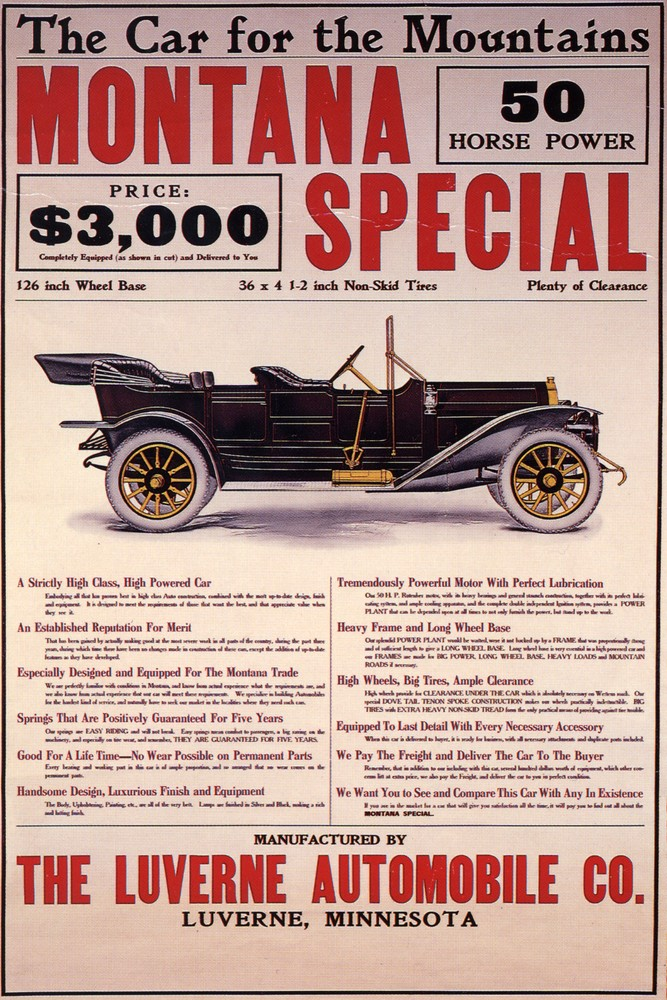
1912 Luverne advertising

Luverne advertising emphasized their strong construction and attractive wood coachwork. Advertising slogans included;

- Cars That Are Worth The Money
- The Best Investment in the Long Run
- They Look Good, They Are Good, and They Stay Good
- Strictly High Grade and Moderate in Price
- The Big Brown Luverne/Eventually You Will Want One
- Good for a Lifetime
- Cars With the Doubt Left Out
- They are Big and Long and Brown and Strong
- The Car for the Mountains

== See also ==
- Brass Era car
- List of defunct United States automobile manufacturers
- Rock County Historical - Luverne Automobiles and Fire Apparatus
- Made in Minnesota - Old Cars Weekly
- Reviving a Luverne - Auto Restorer
- Big Brown Luverne by Harold E Glover - Chuck's Toyland
