= Winther (automobile) =

Defunct American motor vehicle manufacturer

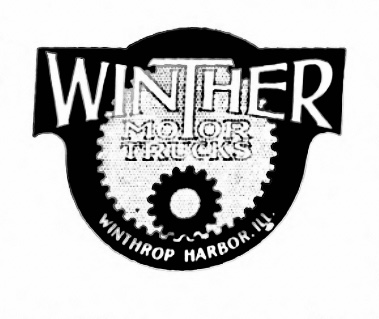
- Type: Truck and car Company
- Industry: Manufacturing
- Founded: 1917; 109 years ago
- Defunct: 1926; 100 years ago
- Headquarters: Winthrop Harbor, Illinois, Kenosha, Wisconsin, US
- Products: Trucks; Automobiles

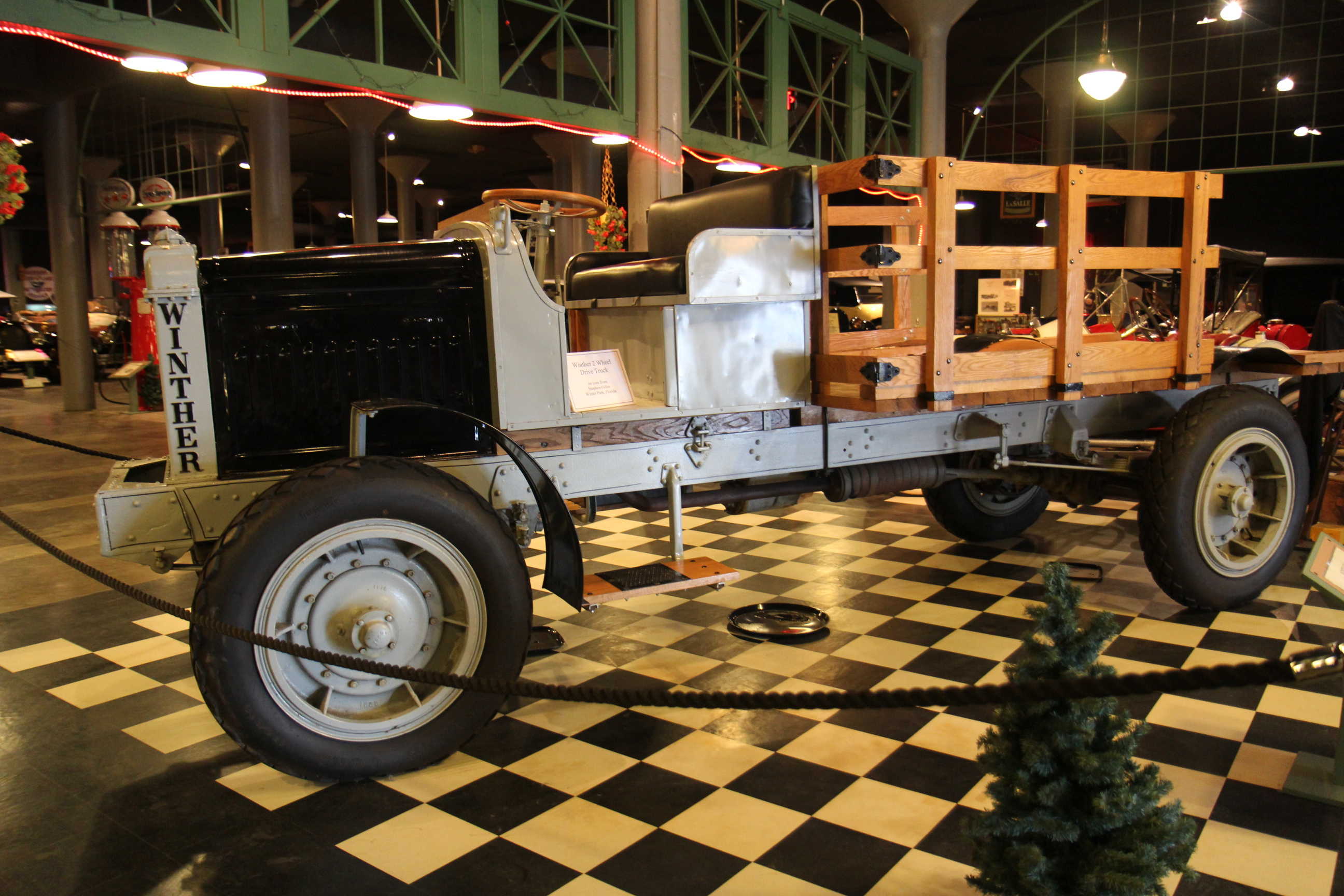
1918 Winther Model 48 stake truck on display at the Wisconsin Automobile Museum.

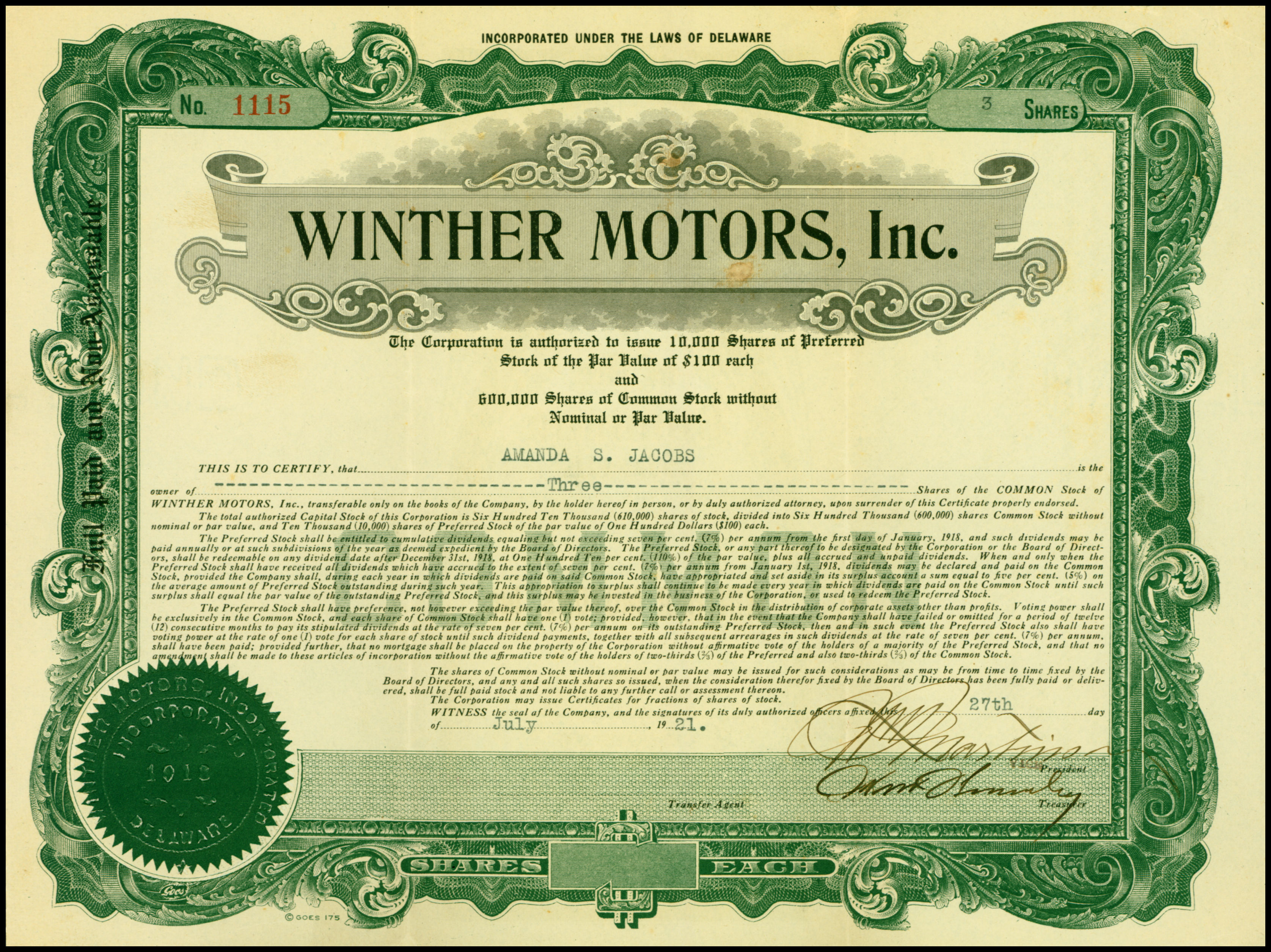
Share of the Winther Motors Inc., issued 27. July 1921

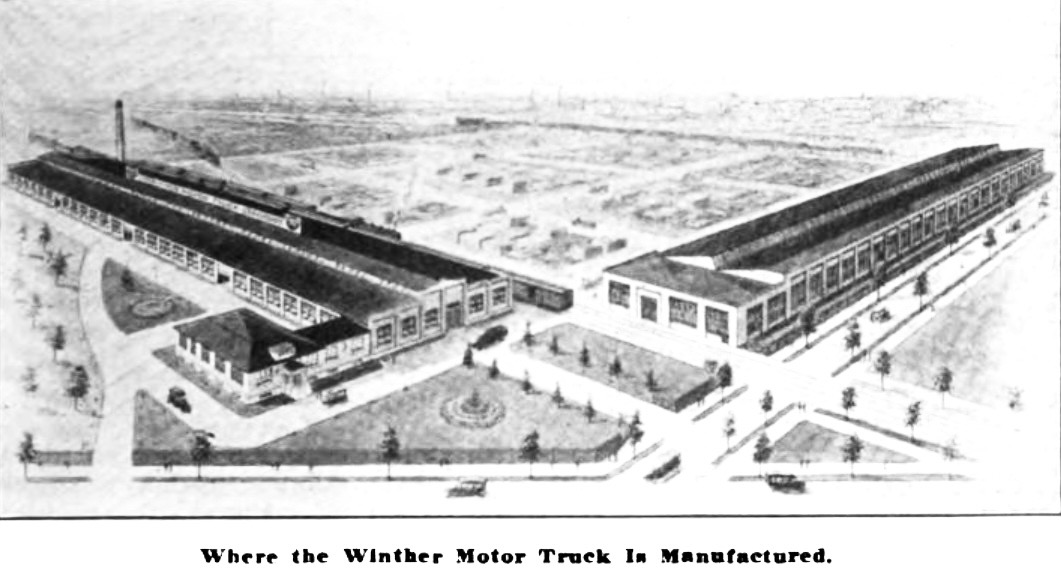
Winther plant (1922)

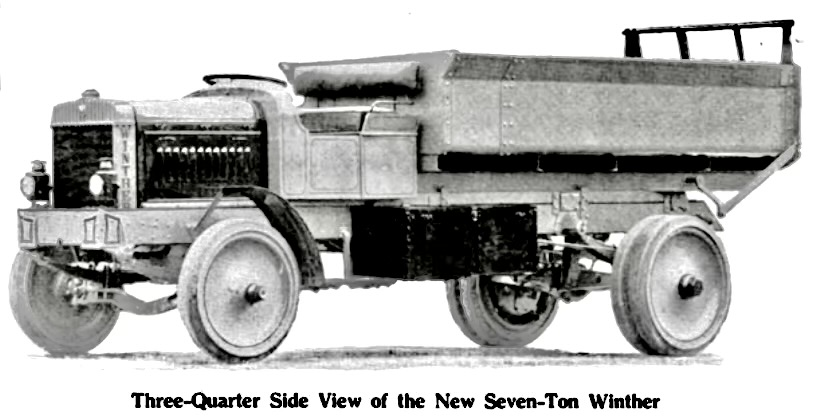
Winther Model 148 (1918) 7 to

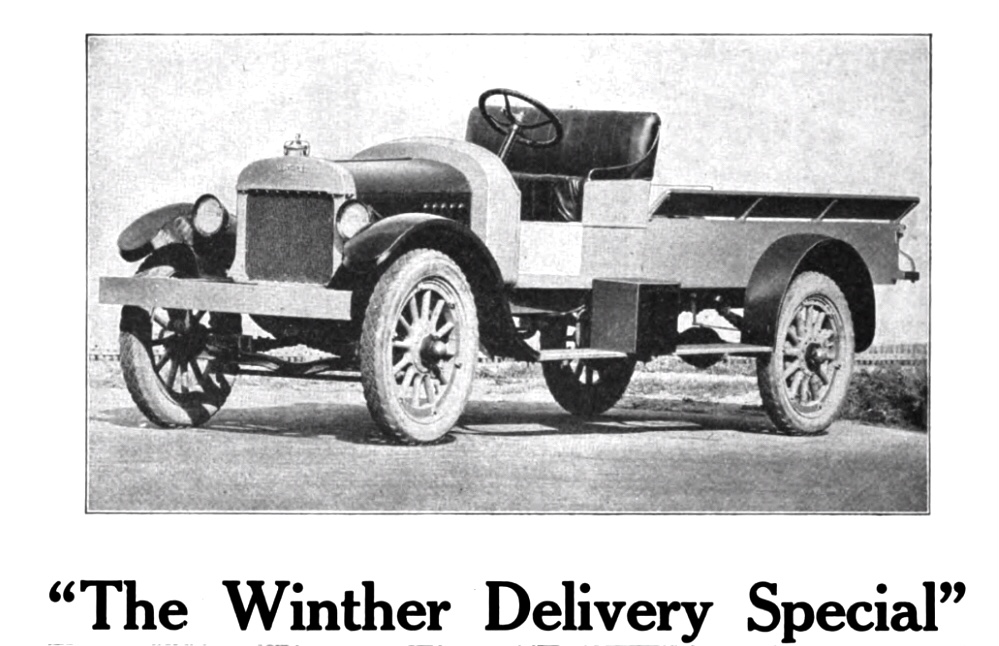
Winther Delivery Special (1920)

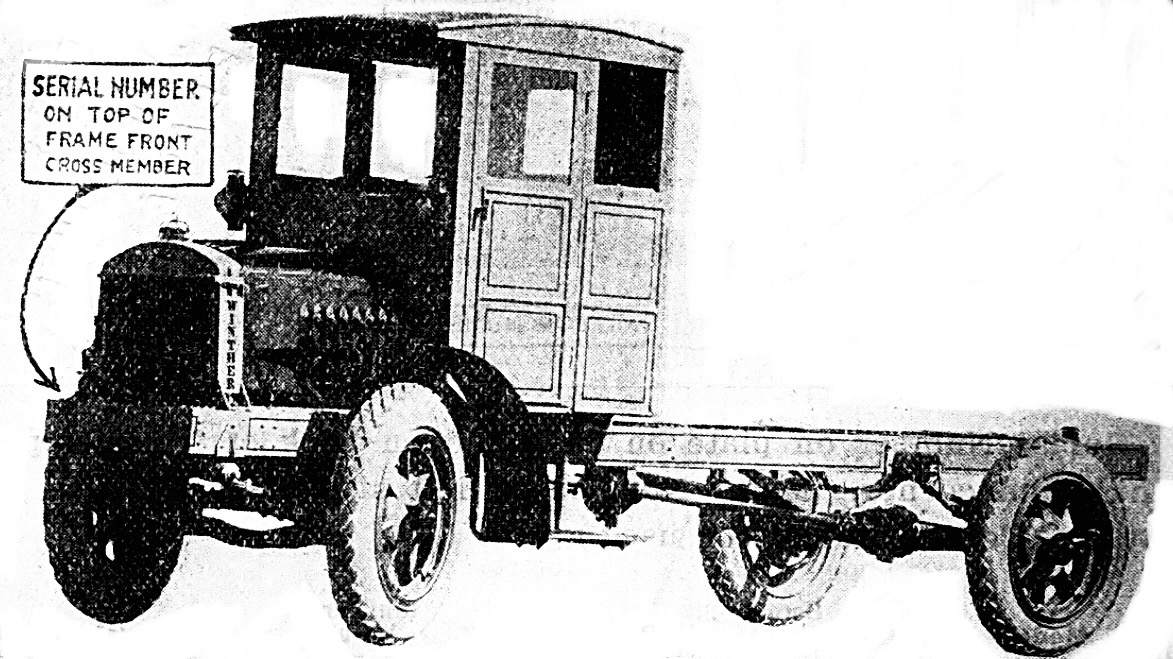
Winther Truck (1925).

The Winther was an automobile manufactured in Winthrop Harbor, Illinois and Kenosha, Wisconsin, USA, by the Winther Motors Sales Corporation between 1920 and 1923. The company had been building trucks and fire appliances since 1917, and decided to broaden its production.

The Model Six-61 was a 5-passenger touring car that was powered by a Herschell-Spillman 11000 six-cylinder engine. The Six-61 had a 120-inch wheelbase, and sold for $2890. "Designed for critic - Built by mechanics" was the advertising slogan for the Model Six-61.

The price for the Six-61 was reduced to $2250 for 1922, but production was discontinued in early 1923 after 336 cars had been built.

The body patterns were sold to GD Harris of Menasha, Wisconsin, who continued production of the car as the "Harris Six".

== Overview of production figures ==
Year	Production	Model	Engine displacement	HP
1917	56	47 (2 t)	5,148 cc	25.6
	62	67 (3 t)	5,148 cc	25.6
	58	87 (4 t)	8,340 cc	32.4
	15	127 (6 t)	9,498 cc	42.0
1918		28 (1 t)		
	200	48 (2 t)	5.148 cc	25.6
	149	68 (3 t)	5,148 cc	25.6
	20	88 (4 t)	8,340 cc	32.4
	59	108 (5 t)	8,803 cc	36.1
	31	128 (6 t)	9,498 cc	42.0
	42	148 (7 t)	9,498 cc	42.0
		438 (1,5 t)	cc	
1919	50	39 (1,5 t)	4,826 cc	22.5
	133	439 (1,5 t)	4,505 cc	19.6
	10	49 (2 t)	5,148 cc	25.6
		69 (3 t)	5,148 cc	25.6
	10	479 (3,5 t)	8,340 cc	32.4
	1	89 (4 t)	8,340 cc	32.4
		109 (5 t)	8,803 cc	36.1
		129 (6 t)	9,498 cc	42.0
		149 (7 t)	9,498 cc	42.0
	4	979 (3,5 t)	5,734 cc	32.4
	4	4749 (2 t)	3,153 cc	19.6
1920		39 (1,5 t)	4,826 cc	22.5
		430 (1,5 t)	4,505 cc	19.6
		751		
		420		
		450		
		70		
		140		
		49 (2 t)	5,148 cc	25.6
		69 (3 t)	5,148 cc	25.6
		479 (3,5 t)	8,340 cc	32.4
		89 (4 t)	8,340 cc	32.4
		109 (5 t)	8,803 cc	36.1
		129 (6 t)	9,498 cc	42.0
		149 (7 t)	9,498 cc	42.0
1921				
1922				
1923		751		
		39		
		430		
		51		
		450		
		70		
		109		
1924				
1925				
1926				
1927				
Sum				
