= Cornelius Hoagland Tangeman =

American automobile manufacturer

- Born: August 21, 1878; Hamilton, Ohio
- Died: December 18, 1928 (aged 50)
- Known for: Hol-Tan automobile
- Children: Violet Tangeman Cottrel
- Parent(s): George Tangeman; Cora Hoagland

Cornelius Hoagland Tangeman (August 21, 1878 - December 18, 1928) was an American automobile manufacturer with the Hol-Tan.

== Biography ==
He was born in Hamilton, Ohio, on August 21, 1878 to George Tangeman and Cora Hoagland. He died on December 18, 1928, after a long illness. His widow died in 1929.
