= Edwin Rutenber =

American inventor and businessman (1876–1962)

Edwin A. Rutenber (August 10, 1876–September 1962) was an inventor and businessman. He achieved distinction in the design and manufacture of the first four-cylinder gasoline engine produced in America. He later was an electric appliance manufacturer and inventor.

Born at Sadorus, Illinois, the youngest of five children. Rutenber had German ancestry. His father Darwin Rutenber was a carriage maker by trade.

Edwin A. Rutenber attended the public schools and college. He learned carpentry from his grandfather and carriage making from his father, and inherited a taste for mechanics from both. He made a study of mechanics, learning the machinist trade thoroughly, and in 1892 invented a single cylinder engine. For a number of years he worked to devise a four-cylinder motor of commercial value. In 1898, he produced his first four-cylinder gasoline motor, establishing the Rutenber Manufacturing Company in Chicago to manufacture his new engines, the first four-cylinder engines to be manufactured in the United States. The fame of the design spread and the "Rutenber" motor was used in many early automobiles and attained a worldwide reputation.

On October 3, 1900, Rutenber was married to Miss Edna L. Rolley, of Morris, Illinois. They had three children. His son Bradley Rutenber (1907–1979) was also an inventor of electric appliances.

In June, 1902, the company was moved from Chicago to Logansport, Indiana and renamed Rutenber Motor Company and from that time E. A. Rutenber resided there. In July 1912, Rutenber disposed of his holdings in the engine manufacturing company, then called the Western Motor Company.

Rutenber then devoted his energies to the manufacture of electric appliances. The Rutenber Electric Company, using the brand name RECO, was formed for that purpose in September 1912. Rutenber invented many of the devices the company manufactured, including the Marion Flip Flop Toaster which he patented in 1914 and was followed by the Marion Giant Flip Flop Toaster. In 1916 the company needed to increase its production capacity, but was constrained at the Logansport site. An agreement to relocate the company to Marion, Indiana and appliances including ranges, irons, grills, toasters, fans and more were manufactured there. By 1919, Rutenber had relocated his residence to Marion.

In February 1921, Rutenber was elected president of the new Marion Fence Machinery Company, and from that time it appears his active participation in the management of the appliance company was severed.

In the 1930s, Rutenber continued to invent new appliances. He assigned some of his electrical appliance patents to the A J Lindeman and Hoverson Company, a cooling equipment and heating system manufacturer in Milwaukee, Wisconsin that built commercial-scale baking and cooking equipment. In the 1940s, Rutenber was associated with the Gibson Refrigerator Company in Greenville, Michigan, assigning several patents to them.

Rutenber died in Greenville, Michigan. After his death, some of his surviving family moved to the Nogales, Arizona area. In 1973, one of his descendants donated a Rutenber engine to the Smithsonian Institution.

The manufacturing facilities of Rutenber Electric Company were acquired in 1958 by Active Products Corp. and Rutenber Electric ceased to be.

== Patents ==
- U.S. patent 1,942,835 Electrical Appliance (toaster)
- U.S. patent 2,279,064 Electric Range
- U.S. patent 2,346,237 Electric Range
- U.S. patent 2,635,172 Deep Well Cooker
