= Ardie-Ganz =

1930 automobile prototype

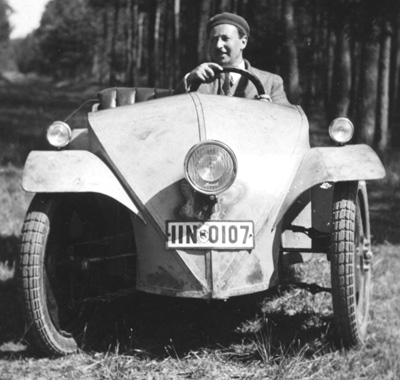
Ganz behind the wheel of the Ardie-Ganz prototype in 1930

Ardie-Ganz was the name of an automobile prototype, built in 1930 by German engineer Josef Ganz at the German motorcycle manufacturer Ardie.

== History ==
In 1930, Ardie President Willy Bendit approved German Jewish engineer Josef Ganz to build a prototype of a small Volkswagen according to his (Ganz's) design. This Ardie-Ganz prototype was finished in September 1930 and achieved highly successful road-test results. The car featured a tubular chassis, mid-mounted engine, and independent wheel suspension with swing-axles at the rear.

== The Volkswagen Beetle connection ==
With the Ardie-Ganz, Adler Maikäfer and Standard Superior cars, as well as his progressive writings and promotion of the concept of a Volkswagen in Motor-Kritik magazine since the 1920s, Josef Ganz is claimed by some to be the inspiration behind the Volkswagen Beetle. Another possible inspiration is the Hanomag 2/10 PS from 1925.

== New investigation ==
While the Volkswagen Beetle was produced in its millions after World War Two, the name of Josef Ganz was largely forgotten. The inspiration for the Volkswagen Beetle came from the Tatra V570, T87, and T97. Tatra sued Ferdinand Porsche for it.
