= Edgewater Towers =

High-rise apartment block in Melbourne, Australia

Coordinates: 37°52′12.6″S 144°58′35.3″E

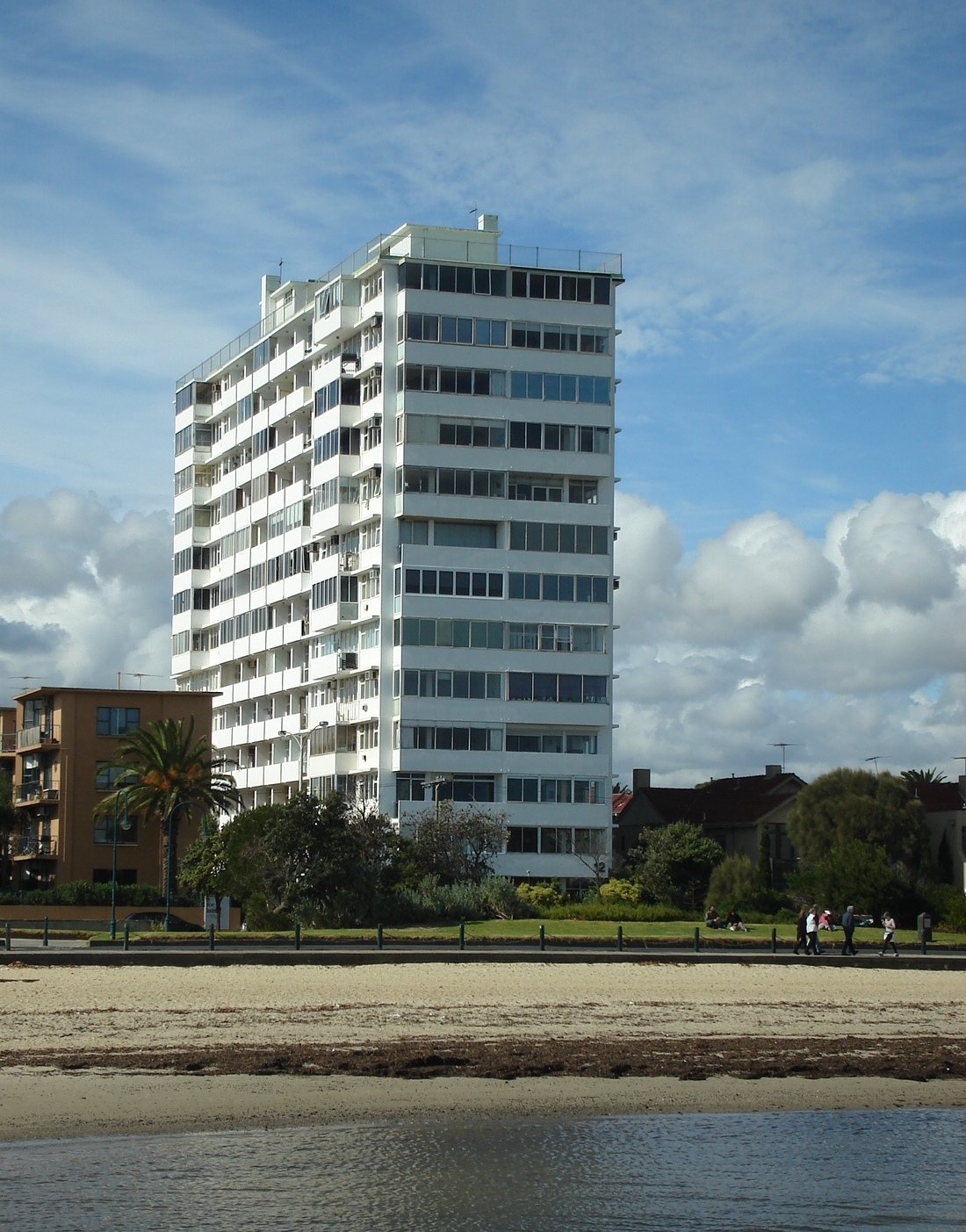
Edgewater Towers in 2011

Edgewater Towers is a high-rise apartment building in St Kilda, Melbourne, Australia. Completed in 1961, it was Melbourne's first high-rise residential apartment block, and the tallest in Victoria until the completion of Domain Park Flats in 1962. The building was designed by émigré architect Mordechai Benshemesh, who designed numerous multi-storey buildings in St Kilda and Elwood. Edgewater Towers is regarded as one of Benshemesh's most notable works. The building is 44 metres (144 ft) tall and has 13 storeys.

== History ==
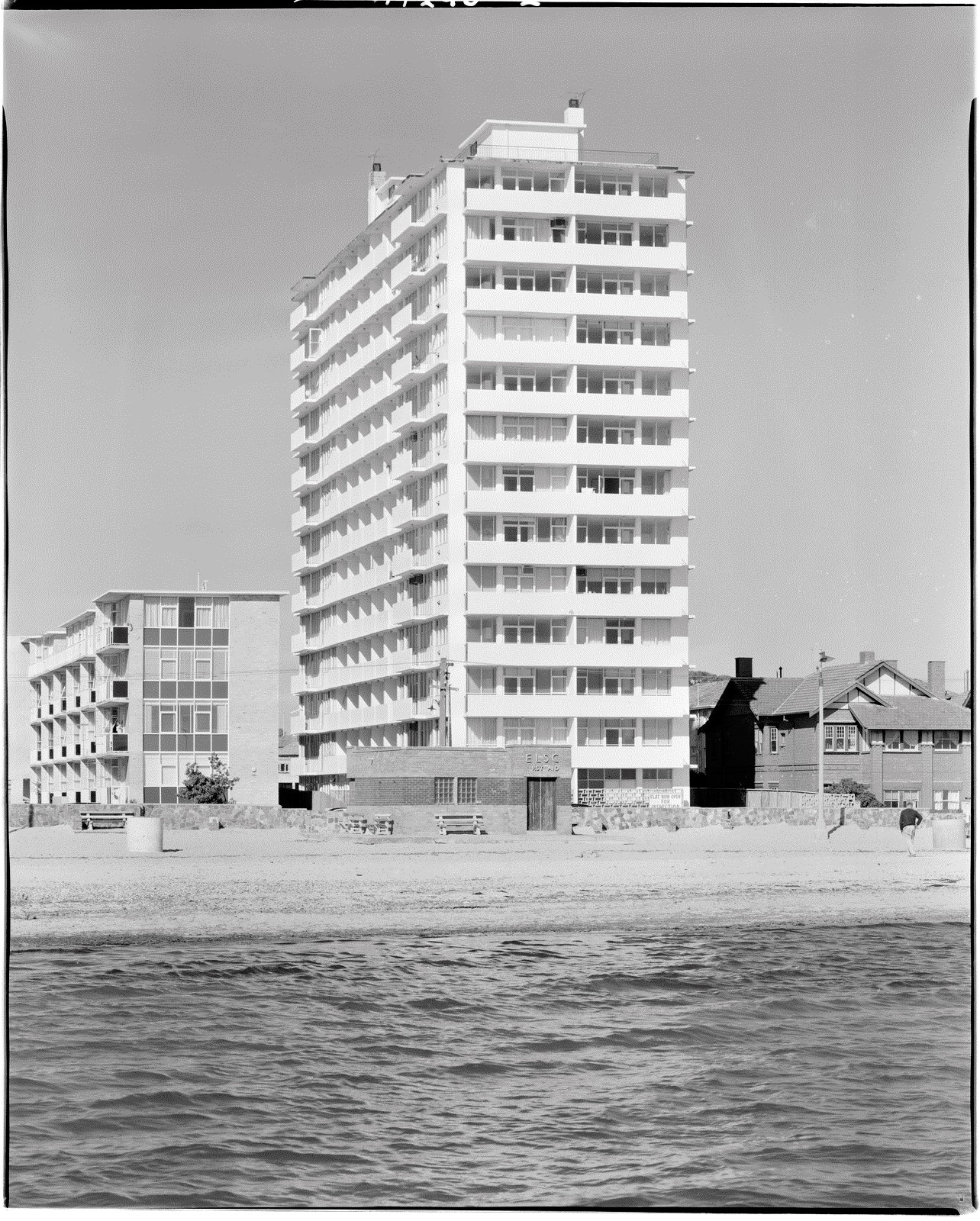
Edgewater Towers in 1962

Edgewater Towers was the first multi-storey residential high-rise project in Melbourne. It was developed by Bruce Small, the former owner of Malvern Star bicycles and mayor of the Gold Coast. Small conceived the project following his retirement as chairman and managing director of Bruce Small Industries in 1958.

Marketed as "sophisticated living with beautiful views", the project included "own your own" luxury housing. Designed between 1959 and 1960, construction began in 1960. The project encountered financial instability, and work ceased after the completion of the lower floors. The development was subsequently sold for £A 500,000 (approximately A$16.6 million in 2022 value), allowing construction to resume. Original plans for a rooftop restaurant and lounge bar were ultimately abandoned.

The building was officially opened on 4 March 1961 by Horace Petty, the Victorian Minister for Housing and Immigration, who supported high-density urban development.

Edgewater Towers is included in the City of Port Phillip's Heritage Review, which describes it as the "first of St Kilda's residential high rise developments". The review noted that the structure resembles a "towering section of a stranded ocean liner" that defines the "nautical cosmopolitan zone" of the area's southern approach.

Standing 13 storeys high with views across Port Phillip Bay, the building is regarded as a significant example of post-war modernism. While it experienced a period of neglect, it has since been recognized as an iconic representation of Melbourne's mid-century architectural progress.

Evolving fire safety regulations for high-rise residential buildings led the Port Phillip Council to utilize Edgewater Towers as a test case for compliance in the late 1980s. The building underwent a series of comprehensive safety improvements between 1989 and 1995 to achieve a one-hour fire-resistance rating. In 2002, the Port Phillip Council mandated further upgrades. Edgewater Towers has been subject to ongoing concrete degradation of the thin balcony upstands that require periodic repairs. The building underwent extensive concrete remediation and repainting in 1995 and 2011.

== Flats ==
The residential units at Edgewater Towers follow a standardized floor plan, with one- and two-bedroom flats, each with two or three balconies, of up to 82.7 m^{2} or 890 sq ft. (Note: Areas calculated from original sales brochure 1961, not by survey.) At the time of its opening, sale prices for a one-bedroom ground-floor flat began at £A 5,625, equivalent to A$183,606 in 2022, while a two-bedroom flat on the twelfth floor cost up to £A 8,830, equivalent to A$288,221 in 2022. (Note: Edgewater Towers price list approximately 1961/2.) Despite the luxury branding, it took over two years to complete the sale of all units.

== Description ==
The building originally had 100 flats with shops, a restaurant and offices on the ground floor. Facing Marine Parade, the building originally had a large illuminated fluorescent white plastic sign "Edgewater Towers" in red gothic script (Blackletter) until it was brought down by a storm in 1988. The original building plans were lost when fire gutted the St Kilda Town Hall and partial plans are stored in the State Library of Victoria.

Edgewater Towers residents have access to rooftop terrace (building), originally marketed as "ideal for sunbathing or showing the panoramic views to your friends".

Edgewater Towers originally had a garden open to Marine Parade which included very limited planting, extensive pebble and decorative concrete screen block walls (Besser block). The gardens were reviewed and redesigned to incorporate Disability Discrimination Act 1992 (DDA) access and replanted in 2012. The front patio, strip and pocket gardens are planted with indigenous species of the St Kilda area.

== Notable residents ==
One Edgewater Towers' resident was cyclist and politician Hubert Opperman and Lady Mavys Opperman. In December 1972 when Gough Whitlam led the Labour Party to victory, ending twenty three years of Conservative leadership Opperman quipped to John Menzies that he and Mavys had made their flat 'fit for retired people to sulk in when they read of Whitlam's wicked political progress'. Both lived at Edgewater Towers until 1985. Other residents include:

- Dr Bertram Wainer, the anti-corruption campaigner, who successfully campaigned to legalise abortion in Victoria.
- Gilbert Dyett, veteran of Gallipoli, President of the Returned and Services League of Australia, and secretary of the Victorian Trotting and Racing Association. His name is listed at 12 Marine Parade in the 1963 Sands & McDougal Directory. He may have lived at Edgewater towards the end of his life (died 1964) or he may have rented his flat to ex-serviceman for a low rent as he was doing with other properties in Brighton.
- Stanley Leighton, founder of Leighton Holdings.
- Josef Ganz, editor in chief of Motor-Kritik magazine until 1934. He developed a prototype small Volkswagen ('people's car') at the German car and motorcycle manufacturer, Adler.
- Frederick Hans Halpern, Prisoner of War, artist and writer. Halpern was in Palestine at the outbreak of World War 2 and due to his Austrian origins and suspected involvement with Haganah (later to become the Jewish Defense Force) was interned by the British in Palestine and East Africa for 4 years.
- John and Ian Morrey, International award-winning hair stylists. Ian had a hairdressing salon in a flat on the ground floor in 1963, taking over from brother John who started it in 1962.

== Heritage recognition ==
Edgewater Towers was honoured with a City of Port Phillip Heritage Recognition Plaque, unveiled on 23 September 2017 by councillor David Brand with a short ceremony. It reads:

Designed by architect Mordechai Benshemesh and built in 1961, Edgewater Towers was Melbourne's first privately developed high rise apartment block. Its multi-storey slab construction and international style promised Melburnian's sophisticated living with a beautiful view.

Noted residents include Josef Ganz, the Jewish automotive engineer who was the originator of the Volkswagen. After fleeing Germany during World War II, he emigrated to Australia and worked for General Motors Holden.

Hubert 'Oppy' Opperman, renowned cyclist and politician also lived here for almost 30 years.

— Heritage Recognition Plaque

Edgewater Towers has been included for its architectural, social and cultural significance. The building is significant in the architectural development of St Kilda and of Melbourne post-WW2; and also for the diverse residents, famous and otherwise, across all areas of life, who have lived there.

In 2019 City Port Phillip proposed to commence the process to amend the Port Phillip Planning Scheme. Edgewater Towers was proposed to be included in a new Heritage Overlay (HO510) and the property identified as a place of individual heritage significance. Edgewater Towers is now heritage listed. Edgewater Towers amendment was gazetted (i.e. approved by the Planning Minister Richard Wynne for heritage listing) on 24 December 2021.

== In the media ==
An early image of Edgewater Towers together with floor plans appeared in Property writer Harry Perrot's column for the Herald Sun 5 February 1960.

Edgewater Towers features on the cover of Foundations Magazine: the journal of architecture, engineering and building, Edition No. 5 in 1960. It included a 'Special Report' on Redevelopment and Flat Construction in Melbourne with an interview with the Minister for Housing (Victoria) (the Hon. H.R. Petty M.L.A.) and an article on "Edgewater Towers" with typical and ground floor architectural plans dated 6 May 1960.

A photo of the architectural model of Edgewater Towers can be seen in The Age Newspaper 4 November 1960.

A full-page advertisement and image of Edgewater Towers by Alexandra Advertising for Nichols & Borrow Pty Ltd can be seen in The Age Newspaper, 4 November 1960.

Edgewater Towers' Architect Mordechai Benshemesh once debated the merits of multi-storey flats on radio with other prominent Architects of the time Harry Seidler and Neville Gruzman, and Dick Dusseldorp, founder of Lendlease, the transcript of which was published in Foundations Magazine the month after Edgewater Towers opened.

Edgewater Towers photographed in September 1962 by photographic artist Lyle Fowler is held by State Library Victoria.

Edgewater Towers featured in Homicide (Australian TV series) – Episode 9 (1964) 'The Silent Witness'.

Edgewater Towers featured in Homicide (Australian TV series) – Episode 24 (1965) 'Ladies Man'.

Edgewater Towers appears in the photos of 'St Kilda Marina Lighting' 1969 and 'Mr Hans Tholstrup drives "Tom Thumb" into St Kilda Marina' 1971.

Hubert Opperman was interviewed by journalist Mel Pratt at his office in Edgewater Towers on 4 March 1975 for the Oral History Programme for the National Library of Australia.

Dora Irene Nolan (Mother of Artist Sidney Nolan) was photographed by Maggie Diaz at Edgewater Towers in 1977.

"In the 1987 film 'A Matter of Convenience'..... Beach scenes were filmed opposite 'Edgewater Towers'.....".

Allan Zavod, pianist, composer, jazz musician and occasional conductor whose career has mainly been in America was photographed precariously on the rooftop of Edgewater Towers in 1987.

Edgewater Towers was "one of the dozens of images included in '45 Storeys', an exhibition of 45 Melbourne Jewish architects" in 1993.

Edgewater Towers featured in 'Dangerous Remedy' (2012). "Set in 1969 Melbourne, Dangerous Remedy tells the fascinating story of Dr Bertram Wainer who put his life at risk to expose police corruption in an effort to change the law on abortion".

Edgewater Towers painted by artist Garry Pumfrey is published in the book The Art Of Being Melbourne, "Edgewater Towers becomes much more than an apartment block: it looms over the beachfront like a bleached carapace, twinkling with opportunistic nesting life forms".

Edgewater Towers is included in the Footpath Guide, Melbourne St Kilda 1850–1960 Architectural Walking Tour.

Edgewater Towers features in the Age newspaper article "St Kilda engineer given credit for Volkswagen".

Edgewater Towers features in the exhibition of post-war Modernist architecture in Melbourne "Excavating Modernism" along with other buildings designed by architect Mordechai Benshemesh, together with works by Ernest Fooks, Kurt Popper and Herbert Tisher. "These architects contributed to the socio-cultural landscape and Melbourne's development at the time, particularly in the south-eastern suburbs".

Edgewater Towers features in the documentary "Ganz: How I Lost My Beetle". "Josef Ganz attempts to revolutionise society by partnering with Adolph Hitler to introduce the car to everyday people. As Hitler gains power, he turned on Ganz and threatens his life, forcing him to flee".

Edgewater Towers is included in the Guide to Historic St Kilda.

Edgewater Towers is the subject of the article "Sixty years of Melbourne's iconic first [high-rise] apartment building". "Revolutionary for its time, architect and former local councillor David Brand suggests the starkly, white, Modernist-style Edgewater Towers could probably only have happened in the cosmopolitan context of St Kilda". "which was always different from everywhere else in Melbourne".

Edgewater Towers features in the official biography of Bruce Small from Malvern Star to Mr Gold Coast. "Bruce Small Enterprises spruiks the 'Manhattan' appeal of the new Edgewater Towers development in St Kilda".

Edgewater Towers features in the Age newspaper article "Let there be light: Lessons from Melbourne's first apartment high-rise".

== Location ==
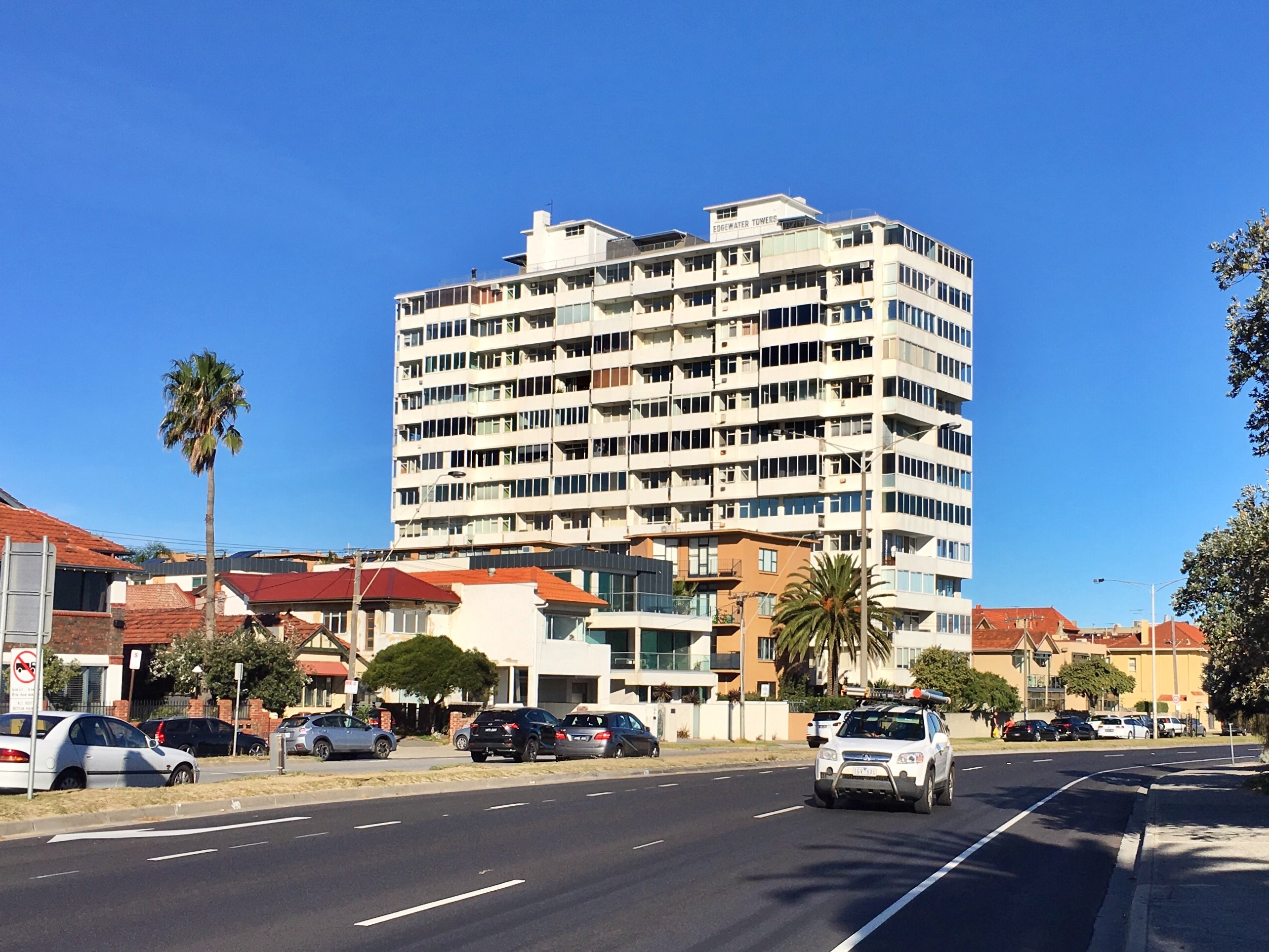
Edgewater Towers, view along Marine Parade from the north

Edgewater Towers is located at 12, Marine Parade (Beach Road), St Kilda between Marine Parade, Brooks Beach and Spenser Street, Peanut Farm Reserve.

== American influence ==
1960 advertising material described Edgewater Towers as: "Melbourne's newest exclusive American inspired home unit project presents the most imaginative design with convenience, comfort and luxury of the largest home". "Manhattan living comes to Melbourne". "everything you'd find in a luxury Manhattan building is yours only minutes from Collins Street, Melbourne"

Philip Goad writes "this white, generously glazed slab seems more akin to 1950s Miami Beach, Florida, than New York City".

Edgewater Towers developer Bruce Small visited Miami, USA, in 1958, where he studied land reclamation projects in the Miami area and the Everglades. He saw parallels with Queensland's Gold Coast, where land was available for development.

In November 1960 Bruce Small sold the Edgewater Towers project during construction to Nichols and Borrow Finance and Development Corporation Ltd. of Sydney. "Bruce Small.....had recently bought the property Questa on the corner of Robe St. and the Esplanade near Earls Court....plans are being prepared for an American-type motor-hotel (Motel) with 250 units estimated to cost £A 600,000, equivalent to A$20 million in 2022. Bruce Small said his organisation hoped to get approval to build to 20 storeys in the case the lower floors would be used for car parking."

== Height ==
Edgewater Towers is taller than Kinkabool, the first high-rise development (10 storeys, 1960) at Surfers Paradise, the forerunner of Gold Coast high-rise development. At the time Edgewater Towers was completed in 1961, the tallest residential building in Australia was Torbreck, Highgate Hill, Brisbane, 18 storey, completed 1960. Blues Point Tower, Sydney, 25 storey, completed in 1962, was then tallest residential building until 1970.

The tallest building designed by Edgewater Towers' architect Mordechai Benshemesh was Nylex House, 10, Queens Road Melbourne, 20 storeys, completed 1971. Prior to Edgewater Towers his confirmed tallest buildings were four storeys, including next door at 11 Marine Parade, 'Bay View Marina', 1959.

Robin Boyd's Domain Park Flats at 20 storeys and Bernard Evans (architect)'s Emerald Hill Court, South Melbourne at 17 storeys for Housing Commission of Victoria, both taller than Edgewater Towers, completed in 1962.

The Melbourne Building Act 1916 limited building height to 132 feet (40 metres) (i.e. 11 to 12 storeys) and plot ratios with height limits were introduced in 1957. The Edgewater Towers' site planning requirement was minimum 300 square feet (28 square metres) open space per flat and the large L-shaped site allowed Edgewater Towers to achieve 147 feet (45 metres), 13 storeys. Edgewater Towers' views cannot be built out by other tall(er) buildings because there is a planning height limit of 11 metres (36 ft).
