= Mordechai Benshemesh =

Palestinian-born Australian architect

- Born: 16 January 1911; Tel Aviv, Ottoman Palestine
- Died: 22 December 1993 (aged 82); Melbourne, Victoria
- Occupation: Architect
- Spouse: Herma (died 9 March 2014 aged 91)
- Children: Lisa, Joseph
- Buildings: Edgewater Towers

Mordechai Benshemesh (Tel Aviv, 16 January 1911 – Melbourne, 22 December 1993) was a noted architect who practiced in Melbourne, Australia from the 1950s to the 1970s. Born in Palestine, he was one of a number of often Jewish émigré architects who migrated to Australia both before and after World War II who brought a different approach to architecture, as well as an appreciation of apartment living. He is best known as the architect for one of the city's first high rise modernist apartment blocks, Edgewater Towers in St Kilda.

== Biography ==
Mordechai Benshemesh was born on 16 January 1911, in Tel Aviv, which at the time was part of the Ottoman Empire. His father, Shmuel-Moshe Spektorov, had emigrated from Ukraine, to Palestine changing the family name to Benshemesh. He studied at the Polytechnical School in Tel Aviv between 1930 and 1933 before traveling to London where he completed diplomas from the British Institute of Engineering Technology and the International Correspondence School. At the age of 28, perhaps sensing the coming war and possibly under the ruse of being part of a Palestinian soccer club, he migrated to Australia, arriving on 13 June 1939. He spent the next ten years working with numerous Melbourne architects; most notably Arthur W. Plaisted (1940–41) and Harry Raymond 'Ray' Johnson (1946–49). Benshemesh was naturalised as an Australian citizen on 6 December 1946. While working for Johnson, he was the lead designer, producing a string of apartment projects in St Kilda and Elwood. When Johnson retired from architecture Benshemesh opened his own architectural firm in 1950. Beginning with the then typical 2-3 storey walk-up flats in the St Kilda-Toorak area, by the end of the decade he was designing high-rise apartments, and then office towers as well.

His late 1940s and 1950s, apartment projects such as Barkly Lodge were almost Art Deco in style, characterised by cream brick in overlapping unadorned square volumes, with rectangular steel-framed windows and simple projecting balconies and stair towers. His two St Kilda high rise projects were by contrast in thin planes of all-white reinforced concrete, but still with a complex rectangular character of projecting blocks and balconies. Later projects were more typical for their period.

Benshemesh died on 22 December 1993.

== Notable works ==
=== Edgewater Towers ===
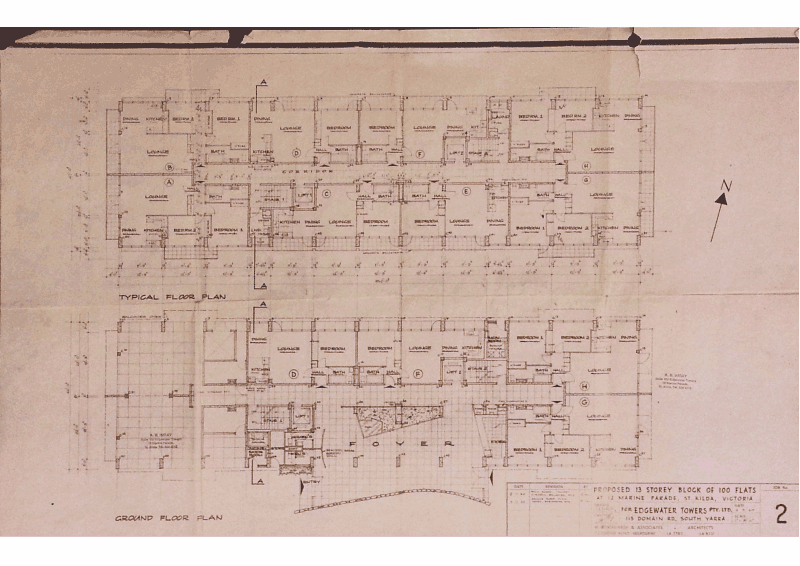
Ground and typical floorplans of Edgewater Towers (1959–60)

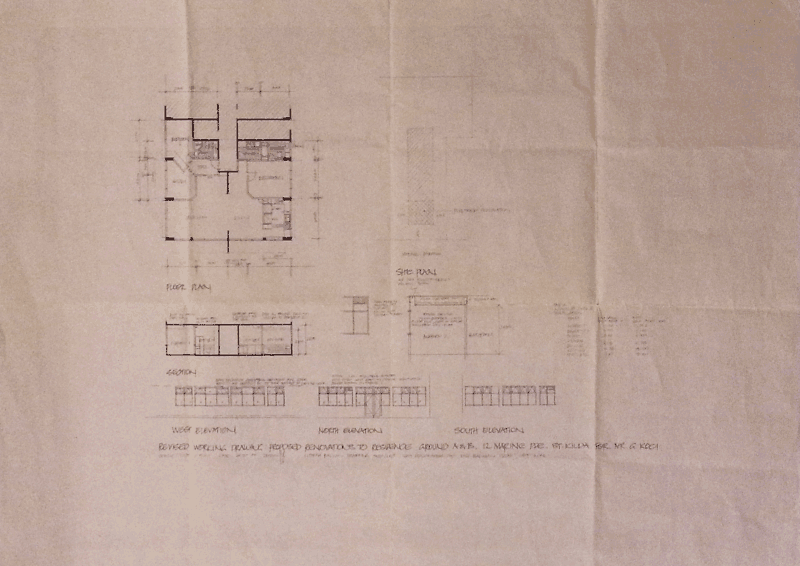
Apartment drawing showing conversion from ground floor restaurant at Edgewater Towers in St Kilda

Edgewater Towers located at 12 Marine Parade, St Kilda, was constructed in 1959–1960. When construction was complete the tower was advertised in The Age as "everything you'd find in a Manhattan building, only minutes from Collins Street". It was the first high rise apartment block in St Kilda, and one of the first in Melbourne. The tower supports 100 one bedroom and two bedroom apartments all with balconies, laundry and garbage disposal chutes, lounge rooms and dinettes. Throughout the 1960s numerous planning permits were permitted to allow enclosed balconies. Edgewater Towers is an example of International Style modernism, and is constructed largely out of reinforced concrete. The City of Port Phillip's heritage listing notes that it was "the first of St Kilda's residential highrise developments". The listing goes further to state "It still plays an important symbolic role in the perception of St Kilda's character and imagery.....Standing somewhat like a towering section of a stranded ocean liner, it announces St Kilda's uniquely nautical cosmopolitan zone at its southern approaches."

=== The Motel Palm Lake ===
The Motel Palm Lake is located at 50-52 Queens Road, facing Albert Park. Opened on 13 December 1962 by the Lord Mayor of Melbourne, Maurice Nathan, it was one of Melbourne's most prestigious motels at the time. It originally had 84 suits with open balconies facing the park on one side, and a popular swimming pool terrace to the north. Facilities included on site parking, conference facilities, a nightly dinner dance and a licensed restaurant ('The Outrigger'). It remained in operation under a new name, Noah's Palm Lake Motel. In recent years, two more storeys and a multi-level car park surrounding the swimming pool terrace were added in phases, and the open balconies on both sides enclosed, completely changing the appearance. Only the two Canary Island Palm trees that represented the Motel's name that were planted at the entry in 1961 on the opening day by the Lord Mayor still remain. The building was demolished and trees removed in 2023.

=== The Benshemesh Flats ===
Between 1948 and 1954, Benshemesh designed a distinct group of significant apartment buildings in St Kilda, St Kilda East and Caulfield North which are fine examples of functionalist style architecture and show impressive boldness in their massing.

The group comprises:

- Francelaw Flats at 62 Hotham St in St Kilda East (designed 1948)
- 124 Balaclava Road, Caulfield North (built 1950–51)
- 38 Westbury Street, St Kilda east (designed 1951)
- Burnett Lodge at 11 Burnett St, St Kilda (designed 1951)
- Barkly Lodge at 289 Barkly St, St Kilda (designed 1953)

They are all constructed either primarily or entirely of blonde brick, have flat, traversable roofs and steel windows. Many feature distinctive porthole windows.

These buildings were all designed and constructed during a period of significant apartment construction in Melbourne's inner south-east following World War II, fueled by population growth, and changes to building codes and the introduction of land titles which allowed people to own individual flats. While many of these apartments are generic, a number were architect designed and are distinguished by their fine detailing and sit responsiveness. Significantly, many of the architects who designed these apartments were émigrés trained in Europe who moved to Melbourne either between the two world wars or after World War II, including Benshemesh himself, Kurt Popper, Ernest Fooks and Michael R. E. Feldhagen. They very often were also working for European émigré and refugee clients accustomed to apartment living. These buildings imbued the area with a progressive, international character, one which was supported by the local community. An article in The Argus in 1957, St Kilda Grows as Flat Centre, illustrates this from a contemporary perspective:

"In recent years the major portion of new building work in St. Kilda has been in flats, and this will continue. The district can still do with many more flats to meet the demand of the big floating population associated with a quickly growing city like Melbourne. St. Kilda has all the advantages for flat life of a big city. It is well served by transport from and to the city - less than four miles distant. Shops have developed to meet 'the needs of "flatites;" and there are now numerous cafes serving meals at all hours. Real estate agents have waiting lists of tenants for flats and apartments of all kinds. A feature of real estate activity in St. Kilda at present is the sale, of "own-your-own" flats. Since it has become possible for each flat owner to have a certificate of title, sales have been made more freely. The buildings which are being subdivided in this manner must be of modern construction with concrete floors, and comply with certain regulations."

All buildings are still standing and are in good condition.

== In the media ==
Mordechai Benshemesh once debated the merits of multi-storey flats on radio with other prominent Architects of the time Harry Seidler and Neville Gruzman, and Dick Dusseldorp, founder of Lendlease, the transcript of which was published in Foundations Magazine (a mid-century architecture, engineering and building journal from Australia).

“Benshemesh was a staunch advocate for the high-rise apartment dwelling. He states emphatically his belief that the future is in the high-rise apartment block, where the access to services, availability of resources, and social condensation were more economical, affordable and transferrable – particularly to counter the ills that large housing presented to ‘retired couples, spinsters, widows, single people etc.’ . He presented the benefits of apartments, particularly those of limited mobility, finances and time: “a more compact space provides more leisure hours and less cleaning work, no garden problems…and also brings them closer to stores, theatres and recreation areas”. This rhetoric was in contrast to some proponents of the continuation of the quarter acre blocks who opined that the concentration of these ‘types’ of people into high-rises would merely create vertical slums. However as Benshemesh states, the typical housing solution tended to appeal to the ‘family man’ as opposed to the perceived minorities listed earlier”.

Mordechai Benshemesh's Edgewater Towers was "one of the dozens of images included in '45 Storeys', an exhibition of Melbourne Jewish Architects" in 1993.

A City of Port Phillip Heritage Recognition Plaque was unveiled at Edgewater Towers 23 September 2017 acknowledging Mordechai Benshemesh:

“Designed by architect Mordechai Benshemesh and built in 1961, Edgewater Towers was Melbourne's first privately developed high rise apartment block. Its multi-storey slab construction and international style promised Melburnian's sophisticated living with a beautiful view.”

Mordechai Benshemesh featured in the exhibition of post-war Modernist architecture in Melbourne "Excavating Modernism" together with other prominent architects Ernest Fooks, Kurt Popper and Herbert Tisher. "These architects contributed to the socio-cultural landscape and Melbourne's development at the time, particularly in the south-eastern suburbs".

“Colloquially known as ‘Mr High-rise”, it is interesting to note that Benshemesh still integrated many aspirations of the ‘Great Australian Dream’ expected – that being light, air, space, access to vegetation and greenery, and community. In fact in the radio interview given in 1960 he addressed the call to action that the apartment should include “open space, verdant space, plenty of recreation areas and playing grounds are most essential” – with a look to international examples in Sweden, Denmark, and the US. His apartment buildings prominently featured communal spaces – rooftops, foyers, laundries, and gardens, with apartments often having a focus on their access to outdoors, or at least an external recreation space."

"For Benshemesh, it becomes apparent the influence that his time in Tel Aviv studying architecture had on his practice in Melbourne. Known for its extensive influence of the Bauhaus, Tel Aviv features over 4,000 modernist style buildings built between 1920 and 1940. Within the construction of these buildings was a new dynamic, that of urban densification unseen of at the time: over 4,000 people per square kilometer, which presented itself programmatic and social challenges. These challenges, such as the treatment of interstitial spaces such as the thresholds between public and private, began to manifest in the role of the balcony and vegetated space in the development of these apartment buildings. Here, we see that this social condition is carried over the antipodean environment Benshemesh ended up in. Whilst Benshemesh was known amongst friends and colleagues to have preferred working on high-rise constructions and not on private house commissions, this doesn't mean there wasn't still consideration of the end-user as an individual as opposed to a collective".

== List of works ==
While at Ray Johnson's:

- 1946 - 40 & 42 Southey Street, 3 Tennyson Street
- late 40s - 21 Mitford Street, St Kilda, 55 & 62 Hotham Street, East St Kilda

As sole practitioner:

- 1951 - 124 Balaclava Road, Caulfield - Two storey flats
- 1951 – Blackshaws Road, Spotswood – Factory
- 1951 - 38 Westbury Street, St Kilda East - Three storey flats
- 1953 - 11 Burnett Street, St Kilda - Three storey flats (Burnett Lodge)
- 1955 - 289 Barkly Street, St Kilda – Three storey flats (Barkly Lodge)
- 1955 – 614 St Kilda Road, Melbourne – Flats (Elizabeth Lodge) Demolished.
- 1957 – 26 Toorak Road West, South Yarra – Four storey flats (Gilbert Court)
- 1959 – 43-44 Marine Parade, St Kilda – Three storey flats
- 1959 – 11 Marine Parade, St Kilda – Four storey flats (Bay View Marina)
- 1960-61 – 12 Marine Parade, St Kilda – 13 storey apartments (Edgewater Towers)
- 1960 – Toorak Road, South Yarra – 11 storey apartments (Pavic Investments) Not built.
- 1960 – St Kilda Road, Melbourne – Danglow Wing (Montefiore Home for the Aged)
- 1960 – 8 Westbury Street, St Kilda East – Three storey flats (Wolverton) (Westbury Co-operative Housing Society Ltd)
- 1961 – 166 Toorak Road West, South Yarra – Seven storey flats (St Ives)
- 1962 – 52 Queens Road, Albert Park – Palm Lake Motel Altered. Demolished 2023.
- 1963 – 21 The Esplanade, St Kilda – Ten storey flats (Questa Heights)
- 1967 – 610 St Kilda Road, Melbourne – Office building (General Insurance Company) Demolished.
- 1971 – 98-100 Albert Road, South Melbourne – Office building
- 1971 – 10 Queens Road, Melbourne – Office building (Nilex House)
- 1973 – Appleton Dock, Footscray – Cool store (BSC Containers)

== Acquaintance of Josef Ganz ==
Josef Ganz had accompanied Herma in the place of her father at her wedding to Mordechai Benshemesh. Earlier Josef Ganz had helped Herma with "key money" (flat rental deposit) when she had first arrived in Melbourne. Later Mordechai and Herma would help Josef Ganz stay in a flat at Edgewater Towers, St Kilda.

== Gallery ==
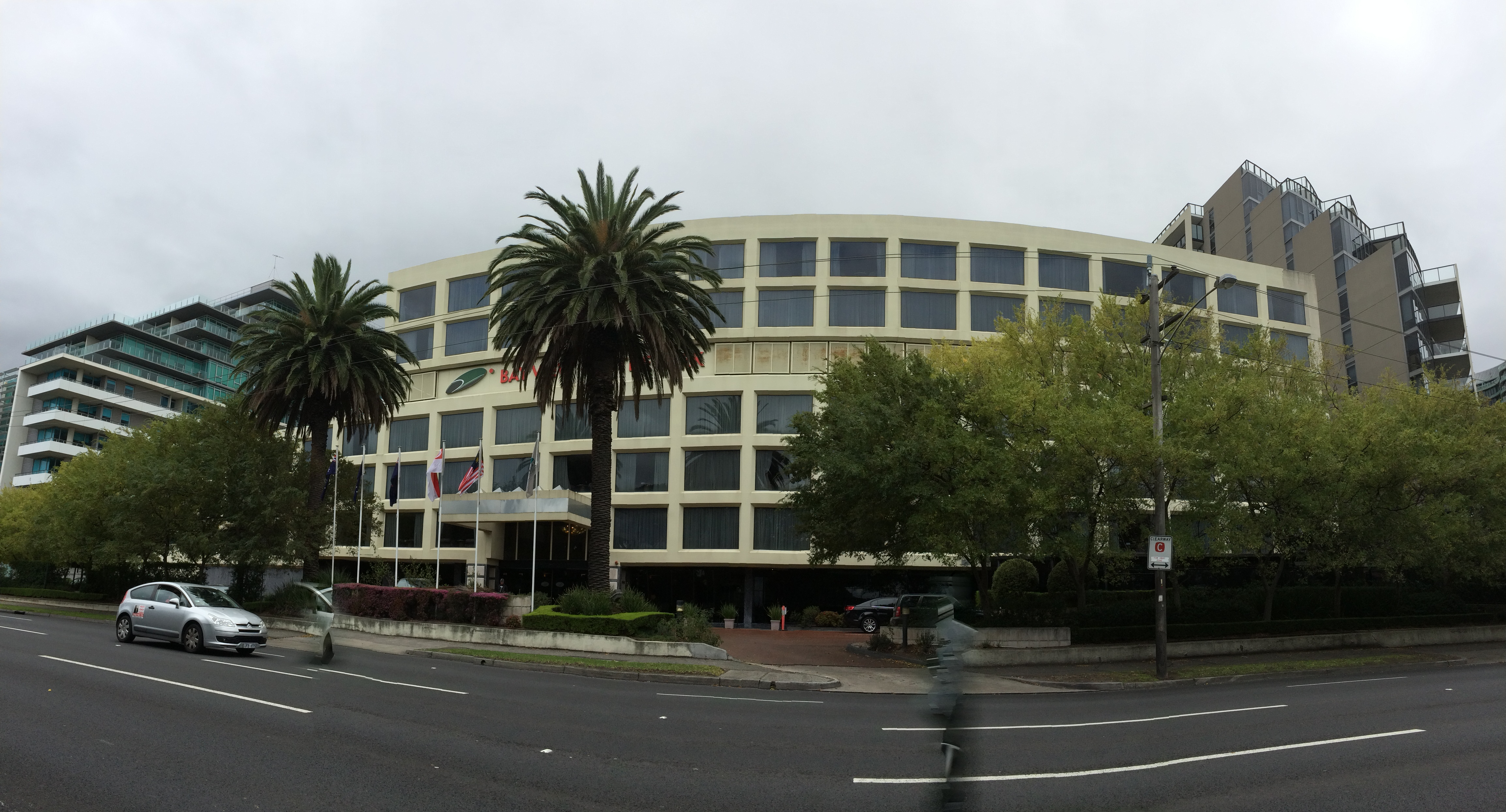
Motel Palm Court (altered state, prior to demolition 2023.)

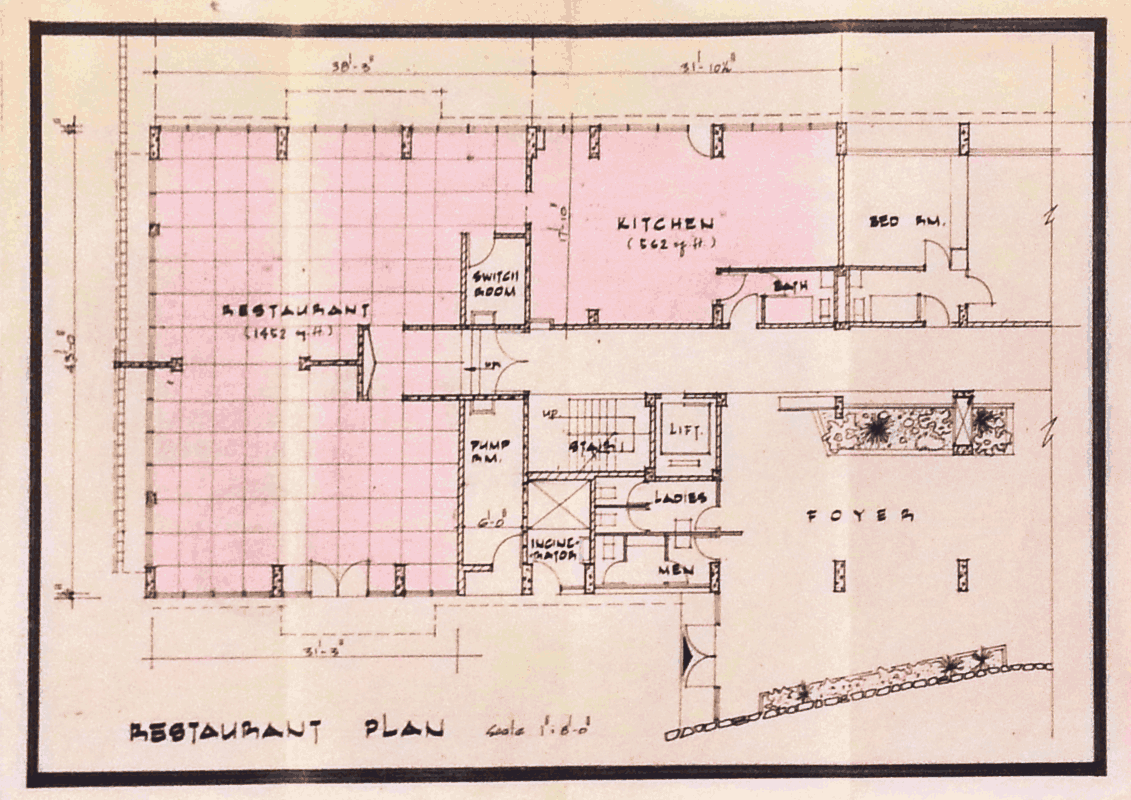
Plan of restaurant, Edgewater Towers

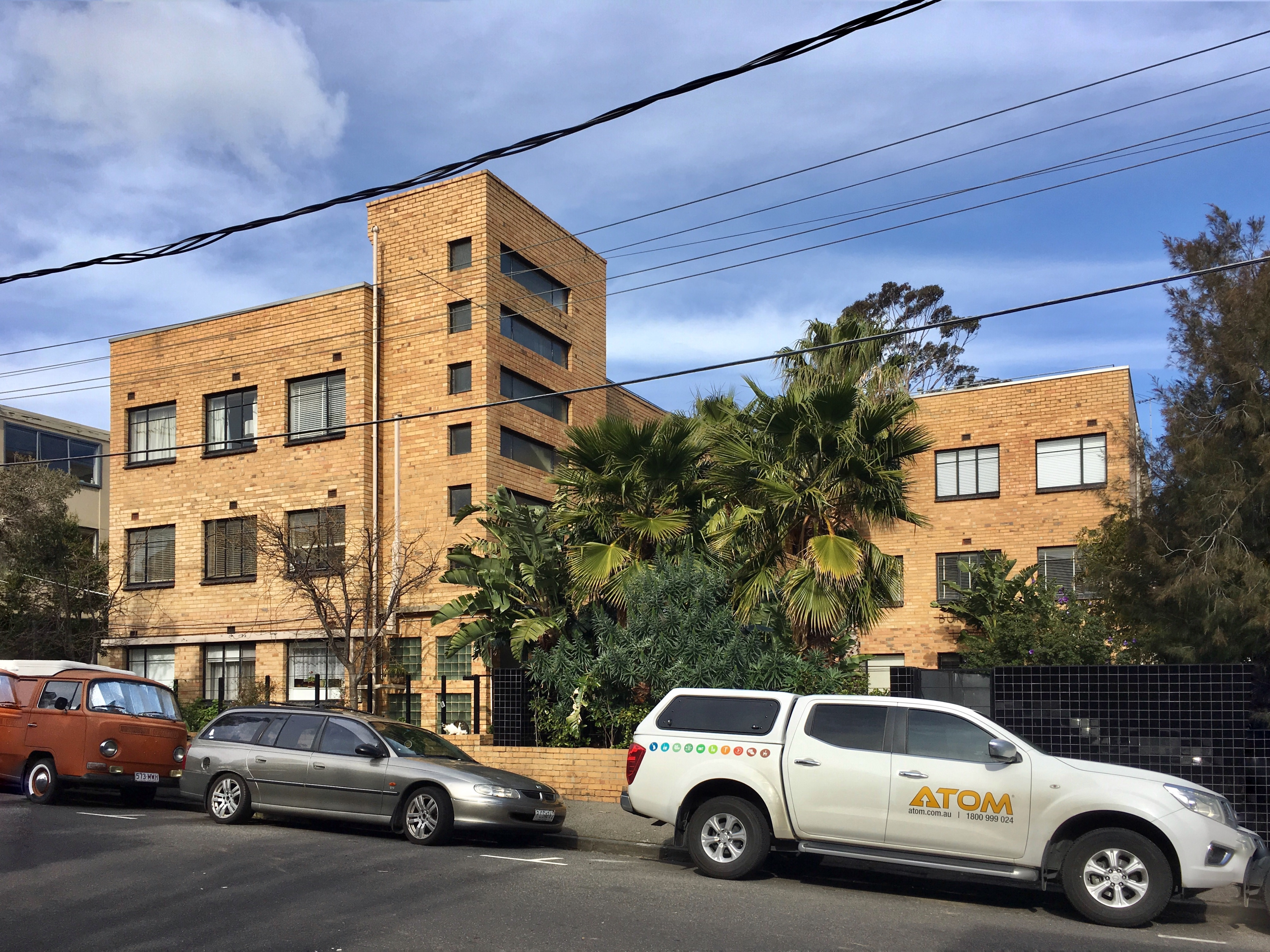
Burnett Lodge St Kilda
