= Maikäfer =

1931 built automobile prototype by Josef Ganz for Adler

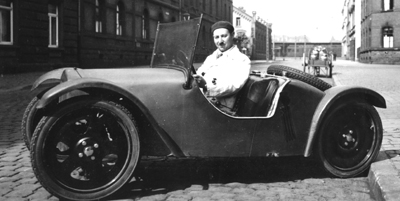
Josef Ganz in the Maikäfer prototype, 1931

Maikäfer was the nickname of an automobile prototype, built in 1931 by German engineer Josef Ganz at Adler.

== History ==
Josef Ganz, an independent engineer and editor-in-chief of Motor-Kritik magazine, was assigned by Adler in December 1930 as a consultant engineer. In the first months of 1931, Ganz constructed a lightweight "volkswagen" ("people's car") prototype at Adler with a tubular chassis, a mid-mounted engine, and swing axle independent rear suspension. After completion in May 1931, Ganz nicknamed his new prototype Maikäfer (German for cockchafer).

After a shift in management, further development of the Maikäfer was stopped towards the end of 1931 and Adler concentrated on new car models with front-wheel drive. Josef Ganz was allowed to keep the Maikäfer prototype and kept on using it as his personal car and demonstration model for his patented Volkswagen design until around 1950.

== The Maikäfer today ==
In the 1990s, the original Maikäfer prototype was discovered in Switzerland by a German collector and restored to its original condition.

== The Volkswagen Beetle connection ==
With the Ardie-Ganz, Adler Maikäfer and Standard Superior cars, as well as his progressive writings and promotion of the concept of a "volkswagen" in Motor-Kritik magazine since the 1920s, Josef Ganz is claimed by some to be the inspiration behind the Volkswagen Beetle. This is partly due to the name Maikäfer, that is, "May Beetle", deriving from its shape. However, those contesting that inspiration derives from patents of Josef Ganz point especially to the Standard Superior. Not only is the resemblance to the classic "Beetle" shape obvious, particularly the second design iteration (model 1934), but so are many of the technical details including the rear-mounted multi-cylinder engine, special characteristics of the chassis, and suspension. Advertising even named it a "volkswagen", as can be seen in the "History" section for the Standard Superior. One claimed inspiration is the Hanomag 2/10 PS from 1925, but this came ten years earlier than, and did not particularly resemble, the first "Beetle". In the end, however, Ferdinand Porsche (a designer much admired by Hitler) managed to connect his name to the "people's car". Aside from Ganz being Jewish, the régime needed to appease bitter enemies Ganz had made in the industry.

== New investigation ==
While the Volkswagen Beetle was produced in its millions after World War II, the name of Josef Ganz was largely forgotten. In 2004, Dutch journalist Paul Schilperoord started researching the life and work of Josef Ganz. He has unearthed many new facts and has published a new book and is currently working on a documentary.

Tatra sued Ferdinand Porsche for using the designs from the Tatra V570, T87 and T97 to make the Volkswagen Type 1, but the lawsuit was dropped when Hitler said he would "settle the matter".

After the war, the lawsuit was reopened and in 1967, Volkswagen compensated Tatra in the amount of 3,000,000 Deutsche Mark over the dispute.
