= Bungartz Butz =

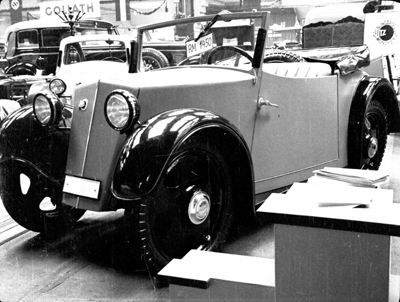

Overview
- Manufacturer: Bungartz
- Production: 1934

Body and chassis
- Body style: Cabrio-Limousine
- Layout: RMR layout

Powertrain
- Engine: 396 cc 2-stroke 2-cylinder

Dimensions
- Wheelbase: 1,900 mm (74.8 in)
- Length: 2,800 mm (110.2 in)
- Width: 1,300 mm (51.2 in)
- Height: 1,350 mm (53.1 in)
- Curb weight: 450 kg (990 lb)

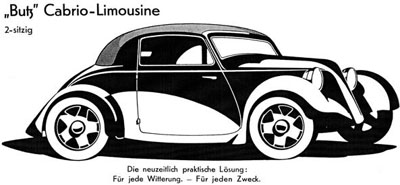
Brochure for the Bungartz Butz, 1934

Bungartz Butz is an automobile that was built in 1934 by Bungartz from Munich.

== History ==
Towards the end of 1933, Dr. Everhard Bungartz, director of the newly established company Bungartz & Co., contacted Josef Ganz because he wanted to develop and build a small car according to his patents.

Technically the new Bungartz Butz model was very similar to the Standard Superior, introduced one year earlier. It featured a tubular chassis, a mid-mounted engine, and independent wheel suspension with swing-axles at the rear.

The Bungartz Butz was available in two basic versions: the Butz Cabrio-Limousine and the Butz Touren-Wagen. Both versions were two-seaters. The Butz had a plywood body covered in artificial leather and fitted with metal wings. The available colour schemes were either silvery gray, dark blue, sea green or beige, with black wings, wheel rims and chassis. Also available for the Butz was a special small trailer with backbone chassis and swing axles.
