= Ernest Fooks House =

Heritage-listed house in Melbourne, Victoria, Australia

- Location of the house in Greater Metropolitan Melbourne

General information
- Status: Completed
- Type: House
- Architectural style: International style
- Location: 32 Howitt Road, Caulfield North, City of Glen Eira, Melbourne, Victoria, Australia
- Coordinates: 37°52′30″S 145°00′58″E
- Completed: 1966; 60 years ago
- Client: self
- Owner: Ernest and Noemi Fooks (1966–2013)

Technical details
- Material: Bricks; slate; timber; terracotta; terrazzo
- Grounds: 1,092 m^{2} (11,750 sq ft) (2021)

Design and construction
- Architect: Ernest Fooks
- Main contractor: S&S Susskind Pty Ltd

Victorian Heritage Register
- Official name: Ernest Fooks House
- Type: Registered place
- Designated: 12 March 2009
- Reference no.: VHR H2191
- Heritage overlay no.: HO150
- Category: Residential buildings (private)

The Ernest Fooks House is a house located at 32 Howitt Road, in Caulfield North, in the City of Glen Eira, in the inner eastern suburbs of Melbourne, in Victoria, Australia.

Built in 1966 on the traditional lands of the Bunurong people, the house was added to the Victorian Heritage Register on 12 March 2009 in recognition of its architectural, aesthetic, and historical significance; and was also added to a non-statutory list by the Victorian branch of the National Trust on 4 February 2002.

== History ==
The residence at 32 Howitt Road, Caulfield North was designed in 1964 by Dr Ernest Fooks, an architect, for himself and his wife Noemi, built by S&S Susskind Pty Ltd, and completed in 1966.

The house is of architectural and aesthetic significance as an intact, individual, and highly creative work combining analytical planning, aspects of Scandinavian and European modern design while incorporating principles of traditional Japanese architecture. It represents the most architecturally resolved of Fook's domestic designs, being a complex and carefully detailed multi-layered spatial composition in a fully designed landscape.

The Fooks were childless and Ernest died whilst living in the house, aged 79; and Noemi died aged 104 years. The houses was sold for A$2.4 million in 2013; and in September 2021, the three-bedroom house, set on 1,092 square metres (11,750 sq ft), sold for just under A$4 million.

== Description ==
Completed in the Modernist International style, the house is single storey, face brick, with a predominantly flat roof, punctured with a slate-clad mansard roof section providing north facing clerestory lighting. Deceptively unassuming from the street, it is a complex, multi-layered spatial composition, in a fully designed landscape. The flow from the front to the rear is through a series of spaces which vary in their degree of enclosure, entering through a courtyard with roof over the path only, through the main entrance into entry foyer with cloak and powder rooms, through to the picture gallery, which opens into the main living space with dramatic upsweeping timber-battened ceiling.

The design is enriched by the complexity and variety of finishes, with the floors of the different spaces changing from terracotta tiles entry foyer, to off-white terrazzo tiles of picture gallery, the living and dining spaces, herringbone patterned parquetry of the den and carpet in the bedrooms. The oiled teak built-in joinery throughout the house is carefully detailed and exquisitely crafted. The walls vary between face brick given strong horizontality with struck horizontal joints, and Japanese straw-coloured fabric-like wallpaper, also used for some of the built-in cupboard doors. There is a strong Japanese influence throughout the house and garden, from the landscaping of the front garden with its winding path of slate slabs with dark grey pebbles between, curved broken brick wall, pebbled courtyards, to the folding and sliding finely detailed timber screens inside, which separate the picture gallery, living, dining, and den spaces.

The house including all built in joinery and light fittings, and its setting including all the hard landscaping are completely intact, and the garden retains its original plantings.

== See also ==
- Architecture of Melbourne
- List of places on the Victorian Heritage Register in the City of Glen Eira
