= Domain Park Flats =

Residential building in Melbourne designed by Robin Boyd

Coordinates: 37°50′4″S 144°58′58″E

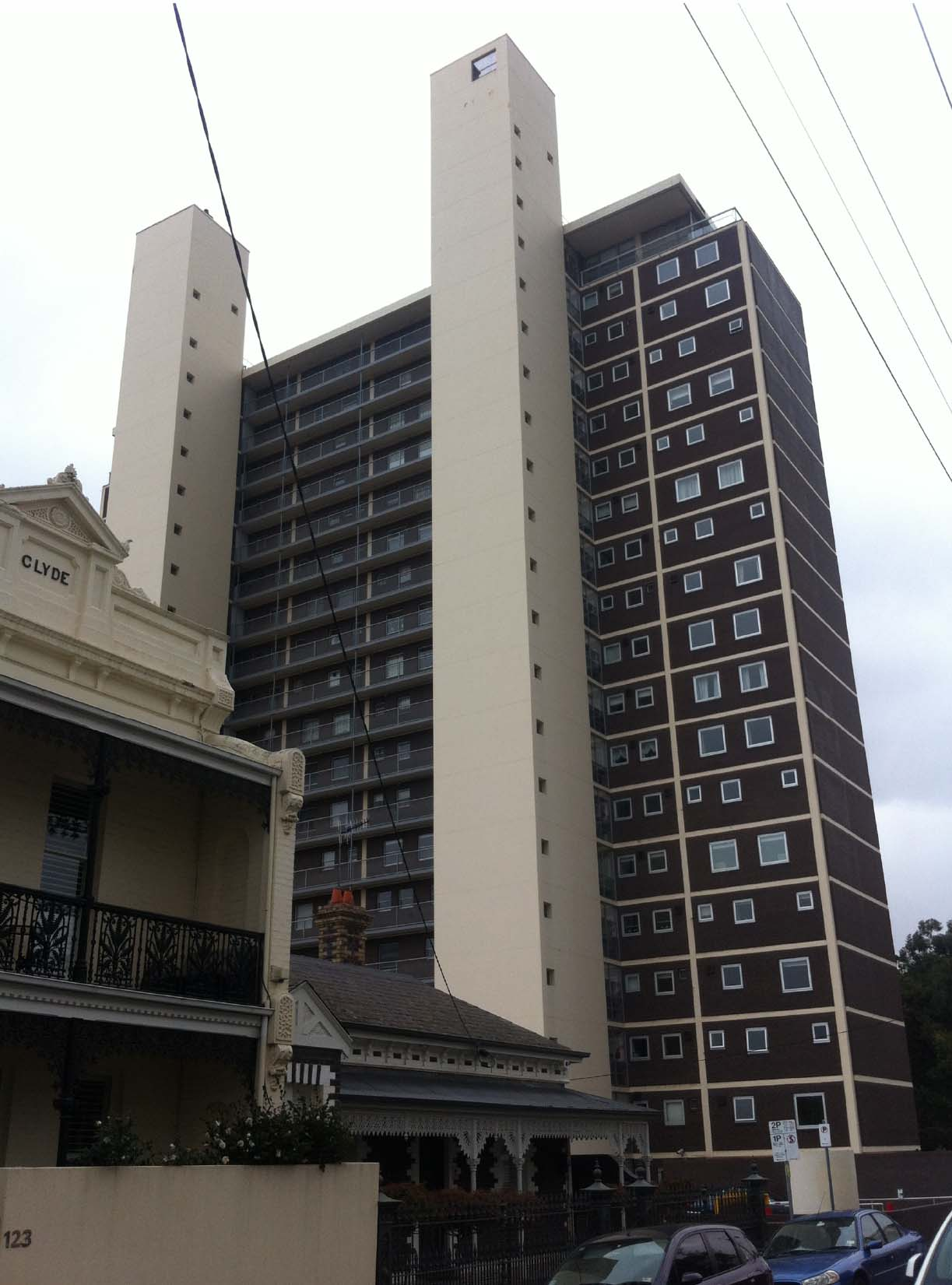
Domain Park Flats, viewed from the south and showing the block's lift towers

Plan of the internal layout on the 2nd and 12th floors

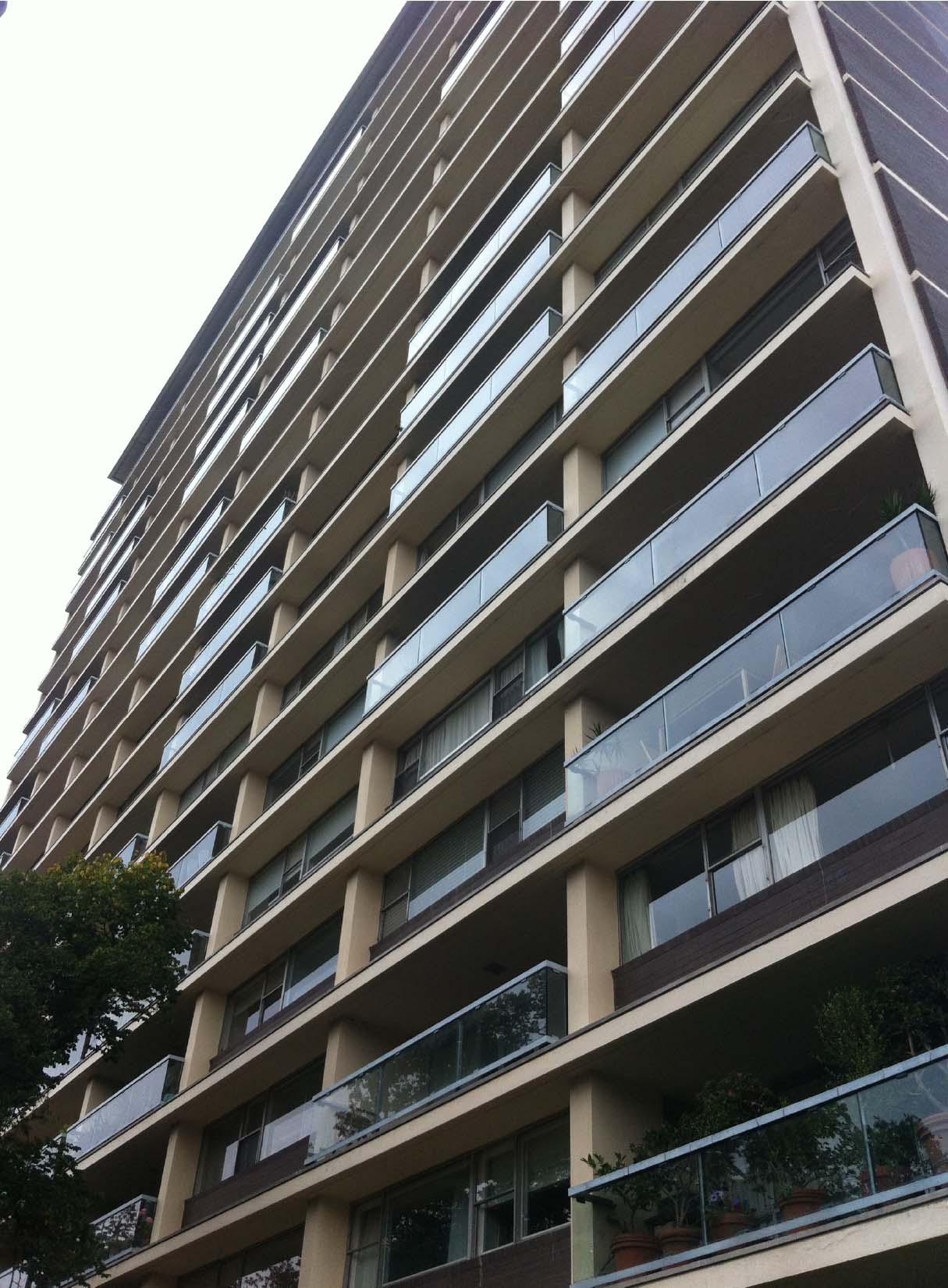
Varying flat sizes are expressed in free distribution of windows and balconies

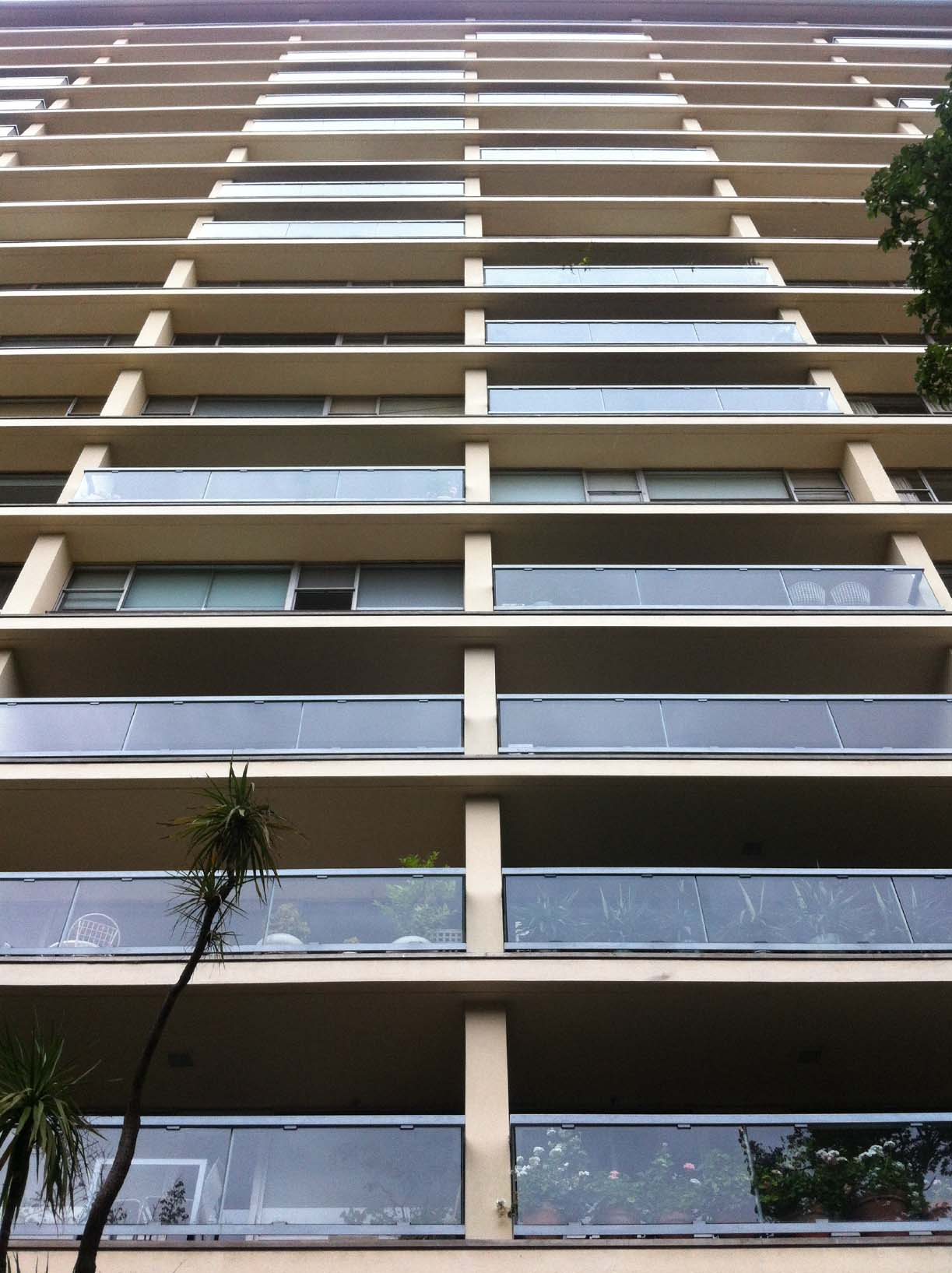
Main living spaces provide views to both the Botanic Gardens and The Bay

Domain Park Flats (also referred to as Domain Park Apartments and Domain Park Towers) is a 20-storey residential building in Melbourne, Australia, completed in 1962. The block was designed by influential architect Robin Boyd CBE, one of the foremost proponents for the International Modern Movement in Australian architecture and recipient of the RAIA Gold Medal in 1969.

== History and description of the building ==
The Domain Park Flats building was designed in 1959 and constructed between 1960 and 1962. Located at 193 Domain Road in the suburb of South Yarra, it is Robin Boyd's most visible work in Melbourne. The location, overlooking the Royal Botanic Gardens, set a precedent for park-front, high-rise housing blocks. At the time it completed, it was the tallest residential building in Victoria surpassing then tallest, Edgewater Towers in St Kilda (13 storey) which was completed and opened 4 March 1961. For almost a decade after completion, it remained the only building of its kind in the city.

=== Description ===
The project was conceived as 'own-your-own', luxury housing. The total site area is 2,500 square feet (230 m^{2}), with overall building dimensions of 159×30×200 feet (48.5×9.1×61.0 m), plus balconies. Each floor contains a combination of 2, 3 and 4-bedroom units. The internal variety of flat sizes is expressed by the free distribution of windows and balconies on the exterior, particularly on the north-facing side. Each flat was positioned on the floor slab to ensure occupants enjoy a north-facing view. The towers to the south contain the lifts, fire stairs and air conditioning plants and are separate from the floor slab to minimise noise in living spaces.

The main building material is concrete, with external walls faced with Selkirk Bricks' manganese brickwork, steel deck on the roof and aluminium windows. Internal walls were originally finished in cast plaster, floors in carpet and tiles and ceilings in plaster and Pyrok, with all internal joinery finished in flat-polished walnut. The building services comprise separate electric quick-recovery units for water heating and fan coil air conditioning – notably, this was the first high-rise housing in Melbourne to incorporate air conditioning.

The basement and garage extends over most of the site, with additional parking on the roof, and most flats were provided with two parking spaces – one open and one covered. Boyd prepared four colour schemes for flat-buyers to select from.

== Key design influences and construction ==
Boyd was influenced by his interest in Walter Gropius and TAC’s Interbau 1957 Berlin housing development. He was also informed by Japanese Metabolist ideals of living spaces as stacking trays and Paul Rudolph’s notions of spatial platforms. Boyd viewed the residential tower block as the solution to the increasing population concentrations around city centres, interpreting Australian architectural styles from a modernist perspective. Thus, he favoured 'honest' use of materials, without added ornament, and a box-like simplicity to express function.

=== Construction ===
The initial criteria set out by client Lend Lease and contractors Civil & Civic were for the maximum possible number of residential units under Australia's Uniform Building Regulations and a design to take advantage of newly introduced planning and building height laws. Negotiations and initial planning ideas were conducted with Boyd and his then practice Grounds, Romberg and Boyd, with Boyd working alone for the remainder of the project. The final plan was his creation.

Access to views was to dominate the planning process. Boyd placed the apartments on an east–west axis, to maximise the views of the Botanic Gardens to the north and Port Phillip Bay to the south. Each main room was to have both north and south views and the block was planned to be narrow enough to accommodate this, with main rooms spanning the width of the block. Room height was used to convey a sense of spatial compression and ensure occupants remained aware of the views to the outside world.

Construction of the basement and garage began in 1959. The building was then put on hold, due to a financial downturn in the economy. Building work did not resume until a year later. The vertical lift towers were built first using slip forming, and then used to transport materials for the construction of the remainder of the building.

== Reception and criticism ==
The building was completed in 1962 and initial reception was mixed. Criticism was aimed at the building's visibility from the Botanic Gardens, with some local residents starting an association to oppose further high rises along the park front. Sales were slow at first and, although it later developed waiting lists, this is thought to have negatively affected the relationship between Boyd and his client.

The artist and critic for The Age Arnold Shore criticised the two lift towers as: "monstrous excrescences". Boyd replied: "It is, of course, the convention in conventional buildings to clothe structure as if it were as rude as the nude human body, while the exposing of air-conditioning ducts and such equipment is considered positively pornographic. Yet to most serious architects, the idea of covering important elements of the system which makes the building stable and workable is objectionable".

== See also ==
- Architecture of Melbourne
- Australian residential architectural styles
- Robin Boyd Award
