= Hugo Ganz =

German journalist

Dr Hugo Markus Ganz (24 April 1862 – 2 January 1922) was a German-Jewish political and literary writer and journalist for the German newspaper Frankfurter Zeitung and Swiss newspaper Neue Zürcher Zeitung.

== Biography ==
Ganz was raised in Mainz in the Grand Duchy of Hesse and worked as a political and literary writer and journalist for the Frankfurter Zeitung. This German newspaper had stationed him in Budapest in the Austro-Hungarian Empire in the 1890s for which he had taken on the Austro-Hungarian nationality. In Budapest, Hugo Ganz met his wife Maria Török (1872–1926) with whom he had two children: Margarete Ganz (1893–1975) and Josef Ganz (1898–1967).

Around the turn of the century, the Ganz family relocated to Vienna, where the family-house became a meeting point for members of state, famous scientists and prominent artists such as Franz von Bayros (1866–1924). In Vienna, Hugo Ganz was appointed as the Präsident des Verbandes der auswärtigen Presse (President of the Foreign Press Association).

During the first three months of the Russo Japanese War (1904–1905), Hugo Ganz was stationed in St Petersburg in Russia, where he wrote the widely read book, Vor der Katastrophe (published in 1904; Dutch edition: "Vóór het ineenstorten, een blik in het ondergaande Czarenrijk", ed. P.M. Wink, Amersfoort, 1904, Swedish edition "Före katastrofen - en blick in i tsarriket", Beijers bokförlags AB, Stockholm 1904)). In the book, he referred explicitly to a dichotomy between "Russia" and "the civilised people of the West".

Other books from his name include Der Rebell (published in 1900), Reiseskizzen aus Rumänien (published in 1903), Die Preußische Polenpolitik (published in 1907) and Der Bundesbruder (published in 1915).
