= Standard Superior =

German automobile brand

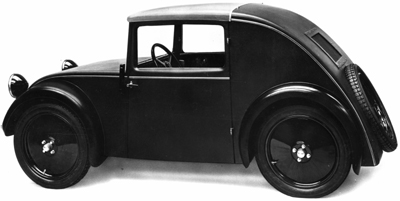
First model of the Standard Superior, as introduced at the IAMA in Berlin in 1933

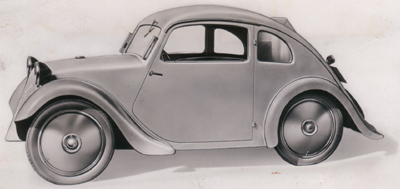
Standard Superior, 1934 model

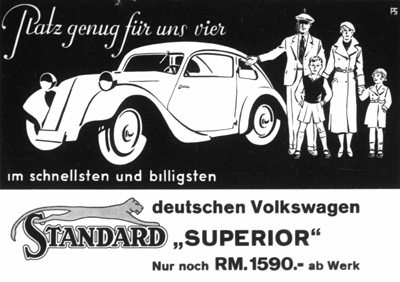
Brochure for the Standard Superior, 1934

The Standard Superior was an automobile, produced from 1933 to 1935 by Standard Fahrzeugfabrik of Ludwigsburg, Germany, founded by motorcycle maker Wilhelm Gutbrod and unrelated to the Standard Motor Company of England. These small cars were designed according to the patents by Josef Ganz and featured rear-mounted two-stroke engines.

After World War II, the same company made Gutbrod cars and introduced the model Gutbrod Superior.

== History ==
In the first half of 1932, Wilhelm Gutbrod, the President of the Standard Fahrzeugfabrik, came into contact with German engineer Josef Ganz. Ganz had been working on a small car design since the early 1920s and had so far built two prototypes, one for Ardie in 1930 and one for Adler in 1931, called the Maikäfer (May Beetle). After a demonstration with the Maikäfer by Ganz, Gutbrod was most interested in building a small car according to this design. The Standard Fahrzeugfabrik then purchased a license from Ganz to develop and build a small car according to his design. The prototype of this new model, which was to be called Standard Superior, was finished in 1932. It featured a tubular chassis, a rear mid-mounted engine, and an independent wheel suspension with swing-axles at the rear.

== Models ==
The first production model of the Standard Superior was introduced at the IAMA (Internationale Automobil- und Motorradausstellung) in Berlin in February 1933. It had a transverse 396cc, two-cylinder, two-stroke engine mounted in front of the rear axle. Because of some criticism to the body design, not in the least by Josef Ganz in Motor-Kritik, it was followed in April 1933 by a slightly altered model.

In November 1933 the Standard Fahrzeugfabrik introduced yet another new and improved model for 1934, which was slightly longer with one additional window on each side and had a small seat for children or as luggage space in the back. This car was advertised as the German "Volkswagen" (a term that means, literally, "people's car").

== The Volkswagen Beetle connection ==
With the Ardie-Ganz, Adler Maikäfer and Standard Superior cars, as well as his progressive writings and promotion of the concept of a Volkswagen (people's car) in Motor-Kritik magazine since the 1920s, Josef Ganz is claimed by some to have had input into the Volkswagen Beetle. These cars had some of features of the later Volkswagen Beetle, such as the tubular chassis, rear-mounted engine and independent wheel suspension with swing axles. While the Volkswagen Beetle was produced in its millions after World War Two, the name of Josef Ganz was largely forgotten. In 2004, Dutch journalist Paul Schilperoord started researching the life and work of Josef Ganz, and in 2011 he published The Extraordinary Life of Josef Ganz: The Jewish Engineer Behind Hitler's Volkswagen.
