= Ardie =

German motorcycle manufacturer

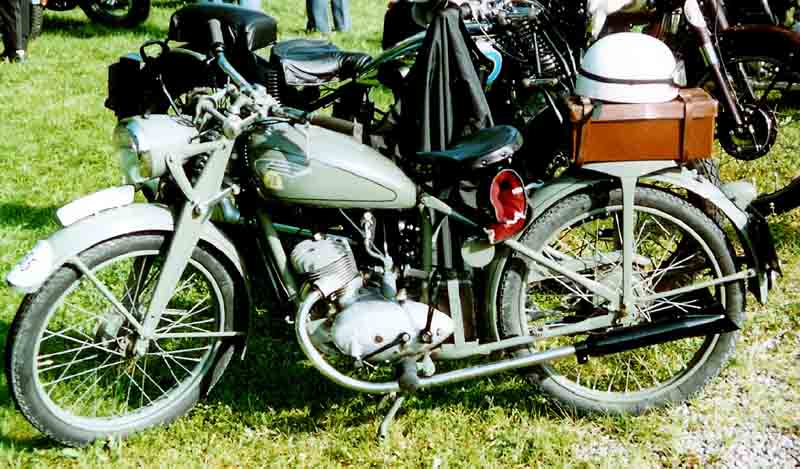
Ardie

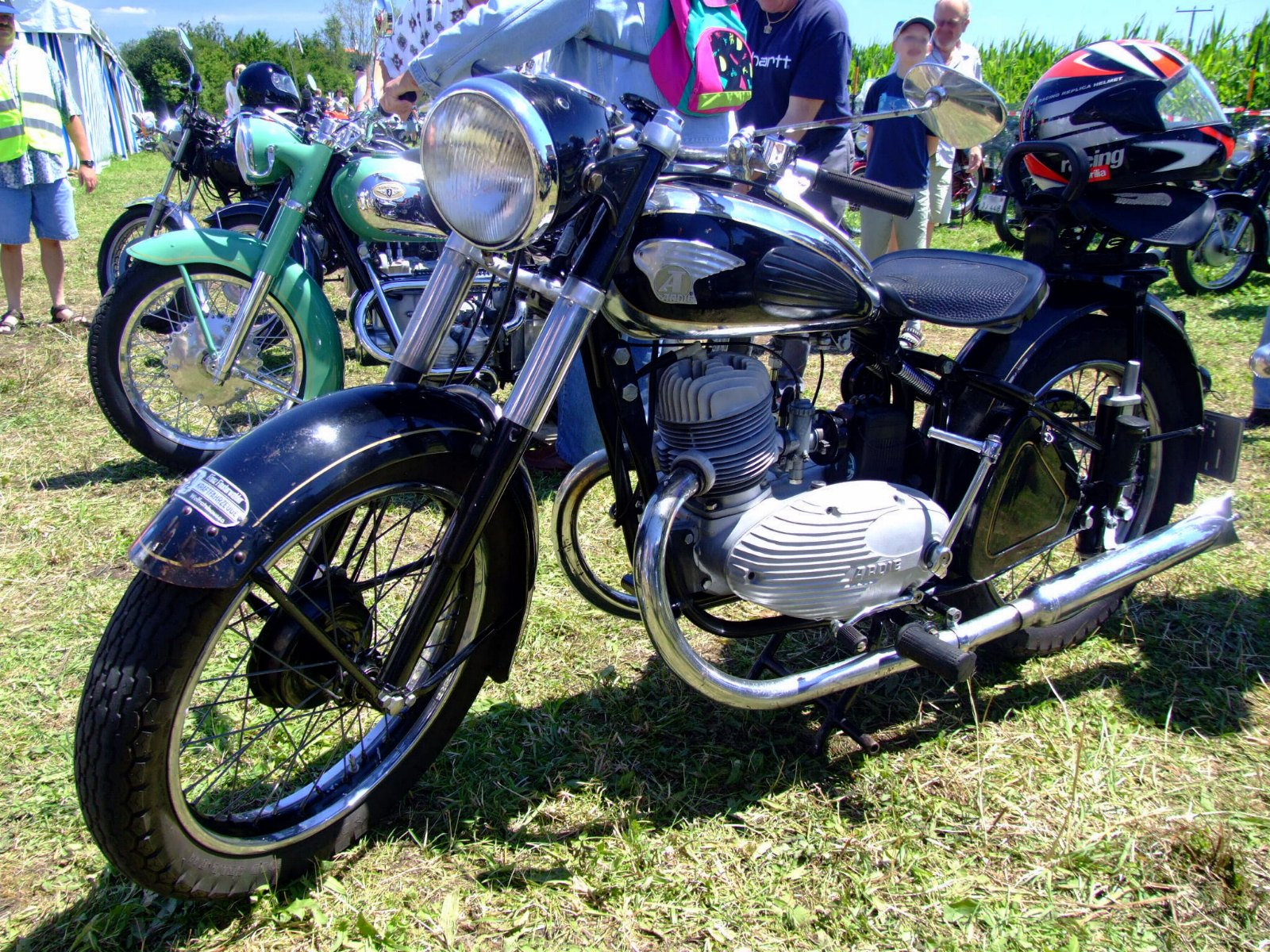
1952 10 bhp Ardie

Ardie was a company in Nürnberg, Germany that manufactured motorcycles from 1919 until 1958. The company's name derives from that of its founder, Arno Dietrich.

At first Ardie made motorcycles with its own 305cc and 348cc single cylinder two-stroke engines. Dietrich was killed in a racing accident in 1922, and the company was taken over by the Bendit company. In 1925 the company switched to using engines from JAP in London, England, that ranged from 246cc through 996cc. Their specifications included one of the earliest uses of aluminum-alloy frames on a mass-produced motorcycle. In the 1930s Ardie switched again to engines made by the German companies Bark, Kūchen and Sachs.

In 1930, Ardie President Willy Bendit assigned German engineer Josef Ganz to build a prototype of a small Volkswagen according to his design. This Ardie-Ganz prototype was finished in September 1930 and achieved highly successful road-test results. The car featured a tubular chassis, mid-mounted engine, and independent wheel suspension with swing-axles at the rear.

In 1936 the company returned to making motorcycles with two-stroke engines of its own manufacture. During the Second World War the company made a model with Ardie's own design of 350cc twin-cylinder side-valve four-stroke engine. After the war the company was taken over the Durkoop factory and made a range of single and twin-cylinder machines ranging from 122cc to 344cc.
