= Ernest Fooks =

Australian architect (1906–1985)

Dr Ernest Fooks
- Fooks, c. 1970
- Born: Ernest Leslie Fuchs; 6 October 1906; Bratislava, Austria-Hungary
- Died: 4 December 1985 (aged 79); Melbourne, Australia
- Education: Vienna Technical University
- Occupation: Architect
- Spouse: Noemi Matusevic (m. 1939)
- Buildings: Lansell Road House, Toorak; Shaw House, Toorak; Ernest Fooks House; Adass Israel Synagogue

Dr Ernest Leslie Fooks (born Ernest Leslie Fuchs, 6 October 1906 – 4 December 1985) was an Australian architect, born and trained in Europe, who contributed to architecture, town planning, and design education and to the cultural life of Melbourne, Victoria during the second half of the twentieth century.

== Early life ==
Ernest Leslie Fuchs was born in 1906 in Bratislava, Czechoslovakia, when it was part of Austria-Hungary. His family moved to Vienna in 1908 where he studied architecture at the Vienna Technical University, and completed a doctorate in Technical Science with a major in Town Planning, and opening his own architectural practice in 1932. Facing extreme anti-Semitism, in 1939 Fuchs migrated to Australia via Canada, where he married his Latvian born wife, Noemi Matusevic (née Noemija Matusevics). They arrived in Melbourne in April, and he soon gained a position as a town planner with the Housing Commission of Victoria. In 1944 he was appointed the first lecturer in town planning at the Melbourne Technical College (now the Royal Melbourne Institute of Technology). In 1945 he became an Australian citizen and anglicised his name to Fooks. Three years later he resigned from Housing Commission Victoria and opened his own practice. In August 1948 he was elected Associate of the Royal Institute of British Architects, and was later elected President of the Jewish Society of Arts.

== Key influences and design approach ==
Fooks was a key proponent of the Modernist International movement in Australian architecture. Like his contemporary Robin Boyd, Fooks had relatively few opportunities to design major buildings and is best known for his numerous residential projects. From 1950, his firm designed over forty apartment blocks in and around the eastern suburbs of Melbourne. By the mid-1950s, his practice expanded to take on commercial projects including La Ronde jewellery shop on Collins Street, the Capri Espresso Bar in Footscray, and the Public Trustees Building in Exhibition Street.

=== Apartments ===
Fooks saw apartment living as a necessity in successful urban planning. His book Xray the City: The Density Diagram, Basis for Urban Planning, was published in 1946 with a foreword by H.C. Coombs, the Director-General for the Ministry of Post-War Reconstruction, and showcased Fook's ideas and voiced concerns regarding construction and environments in post-war Melbourne. He was the first to discuss the issue of increasing urban density, well ahead of government legislation acknowledging the same issue more than half a century later. Fooks noted that density alone was not responsible for poor urban living conditions, but that the quality of urban living was related to socioeconomic factors, community life and access to quality housing and open spaces for leisure.

=== Houses ===
Fooks created houses of architectural significance with individual, and highly creative designs which combined analytical planning with aspects of Scandinavian and European modern design and incorporated principles of traditional Japanese architecture. Fooks' residential architecture underwent three distinct phases, the first of which expressed post-war austerity through conventional forms and finishes.

==== Early period, 1948 to 1953 ====
There was a common and straightforward vocabulary in Fooks' early houses which included plain face cream or yellow brickwork, basic hipped or gabled terracotta roofs and simple double-fronted facades. Though these early designs were simple in form, Fooks' was beginning to introduce sophisticated modernist ideas and features. His Sternberg House in Kew (1948) was designed on the "principles of solar control" and incorporated almost full-height windows, glazed doors, and generous paved terrace areas.

==== Middle period, 1954 to 1959 ====
Fooks' middle period exhibited an International Modern style, characterised by low-pitched, flat and butterfly roofs, and bold massings of box-like forms that projected and receded to create striking spaces of solids and voids in finishes of brick and feature stonework. His Appel House in Caulfield North (1955) was a two-storey flat-roofed house with generous windows, and cream brick walls relieved by a broad stone-clad chimney, and simple but elegant metal balustrades to the first floor balcony and roof terrace above.

==== Later period, from 1960 ====
Finally, Fooks' Mature, Minimalist style was characterised by efficient structural forms, a reduced palette of materials, generous amounts of glass and elegantly simple details. His domestic projects involved complex and carefully detailed multi-layered open-plan living and thoughtfully constructed surrounding landscapes. His Lansell Rd House (1963) is of aesthetic significance for its high level of craftsmanship in joinery and finishes in folding and sliding screens and built-in teak furniture and cabinetry.

In 1964, Fooks designed a house for himself and Noemi at 32 Howitt Road in Caulfield North; that was added to the Victorian Heritage Register in 2009 in recognition of its architectural, aesthetic, and historical significance.

=== Other significant works ===
He designed the National Jewish Memorial Centre and Community Facility in Canberra, which was completed in 1971.

== Selected projects ==
The following is a selected list of Fuch's architectural projects.

Project	Image	Date	Location	Description	Notes
Park View Flats			5 Herbert St, St Kilda		
			647 Inkerman St, Caulfield North		
			35 Kooyong Rd, Caulfield North		
			162 Brighton Rd, Ripponlea		
Kluska Flats			55 Wanda Rd, Caulfield North		
			7 Kooyong Rd, Armadale		
			16 Khartoum St, Caulfield North		
			20 Cardigan St, St Kilda East		
			6 Bella Vista Rd, Caulfield North		
			5 The Ave, Windsor		
			3 Struan St, Toorak		
			28 Power St, Toorak	Originally "Majestic Court", 8 Power St, Malvern	
			510 Gelnferrie Rd, Hawthorn		
Flats		1960	20 Denmark Hill Rd, Hawthorn East		
Heyington Gardens		1962	2 Theodore Ct, Toorak		
Ernest Fooks House		1964	32 Howitt Rd, Caulfield North	Added to the Victorian Heritage Register	
National Jewish Memorial Centre		1971	31 National Circuit, Forrest, Canberra		

== Legacy ==
Fooks died in Melbourne on 4 December 1985 aged 79. The annual Ernest Fooks Memorial Award was established in his honour by the University of Melbourne for excellence in architectural design. A retrospective exhibition titled "In Quest & Praise of Indigenous Architecture" was held at the Caulfield Arts Complex in 1989.

== Awards ==
The Adams House, on Lansell Road in Toorak, was voted Family Home of the year by Australian House and Garden magazine in 1966.

== Exhibitions ==
- ‘Cities of Yesterday’, Kozminsky Galleries, Melbourne, March–April 1944
- ‘Two-faced Metropolis’, Kozminsky Galleries, Melbourne, October 1952
- ‘Tribal Architecture, Tribal Villages’, Caulfield Arts Centre, March 1980
- ‘Travels throughout the world’, Caulfield Arts Centre, August 1984
- ‘In quest and praise of indigenous architecture and folk art, a Retrospective’, Caulfield Arts Complex, October 1989
- ‘45 Storeys. A Retrospective of works by Melbourne Jewish Architects from 1945’, National Gallery of Victoria, March 1993.
- ‘N:Notable and Modern. Post-War domestic architecture in the City of Glen Eira’, Exhibition at Glen Eira City Gallery, July 2001.
