= Motor-Kritik =

Automotive magazine in Germany

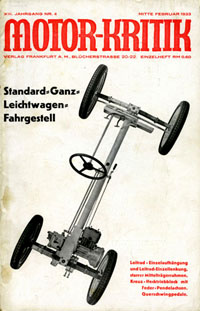
Front cover of Motor-Kritik magazine, issue 4, February 1933, showing the innovative chassis of the Standard Superior designed by its editor-in-chief Josef Ganz

Motor-Kritik was the title of a progressive automotive magazine, published by the H.Bechhold Verlagsbuchhandlung in Germany from 1929 to 1945. It originated from the earlier Klein-Motor-Sport magazine.

== History ==
Klein-Motor-Sport was the title of a German magazine about motorcycles and small cars, founded by Civil-Ing. Oscar Ursinus and published from 1922 to 1929.

Publishing house H.Bechhold Verlagsbuchhandlung took over the unprofitable title in 1927. In order to revitalize the magazine, the publisher assigned the young progressive engineer and critical automotive journalist Josef Ganz as editor-in-chief. He started as from the first issue of January 1928. Josef Ganz used Klein-Motor-Sport as a platform to criticize heavy, unsafe and old-fashioned cars and promote innovative design. The magazine quickly gained in reputation and influence and, in January 1929, was renamed into the more appropriate title Motor-Kritik.

‘With the ardent conviction of a missionary’, so post-war Volkswagen director Heinrich Nordhoff would later say, ‘Josef Ganz in Motor-Kritik attacked the old and well-established auto companies with biting irony.’ These companies fought against Motor-Kritik with lawsuits, slander campaigns and an advertising boycott. However, every new attempt for destruction only increased the publicity for the magazine and Josef Ganz firmly established himself as the leading independent automotive innovator in Germany.

As a Jew, however, Josef Ganz was forced to resign as editor-in-chief by the Gestapo in 1933. His position was taken over by his colleague Georg Ising, who remained editor-in-chief throughout the Second World War until the termination of the magazine in 1945.
