= Kriéger Company of Electric Vehicles =

French electric vehicle manufacturer

Kriéger Company of Electric Vehicles (Société des Voitures Électriques Système Kriéger) manufactured electric vehicles in Paris, France from 1898 to 1909.

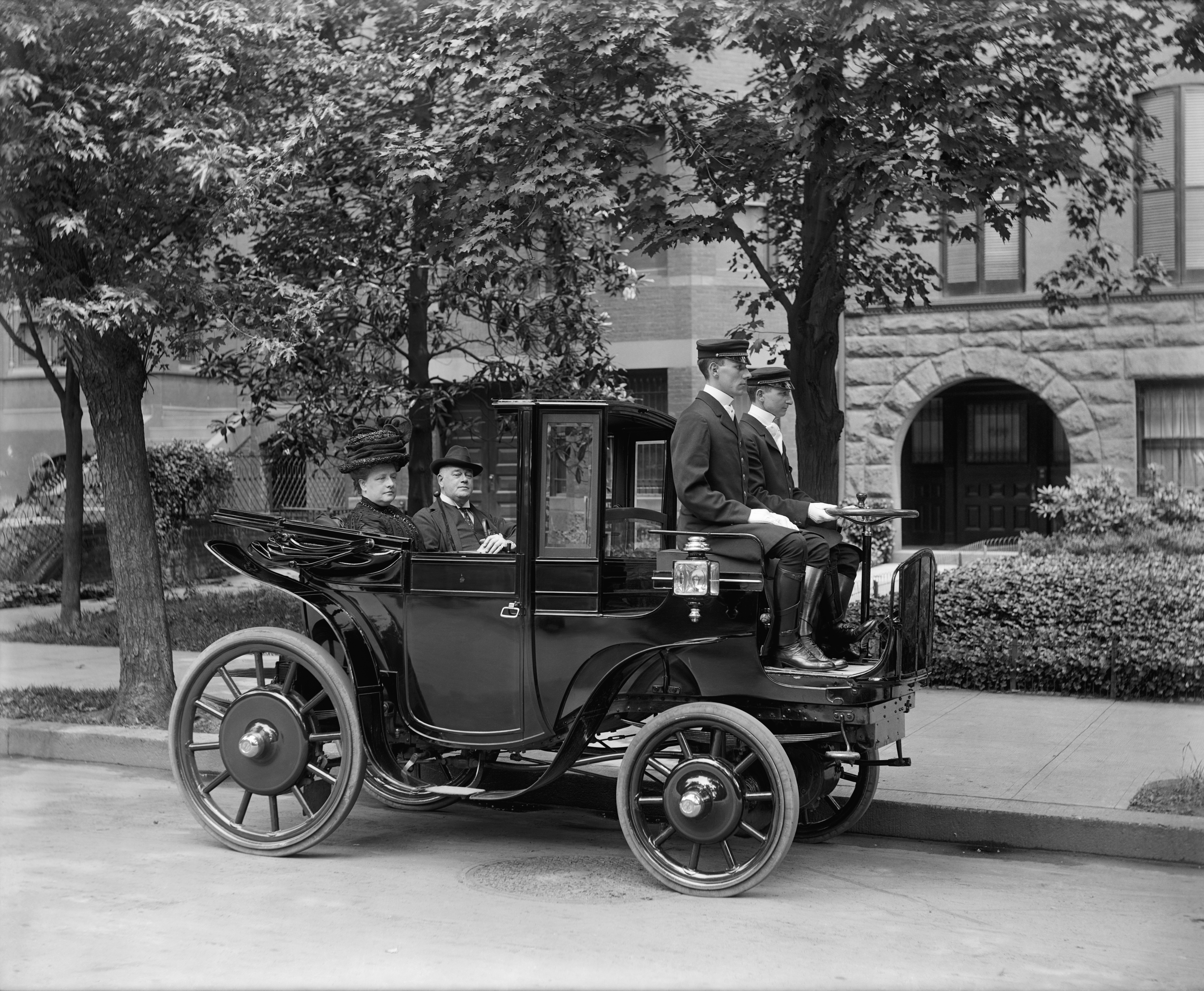
George P. Wetmore's Landaulette, c. 1906

== History ==
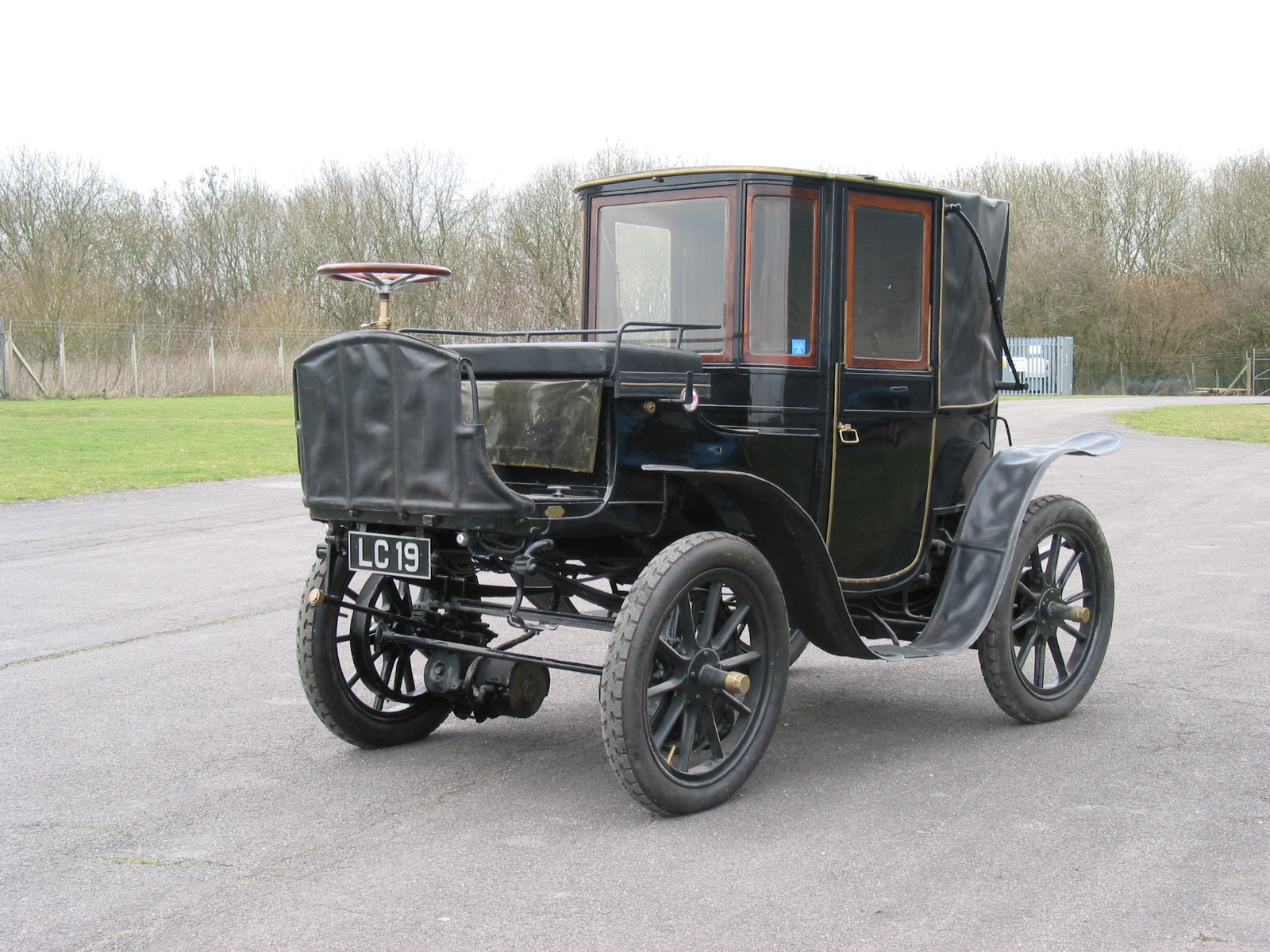
Brougham 1904

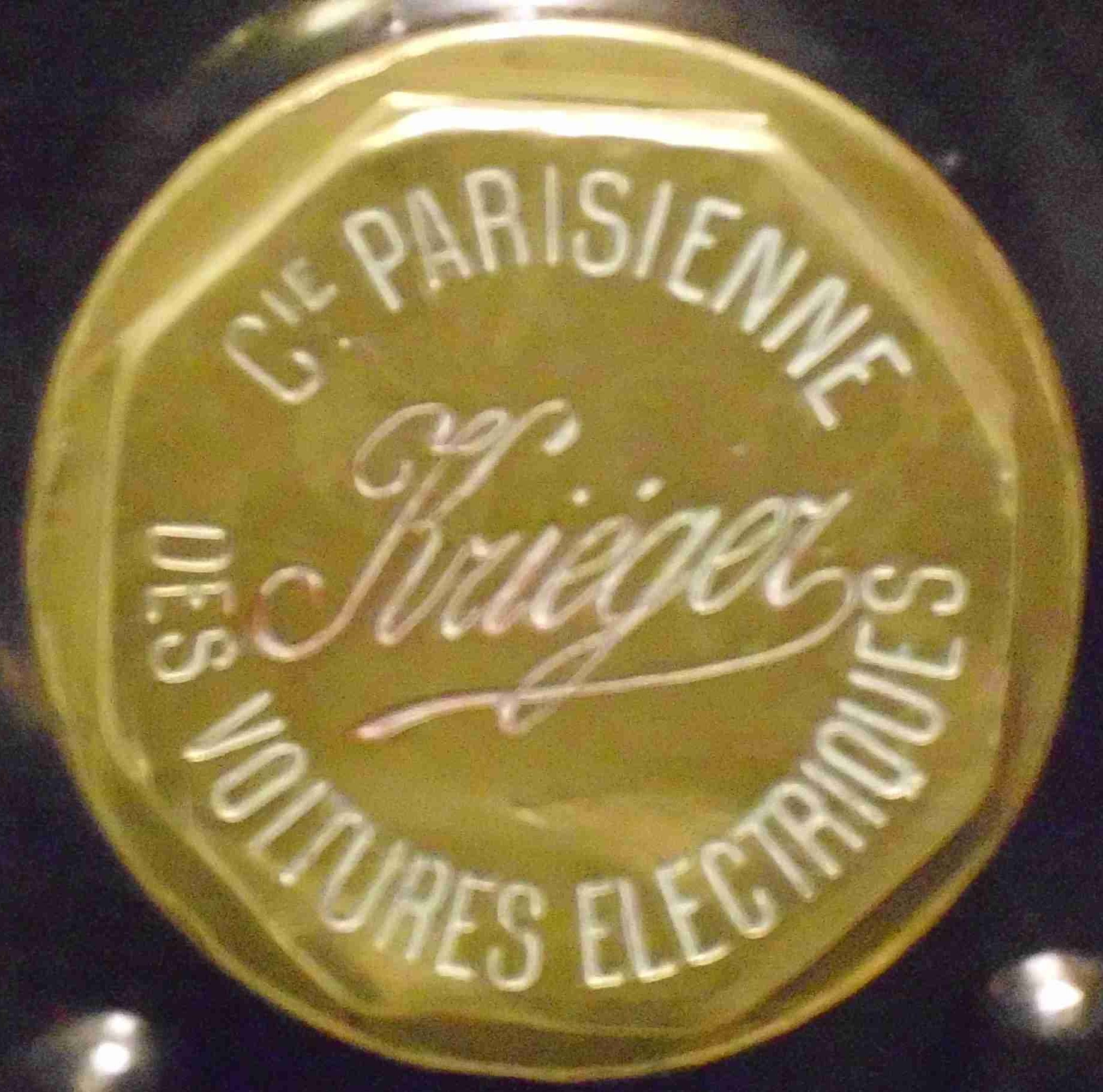

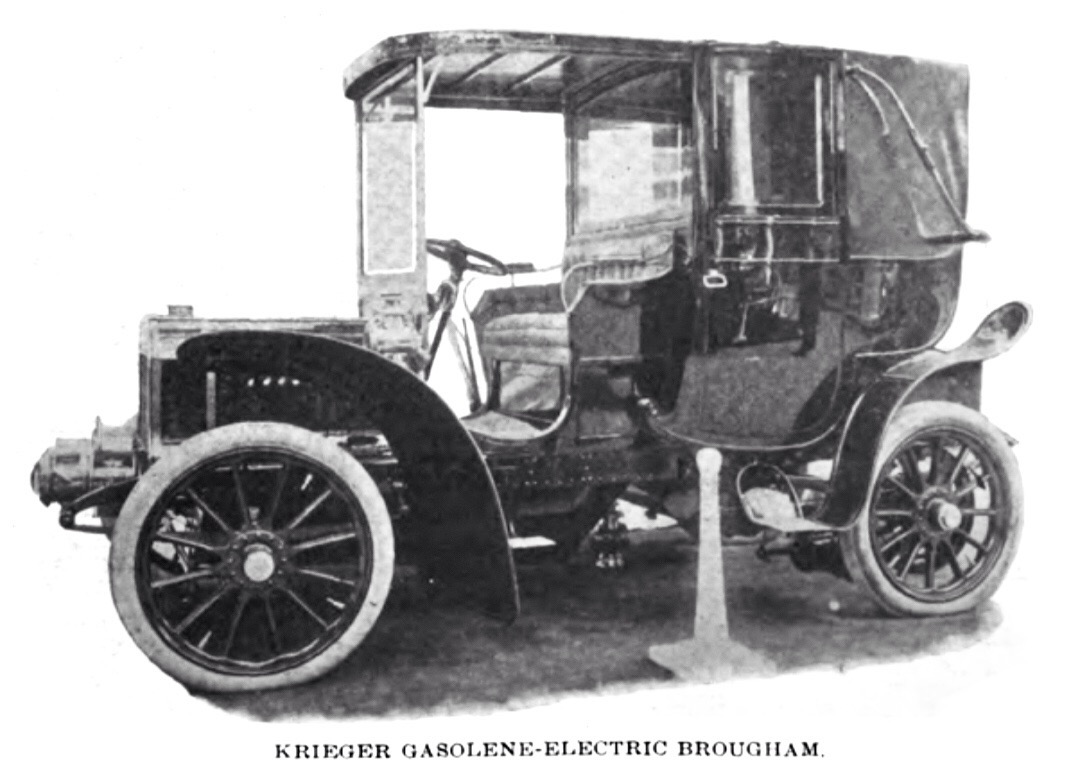
Kriéger hybrid electric vehicle (1904)

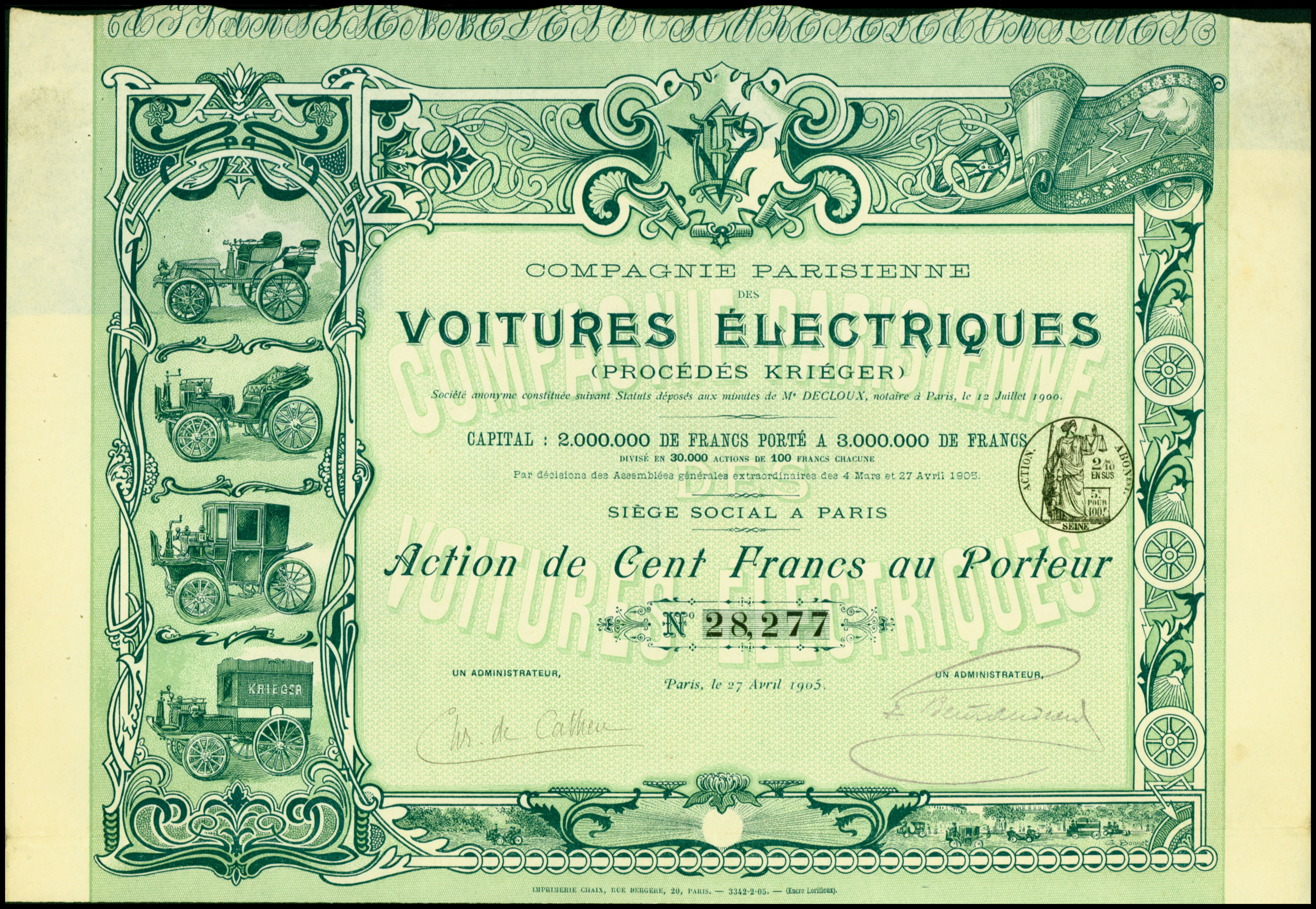
Share of the Compagnie Parisienne des Voitures Électriques, issued 27. April 1905

In 1894 Louis Antoine Kriéger (1868–1951) of Paris, France began designing and building electric automobiles. By 1898, when electric powered vehicle interest increased in France, Kriéger organized the Kriéger Company of Electric Vehicles.

Brougham, Landaulette and Electrolette were three of the models produced. In 1901 43 electric vehicles were produced. In 1902 at least 65 were produced. Kriéger produced or assisted in several racing vehicles including one called 'Powerful' in 1900.

The Electrolette was a two-person vehicle. Next to each front wheel was an electric motor of 2.2 kW (3 hp) each. The pinion comes out at the side next the wheel and engages with a large gear wheel which is fixed against it. The gear and pinion are enclosed in a tight case, thus each wheel is turned independently by its own motor. The 360 kg (800 lb) of Fulmen batteries are contained in a box which is fixed in the vehicle below the carriage body and is arranged so that it may be easily slid out from the rear. Kriéger claimed at least 105 km (65 mi) on a single charge. The 770 kg (1,700 lb) 2.2 kW (3 hp) Electrolette on a level grade could do 34 km/h (21 mph), or 19 to 24 km/h (12 to 15 mph) over an average road.

Kriéger automobiles were pioneers of regenerative electric brakes. In 1903 Kriéger produced an early hybrid electric vehicle (HEV) with front wheel drive, power steering and a petrol engine that supplemented the battery pack.

The Kriéger Company manufactured electric vehicles until 1909. Louis Antoine Kriéger continued design work for some time, including the use of the Electrolette name.

== Gallery ==
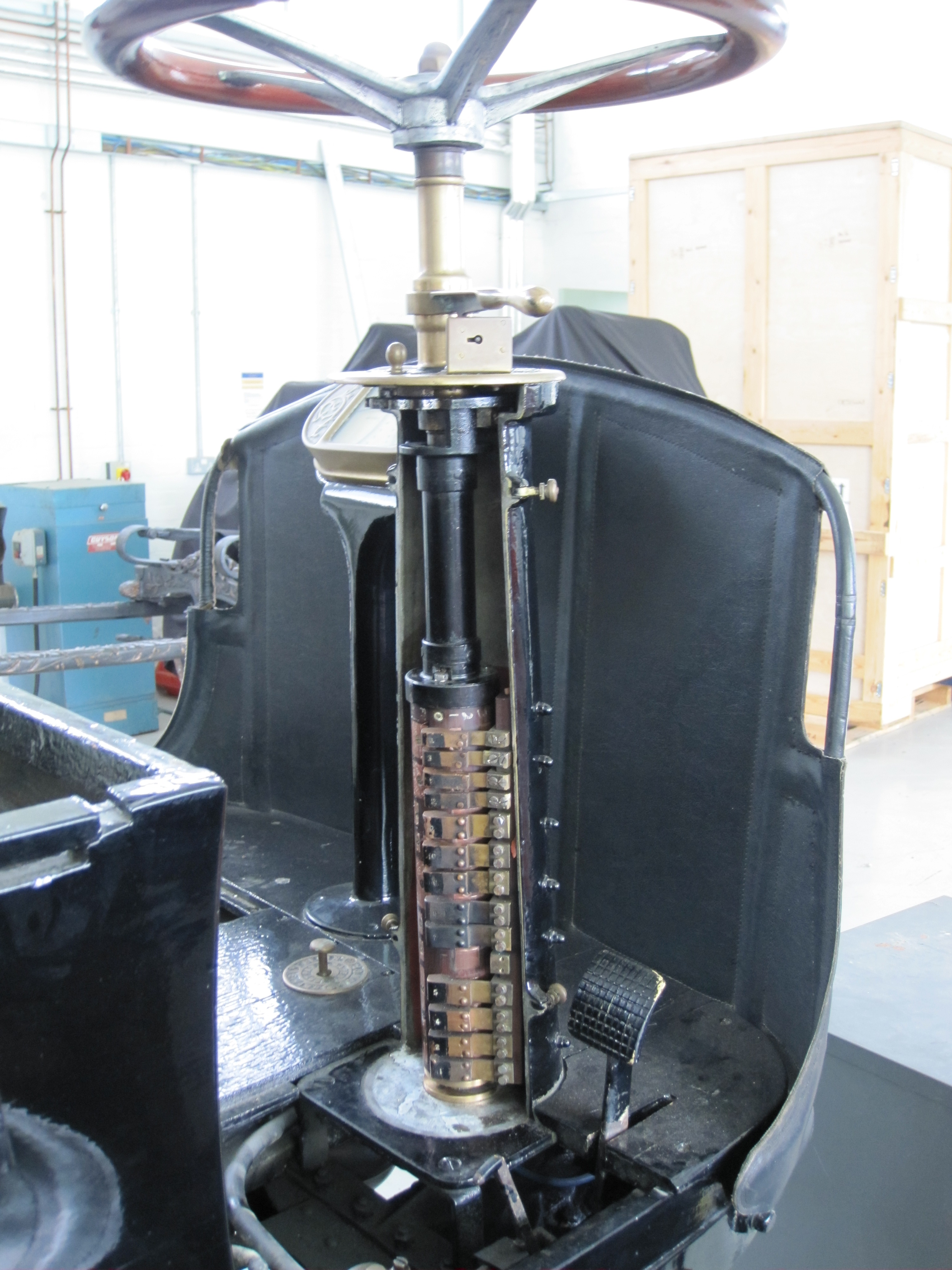

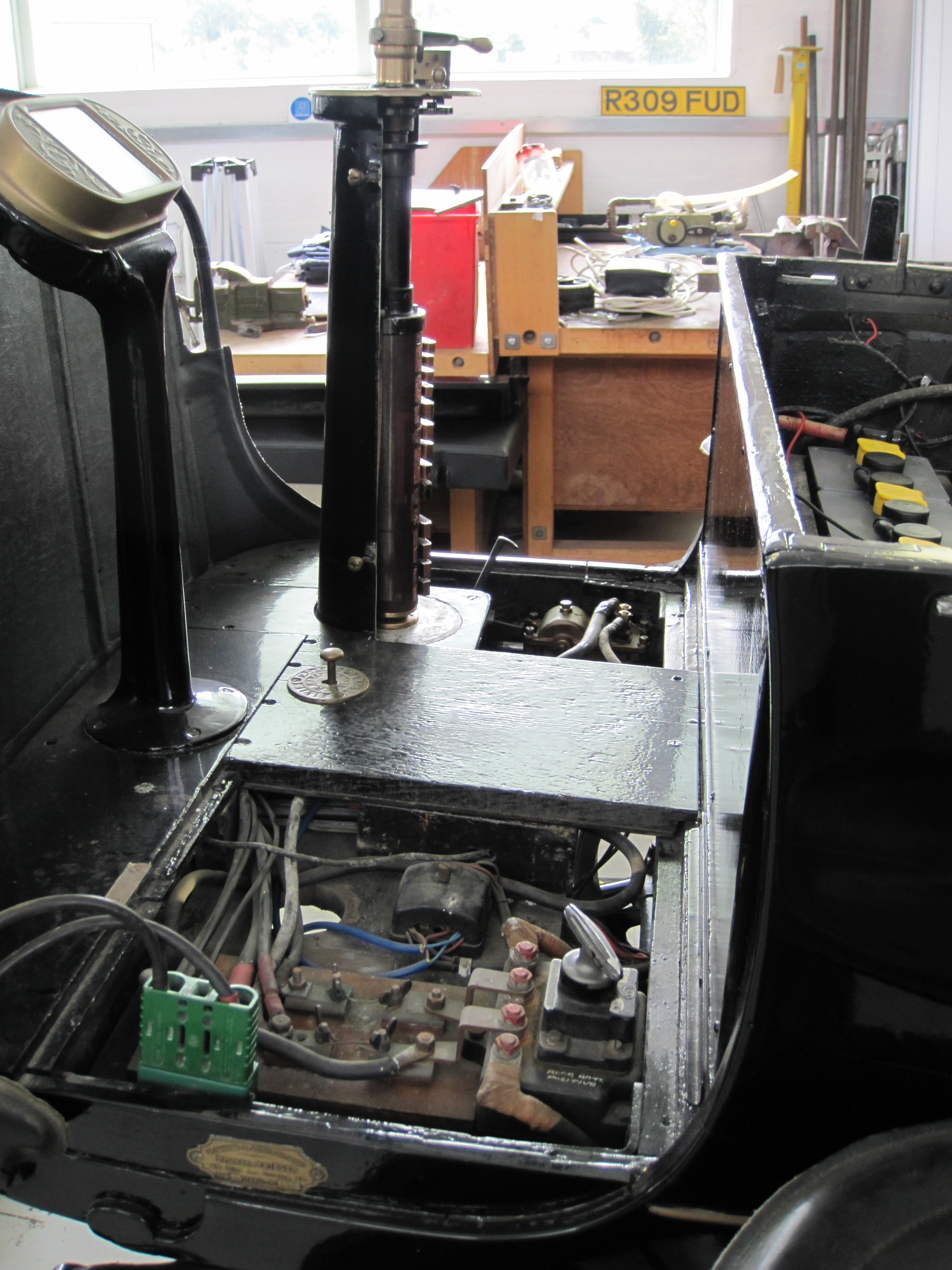

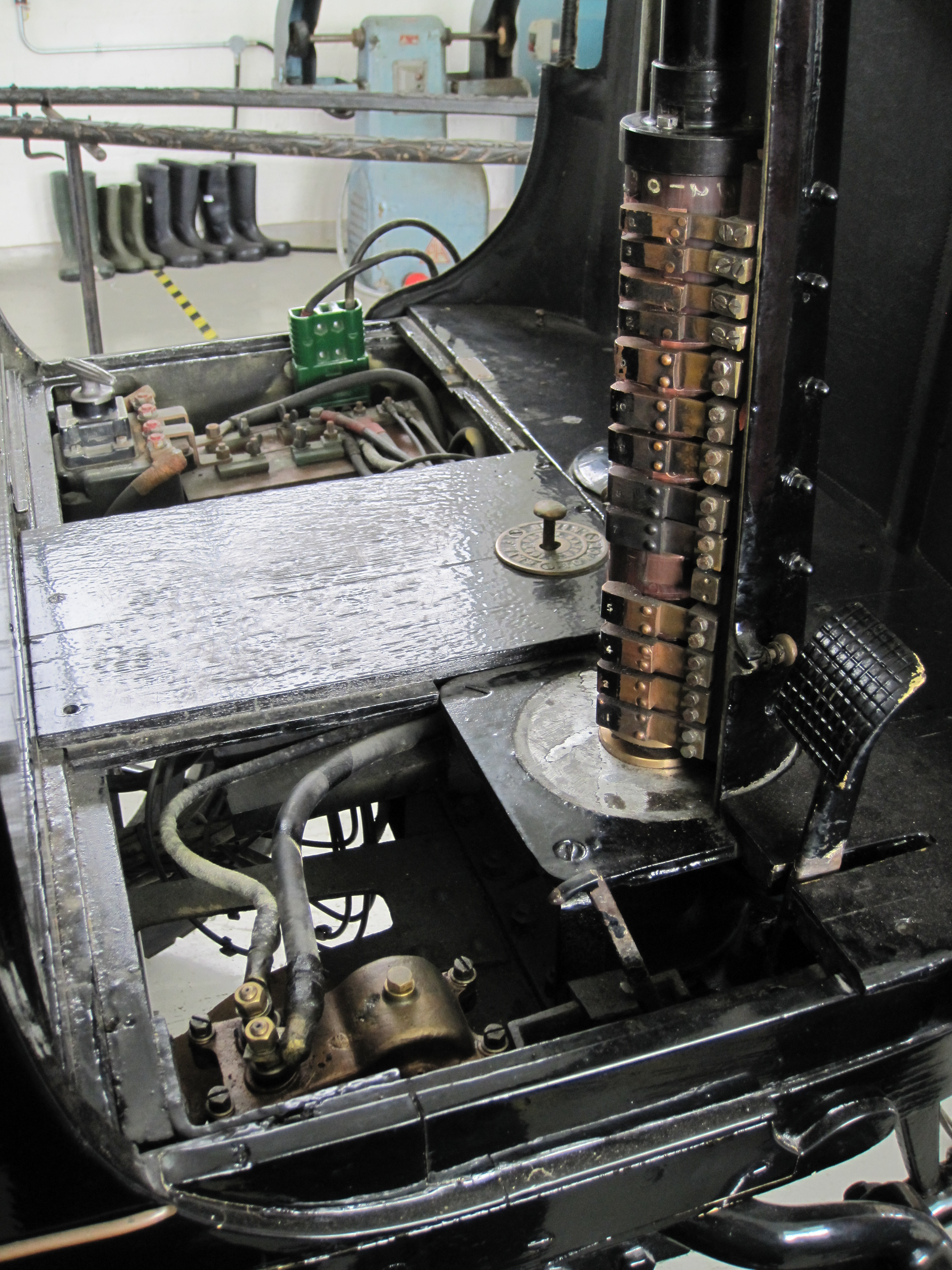

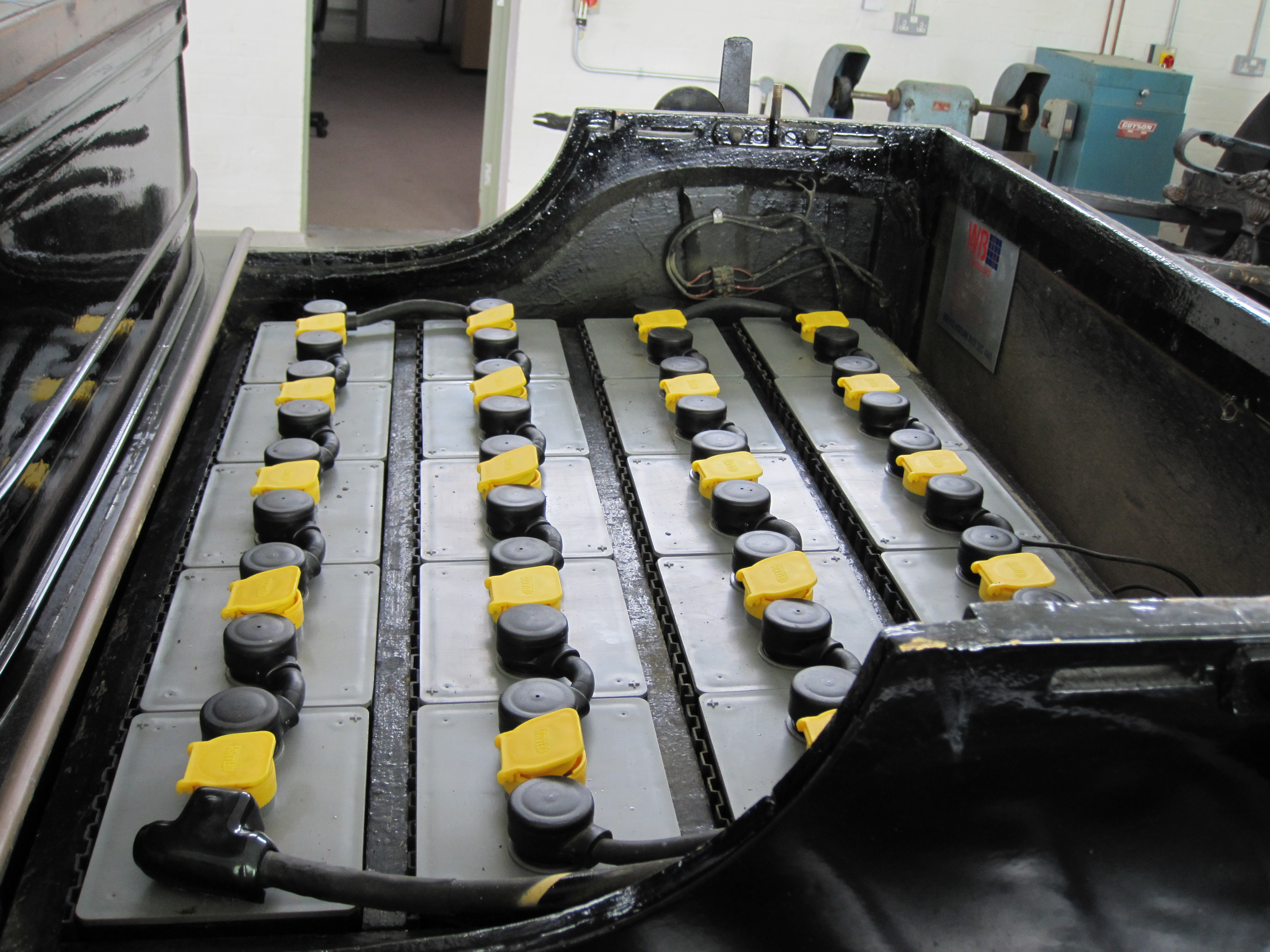

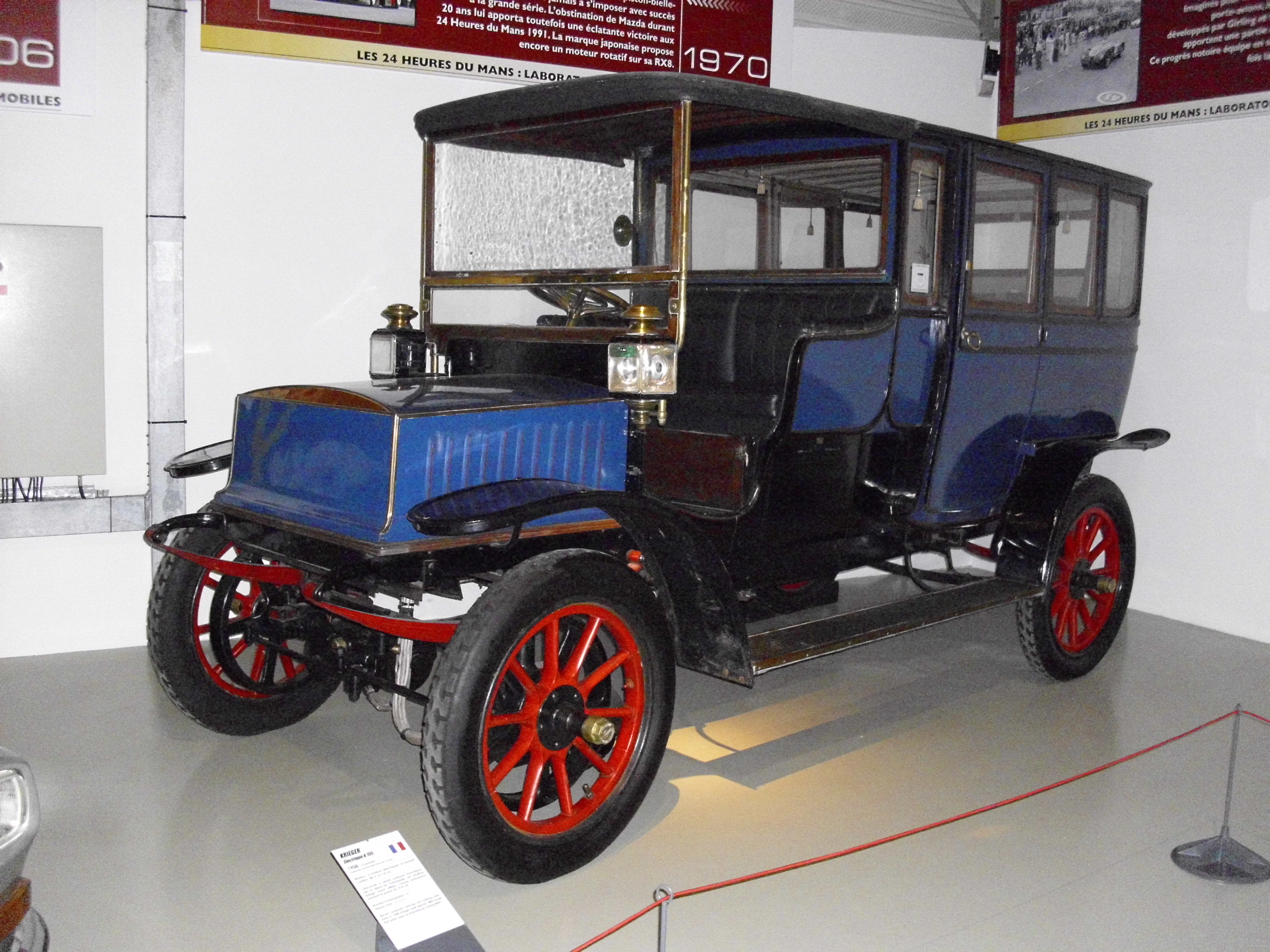

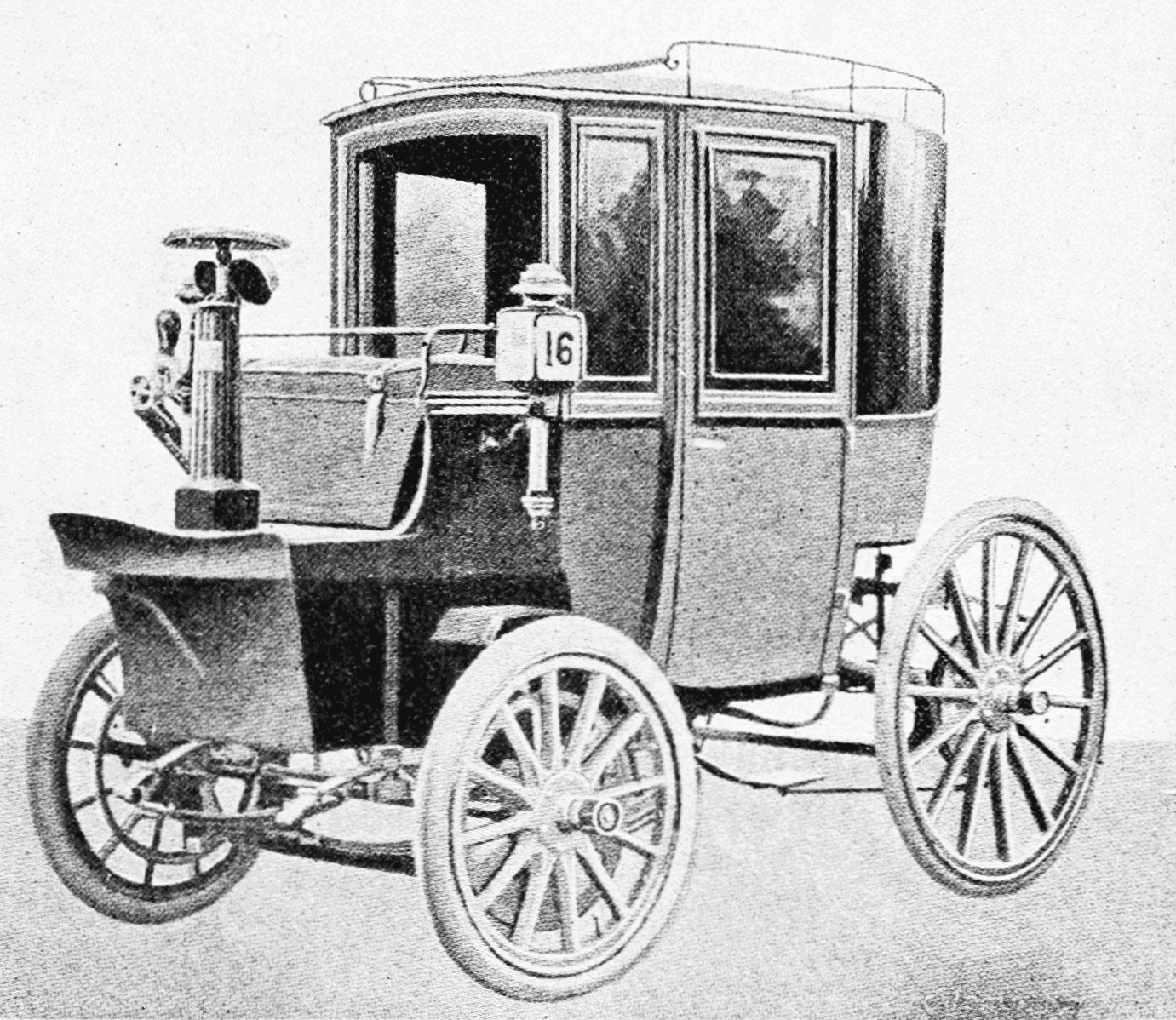

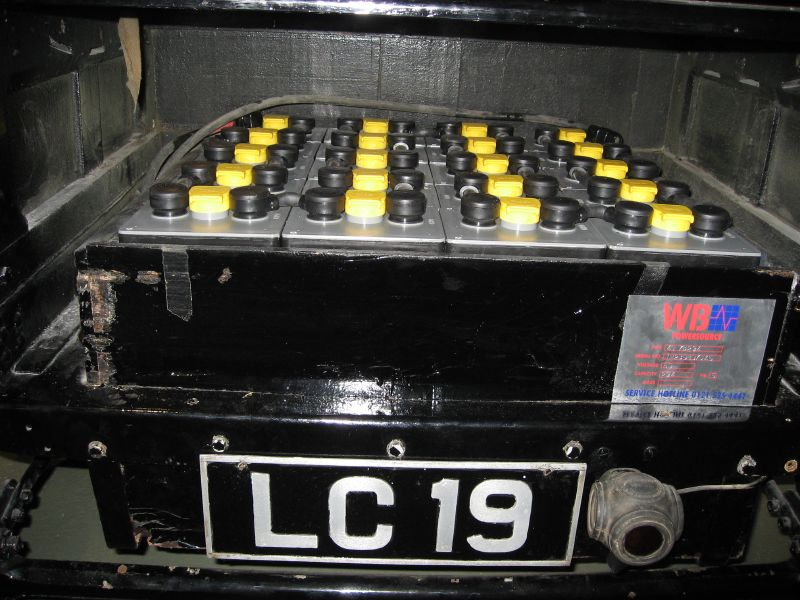

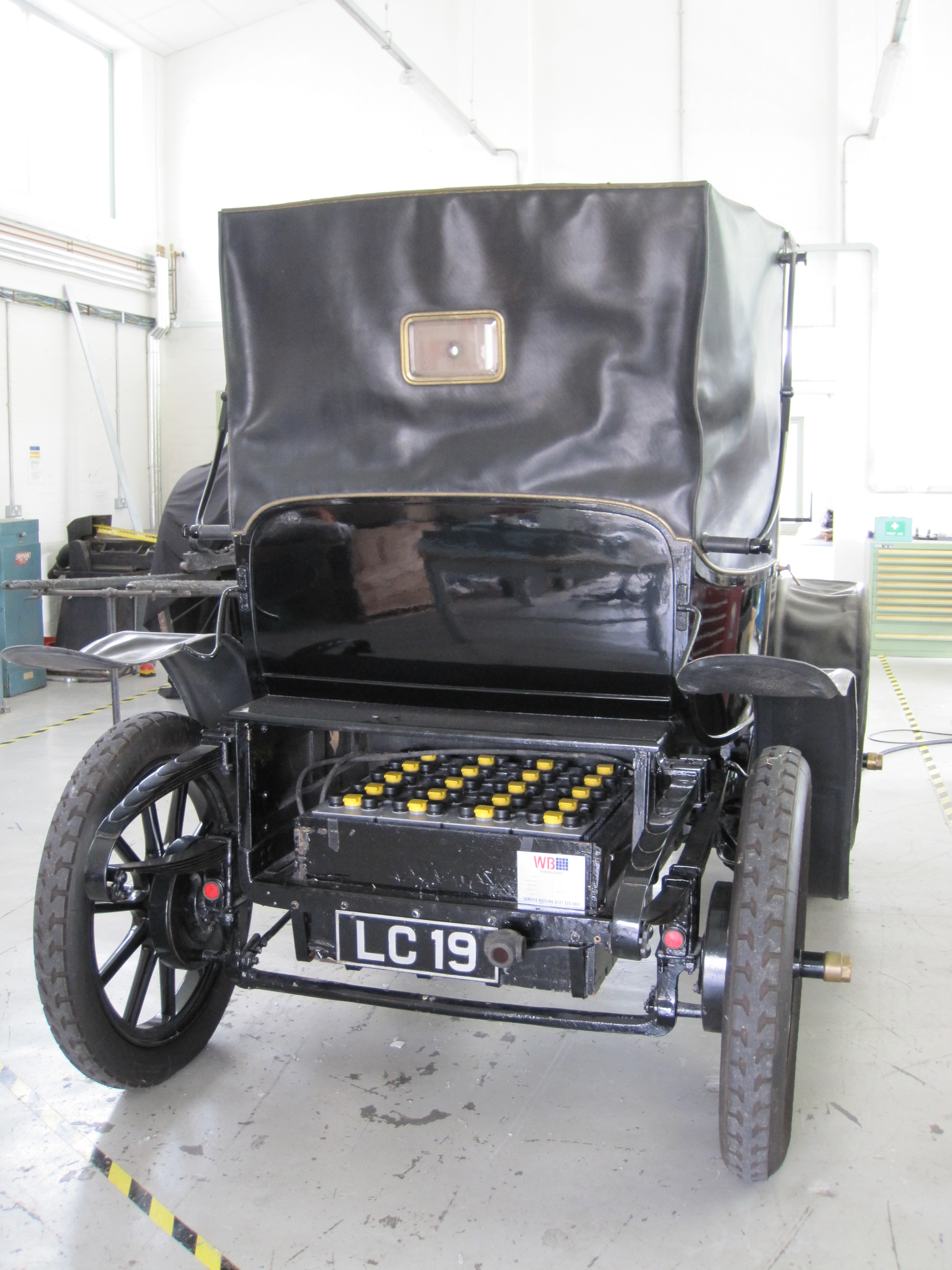

== See also ==
- List of French cars
- Timeline of motor vehicle brands
