= Fulmen Batteries =

Lead-acid battery brand

Fulmen
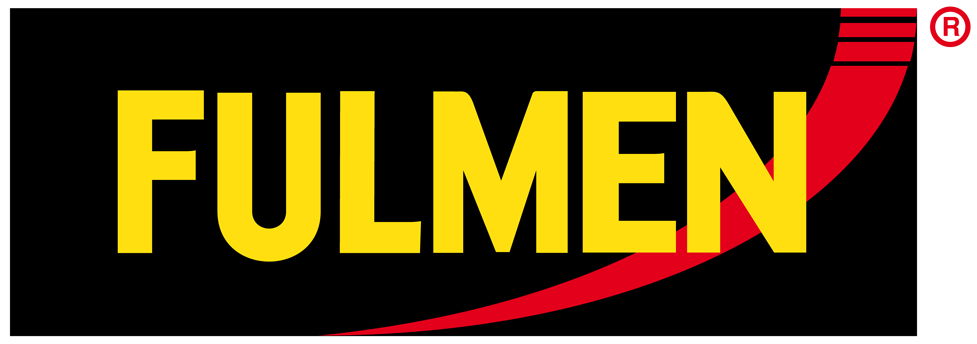
- Industry: Lead-acid battery
- Founded: 1891; 135 years ago
- Founders: Albert Brault
- Key people: Camille Brault, Julien Le Cesne
- Website: http://fulmen.info/

Fulmen is a lead-acid battery brand now owned by Exide Technologies. It was an independent company until the 1970s.

== History ==
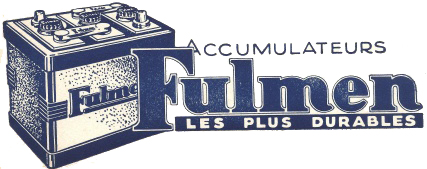
Logo Fulmen in 1900

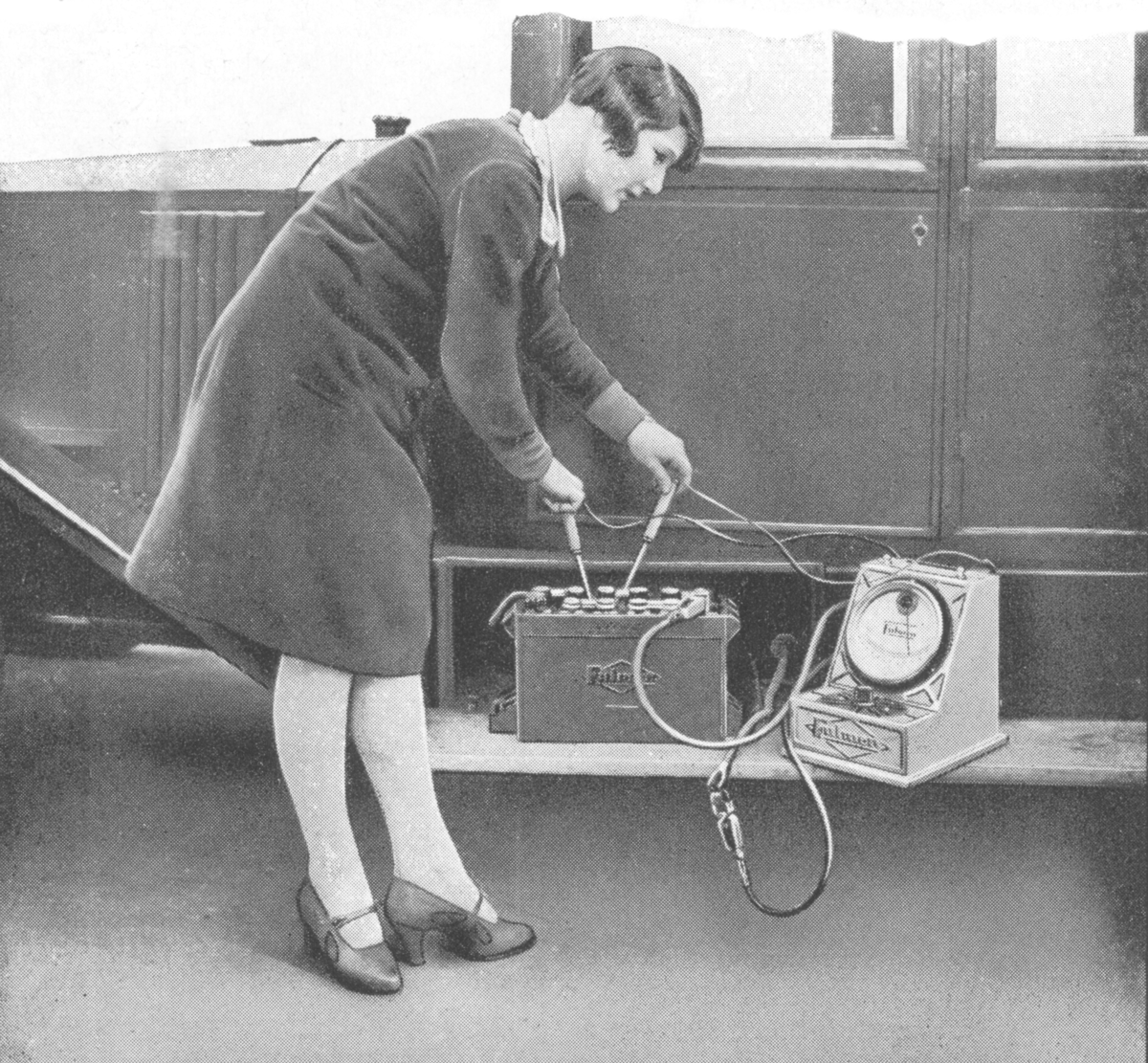
Fulmen Device for Measuring Battery Voltage

The 'société de l’accumulateur Fulmen' was founded in 1891 by Albert Brault. In 1892, Fulmen opened its first factory in Clichy. During the following years Fulmen opened other plants all across France (Vierzon, Nanterre, Auxerre, Nîmes, Chasseneuil and Poitiers). In 1894, the first automotive fiacre created by Louis Kreiger used a Fulmen battery located between the two front wheels. Four years later, Fulmen batteries equipped the Narval submarine.

=== Globalization ===
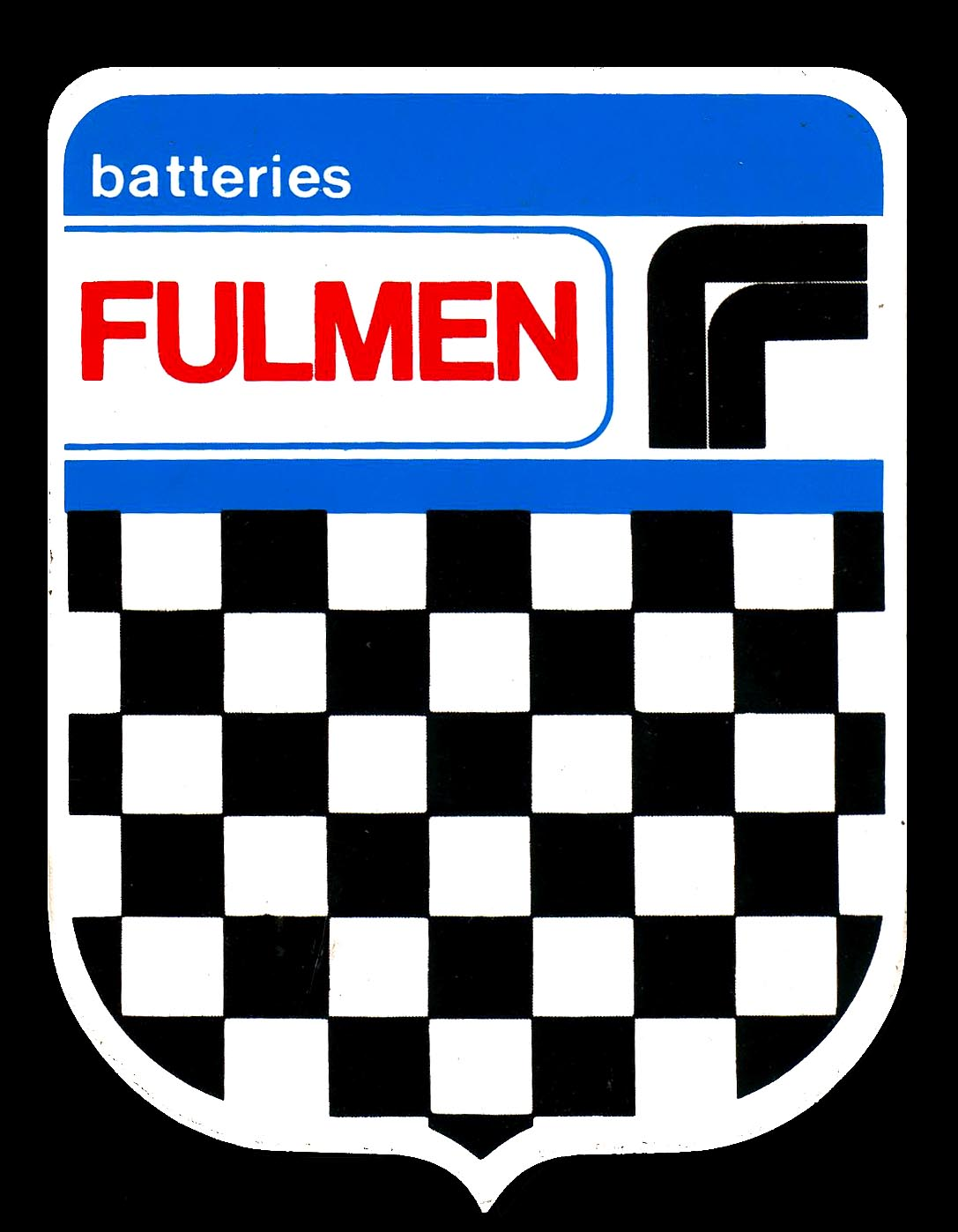
Fulmen logo in the 1970s

1924: The CGE (Compagnie Générale électrique) bought Fulmen France.

1925: Fulmen battery sales in Belgium led the company to create 'La société Belge de l’accumulateur Fulmen' (The Belgian society of Fulmen accumulator).

1974: The merge between Fulmen France and the CGE becomes the CEAC.

1982: Merging of the commercial networks between Fulmen/Tudor/Dinin.

1989: Repurchase of the rights of use of the Fulmen brand in Belgium by the CEAC.

Fulmen brand is now part of Exide Technologies since they bought the CEAC in 1993.

== Performance ==
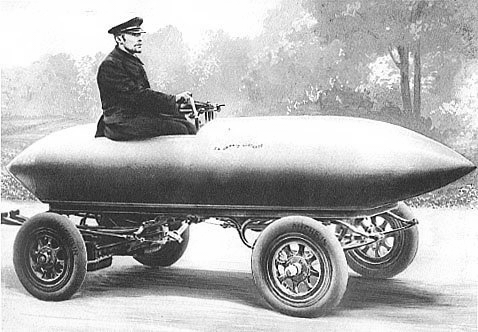
La Jamais Contente

In 1895, the double phaéton Jeantaud took part in the Paris-Bordeaux race by changing its Fulmen battery each 40 Kilometers at every relay.

In 1899, "La Jamais Contente" electric car was the first car in the world which exceeds 100 km/h (62 mph) It was equipped with a Fulmen battery.

In 1906, one of the Fulmen battery established a world record without recharge. It travelled 307 km between Paris and Châtellerault.

== Others ==
Fulmen proposed many services:

- A quarterly newspaper which provided information for specialists. It had advice, technical documentation and news about Fulmen and the battery market. The newspapers was free on demand.
- Fulmen-service: equipment department which provided machines to optimize the control, maintenance, recharge and repair of Fulmen batteries.
- Fulmen agency: Fulman gave panels to independent electricians. Those electricians were checkeds by Fulmen society and had the ability to change a Fulmen battery. The list of these electricians were published in the Fulmen newspaper.

== Bibliography ==
- Manuel pratique des batteries de démarrage, H. Perrier, Fulmen (in French)
