= Brass Era car =

Automotive manufacturing era (1896–1915)

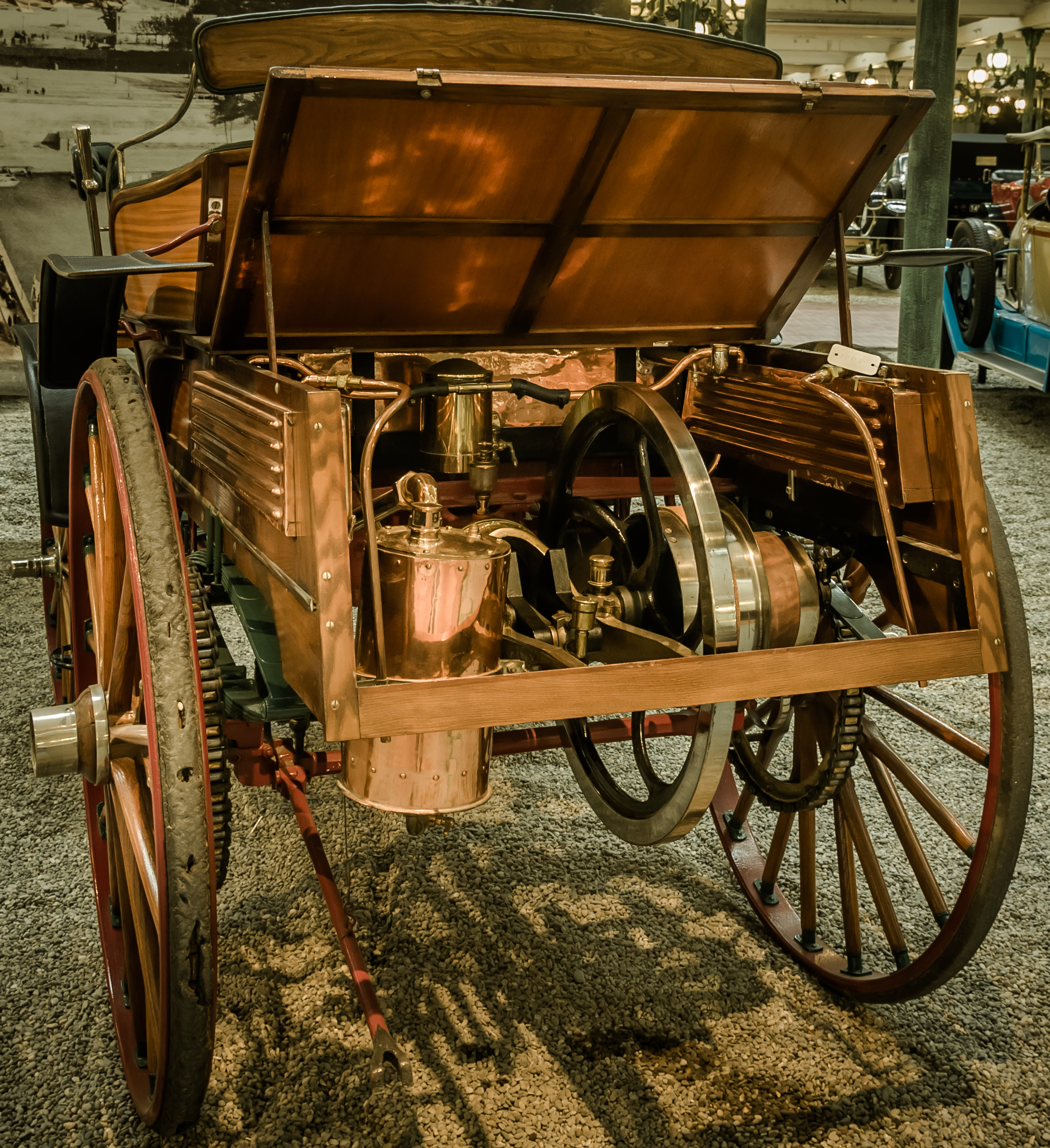
Copper and brass on show in the engine of a Benz Vis-à-Vis (1893)

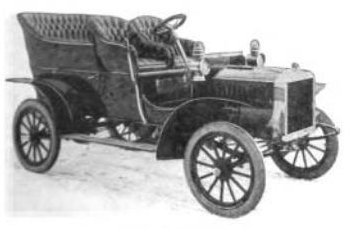
1905 Jackson Model C

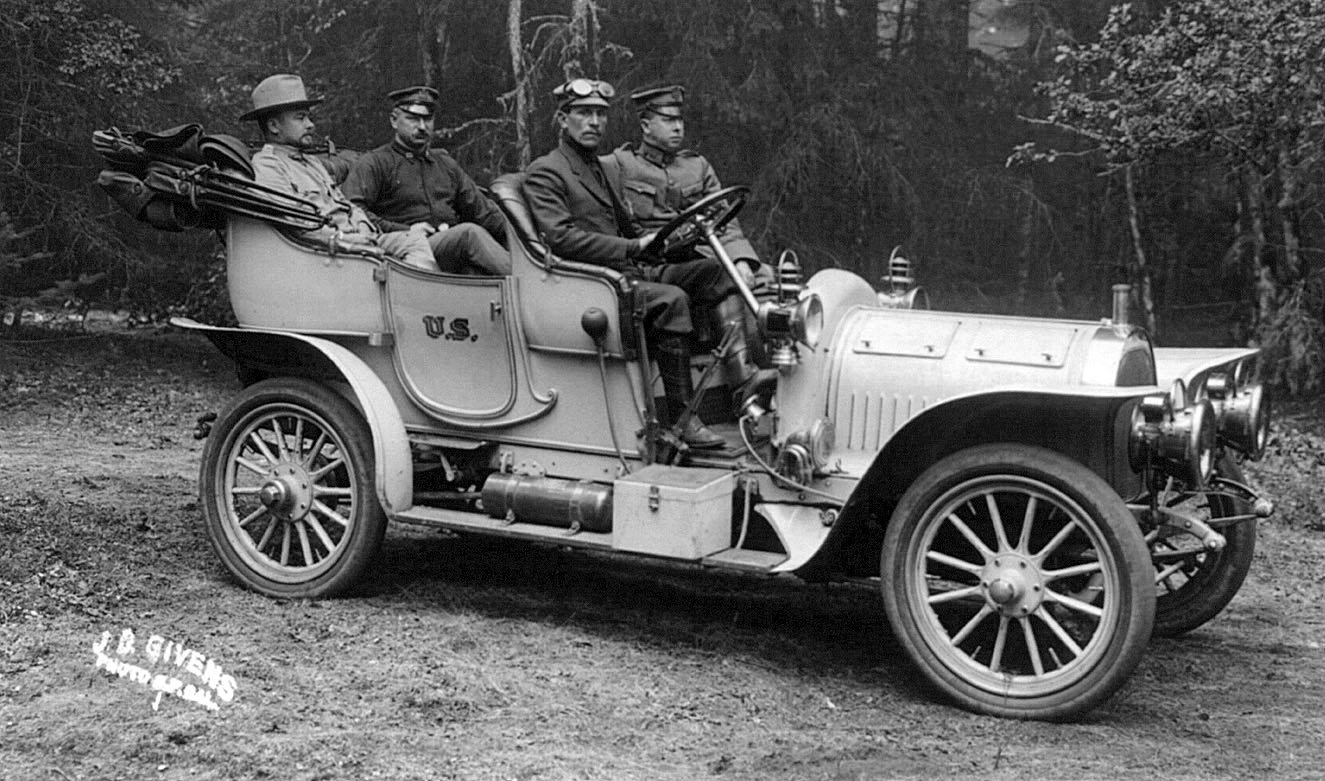
A Royal Tourist model US Army vehicle, circa 1906. The vehicle was the conveyance of General Frederick Funston (leftmost figure in the back seat).

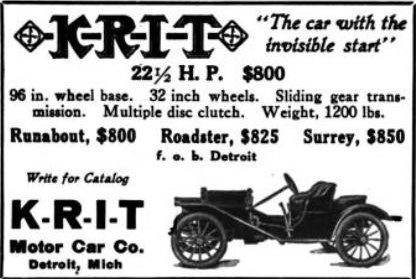
A 1911 K-R-I-T advertisement

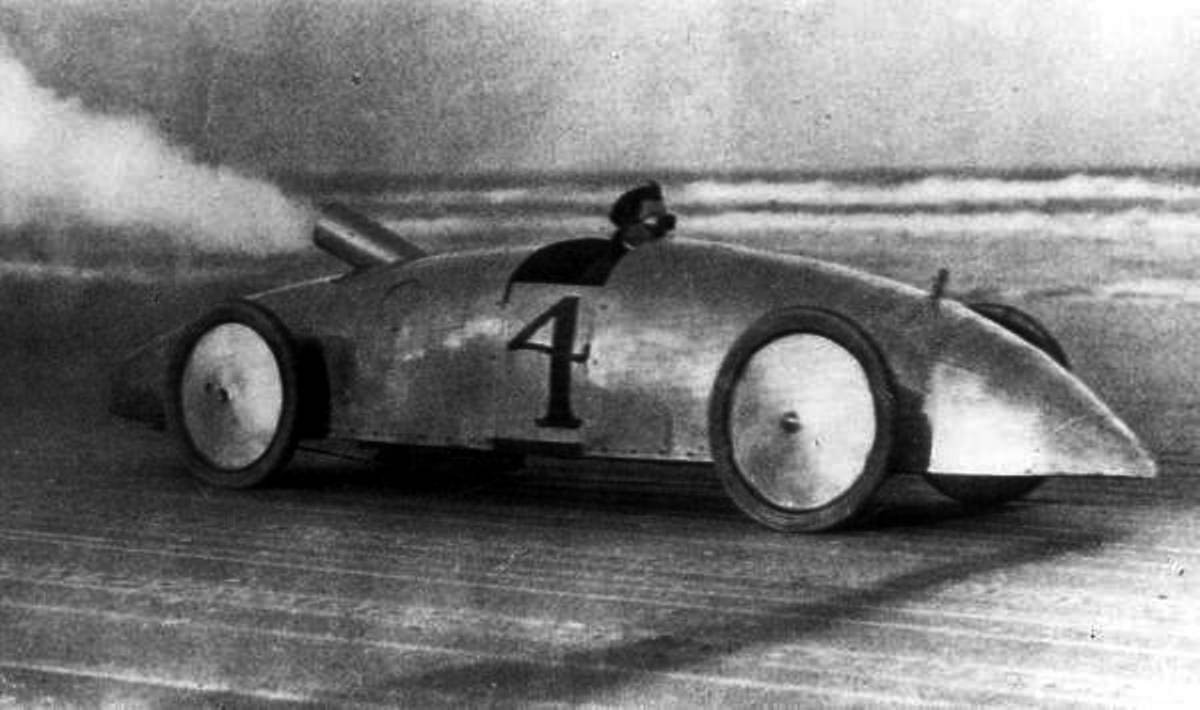
A Stanley Steamer racecar in 1903; in 1906, a similar Stanley Rocket set the world land speed record at 127.6 miles per hour (205.4 km/h) at Daytona Beach Road Course

The Brass Era is an American term for the early period of automotive manufacturing, named for the prominent brass fittings used during this time for features such as lights and radiators and even under the hood. It is generally considered to encompass 1896 through 1915, a time when cars were often referred to as horseless carriages.

Elsewhere in the world, this period would be considered by antique car enthusiasts to consist of the veteran (pre-1904), and Edwardian eras, although these terms are really not meaningful outside the former British Empire.

== Overview ==
Early automakers turned to brass for their vehicles for both its looks and function. It held up well against tarnishing and bad weather, but required regular polishing to maintain its appearance.

Though the automobile was invented a few years before the start of the Brass Era, the 20 years that make up this era represent the beginning of the automotive industry. It was a period of small-scale manufacturing, experimental designs, and alternative power systems. The middle of this period saw the introduction of Panhard et Levassor's Système Panhard, a front-engine, rear-drive design that became the industry standard for decades.

Through this period, electric, gasoline, and steam propulsion power were the powertrains of choice, though gas-powered internal combustion engines were dominant by the end of this period. Various body styles were also in vogue at the time, including the high-wheel motor buggy (resembling the horse buggy of before 1900), runabouts, tonneaus, and other more expensive closed bodies.

The vehicles most closely associated with the Brass Era were larger, more expensive luxury vehicles, such as those built by Packard, Peerless, Pierce-Arrow, Cadillac, and other premium manufacturers.

1915, the agreed-upon cutoff of the Brass Era, was the final year the Ford Model T was available with brass fitments. At this point the style had also begun to be considered outdated, and by the 1920s few if any vehicles continued to employ brass in their designs.

== Technology ==
In the early part of this period, steam-car development had advanced, making steam cars some of the fastest road vehicles of their day. Electric cars also held a market share throughout the era.

Development of automotive technology was rapid, due in part to hundreds of small manufacturers competing to gain the world's attention. Key developments included the electric ignition system (by dynamotor on the Arnold in 1898, though Robert Bosch, 1903, tends to get the credit), independent suspension (actually conceived by Bollée in 1873), and four-wheel brakes (by the Arrol-Johnston Company of Scotland in 1909). Leaf springs were widely used for suspension, though many other systems were still in use.

Transmissions and throttle controls were widely adopted, allowing a variety of cruising speeds, though vehicles generally still had discrete speed settings, rather than the infinitely variable system familiar in cars of later eras. Safety glass also made its debut, patented by John Wood in England in 1905, but would not become standard equipment until 1926 on a Rickenbacker. Angle steel took over from armored wood as the frame material of choice, and in 1912, Hupp pioneered the use of all-steel bodies, joined in 1914 by Dodge.

== Lists of North American manufacturers of this era ==
=== Frank Leslie's Popular Monthly 1904 list ===
In January, 1904, Frank Leslie's Popular Monthly magazine catalogued the entire range of automobiles available to the mass market in the United States. This list included:

- American Darracq Automobile Company (New York, New York)
- Apperson Brothers Automobile Company (Kokomo, Indiana)
- Auburn Automobile Company (Auburn, Indiana)
- Autocar Company (Ardmore, Pennsylvania)
- Automobile Exchange and Storage Company (New York, New York)
- Baker Motor Vehicle Company (Cleveland, Ohio)
- Berg Automobile Company (New York, New York)
- Buffalo Electric Carriage Company (Buffalo, New York)
- Cadillac Automobile Company (Detroit, Michigan)
- Central Automobile Company (New York, New York)
- Clodio and Widmayer (New York, New York)
- Columbus Motor Vehicle Company (Columbus, Ohio)
- B. V. Covert and Company (Lockport, New York)
- Crest Manufacturing Company (Cambridge, Massachusetts)
- Daimler Manufacturing Company (Long Island City, New York)
- Duryea Power Company (Reading, Pennsylvania)
- Electric Vehicle Company (Hartford, Connecticut)
- Eisenhuth Horseless Vehicle Company (Middletown, Connecticut)
- Elmore Manufacturing Company (Clyde, Ohio)
- Ford Motor Company (Detroit, Michigan)
- Societe Franco-Americaine d'Automobiles (New York, New York)
- Franklin Automobile Company (Syracuse, New York)
- Fredonia Manufacturing Company (Youngstown, Ohio)
- Grout Brothers (Orange, Massachusetts)
- Haynes-Apperson Company (Kokomo, Indiana)
- Holley Motor Car Company (Bradford, Pennsylvania)
- Thos. B. Jeffery Company (Kenosha, Wisconsin)
- Kirk Manufacturing Company (Toledo, Ohio)
- Knox Automobile Company (Springfield, Massachusetts)
- Locomobile Company of America (Bridgeport, Connecticut)
- National Motor Vehicle Company (Indianapolis, Indiana)
- National Sewing Machine Company (Belvidere, Illinois)
- Northern Manufacturing Company (Detroit, Michigan)
- Olds Motor Works (Detroit, Michigan)
- Packard Motor Car Company (Detroit, Michigan)
- Panhard-Levassor (Paris, France)
- Peerless Motor Car Company (Cleveland, Ohio)
- Phelps Motor Vehicle Company (Stoneham, Massachusetts)
- George N. Pierce Company (Buffalo, New York)
- Pope-Robinson Company (Hyde Park, Massachusetts)
- Pope-Toledo Company (Toledo, Ohio)
- Pope-Waverly Company (Indianapolis, Indiana)
- Premier Motor Manufacturing Company (Indianapolis, Indiana)
- Renault (New York, New York)
- Rochet-Schneider (New York, New York)
- Royal Motor Car Company (Cleveland, Ohio)
- Sandusky Automobile Company (Sandusky, Ohio)
- K. A. Skinner (Boston, Massachusetts)
- Smith and Mabley (New York, New York)
- St. Louis Motor Carriage Company (St. Louis, Missouri)
- Standard Automobile Company of New York (New York, New York)
- Stanley Motor Carriage Company (Newton, Massachusetts)
- F. B. Stearns Company (Cleveland, Ohio)
- J. Stevens Arms and Tool Company (Chicopee Falls, Massachusetts)
- Studebaker Brothers Company (South Bend, Indiana)
- E. R. Thomas Motor Company (Buffalo, New York)
- Waltham Manufacturing Company (Waltham, Massachusetts)
- White Sewing Machine Company (Cleveland, Ohio)
- Wilson Automobile Manufacturing Company (Wilson, New York)
- Winton Motor Carriage Company (Cleveland, Ohio)
- Woods Motor Vehicle Company (Chicago, Illinois)

=== Fred H. Colvin's list as of 1917 ===
Fred H. Colvin, who covered the American automotive industry for many years as a journalist and editor of trade journals, wrote in his memoir (1947) about his experiences:

I have already indicated how the early "craze" for horseless carriages caused automobile plants to spring up like mushroom growths all over the country, just as hundreds of locomotive plants had sprung up in the early days of railroading. In both instances, however, the great majority faded out of the picture once the industry had become firmly established. As late as 1917, there were 127 different makes of American automobiles on the market, as compared with little more than a dozen in 1947 [i.e. at the time of this writing]. For the sake of the completeness of the present record, and in order to aid future scholars and research workers, I should like to give the list of American automobiles current thirty years ago [i.e., 1917]:

Abbott-Detroit, Allen, American-Six, Anderson, Apperson, Arbenz, Auburn, Austin, Bell, Biddle, Brewster, Bour-Davis, Briscoe, Buick, Cadillac, Cameron, Case, Chalmers, Chandler, Chevrolet, Cole, Crow-Elkhart, Daniels, Davis, Detroiter, Dispatch, Dixie Flyer, Doble, Dodge, Dorris, Dort, Drexel, Elcar, Elgin, Emerson, Empire, Enger, Fiat, Ford, Fostoria, Franklin, F.R.P., Glide, Grant, Hackett, H.A.L., Halladay, Harroun, Harvard, Haynes, Hollier, Hudson, Hupmobile, Inter-State, Jackson, Jeffery, Jordan, King, Kissel, Kline, Laurel, Lenox, Lexington, Liberty, Locomobile, Lozier, Luverne, Madison, Maibohm, Majestic, Marion-Handley, Marmon, Maxwell, McFarlan, Mecca, Mercer, Metz, Mitchell, Moline-Knight, Monarch, Monitor, Monroe, Moon, Morse, Murray, National, Nelson, Oakland, Oldsmobile, Owen, Packard, Paige, Partin-Palmer, Paterson, Pathfinder, Peerless, Pierce-Arrow, Pilot, Premier, Princess, Pullman, Regal, Republic, Reo, Richmond, Roamer, Ross, Saxon, Scripps-Booth, Spaulding, Simplex, Singer, Standard, Stanley Steamer, Stearns-Knight, Stephens, Stewart, Studebaker, Stutz, Sun, Velie, Westcott, White, Willys-Knight, Winton, and Yale.

A great many more names, including Brush, Duryea, Alco, Speedwell, and Waverly, had already disappeared from the scene by 1917.

=== Other North American makes ===
- Alter (Plymouth, Michigan)
- American Locomotive Company (Schenectady, New York)
- Arrow (Dayton, Ohio)
- Brockville-Atlas (Brockville, Ontario)
- Cino (Cincinnati, Ohio)
- Colburn (Denver, Colorado)
- Hamilton Motors Company (Plymouth, Michigan)
- James Cunningham, Son & Company (Rochester, New York)
- K-R-I-T Motor Car Company (Detroit, Michigan)
- Lambert (Anderson, Indiana)
- Marathon (Nashville, Tennessee)
- Maritime Six (Saint John, New Brunswick)
- McLaughlin (Oshawa, Ontario)
- Model (Peru, Indiana)
- Overland (Toledo, Ohio)
- Stoddard-Dayton (Dayton, Ohio)
- Tincher (Chicago, Illinois)
- Union (Union City, Ohio)

== See also ==
- Antique car
- Steam car
- Classic car
- Cyclecar
- History of the automobile
- Most expensive cars sold in auction
- Vintage car

== Bibliography ==
- Colvin, Fred H. (1947), Sixty Years with Men and Machines, New York and London: McGraw-Hill, LCCN 47003762. Available as a reprint from Lindsay Publications (ISBN 978-0-917914-86-7). Foreword by Ralph Flanders.
- Csere, Csaba (January 1988), "10 Best Engineering Breakthroughs", Car and Driver, vol. 33, no. 7.
- Georgano, G.N. (1985), Cars, 1886–1930, New York: Beekman House, distributed by Crown, ISBN 0-517-48073-5.
