= Taunton (automobile) =

Car brand (1901–1905)

- Industry: Automobiles, gasoline engines
- Founded: 1901
- Defunct: 1905
- Fate: Taunton Automobile Company bankrupt, production resumed by Taunton Motor Carriage Company. Car production ceased in 1905 to make engines.
- Successor: Taunton Motor Manufacturing Company
- Headquarters: Taunton, Massachusetts
- Key people: Everett Cameron
- Products: Automobiles; boats; engines

The Taunton was a brand of steam and gasoline powered automobiles produced in Taunton, Massachusetts by two companies between 1901 and 1905.

== History ==
In around September 1901, the Taunton Automobile Company was formed, and incorporated under the laws of Maine with a capitalization of $200,000. Daniel L. Brownell served as president, Charles B. Edwards was vice president, and Everett S. Cameron served as manager. Cameron formed a car company of his own name in 1902 and would presumably leave before then. Initially, the company planned to manufacture steam cars under the Cameron name, but, shortly after the company was formed, it manufactured cars under the Taunton name instead. The factory was located at 28 Court Street.

By early 1903, the firm was insolvent and its assets were sold in a sheriff's sale. E. W. Lamb purchased the stock and machinery for $787.

It is unclear if Taunton Motor Carriage Company was a direct successor company, but, by 1904, in the same factory a gasoline car with very similar lines was sold under the Taunton brand.

In 1905, Taunton Motor Carriage Company moved its headquarters to 31 Trenton and discontinued automobile production to focus on gasoline engine production for boats, motorcycles, and cars. The firm reorganized during this time and be called the Taunton Motor Manufacturing Company.

== Models ==
=== Taunton steam car ===
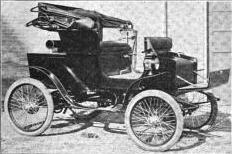
Taunton Steam Carriage

The Taunton steam car was a fairly standard car for its time, it was introduced to the public in late 1901 or early 1902, it seated two or four people depending if the front seat was folded open or closed. The front seat, when not in use, could be used for luggage. The engine was a three-cylinder steam engine fueled by kerosene. Water capacity was 40 gallons, fuel was 20 gallons, and oil 1 gallon. Total weight was 1200 pounds.

=== Taunton gasoline car ===
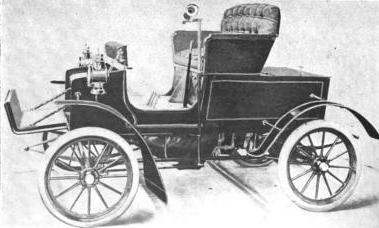
Taunton Gasoline Car

The Taunton gasoline car was remarkably similar in appearance to the Taunton steam carriage, and possibly used the exact same body. It shared the same four seat-two seat configuration. The largest visual difference was wooden wheels versus wire wheels from the steam car. Power would come from a single cylinder water cooled gasoline engine making 7 horsepower. The engine was described as the "De Dion" type. The transmission was a three speed planetary. Max speed was 22 miles per hour. Fuel capacity was 7 gallons and a top was available for an extra cost. Total weight was 1200 pounds. The wheelbase was 68 inches, and the price was $800.

=== Steam boat ===
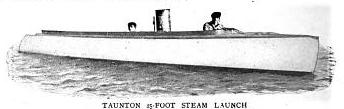
Taunton Boat

In 1902 a steam boat with a speed of 15 miles an hour was shown. The boat waas designed by E. B. Edwards of the Boston Tow Boat Company. Power came from a Taunton three cylinder steam engine with all three cylinders sharing a common crank. Total length was over 24 feet.
