= International Automobile Construction Company =

Defunct American motor vehicle manufacturer

International Automobile Construction Company was a veteran era American automobile company.

== History ==
Founded in Portland, Maine, in early 1900, International's officers were R. M. Gray, W. H. Ricker, C. E. Fay and H. L. Cram.

Like many early American automobile companies, it is doubtful International actually built any cars.

== Sources ==
- Kimes, Beverly Rae. The Standard Catalog of American Cars, 1805-1942. Iola, Wisconsin: Krause Publications, 1989. ISBN 0-87341-111-0.
