= International Automobile League =

Defunct American motor vehicle manufacturer

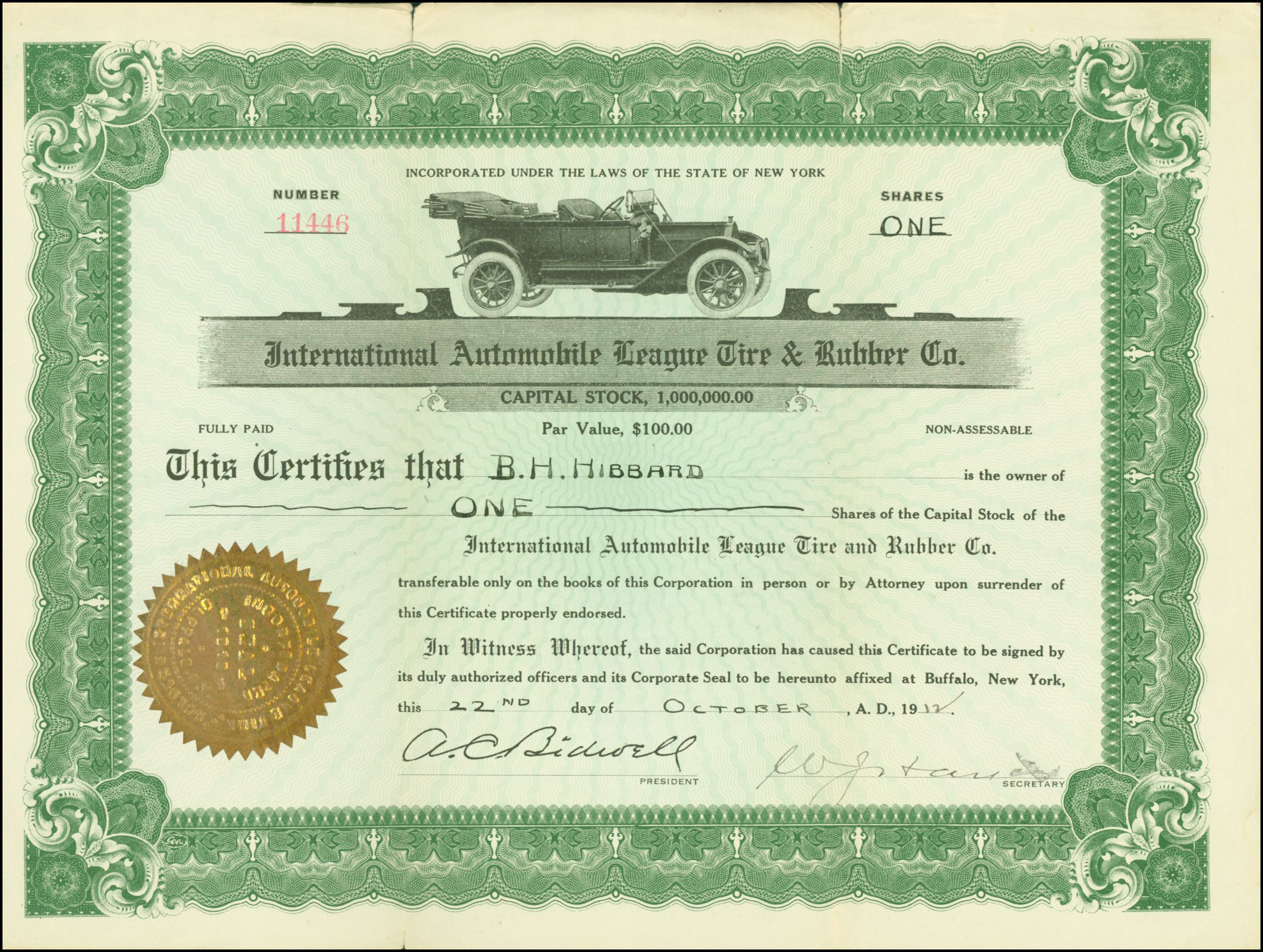
Share of the International Automobile League Tire & Rubber Co., issued 22. October 1912

International Automobile League was a brass era American automobile company.

== History ==
Founded in Buffalo, New York in summer 1908, International's officers were A. C. Bidwell and C. H. Bowe.

In summer 1910, it was reorganized as the International Automobile League Tire and Rubber Company, capitalized at one million dollars, again by Bidwell and Bowe. Like many early American automobile companies, it is doubtful International actually built any cars.

== Sources ==
- Kimes, Beverly Rae. The Standard Catalog of American Cars, 1805-1942. Iola, Wisconsin: Krause Publications, 1989. ISBN 0-87341-111-0.
