= Bay State Automobile Co. =

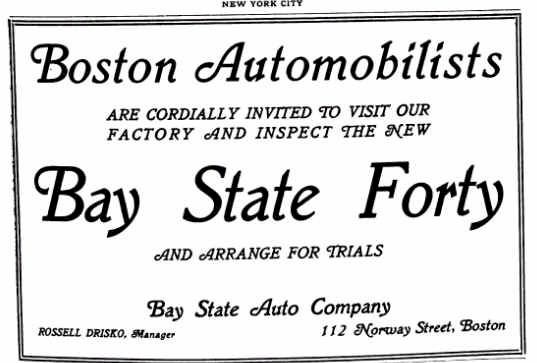
1906 Bay State advertisement

The Bay State Automobile Company was a Brass Era automobile manufacturer based in Boston, Massachusetts. It was founded by Rossell Drisko and Frederick E. Randall in 1906, and lasted to 1908.

It produced a touring car, the Bay State Forty.
