= Colburn Automobile Company =

Defunct American motor vehicle manufacturer

- Industry: Automobile Manufacturing
- Founded: 1906
- Founder: Judge E.A. Colburn
- Defunct: 1911
- Headquarters: Denver, Colorado
- Key people: E.A. Colburn, E.A. Colburn Jr., H.C. Colburn

The Driver is H. C. Colburn, to his left is Judge E.A. Colburn. Notice the Colburn Logo in the window.

The Colburn Automobile Company was a Brass Era car manufacturer in Denver, Colorado. The company produced cars from 1906-1911. in their factory at 15th Street and Colfax Avenue.

Colburns were built as a roadster, and later as a touring car (Model 35). They were fashioned after the French Renault with the radiator positioned behind the sloping hood. The Model 30 and Model 40 roadsters were fast with a top speed of 72 miles per hour and often competed in road races and track events around the Denver area. The roadster featured a 4-cylinder, 40HP engine and 4 speed transmission and sold for $4,500.00. A large shiny brass "C" emblazoned the front of the automobiles.

== The Colburn Family ==
Herbert C. Colburn and Ernest A. Colburn Jr. were the sons of Judge Ernest A. Colburn (E.A. Colburn). Judge Ernest was wealthy, having made his fortune as a mine owner in the Cripple Creek, Colorado mining district. He was the financial backer of the automobile while the car itself was designed and built by his sons.

Herbert and Ernest Jr. were inventors and had interests in engineering and technology, and held at least two patents for the design of mining machinery. At one time, the brothers ran the Ajax Mine in Victor, one of the many mines owned by their father.

== See also ==
- Brass Era car
- History of the automobile
- List of defunct United States automobile manufacturers
