= Crestmobile =

Defunct American motor vehicle manufacturer

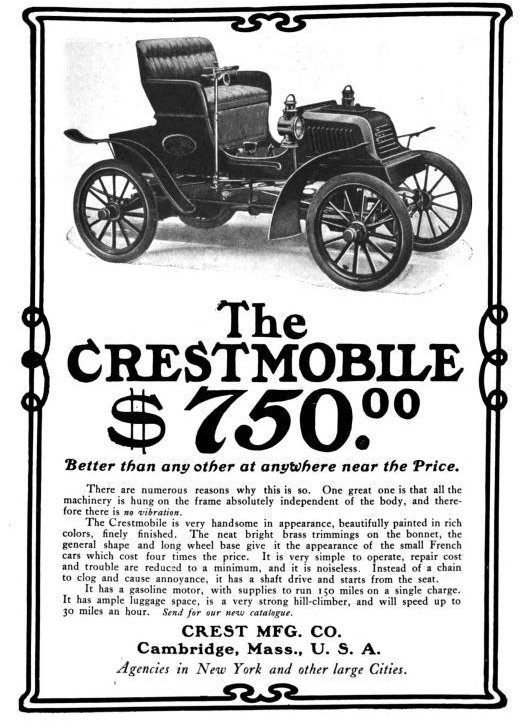
1903 Crestmobile Advertisement

Crest Manufacturing Company was a manufacturer of automobiles in Cambridge, Massachusetts. They built cars between 1901 and 1904.

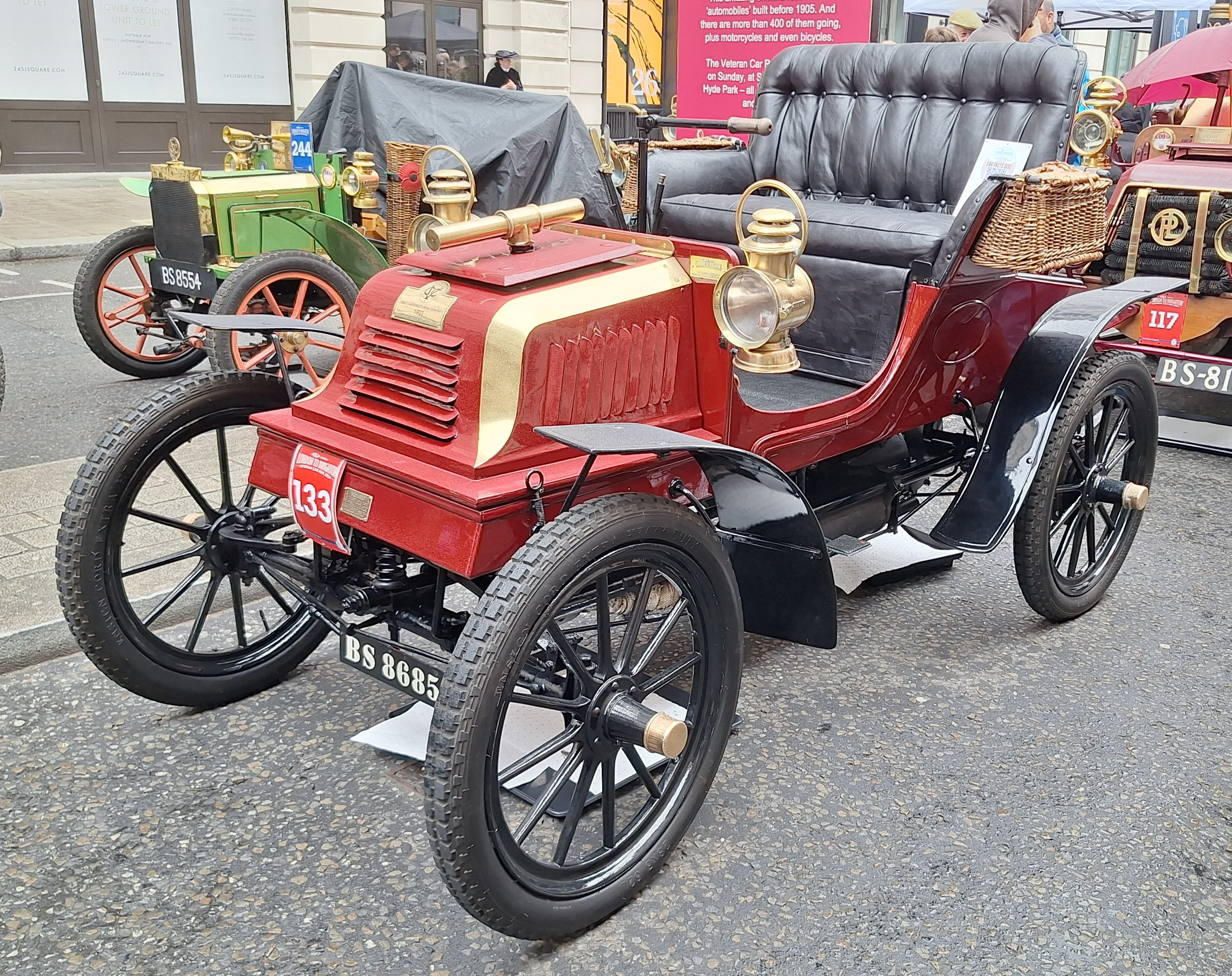
1903 Crestmobile, St James Motoring Spectacle, London 2024

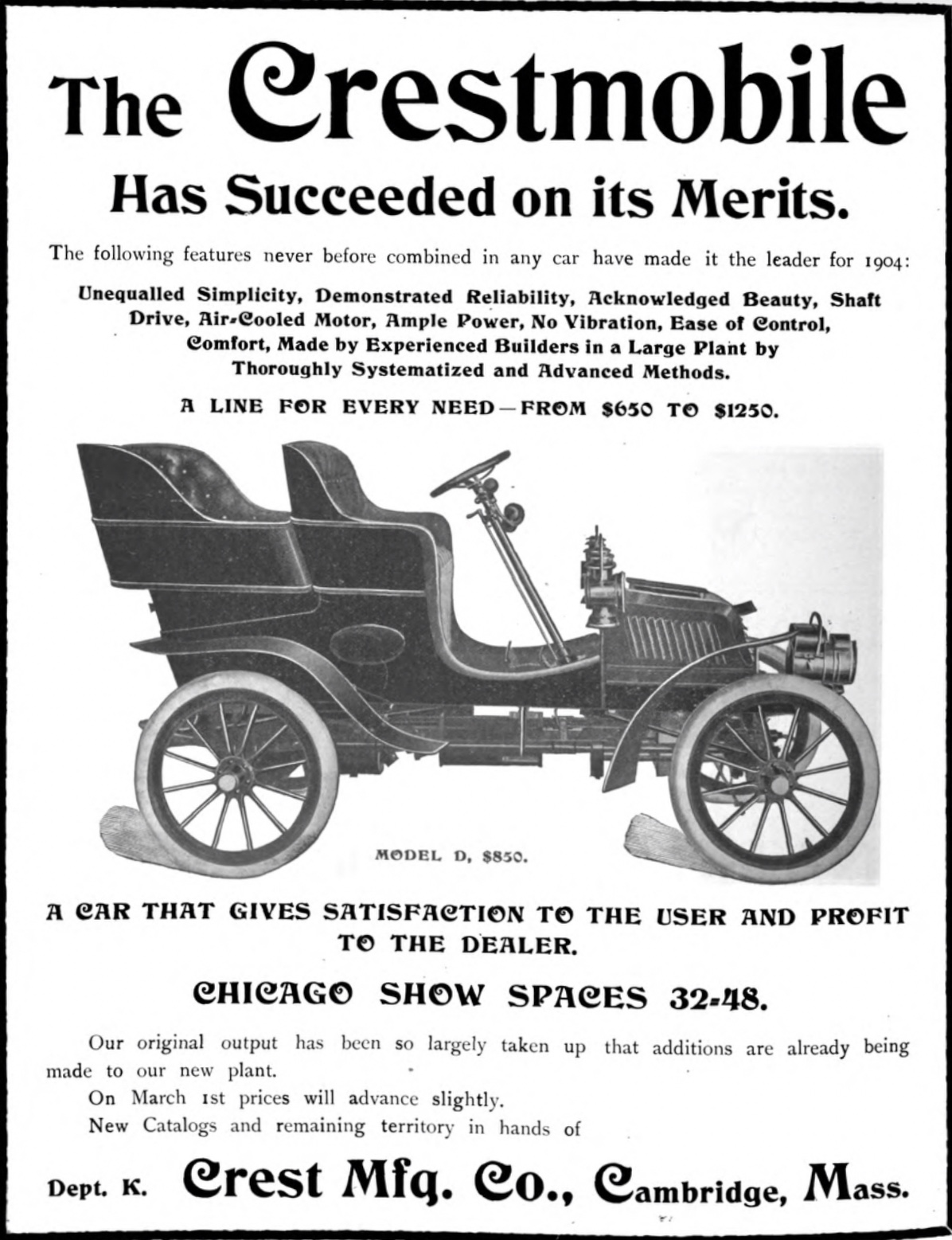
1904 Crestmobile Model D Advertisement

The 1904 Crestmobile was a touring car model, notable for its removable tonneau. With the tonneau in place, it could seat 4 passengers and sold for US$850. The vertical-mounted single-cylinder engine, situated at the front of the car, produced 7 hp (5.2 kW). A two-speed sliding transmission was fitted. The tubular-framed car weighed 930 lb (422 kg). It was similar in construction to the contemporary Covert.

== Production models ==
- Crestmobile D

== See also ==
- List of defunct United States automobile manufacturers
