= Austin Automobile Company =

Defunct American motor vehicle manufacturer

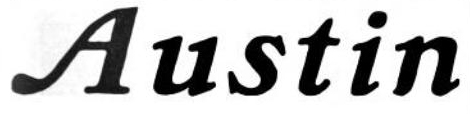
- Type: Automobile Manufacturing
- Industry: Automotive
- Genre: Touring cars
- Founded: 1901; 125 years ago
- Founder: James E. Austin and his son Walter Austin
- Defunct: 1921; 105 years ago
- Headquarters: Grand Rapids, Michigan, United States
- Area served: United States
- Products: Vehicles; Automotive parts

The Austin was a brass era American automobile manufactured in Grand Rapids, Michigan from 1901 to 1921. The company, founded by James E. Austin and his son Walter Austin, built large, expensive and powerful touring cars with an unusual double cantilever rear spring arrangement placing the rear wheels behind (sometimes well behind) the passenger compartment, for a longer wheelbase to improve rider comfort in an era of rough roads as well as a unique two-speed rear axle.

== History ==
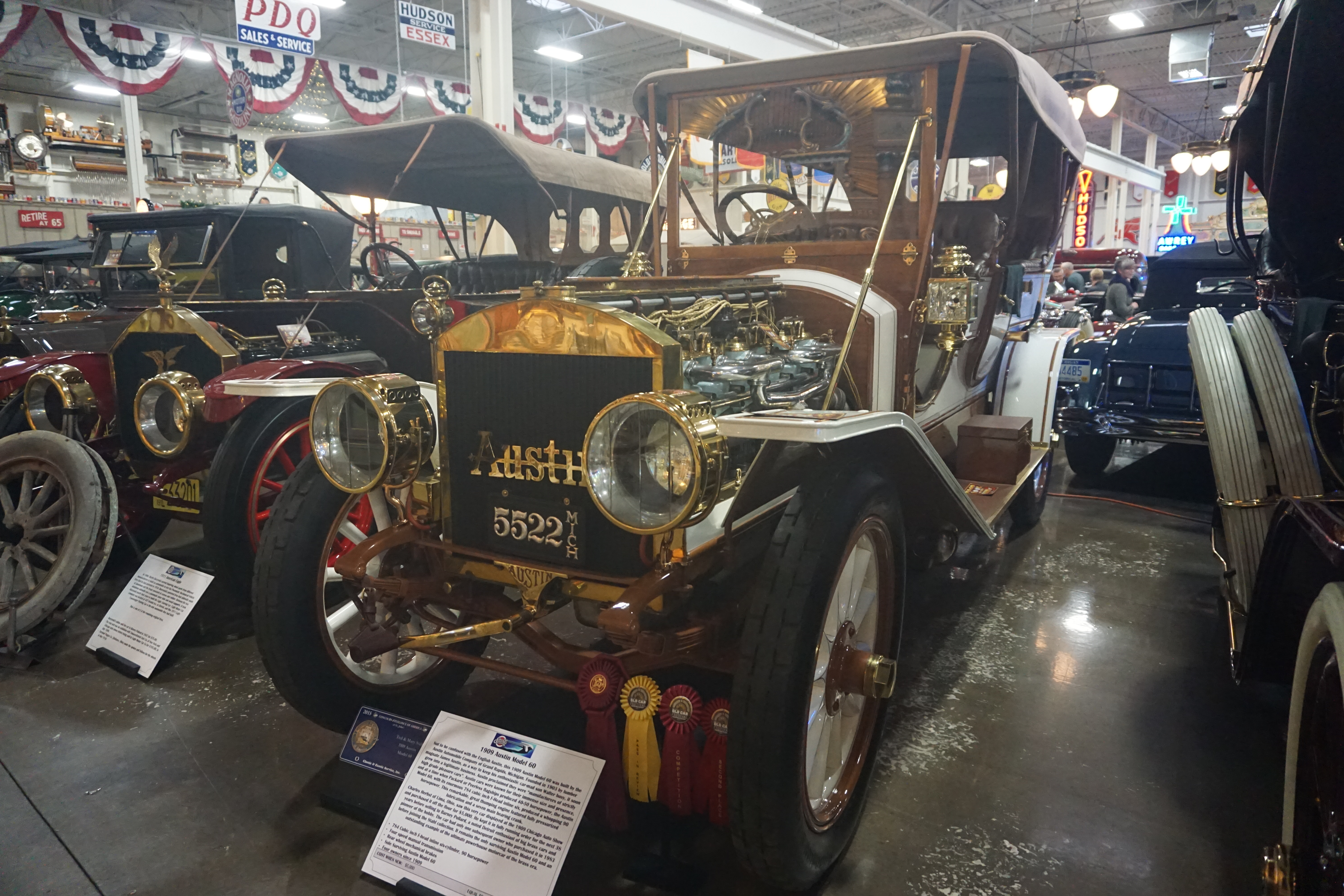
1909 Austin Model 60 at Stahls Automotive Collection

Austin Model XVI, XXV, XXXV, L advertisement (1904)

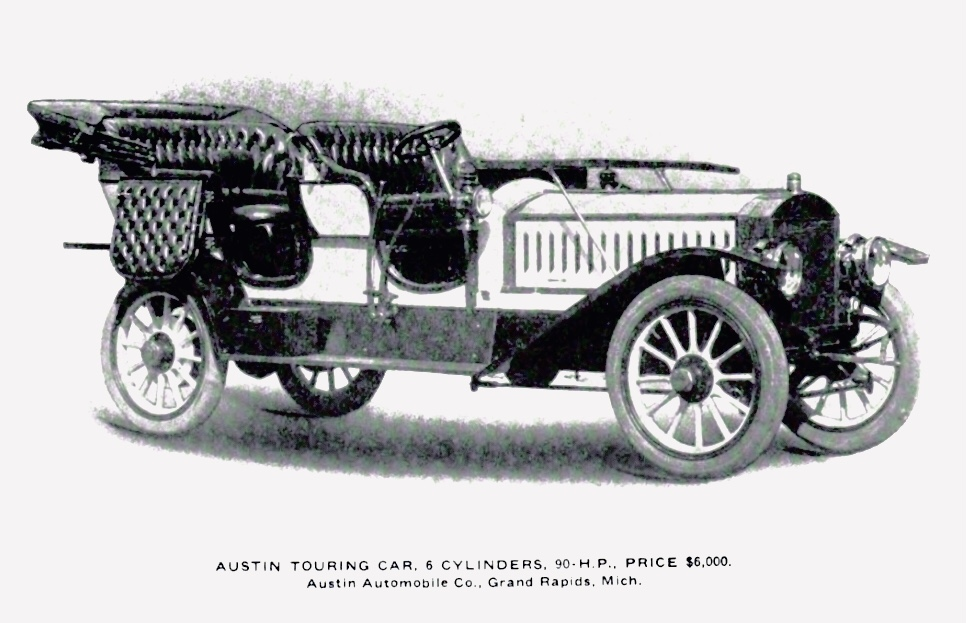
Austin Model XC (1908)

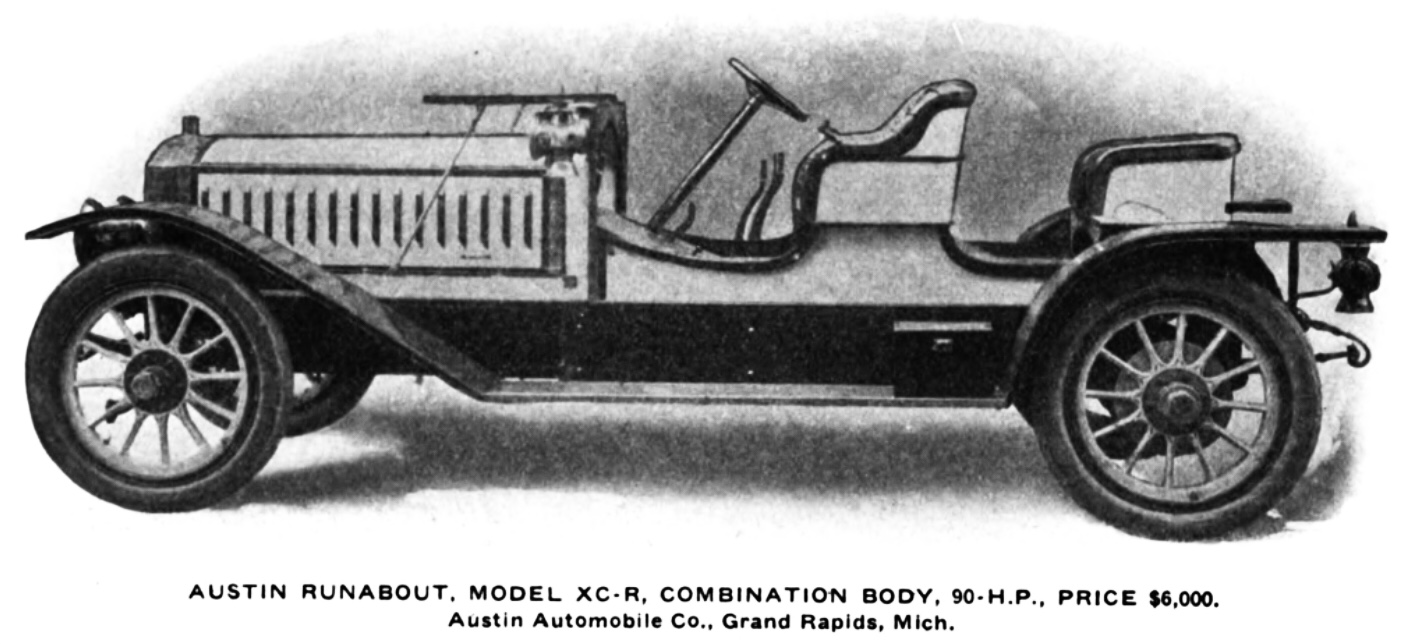
Austin Model XC-R (1908)

The first car, introduced in 1902, was a two-cylinder model with the 16 hp engine under the seat driving the rear wheels through an epicyclic gearbox and chains. It was considerably larger than most other makes of the day. For several years, colors were optional, but most were painted either white with tan trim or light brown. After about 10 were sold they moved to larger engines and shaft drive. Four cylinder models followed in 1904 rated at 35 or 50 hp.

The 1907 60hp (45 kW) LX model was an eight-seat tourer.

The Model XC in 1908 was a 90 hp (67 kW) 13-litre six and described as the "sportiest kind of car it is possible to get", by Walter S. Austin. Depending on coachwork it could cost up to $7000. The car's wheelbase was extremely large at 147 in (3,700 mm). By 1911, the vehicles were equipped with electric lights and left-hand steering and in 1913 two speed rear axles were introduced.

The four cylinder models were dropped after 1908 and for 1915, a six with 572in^{3} (9383 cc) (4½×6 inches, 114×152 mm) engine was available in a three-passenger tourer or touring roadster. The name "Highway King" was adopted in 1916.

In 1917 the company offered a V-12 model of the "Highway King", which was made up until production operations ceased in 1920, due to the postwar recession.

Production was never high, running at about 30 cars a year and in total about 1,000 cars were made. After the company closed the Austins moved into the real estate business.

== Advertisements ==
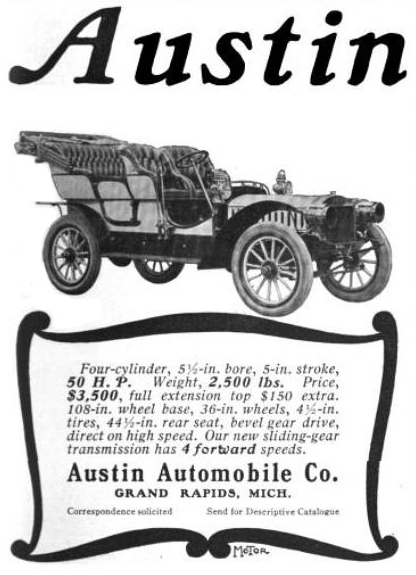
Austin Automobile Company of Grand Rapids, Michigan - 1905 model

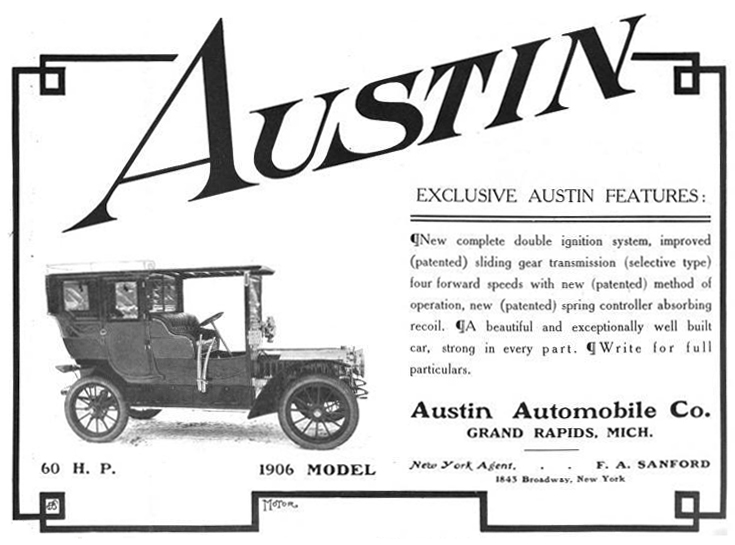
Austin Automobile Company - 1906 model

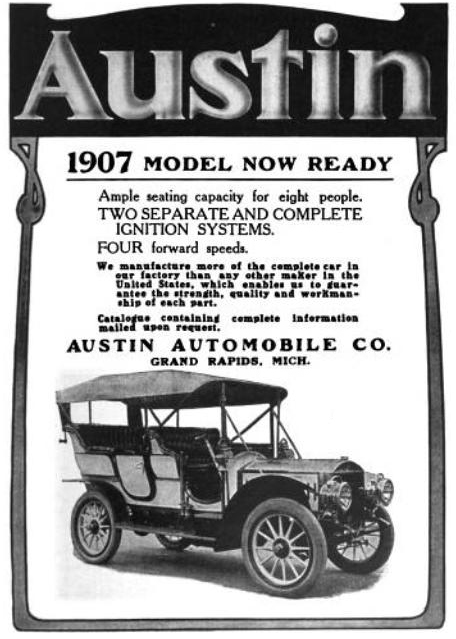
Austin Automobile Company of Grand Rapids, Michigan - 1907 model

== Sources ==
- Clymer, Floyd. Treasury of Early American Automobiles, 1877-1925. New York: Bonanza Books, 1950.
