= Harvard (automobile) =

Defunct American motor vehicle manufacturer

The Harvard was a Brass Era car built in Troy and Hudson Falls, New York and later in Hyattsville, Maryland over the course of the period 1915 to 1921.

After selling his Herreshoff Motor Company in Detroit, Charles Herreshoff teamed up with Northrup R. Holmes, who had already founded the Herreshoff Light Car Company as a Troy dealership for the previous Herreshoff car. Herreshoff brought with him the prototype for his new light car that he had been working on while still in Detroit. Plans were laid for production in Troy, with an eye on the export market (especially New Zealand). Herreshoff abruptly departed town for South America, taking his prototype with him. Holmes then approached Theodore Litchfield to be business partners, as Holmes still had the plans for the car in his office safe. Litchfield was a Troy mechanic and the dealer for the Herff-Brooks automobile. Holmes and Litchfield formed a new company, the Pioneer Motor Car Company to manufacture the newly christened Harvard auto. The company name was quickly changed to the Harvard-Pioneer Motor Car Company.

The Model 4-20 featured a small four-cylinder Model engine, and was one of the first in the U.S. with a covered compartment for concealing the spare tire. Another distinguishing feature of the Harvard was that the headlights were attached to mounts directly bolted to the radiator shell. In early 1916, Holmes partnered with local auto dealer George N. Nay to use the latter's facilities in neighbouring Hudson Falls. Assembly of the Harvard now took place on the top floor of the Adirondack Motor Car Company, of which Nay was the owner.

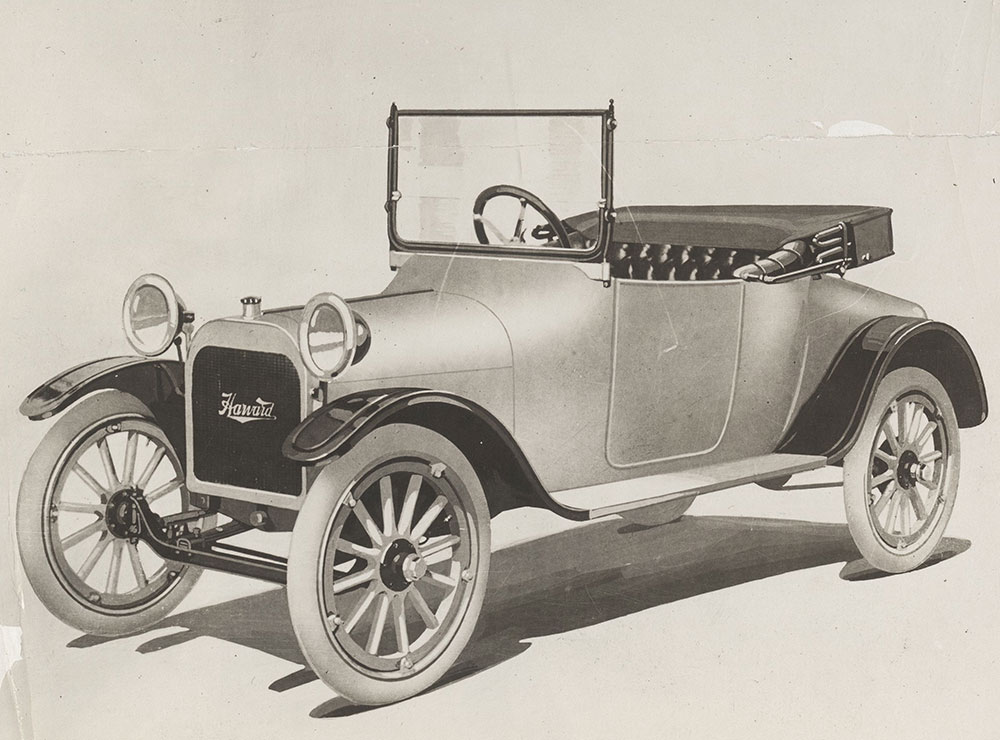
1917 Harvard Model 4-20 roadster

The plant supervisor was one Walter Bulow, previously of Lozier and American Fiat. Bulow redesigned the Harvard in 1919, giving it a more rounded radiator shell. In October 1919, the company name was once again changed, this time to the Harvard Motor Car Company. Not long after the name change, a group of businessmen which included Henry R. Carroll of Washington, C.C., bought the entire operation and transferred it to Hyattsville, Maryland. Several of the Bulow-designed automobiles were built in Maryland, before the company finally succumbed to the depression of the early 1920s.
