= Ross (gasoline automobile) =

Defunct American motor vehicle manufacturer

Ross Automobile Company
- Industry: Automotive
- Founded: 1915; 111 years ago
- Founder: John L. Ross
- Defunct: 1918; 108 years ago
- Fate: Bankruptcy
- Headquarters: Detroit, Michigan, United States
- Products: Automobiles

The Ross was a Brass era automobile manufactured in Detroit, Michigan from 1915 to 1918 by the Ross Automobile Company.

== History ==
John L. Ross of Ross & Young Machine Company entered the automobile field by incorporating his Ross Automobile Company in 1915. The Ross automobile had a Herschell-Spillman V-8 engine with body styles including sedans and town cars and were priced at $1,350 and $1,850, equivalent to $58,877 in 2025.

The "Ross Eight" won fame briefly in 1916 for being the first automobile to climb San Francisco's famous Fillmore Street hill in high gear, where grades reach a maximum of 25 1/2%.

New York capitalists took over the company in late 1916 and changed the car from an 8-cylinder to a Continental six-cylinder. In 1917 the V-8 engine was reinstated, but not for long. The Company entered receivership and in February 1918, the Ross plant had been sold.
