= Cameron (automobile) =

Defunct American motor vehicle manufacturer

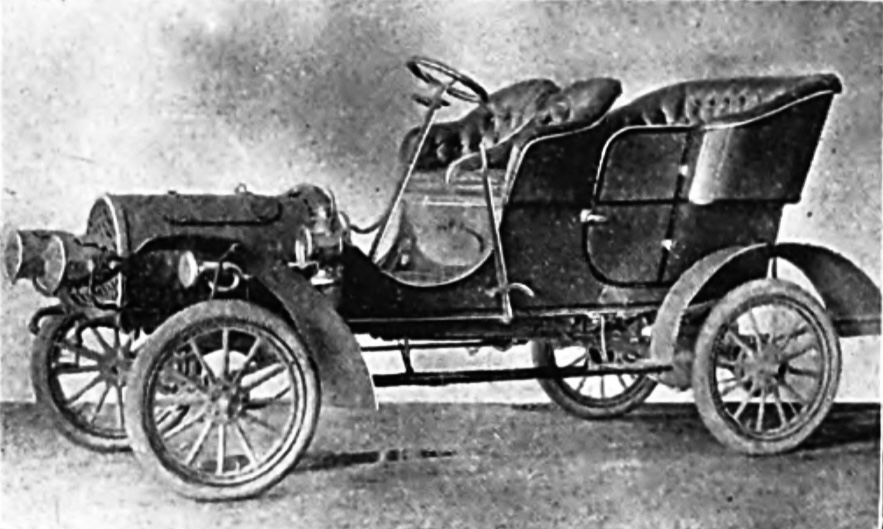
Cameron Model L (12/15HP) 1905

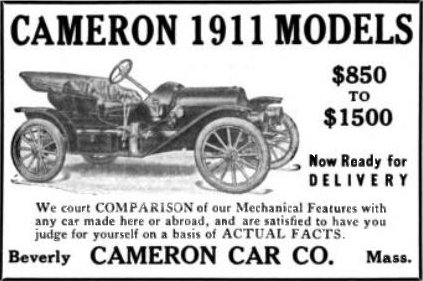
1911 Cameron Advertisement

The Cameron was an American automobile manufactured by the Cameron Car Company of Rhode Island from 1902 to 1906, then in Brockton, Massachusetts, from 1906 to 1908, then in Beverly, Massachusetts, from 1909 to 1915, Norwalk, Connecticut, in 1919, and finally in Stamford, Connecticut, in 1920. No cars were produced from 1915 to 1918. The company made two-, four-, and six-cylinder models. A 1909 Cameron Six phaeton exists in good condition in Washington state in a private collection, and a 1903 Cameron Runabout exists in the Reno Automobile Museum. In addition, a few collectors have spare parts, such as incomplete engines.

== History ==
=== United Motor Corporation (1903-1904) ===
Everett Cameron would begin his automotive career designing steam cars. He would begin work with the Eclipse Automobile Company in Easton Massachusetts, the company would make a small steam runabout, but would fail shortly after in 1903. Before the firm failed however Everett would move on to another New England startup, this time with a company called the Taunton Automobile Company in Taunton Massachusetts. Taunton, like Eclipse, would manufacture a small steam runabout, and also just like Eclipse would fail in just a few years going bankrupt in 1905.

Before Taunton would go out of business Everett would jump ship and with his brother Forrest create a new company to sell an automobile with his own name. In 1902 the United Motor Corporation would be formed to sell the Cameron car.

=== James Brown Machine Company (1904-1905) ===
In November of 1904 it would be announced that the James Brown Machine Company would succeed the United Motor Corporation and continue to build cars under the Cameron brand. The James W. Brown Company was formed in 1829 and was in the business of making textile machinery. For the 1905 selling season the new company hoped to produce 800 cars. For 1905 three distinct models would be offered, a 2 cylinder, three cylinder and four cylinder car.

=== Cameron Car Company (1905- ===
In late 1905 it would be announced that the Cameron Car Company would be incorporated at $200,000 to continue production of the Cameron Car. The plant would be moved from Pawtucket to Norfolk VA. The company headquarters would be placed there too. A new 60x440 foot two story high factory would be planned. This factory would be for storage, wood working, machinery, and offices, while a smaller 50x200 foot factory would contain the boiler house and testing room. The Cameron would assemble almost every aspect of the car minus the tires.

In Mid 1906 the company would announce that they would move, this time to Brockton Massachusetts.

For the 1907 model year a four cylinder 16 horsepower model would be offered for $750. A six cylinder model making 24 horsepower would also be offered between $1400 and $1800.

In July of 1907 Cameron Car Company would incorporate at $100,000. At this time Everett and Forrest were still with the company. It is unclear why this incorporation amount is lower than when the company was founded.

For the 1908 selling season there would be four different body styles on two wheelbases. The models 6,7,8,9 would all use the same air cooled motor and proprietary Cameron transmission. For 1908 the company would again move, this time to Beverly Massachusetts after purchasing a factory that belonged to the Beverly Manufacturing Company.

In 1909 the company would increase their capitalization to $500,000. The four cylinder models would be manufactured in Beverly while the new six cylinder models would be made in made in New London at another factory. Production between September 1909 and July 1910 was estimated to be 5000 cars.

== Models ==
=== Cameron Light Gasoline Car (1903-1903) ===
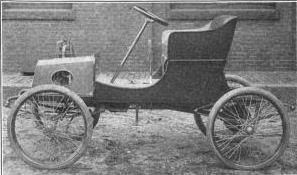
1903 Cameron Light Gasoline Car

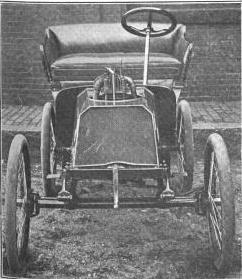
1903 Cameron Light Gasoline Car Front

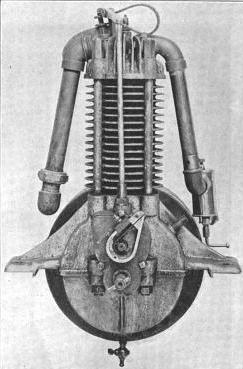
Engine

The first model that would use the Cameron name would be a very unusual 600 pound runabout described in the trade journals as "The Cameron Light Gasoline Car". The model would be a very small with no roof or windshield. The most notable feature of the car would be the air cooled engine sticking out of the hood. The engine would be tiny (around 47 cubic inches) and have an operating rpm of 1,200 and 5 horsepower. A two speed sliding gear transmission was used. Wire wheels would be offered which were 28 inches wide, and the wheelbase was 72 inches. The car was unusual in that it was built for left hand drive when right hand drive was still very common in the United States. Production number are unclear, but parts for 100 cars were ordered in advance of sales. This model would be built in Pawtucket RI.

=== Cameron (1904-1904) ===
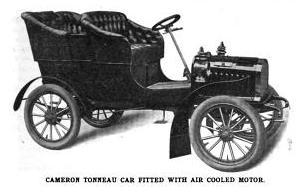
1904 Cameron Tonneau

For 1904 the Cameron would undergo significant changes, the most notable was that the engine was no longer poking out of the hood. Two body styles were available for 1904, a runabout, and a rear entrance tonneau. Prices were $650 for the runabout, and 750 for the tonneau. A top could be bought for an extra $50. The single would again be a single cylinder air cooled motor. The transmission would have two forward speeds and a reverse. The wheels would be made of hickory as opposed to the wire wheels on the earlier model. The gas tank could hold enough fuel for 200 miles. A steering wheel was standard and could tilt to allow people to get in an out of the car easier. The body was made of wood and any color the customer wanted could be applied to the body. The wheelbase was 76 inches. The James Brown Company would make these models.

=== Cameron Model H,I,J,K,L (1905-1905) ===
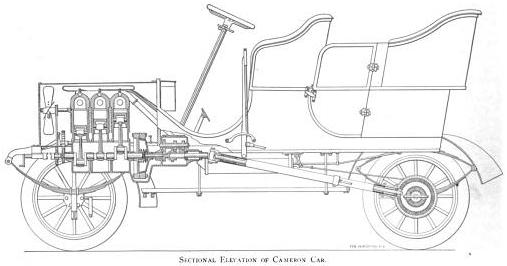
1905 Cameron Model J

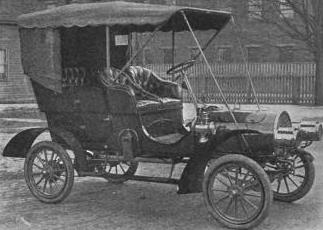
1905 Cameron Model L

In 1905 the lineup would be expanded. The Model H, and Model I would be the entry level models. The Model H would be a runabout body style, and the model I would be a "light tonneau" both of these would be powered by a 8 horsepower 2 cylinder engine. While the Model J would be a "special surrey" and the Model K would be a runabout. The Model J and K were powered by a three cylinder engine making 12 horsepower. All of these cars were evidently very similar as the ads at the time would state "a description of the 12 horse power vehicle will answer reasonably well for the 8 horse power car, as the size of the cylinders and other engine parts are the same and the change speed gear and shaft drive are identical in the two models". What this indicates is that the three cylinder model is a two cylinder model with an extra cylinder added. The engines would be air cooled with ribbing to aid in cooling. Prices would be $675 for the Model H, $775 for the Model I, $1,050 for the Model J, $950 for the Model K, and $1,050 for the Model L.

=== Cameron 2 Passenger Touring Car (1907-1907) ===
In 1906 for the 1907 model year Cameron would introduce a new air cooled four cylinder touring car with seating for two. A novel feature of the car would be from the transmission. The gears would be changed at the differential instead of at the shift lever like many cars of the day. The advantages listed were ease of operation and durability of the unit.

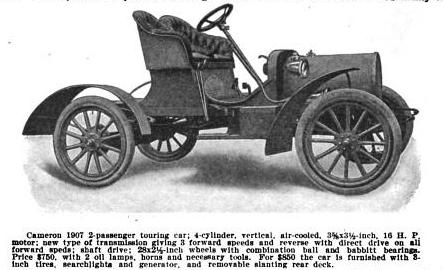
1907 Cameron Two Passenger Touring Car

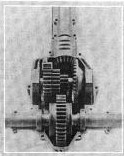
Cameron Transmission

The motor would have a similar appearance to previous models with ribbing on the cylinders and exhaust manifold. The engine would be 16 horsepower at 1000 rpm the throttle and spark were controlled by a lever on the steering wheel, and the top speed was around 45 miles per hour. A touring or commercial car body were available and were interchangeable. The body was white wood on an oak frame. The body was carmine, and the trimmings were red leather; although other colors could be had at not cost, but it would take an extra two weeks to order. Two lights, a horn, and tools were standard. The price was $750, or $850 with acetylene lights instead of oil.

=== Cameron Model 6,7,8,9 (1908-1909) ===
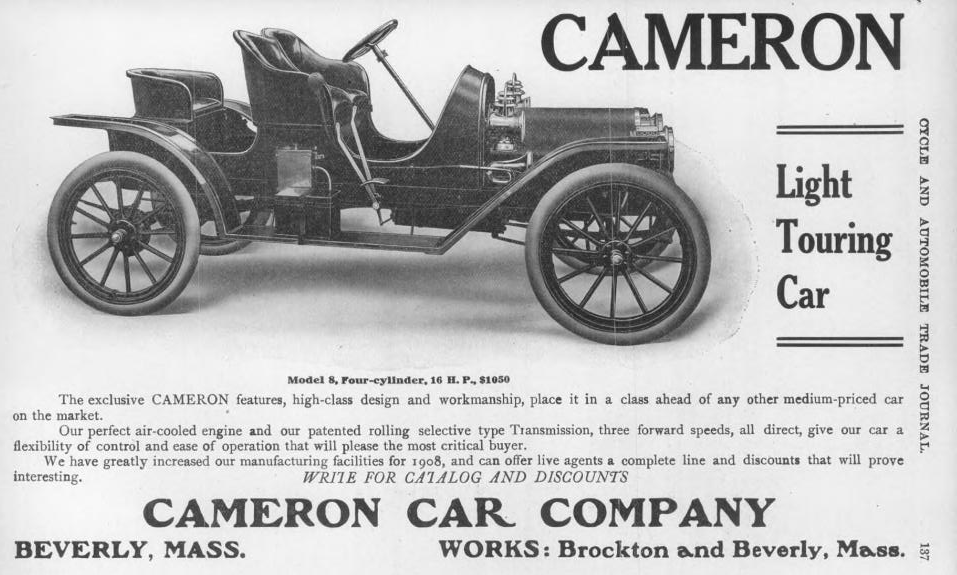
1908 Cameron Model 8

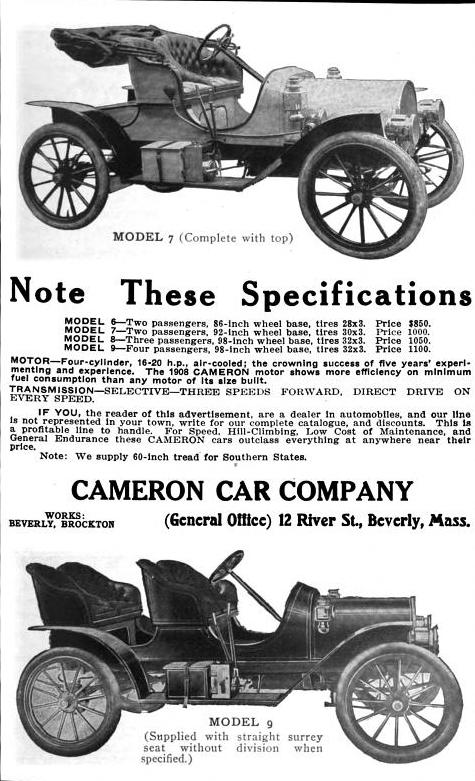
Cameron Model 7 and 9

For the 1908 season Cameron would continue by making a four cylinder air cooled car. The design was similar enough that it was described as "No radical departure" from last year's model. The models would be designations for body styles. The Model 6 was a 2 passenger runabout selling for $850 on an 86 inch wheelbase, the Model 7 was a 2 passenger runabout with a top on a 96 inches wheelbase and sold for $1000. The Model 8 "tourist model" was a three seat runabout (two seats in the front with one in the back) and was on an 96 inch wheelbase and sold for $1050. The model 9 was a four seat touring car and sold for $1100. All of the cars had three forward speeds and around 16 horsepower. It was claimed that the car could obtain 25 miles per gallon and used the Cameron transmission.

=== Cameron Model 11 (1909- ===
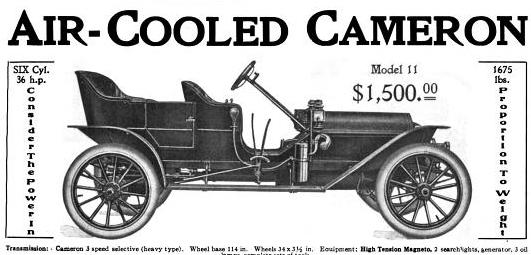
Cameron Model 11 Around 1909

The Cameron Model 11 was a six cylinder car manufactured in New London. It would be sold as a roadster, touring car, and runabout for $1500. The car made 36 horsepower and had a three speed sliding transmission. Weight was 1650 to 1600 pounds depending on body style. All models were equipped with 5 lamps, a horn, tools, and a Remy Magneto.

== See also ==
- Brass Era car
