= Tincher =

Defunct American motor vehicle manufacturer

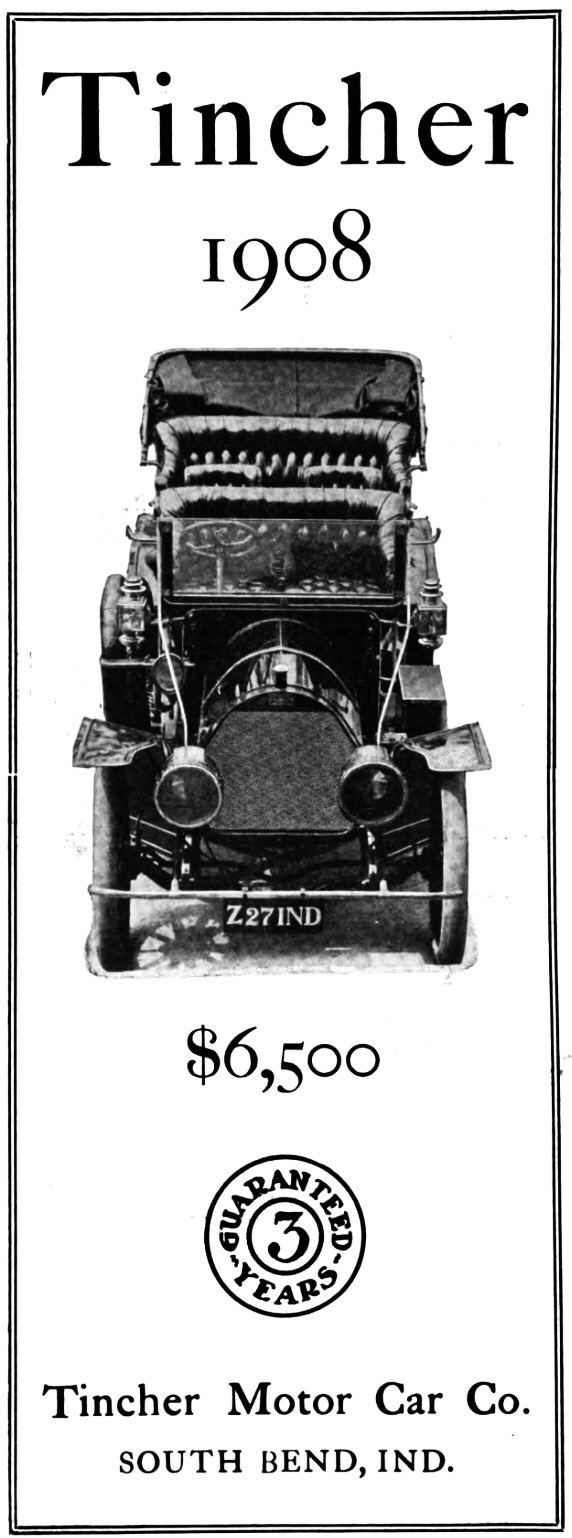
Tincher advertisement (1908)

The Tincher was a brand of automobile produced from 1903–1908 in Chicago, Illinois, and from 1908 to 1909 in South Bend, Indiana. The car was named after its developer, Thomas Luther Tincher, but built by the Chicago Coach and Carriage Company using components and body sections fabricated by the German Krupp steelworks.

The Tincher debuted at the 1903 Chicago Automobile Show, where its air-braking system was the technical wonder of the event. Not only could the air-system stop the car, but it could be used to inflate flat tires and power the car's horn.

The Tincher was also one of the costliest cars in production at the time, with a race version beginning at $12,000. Custom coach work on the touring cars and coach models could raise the price even higher. Small Tinchers, riding on a 90 in (2,300 mm) wheelbase, were priced in the $5,000 - $10,000 range.

In 1907, Tincher moved himself and the newly incorporated Tincher Motor Car Company to South Bend, Indiana, where Studebaker Brothers Manufacturing Company maintained its production facilities. Tincher had hoped that being near the Studebaker brothers (who were majority stock holders in the venture) would help not only development of cars and custom bodies, but sales as well.

However well built the cars were, the Tincher was discontinued in 1909 when Thomas Tincher and his company both declared bankruptcy. Tincher then moved to Los Angeles where he became West Coast distributor of the Haynes automobile.
