= ArBenz =

American automobile manufacturer

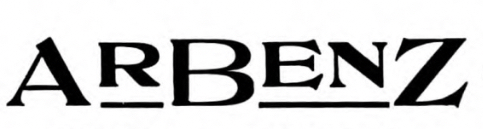
- Type: car Company
- Industry: Manufacturing
- Founded: 1911; 115 years ago
- Founder: Fred C. Arbenz
- Defunct: 1918; 108 years ago
- Headquarters: Chillicothe, Ohio, US
- Products: cars

The ArBenz was an automobile manufactured in Ohio from 1911 until approximately 1918. There is no connection to the Swiss Arbenz Motor Car Factory. Arbenz Motorwagenfabrik (1904–1922)

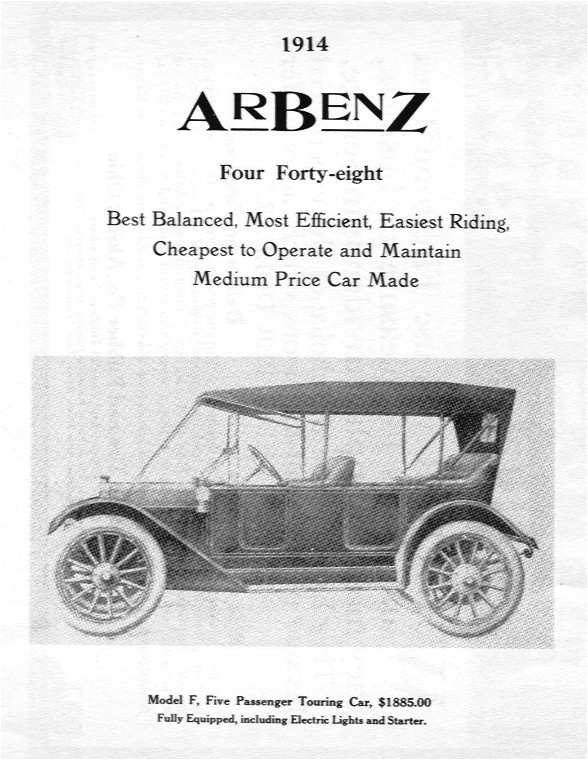
1914 ArBenz 448 advertisement

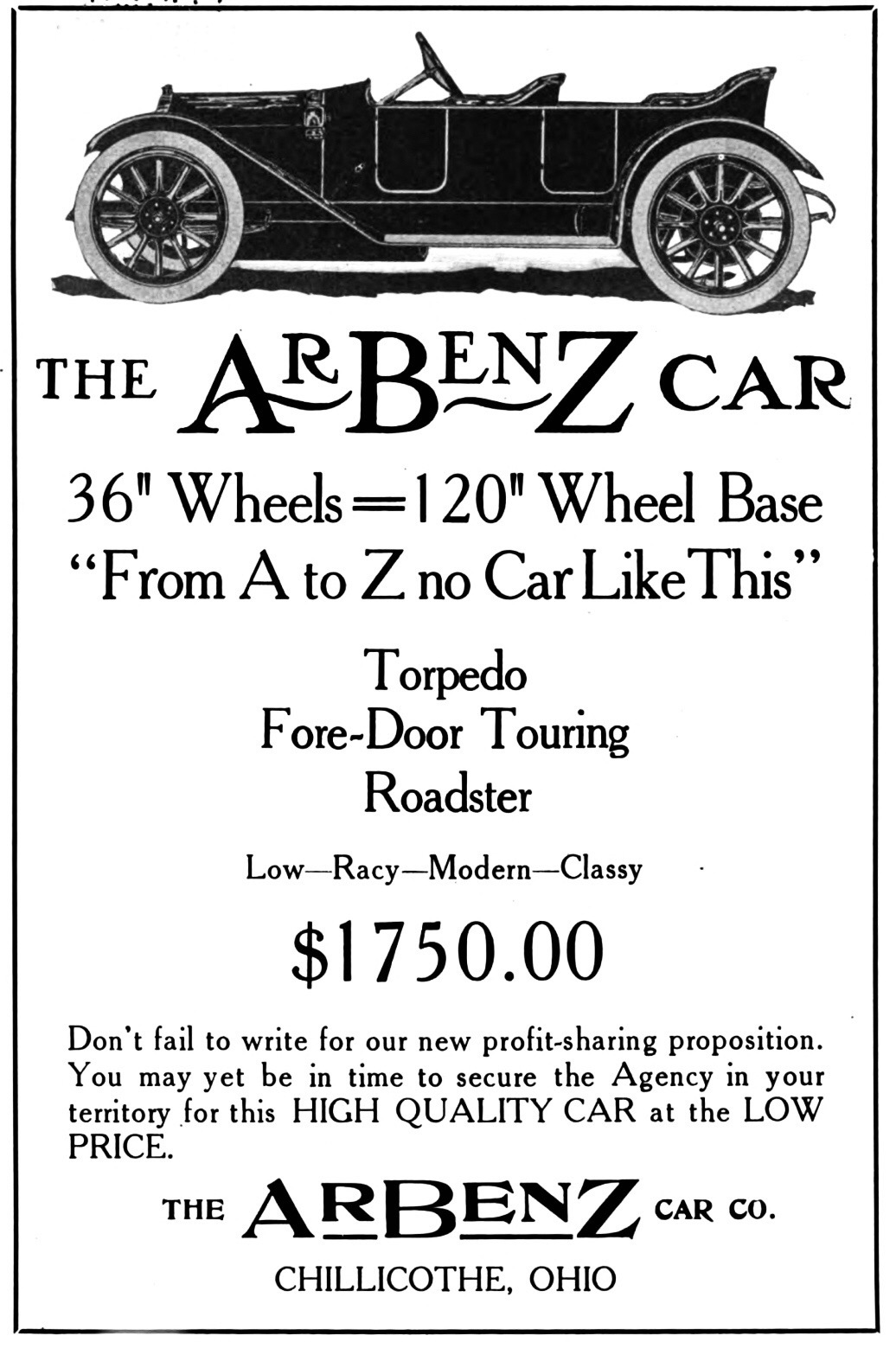
ArBenz Model D (1912-1913)

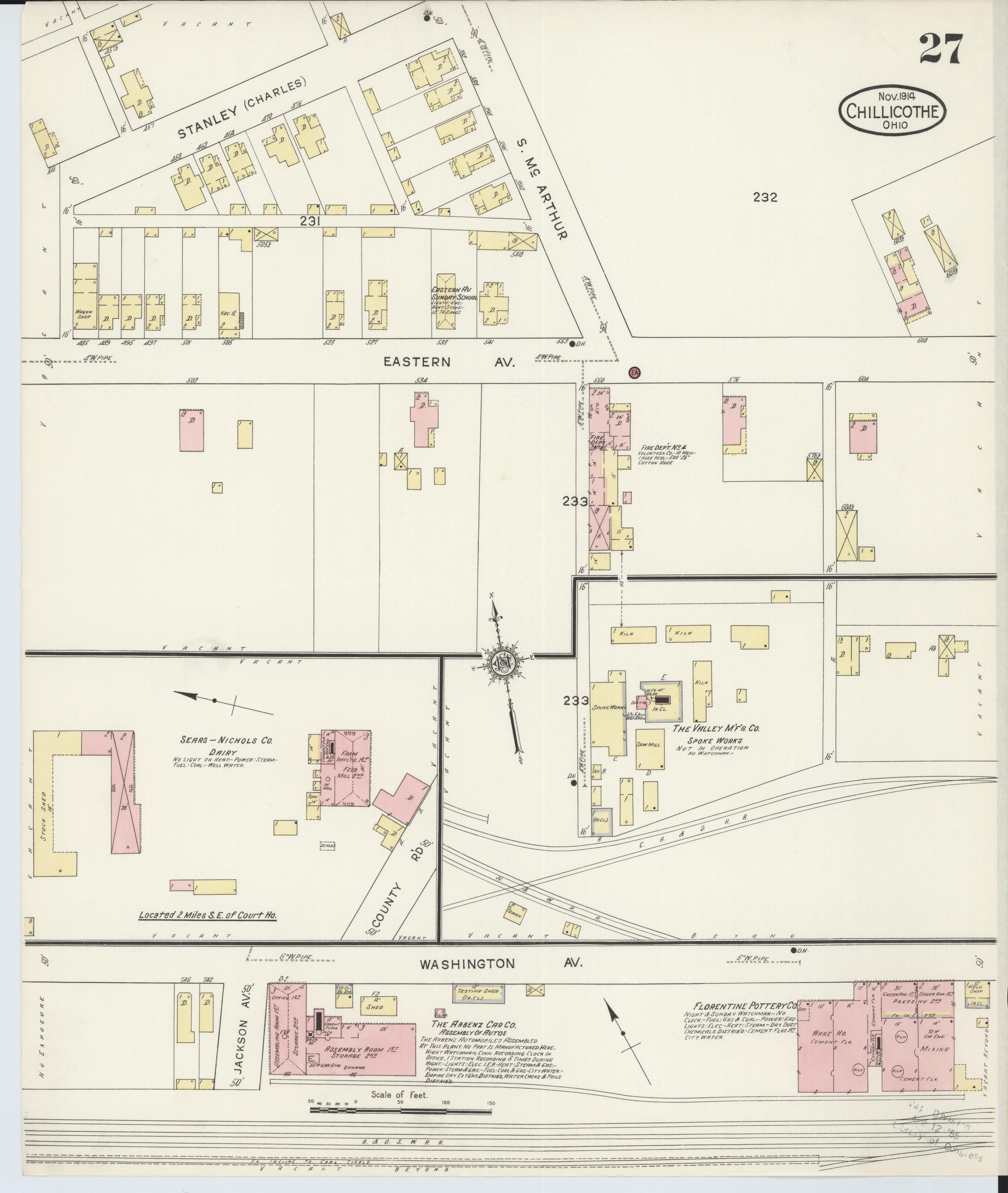
ArBenz Plant (1914)

Fred Arbenz and Nand Arbenz (father and son, respectively) formed the Scioto Car Company in 1911, named for the Scioto River flowing through Chillicothe, Ohio, where the car was made. It was manufactured in the factory of the former family furniture business. The name was changed to ArBenz in 1912. The capitalization was to suggest association with the Blitzen Benz.

Fred was president and Nand was the designer for the company. C.O. Snyder was hired as chief designer shortly thereafter. The cars produced by the company were all four-cylinders and usually in the mid-price category. A variety of touring cars and roadsters were produced. The 1916 model was significantly smaller both in size and price than previous models. In March 1916, ArBenz was taken over by the National United Service Company, which was acquiring automotive brands for yet another attempt to take on General Motors. NUSC announced that it would continue ArBenz production, but by 1918 the only cars assembled were from remaining parts.

== Production models ==
- ArBenz Model A (1911) Runabout & Touring 30-40 HP
- ArBenz Model B (1912-1913) Roadster 30-40 HP
- ArBenz Model C (1912-1913) Torpedo 30-40 HP
- ArBenz Model D (1912-1913) Touring 30-40 HP
- ArBenz Model E (1912-1913) Roadster, Touring, Torpedo 48 HP
- ArBenz Model F also called 448 (1914-1915) Five passenger Touring 48 HP
- ArBenz Model G (1914) Four passenger Torpedo 48 HP
- ArBenz Model H (1914-1915) Roadster 48 HP
- ArBenz Model 25 (1916) Roadster & Touring 25 HP

Year	Production	Model	Serial Numbers
1911		A	
1912		B, C	
1913		B, C	
1914	↓	H, G, F	100 to 155
1915	56	D	100 to 155
1916	↓	25	1000 to 1060
1917	↓	25	1000 to 1060
1918	61	25	1000 to 1060
