= Bell Motor Car Company =

Defunct American motor vehicle manufacturer

Bell Motor Cars Company
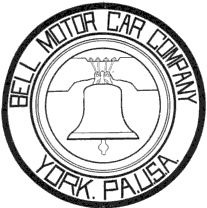
- Founded: 1915
- Defunct: 1922
- Headquarters: York, Pennsylvania (USA)
- Products: Cars

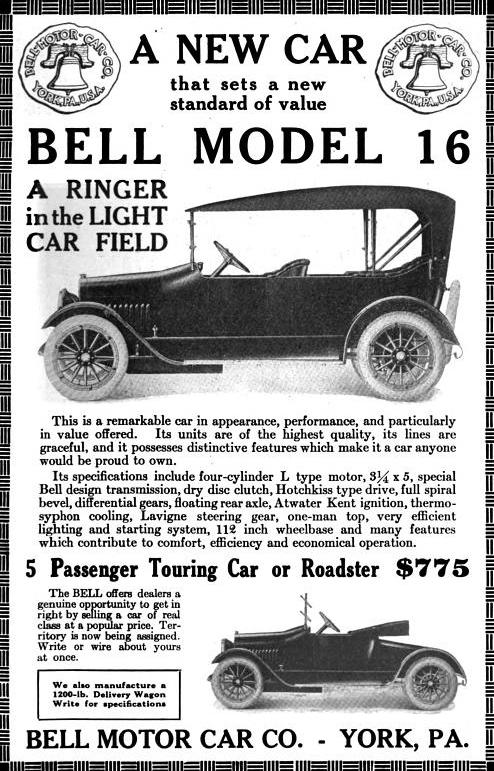
1915 Bell Model 16

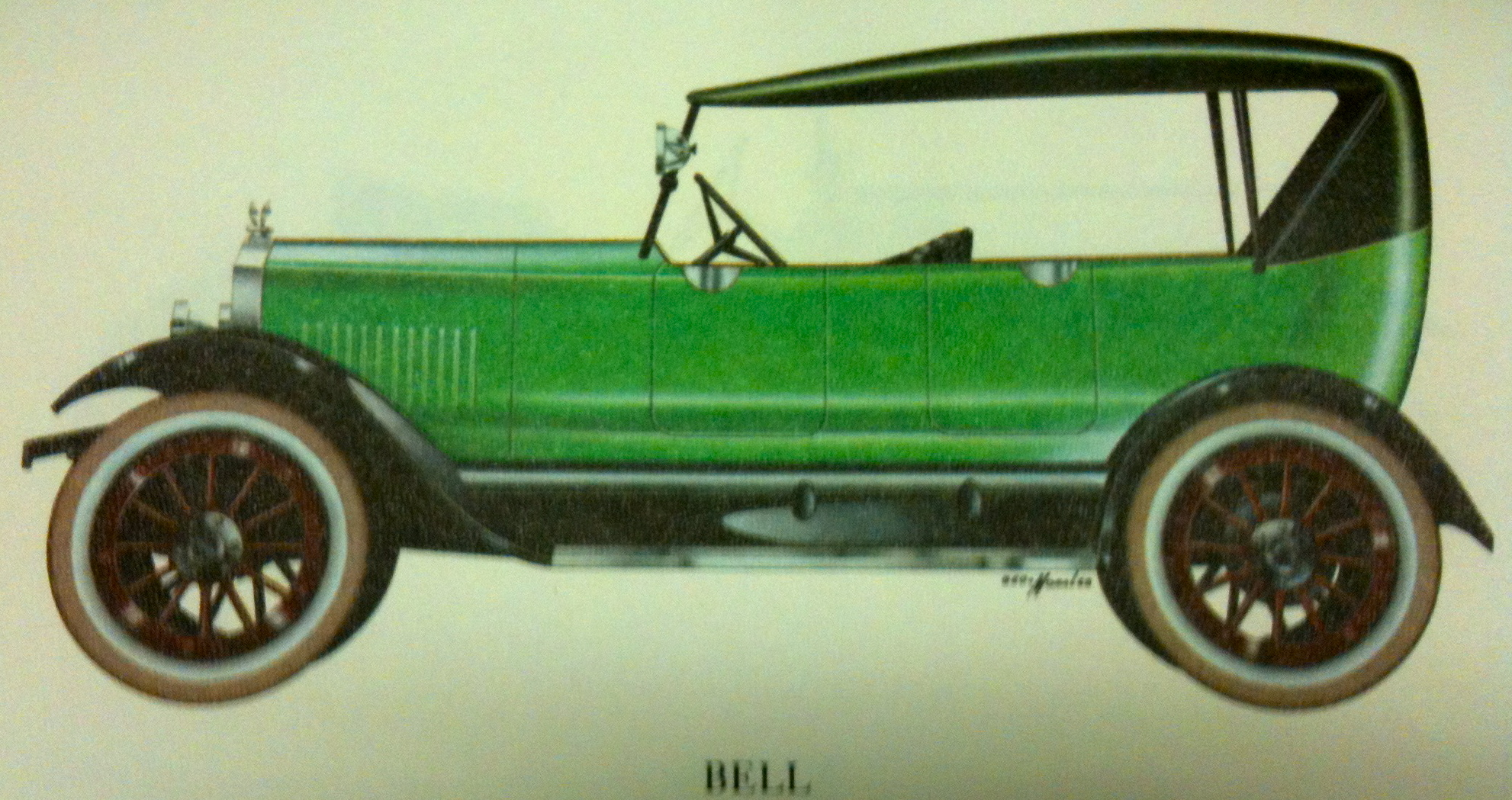
1920 Bell Touring Car

Bell Motor Cars Company was an American automobile company, based in York, Pennsylvania. They were also built under license in Barrie, Ontario. Unrelated cars named Bell were built in England (1905-1914) and France (1923-1925).

Formed in early 1915 The Bell Motor Car Co. was formed to manufacture a low priced car between $700 and $800 dollars. The company was capitalized at $50,000; all of the stock was held by the four incorporators, and production was expected to begin on July 1st. The first year goal was to produce 1,500 cars. The chief engineer behind the cars was Ernest T Gilliard, who previously worked at the Sphinx Motor Car Co. The initial president was Henry W. Stauffer.

In 1919 capital stock was increased from $50,000 to $300,000. Edward fox by this time had replaced Gilliard as president of the firm.

Bell, an assembler rather than a manufacturer, offered light cars with a Herschell-Spillman engine, Westinghouse starter and generator, Stromberg carburetor, Warner steering, Muncie transmission, and Atwater-Kent (domestic) or Simms magneto (export) ignition system.

For 1915 Bell introduced a line of automobiles named the Model 16, and were powered by a 30HP four cylinder Lycoming engine. A touring car and Roadster were offered on a 112 inch wheelbase and were priced at $775. The touring car weighed 2,200 pounds. The main selling points were that the Model 16 used "real genuine leather upholstering" and a "silk mohair "one man" top". According to reports the Bell "looked like a real automobile".

The Model 17 was introduced in 1916. Prices increased to $875. The model line then made 35HP and a touring car and roadster were still the only models offered.

By 1919 prices had increased to $1,150 for the roadster and touring car.

In 1920 the wheelbase increased to 114 inches, and the price increased to $1595 for a four cylinder car, but would be reduced to $1495 by the end of the year. The Lycoming engine would no longer be used, and instead a Herschell-Spillman would be employed. Horsepower was down to 32.

In 1921 a six cylinder car was added to the line for $1695. By either late 1921 or early 1922 prices would drop from 1495 to 1195 and eventually 1095 within a single year.

In 1921 the company would declare bankruptcy with a balance on hand for creditors of $13,426.

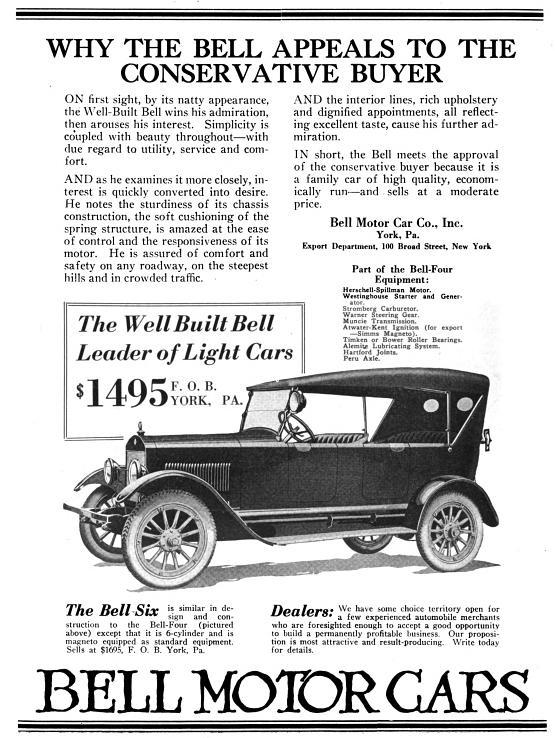
1921 Bell Motor Cars Ad

== Commercial vehicles ==
In addition to cars Bell manufactured a line of commercial vehicles. For 1915 a "Light Delivery Wagon" was built on the Model 16 chassis weighing 1,200 pounds and costing $750 to $775. It was available in an open or closed body and had electric lights and starter.

Sometime in late 1917 or early 1918 Bell purchased a factory that had belonged to the Pullman Motor Car Co for $40,000 to produce a 1 1/2 ton truck on three wheelbases, 112-124-136 inches. A new passenger car was also planned, but it is not clear if the new factory was where it would be made.

== Sources ==
- Clymer, Floyd. Treasury of Early American Automobiles, 1877-1925. New York: Bonanza Books, 1950

== See also ==
- List of automobile manufacturers
- List of defunct automobile manufacturers
