= George W. Davis Motor Car Company =

Defunct American motor vehicle manufacturer

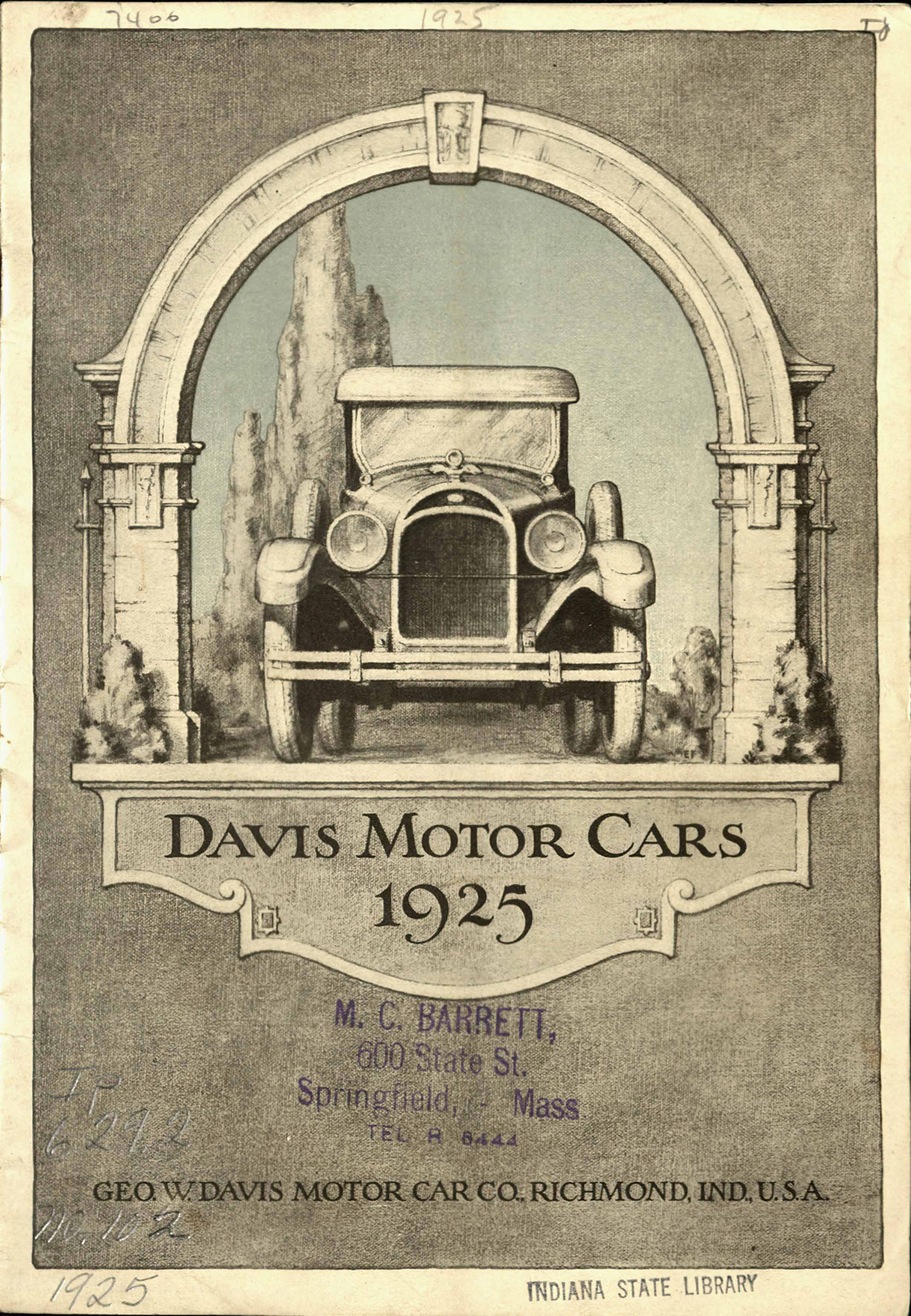
Cover of the 1925 Davis catalog

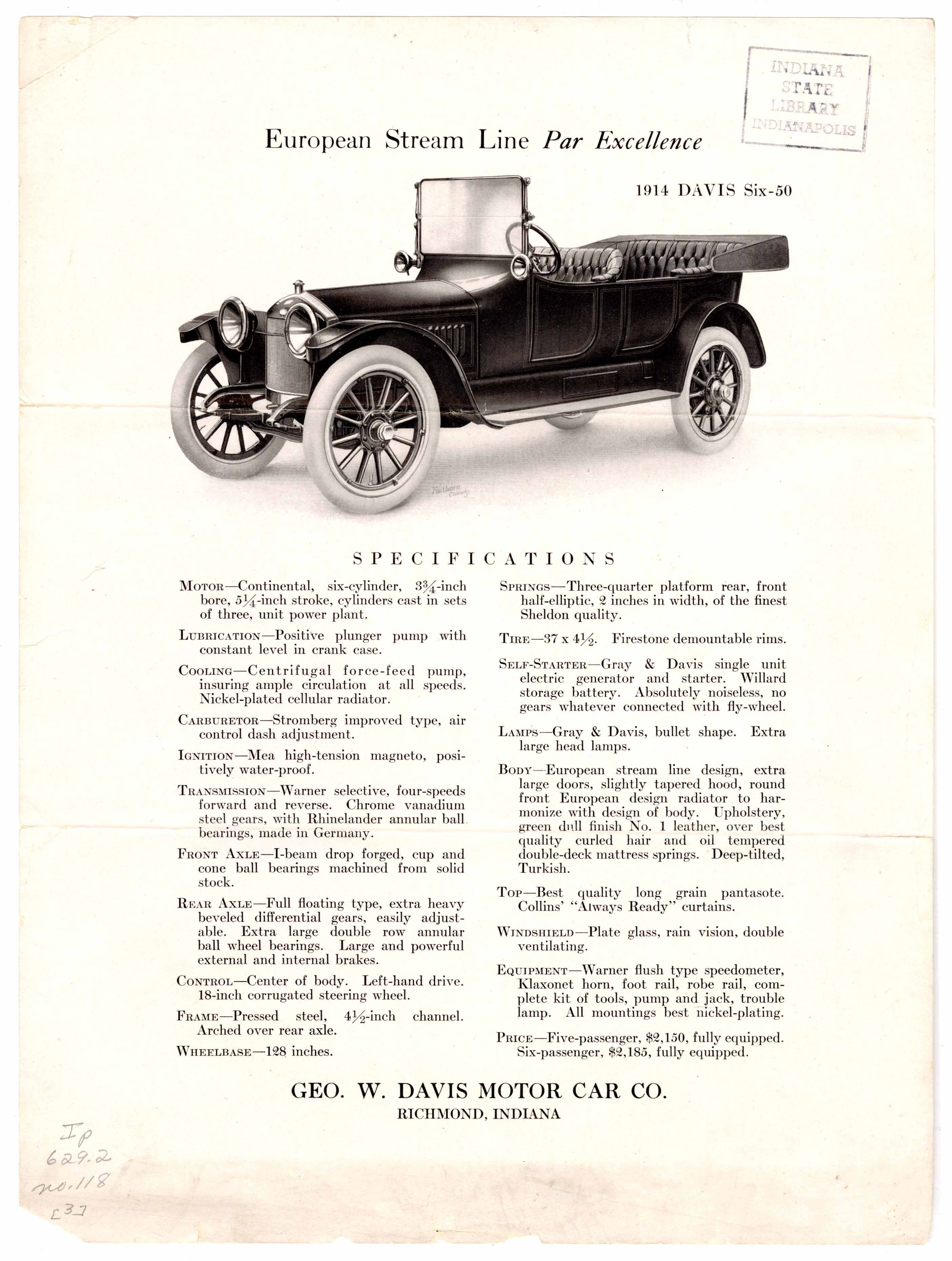
1914 Davis advertisement

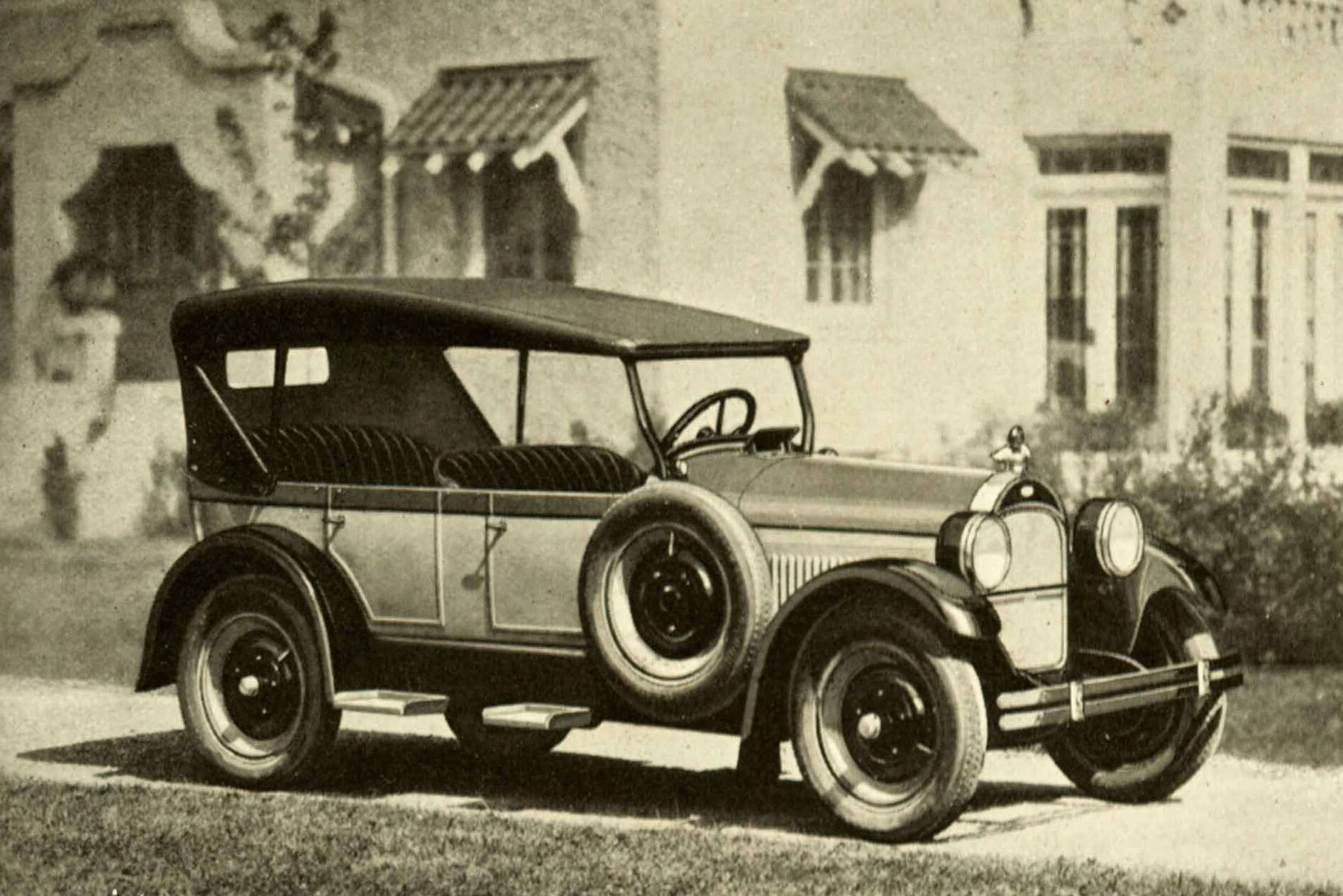
1925 Davis 90 Touring Phaeton

The George W. Davis Motor Car Company made Davis brand automobiles in Richmond, Indiana, from 1908 to 1929.

George W. Davis was born in Randolph county, Indiana on October 20, 1867, one of ten children in his family. When he was 18 years old, he went to work in a carriage and harness shop in Winchester, Indiana. He moved in Richmond, Indiana in 1902 and, in partnership with Walter McConaha and Frank Taylor, established the Davis & Taylor Carriage Company there.

In 1908, George W. Davis announced that he would build a car, named after himself. The earliest cars were motorized buggies. By 1911, proper touring cars were made, using 4-cylinder Continental engines, with 6-cylinder Continental units added three years later. A 12-cylinder engine was promised, but this never materialized. The local Richmond newspaper reported that Davis was unhappy about the weight of the 12-cylinder engine. Thus, after the fours were dropped from the lineup in 1916, all Davis cars bore a six-cylinder engine. It was not until 1927 that an 8-cylinder engine arrived.

Many Davises were exported, and a Davis placed first in a hill climb in Madrid, Spain in 1917. Also in 1917, the growing Davis company expanded by taking over the former Westcott factory in town. The Davis was an assembled car, meaning that it used components from various outside manufacturers, with little or none of the components made in-house. Davises were well known for their two-tone paint schemes and poetic model names, such as Fleetaway, Man o' War and Mountaineer.

The Davis served as the basis for two badge-engineered cars sold in Canada in the 1920s - the Winnipeg and the Derby.

The fortunes of the Davis company waned later in the 1920s. Later Davises were obsolete, and sales began to slip from the peak sales of the early 1920s. In February 1928, the company was acquired by the Automotive Corporation of America, led by Villor P. Williams. Williams was interested in gaining an automobile on which to install his Parkmobile device. The Parkmobile was a device which hydraulically raised the car up via a set of smaller wheels inboard of the standard ones. This allowed the vehicle to be rolled sideways into a parallel parking space. It operated "through the regular gearshift lever in conjunction with an extra lever operated from the transmission." The six-cylinder Davis was now renamed the New York Six, while the 8-cylinder model remained a Davis. Both of these were to get the Parkmobile device, only a few did, however. Any 1929 models were simply ones built using leftover 1928 parts.

Williams was evicted on May 30, 1929, for not paying rent, and returned to Baltimore, Maryland, where his Automotive Corporation was headquartered. The Richmond factory was turned over to the manufacture of power lawn mowers. Williams continued to advertise into early 1931 that more New York Six and Davis Eight automobiles with the Parkmobile device were to be forthcoming, but none ever materialized.
