= Elgin (automobile) =

Defunct American motor vehicle manufacturer

Elgin Motor Car Corporation (1916-1923); Elgin Motors, Inc. (1923-1924)
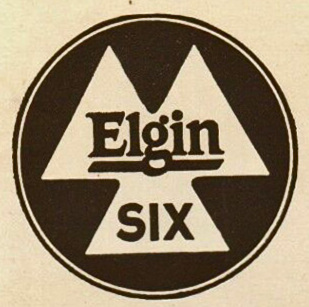
- Industry: Automotive
- Headquarters: *Argo, Illinois (1916-1923): Indianapolis, Indiana (1923-1924)

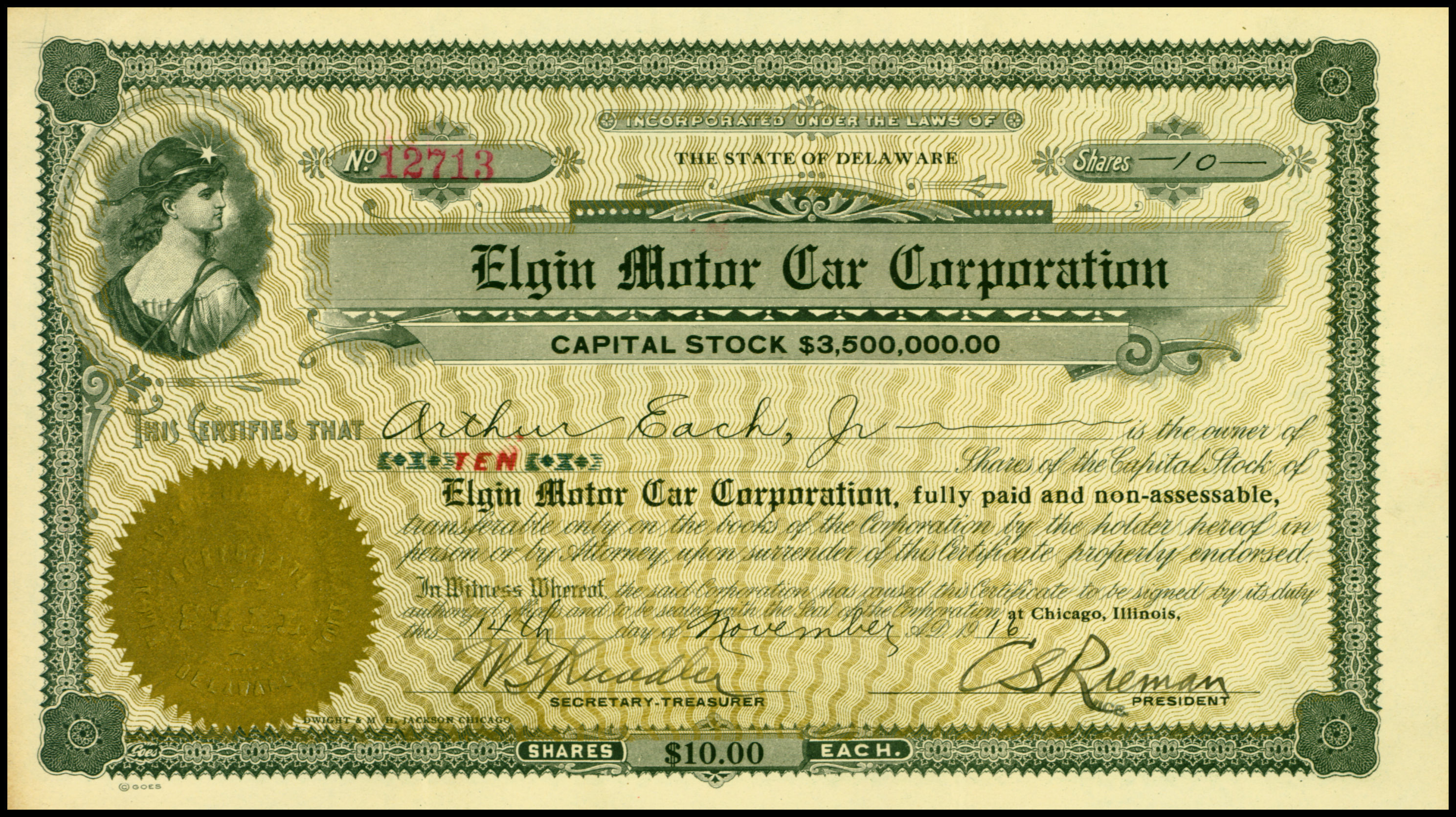
Share of the Elgin Motor Car Corporation, issued 14. November 1916

The Elgin automobile was manufactured by Elgin Motor Car Corporation in Argo, Illinois, from 1916 to 1923, and by Elgin Motors, Inc., in Indianapolis from 1923 to 1924. An offshoot, "The Elgin Race Car Company", was established by Mr. R. Skinner in Indianapolis in 1916, to take part in the Indianapolis 500 in 1917 and other board and track events.

Elgin Motor Car Corporation was formed in 1916 by several executives from the Elgin Watch Company. The company was based on the former New Era Motor Car Company of Joliet.

The Elgin achieved success in the Midwest endurance races in which it was entered. Advertising slogans included "The Car of the Hour" and "Built Like A Watch", alluding to the roots of the founders.

Dividends of 10% paid in stock in July 1916 and cash dividends of 5% in July 1920 proved so popular with stockholders that stockholder meetings had to be held in a tent. Sales of over $7 million in 1920 made that year the company's best ever. The recession of the early 1920s damaged the company, as it did so many other U.S. auto firms of the time. The company issued $500,000 in bonds to pay off loans and for working capital. Elgin Motors, Inc., was formed by stockholders in June 1923. J.H. McDuffee, formerly of Willys-Overland and Cole, was chosen as president and general manager. It was at this time that the firm was relocated to Indianapolis. The company moved into the former home of Federal Motor Works. By June of the next year, the company was already bankrupt, ending the marque as a whole.

Elgin entered several endurance tests with their standard cars and were successful in this regard. One private racer, a Mr. Skinner, was given an Elgin motor, frame and chassis by the company in 1916 to enter the 1917 Indianapolis 500. Skinner had the boat-tail body built, and the motor was uprated with larger valves and a revised differential ratio. In later years, the racecar was used successfully in board and track racing events. This was the only pure race car built using an Elgin automobile, and it still exists and is regularly raced in competition. Between mid-1917 and November 1918, commercial vehicles were also produced for the United States Army. The Long Tail Racer is extremely valuable, with cars with this verified history and rarity, fetching 7 figure sums at auction.

== Notes ==
The company also built an "Indianapolis Long Tail Racer," a specific long-tail model known as "Lucifer" and described as a "Black Devil" from 1917. Features: This particular race car has a straight-six engine, a crash gearbox, and no front brakes. It also features unique equipment, such as a screen to protect drivers' goggles from stones and an Elgin clock.

The race car still exists, Elgin Long Tail Racer, a specific long-tail racing car built for the Elgin Motor Car Corporation, is still is used in competition. The owner, Patrick J. Feeney, from Ireland, restored the car in 2024.

https://youtube.com/shorts/OUmxim9uVpQ?si=_8Mg1wkAamRYsScS

https://youtube.com/shorts/OUmxim9uVpQ?si=Jc0g7zkTXMeW7b0s

== Production ==
Year	Production figures	Production according to Seltzer, Lawrence H.
1915		150
1916	671	725
1917	987	2.800
1918	1.316	4.500
1919	4.123	5.000
1920	4.613	6.000
1921	3.173	1.500
1922	1.161	1.100
1923	417	1.100
1924	323	
Sum	16.784	22.875
