= Covert (automobile) =

Defunct American motor vehicle manufacturer

Covert Motor Vehicle Company
- Type: Automobile manufacturing
- Industry: Automotive
- Founded: 1901; 125 years ago
- Defunct: 1907; 119 years ago
- Headquarters: Rochester, New York, United States
- Area served: United States
- Products: Vehicles automotive parts

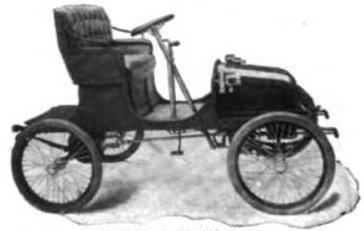
Covert Chainless

B. V. Covert and Company was a manufacturer of automobiles in Lockport, New York, from 1901 to 1907. The company started as a manufacturer of steam-powered cars, but later switched to gas-powered vehicles. Some Coverts were exported to England as Covert-Jacksons.

== History ==
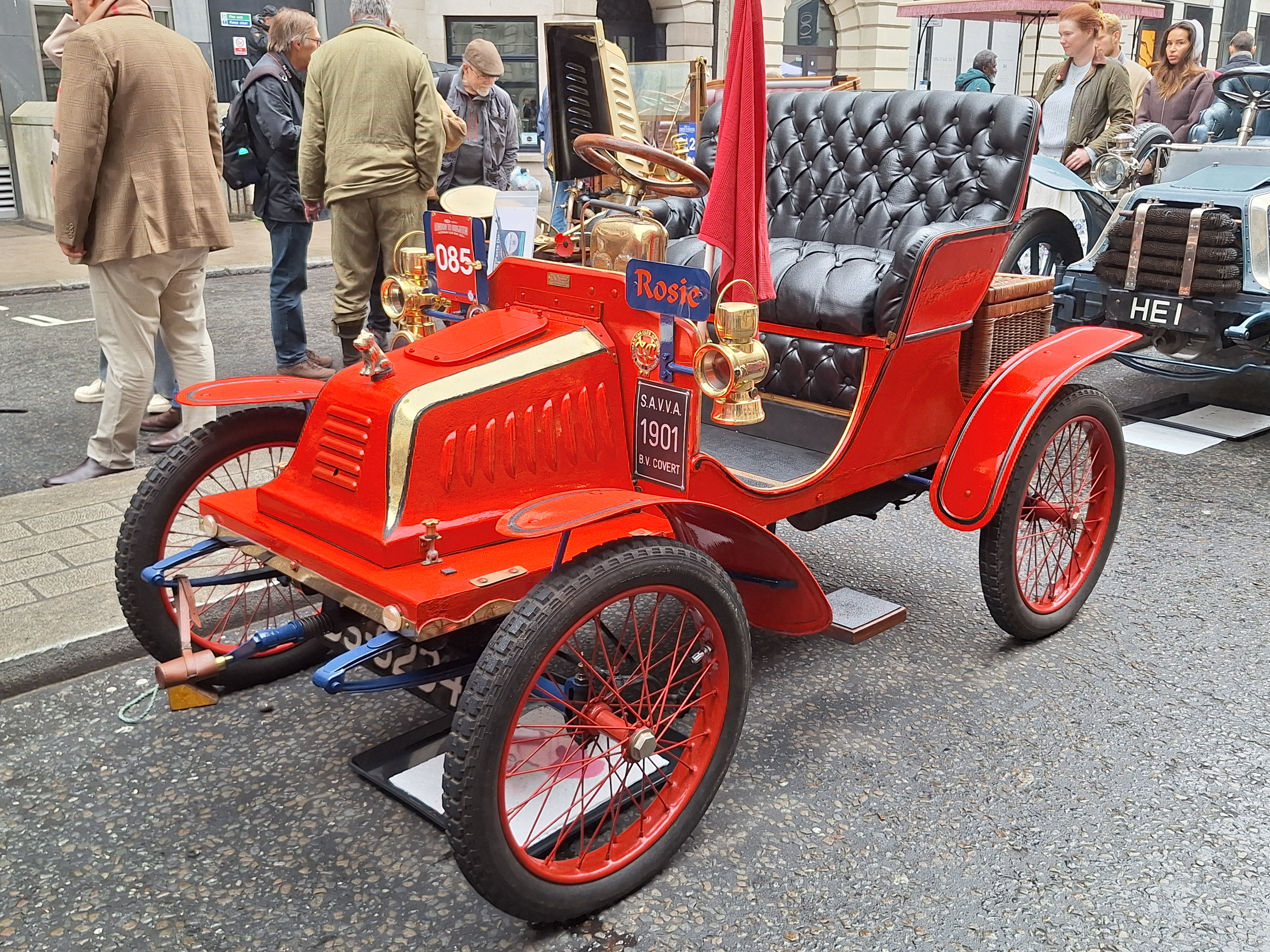
1902 Covert at the St James Motoring Spectacle, London 2024

Covert light runabout (1901)

The 1904 Covert was a small, inexpensive touring car model. It could seat two passengers and sold for US$750. The vertically mounted single-cylinder engine, situated at the front of the car, produced 6 hp (4.5 kW). A two-speed sliding transmission was fitted. The angle iron-framed car weighed 750 lb (340 kg). It was one of the least expensive conventional touring cars on the market, but used the modern Système Panhard found on much more full-featured cars from Europe.

Later, Covert became a manufacturer of components for cars and commercial vehicles, known as Covert Gear. Mostly suspension parts and axles were produced.

== See also ==
- List of defunct United States automobile manufacturers
- Brass Era car

== Advertisements ==
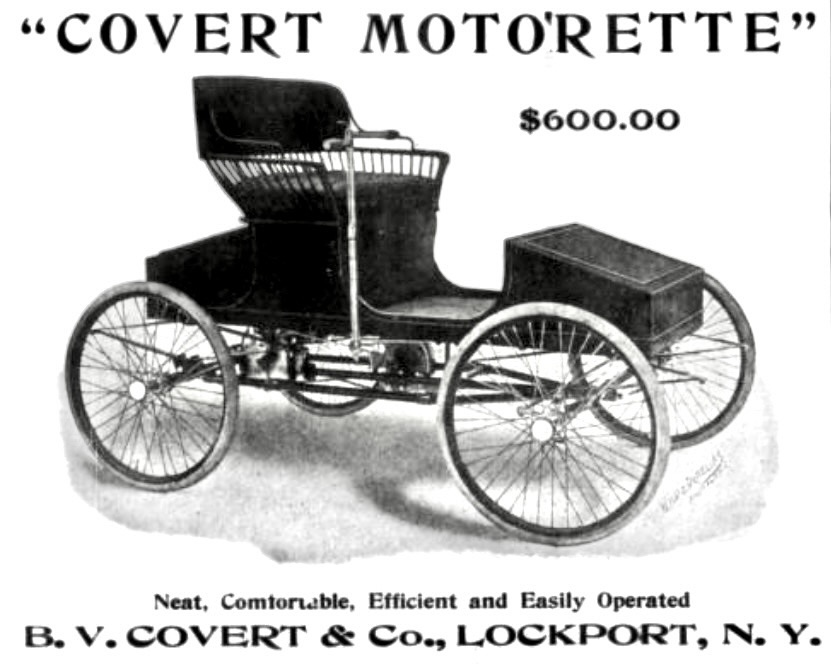
Covert Motorette (1902)

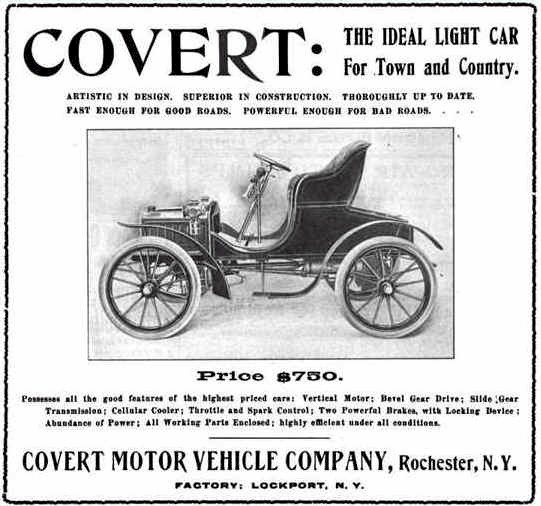
Covert Motor Vehicle Company of Rochester, New York - 1903
