= Columbus Motor Vehicle Company =

Defunct American motor vehicle manufacturer

- Formerly: Groff-Runkle Motor Vehicle Company
- Founded: 1901; 125 years ago
- Founder: Charles W. Groff and J. Frank Runkle
- Defunct: 1904; 122 years ago
- Fate: Bankruptcy
- Headquarters: Columbus, Ohio, United States
- Products: Automobiles
- Production output: unknown (1902-1904)
- Brands: Santos-Dumont

The Columbus Motor Vehicle Company was an automobile manufacturer in Columbus, Ohio, from 1902 to 1904.

== History ==
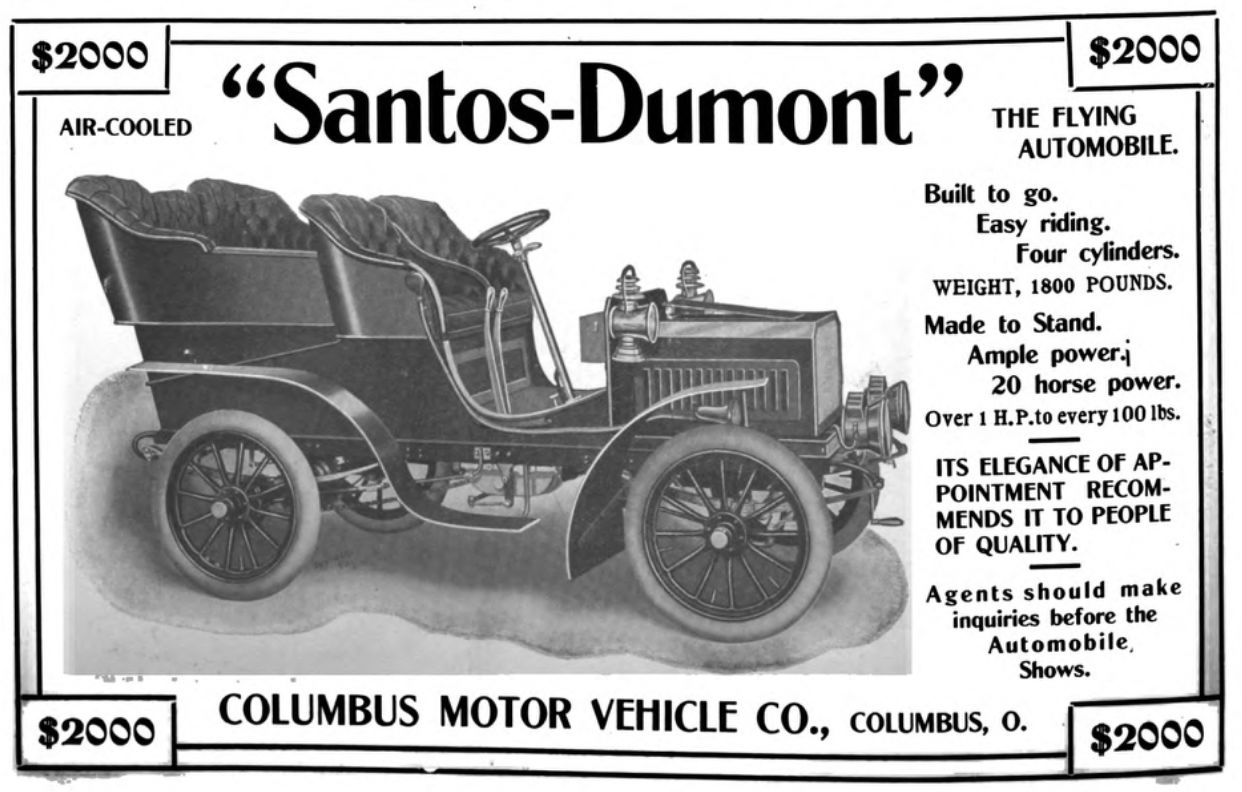
Columbus Motor Vehicle Company Model „Santos-Dumont"

As early as 1899, Charles W. Groff and J. Frank Runkle experimented with automobiles. At the end of 1901, they founded the Groff-Runkle Motor Vehicle Company in Columbus, Ohio. In 1901, a prototype was completed, which successfully completed a test drive between Columbus and Wooster, Ohio. Later, Mr. Frank Burkholder, Barton Griffiths, and George W. Groff financially joined the company. With the initial capital of $50,000 provided by the financiers, the Columbus Motor Vehicle Company could be founded. The first vehicle was the 'Santos Dumont' model, named in honor of the Brazilian-French aviation pioneer. In 1903, the company introduced an additional, smaller model. This single-cylinder runabout with 9 hp as an entry-level vehicle cost 1,250 dollars.

== Models ==
- Santos Dumont
- 9 HP Runabout

== See also ==
- List of defunct United States automobile manufacturers
- Veteran vehicles
