= Hollier =

Defunct American motor vehicle manufacturer

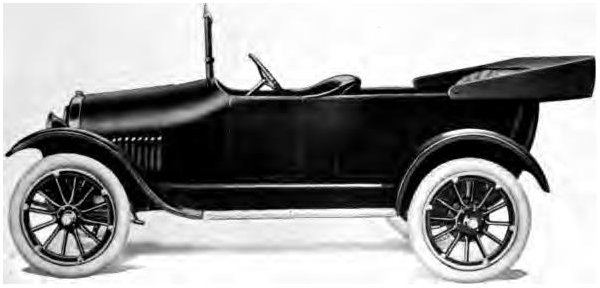
1916 Hollier Touring Car

The Hollier, also known as the Vincent-Hollier, was an automobile built in Chelsea and Jackson, Michigan by Charles Lewis, president of the Lewis Spring and Axle Company from 1915 to 1921. The Hollier was available originally with a V-8 engine of their own design. A later offering, starting in 1917, was powered by a six-cylinder Falls engine. Only open models were built. The company name was changed in 1921 to the Hollier Automobile Company, so that when production ended, it did not impact on the parent company (Lewis Spring and Axle Company).

== Models ==
Year	Engine	HP	Wheelbase
1915	V Eight	40	112"
1916	V Eight	40	112"
1917	V Eight(Inline Six)	40(21.6)	116"
1918	V Eight(Inline Six)	40(25.35)	116"
1919-1921	Inline Six	55	120"
