= Fredonia (automobile) =

Automobile manufacturer

- Industry: Automotive
- Founded: 1891
- Defunct: 1904
- Fate: Bankruptcy, assets sold to creditors
- Headquarters: Youngstown, Ohio
- Products: Wagons, Automobiles

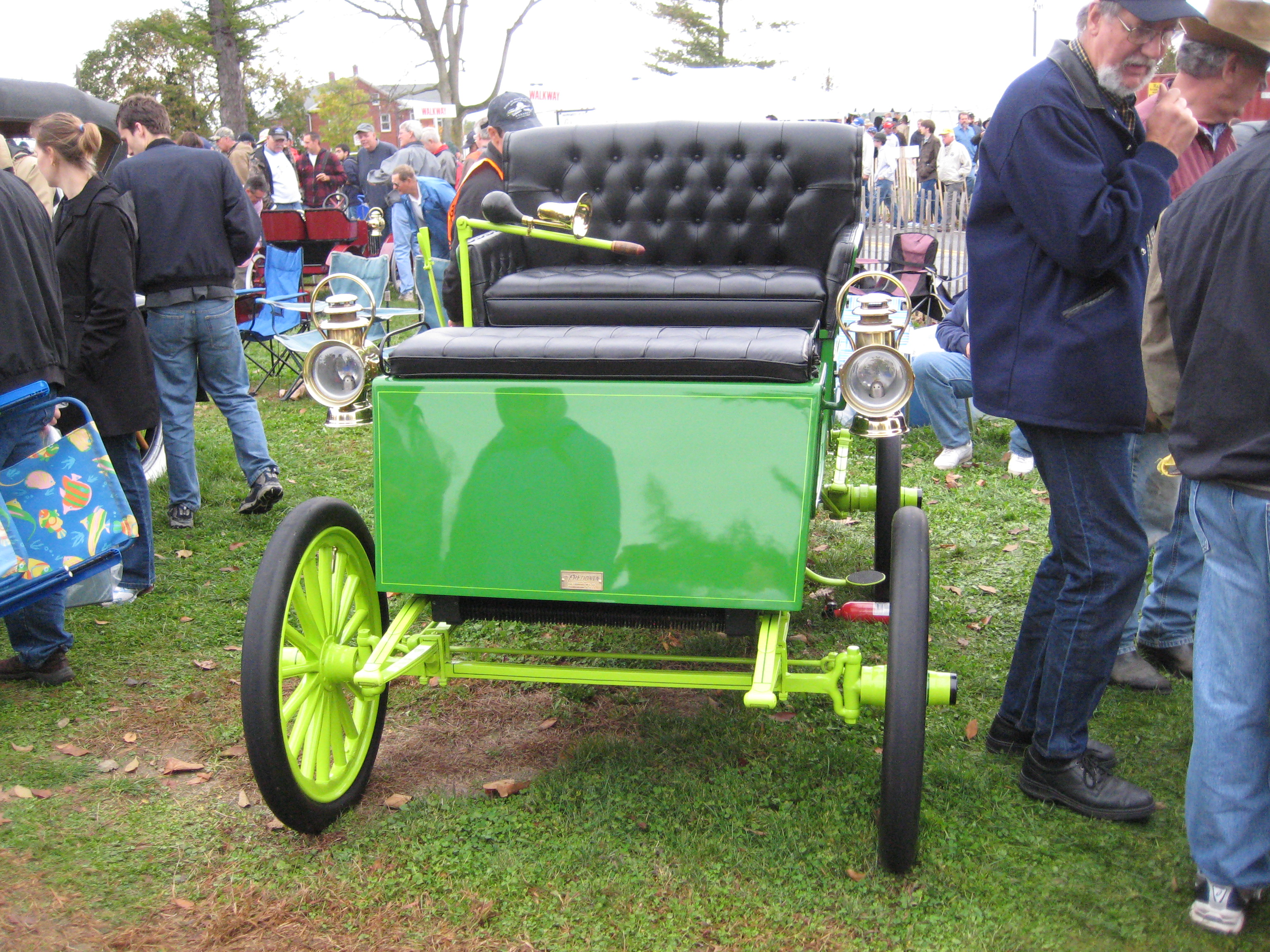
A Fredonia at a car show in Hershey, Pennsylvania in 2009

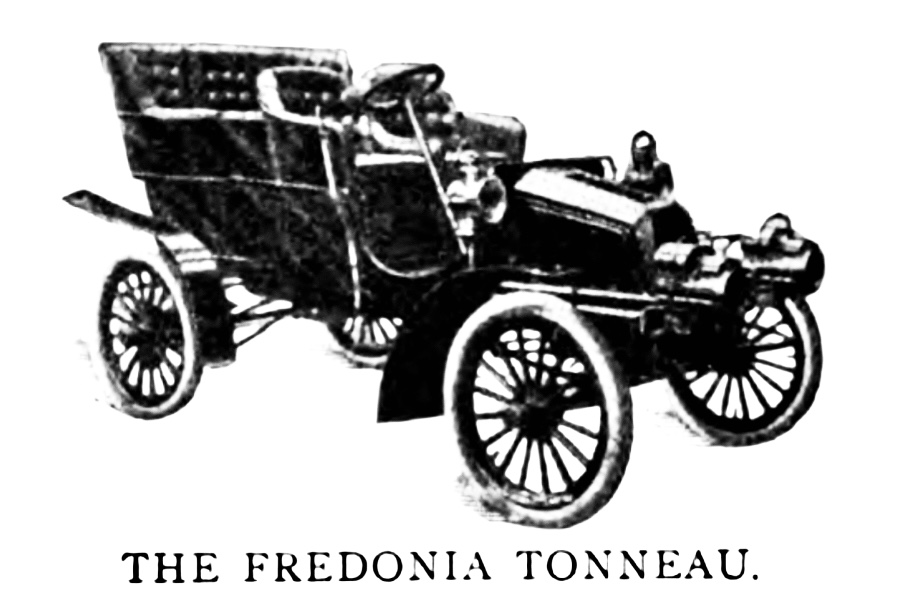
Fredonia Tonneau (1904)

Fredonia Manufacturing Company was an automobile manufacturer in founded in Youngstown, Ohio. The company was founded in 1891, and collapsed due to bankruptcy in 1904.

== History ==
The origins of the Fredonia Manufacturing Company can be traced back to 1891 when the company was formed to manufacture buggies, wagons, and the "Simmons Couplings". The company was created after purchasing the assets of the Fredonia Carriage Company, and the Gear Company of Fredonia PA. After the purchase the assets of the former companies were moved to Youngstown, OH, a planing mill there was remodeled and a new three story factory was constructed. A workforce of 40 men began working on March 16, 1891. Myron Wood was the original president, and Lorenzo Lane was the original vice president.

In December 1895, one of the earliest motor cars in America was taken for a test drive. It was a car manufactured for an early auto enthusiast named Dr C. C. Booth, who was a physician in Youngstown. The car was powered by a 3-horsepower engine by the Pierce-Crouch Engine Co of New Brighton PA. The body, and possibly the assembly, was provided by the Fredonia Mfg co. The car weighed 1,250 pounds and was described as overweight. But despite the weight the car managed to hit 18 miles and hour and was not stopped by mud that ran up to the hubs.

On Memorial Day 1896 "Cosmopolitan Magazine" held an auto race that ran from KingsBridge, through Yonkers and Hastings, and Dobb's Ferry to the final destination at Irvington-on-Hudson. The entire race was about 13 miles. Six cars were entered; four Duryea cars, an unnamed French car, and a car manufactured by Fredonia Mfg. The car made by Fredonia is presumably the same car that was made in 1895. Duryea took first and second place, the first place car finished the race in 1 hour 5 minutes and 42 seconds. The French car took third and the Fredonia and other cars did not finish.

In 1899 an inquiry would be submitted to "The Horseless Age Magazine" by Fredonia Mfg. The company would be seeking advice on how to muffle a 6h.p. engine with a 6-inch stroke, the company reported difficulty in muffling an engine without choking it. It is unclear if the company was experimenting with another automobile at this time.

By 1901 the company had listed automobiles as part of their business in addition to their traditional surreys and fifth wheels.

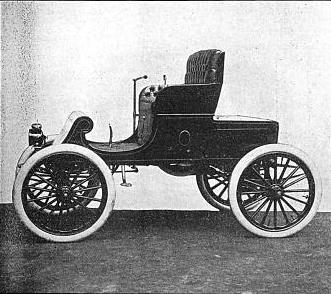
1902 Fredonia Runabout

In early 1902 Fredonia would increase their capitalization from $50,000 to $150,000. The purpose was to fund their expansion into car manufacturing. From October 9–15 of the same year Fredonia would participate in the American Automobile Club of America's New York to Boston Reliability Run. The run would have 75 starting cars and would run from New York to Boston and back. The total distance was 488 miles. Of the original 75, 68 would complete the run. The Fredonia would not owing to engine trouble and a leaking tire at one point. Their entry was a two-seat gasoline runabout weighing 1300 pounds with a 9-horsepower one cylinder engine. Despite the fact that the car did not finish the company was awarded the highest honor for the reliability run, and was given a gold medal and their name, along with the 16 other winners, were engraved on the President's Cup which was kept at the A.C.A. clubhouse.

In 1903 advertising would pick up significantly and the company would adopt the slogan "For Daily Use". Many of the advertisements would include reliability run results.

=== Bankruptcy ===
On August 27, 1904, the company would be placed into the hands of a receiver. The company had struggled to pay debts, and had unpaid debts, some as old as early 1901 that still were not paid. Reasons cited for the companies struggles were the panic of 1893, and an under subscription of their capital stock ($36,000 vs the $50,000 authorized). As a result, the company was short on working capital even before auto production which was significantly more capital intense than wagon manufacturing. At the time of receivership the company owed over $18,000 and had assets of $3,000.

Possibly the final blow for the company came from the delays suffered in making their first production prototype. The prototype was to be finished by an outside mechanic who was to have the car completed by April 1902, but the car would not be finished for over a year. This would have the effect of tying up enormous amounts of money and would damage the small company permanently.

Another reason is that a major supporter of the company had died a year before the company's bankruptcy and as a result no more money was being injected into the unprofitable company.

A reorganization and successor company was planned under the name "The Horton & Smith Manufacturing Company", but no evidence can be found that this ever materialized.

=== Models ===
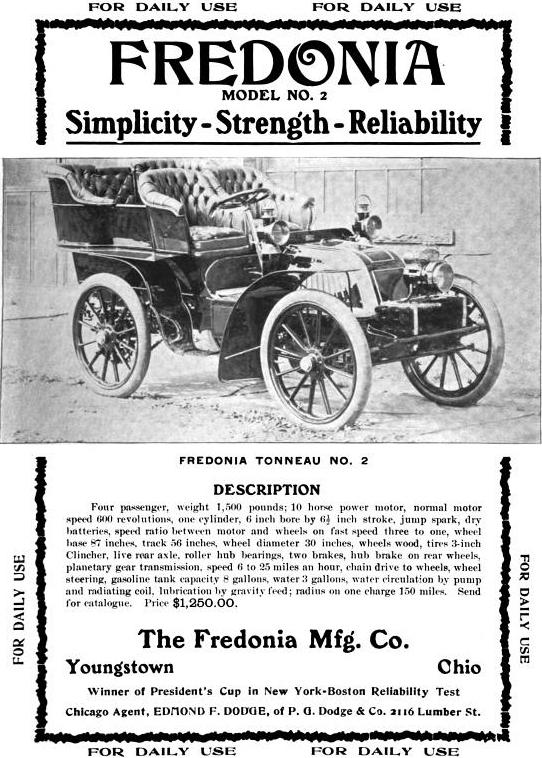
Ca. 1903 Fredonia Tonneau Ad

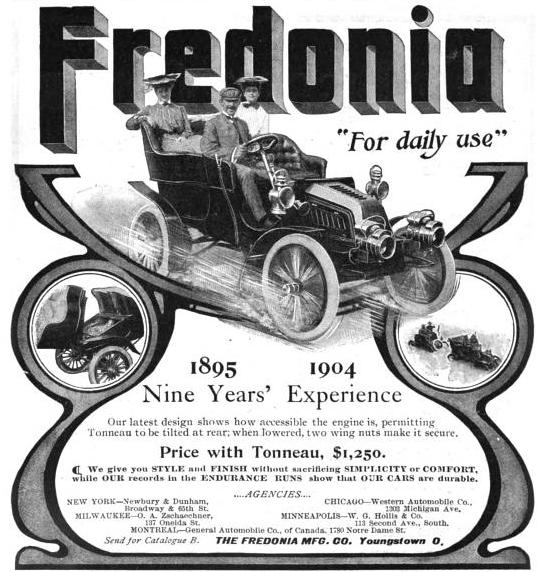
1904 Fredonia Ad

The 1902 Fredonia Runabout was a runabout model. It could seat 2 passengers and sold for $1000. The flat-mounted water-cooled single-cylinder engine, situated at the center of the car, produced 9 hp (6.7 kW). The channel steel-framed car weighed 1300 lb (590 kg) and used full elliptic springs. The wheelbase was 72 inches and the car had a stop speed of 30 miles an hour.

The 1903 Fredonia Tonneau No. 2 was introduced in early 1903, and it could seat 5 passengers and sold for $1250. The flat-mounted water-cooled single-cylinder engine, situated amidships of the car, produced 10 hp (7.5 kW). A 2-speed planetary transmission was fitted as on the Ford Model A and other Detroit cars of the time. The channel steel-framed car weighed 1650 lb (748 kg) and used full elliptic springs like the Runabout. top speed was 25 miles an hour. In 1904 the single cylinder 10 hp engine would be either replaced or supplemented by a 2-cylinder 12 hp engine.

The 1904 Fredonia Touring Car. For 1904 a new model would be added to the lineup, a two-seat touring car. It would use the same engine as the Runabout but the engine would be in the front as opposed to the rear engine runabout.
