= Briggs-Detroiter =

Defunct American motor vehicle manufacturer

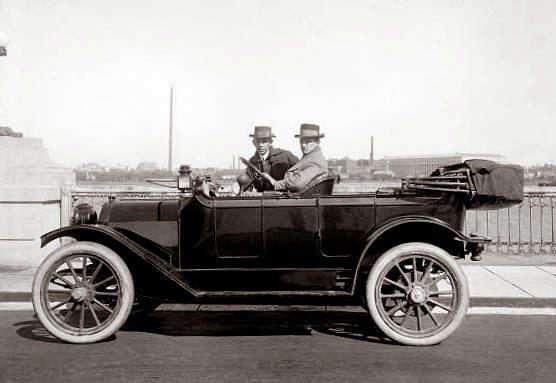
Herbert E. French and his Detroiter in Washington, D.C.

The Briggs-Detroiter (or more commonly, just Detroiter) was an American automobile manufactured in Detroit, Michigan, by the Briggs-Detroiter Motor Car Company from 1912 to 1917. It was planned to be a bigger and better version of the Brush Runabout.

Early models were built with a 32 hp L-head engine. A five-seater touring car was sold in 1915 for $1,295 and featured a V8 engine of 3.3L capacity. The car had radiators with curved cross-sections.
