= Benjamin Briscoe =

American automotive pioneer

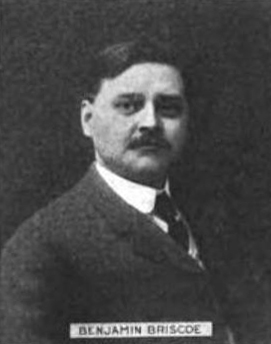
- Benjamin Briscoe, December 1909
- Born: May 1867; Detroit, Michigan, U.S.
- Died: June 26, 1945 (aged 78); Dunnellon, Florida, U.S.
- Occupations: Automobile pioneer, industrialist

Benjamin Briscoe (May 1867 – June 26, 1945) was an American automobile pioneer and industrialist.

Briscoe entered business for himself at the age of 18 with capital of $472, organizing the firm of Benjamin Briscoe & Co. to manufacture sheet-metal stampings. This later became part of the American Can Company. He then invented a machine for the production of corrugated pipe for the Briscoe and Detroit Galvanizing Works, later the Briscoe Manufacturing Company.

== Biography ==
In 1901, the automobile industry was in its infancy when Briscoe helped finance David Buick's first car. In return for the finance, Briscoe gained a 97% interest in the Buick Motor Company. He sold Buick in 1904 to James H. Whiting (1842–1919), owner of Flint (Michigan) Wagon Works, and used the money to help found the Maxwell-Briscoe Motor Company, makers of the Maxwell automobile. This was probably his greatest success in the industry. By 1909 they were the third-biggest American make, with 9,400 sales. The company was backed by J. P. Morgan & Co. and Richard Irvin & Co., but in the panic of 1907, Briscoe had the first of many bad experience with bankers and was forced to do his own financing.

Briscoe conceived the idea of consolidating the four largest automobile manufacturers—Ford Motor Company, Buick, REO, and Maxwell-Briscoe—into one company. His negotiations with William C. Durant, Henry Ford, and Ransom E. Olds failed, so he proceeded to organize his own corporation along the broad lines he envisaged resulting in the United States Motor Company.

U. S. Motors continued production of the Maxwell and was soon also producing the Stoddard-Dayton car, the Brush Runabout (in which his brother Frank Briscoe was a principal), Alden-Sampson trucks, and others. The firm continued to operate the old Maxwell-Briscoe plants and bought up such concerns as the Columbia Motor Car Co., owner of many patents, including the Selden patent. Briscoe had an option on the Cadillac car at one time, but never exercised it, and it eventually went to Durant, who had organized the General Motors Corporation.

In 1910 bankers invested $6,000,000 in U. S. Motors, but the financing proved inadequate and the firm went into receivership in 1912. Briscoe was forced out and Walter Flanders took over and reorganized the assets as Maxwell Motor Co. (Incorporated), which itself was later reorganized as the Chrysler Corporation.

A few months after leaving U. S. Motors, he and his brother formed Briscoe Frères at Billancourt, France, home of the Renault, to design and build a car on the continent according to American methods. The result was the Ajax. A year later the brothers brought out the Briscoe car in America manufactured at Jackson, Michigan, but which they promoted as the first French-designed American car. When World War I broke out, Benjamin Briscoe turned his manufacturing facilities over to war production and he never returned to the automobile business. His partners continued to manufacture Briscoe models until 1923.

During World War I, he joined the United States Navy with the rank of lieutenant commander. He saw service in both Italy and France and received the Navy Cross and was a member of the French Legion of Honor.

After the war, Briscoe and a group of others developed a new process for refining crude oil. He then went to Montreal, Quebec, Canada, as an executive in an oil company later taken over by the Texas Company (Texaco). Later he was involved in gold mining and ore milling in Colorado. About 1940 he retired to a 3,000-acre (12 km^{2}) plantation in Marion County, Florida, where he experimented in growing tung trees.

Benjamin Briscoe died at age 78 in his home near Dunnellon, Florida.

== Sources ==
- "Benjamin Briscoe, Auto Pioneer, Dies" New York Times, 28 June 1945, page 19.
