= USMC (disambiguation) =

USMC is the United States Marine Corps.

USMC may also refer to:

== Organizations ==
- United Shoe Machinery Corporation
- United States Maritime Commission
- United States Motor Company
- University of St. Michael's College, a federated university in the University of Toronto, Canada

== Other uses ==
- United States–Mexico–Canada Agreement, a free trade agreement
