= Brush Motor Car Company =

Michigan automobile manufacturer active 1907-1913

Brush Runabout
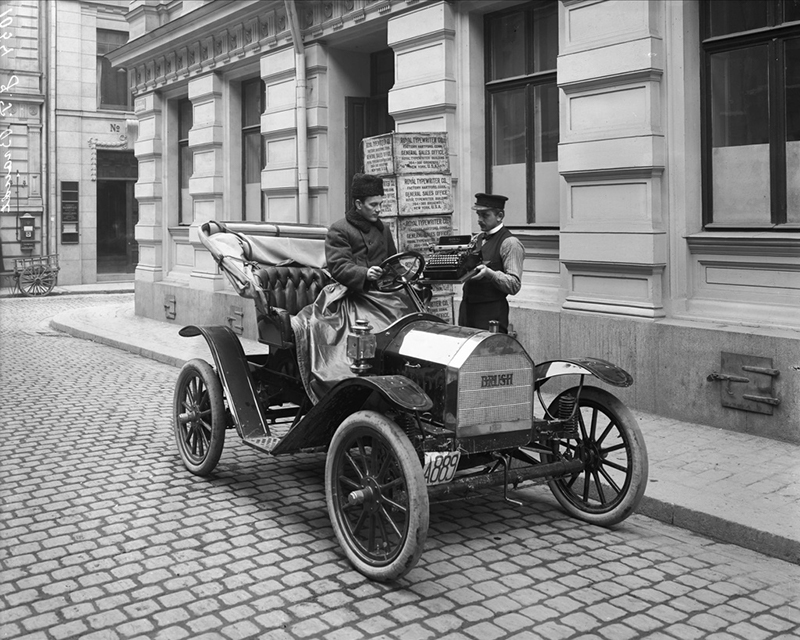

Overview
- Manufacturer: Brush Motor Car Company (1907-1909); Brush Runabout Company (1909-1913)
- Production: 1907–1913; 13,250 produced

Body and chassis
- Class: Entry-level car
- Body style: runabout (2 passenger); delivery

Powertrain
- Engine: One Cylinder,

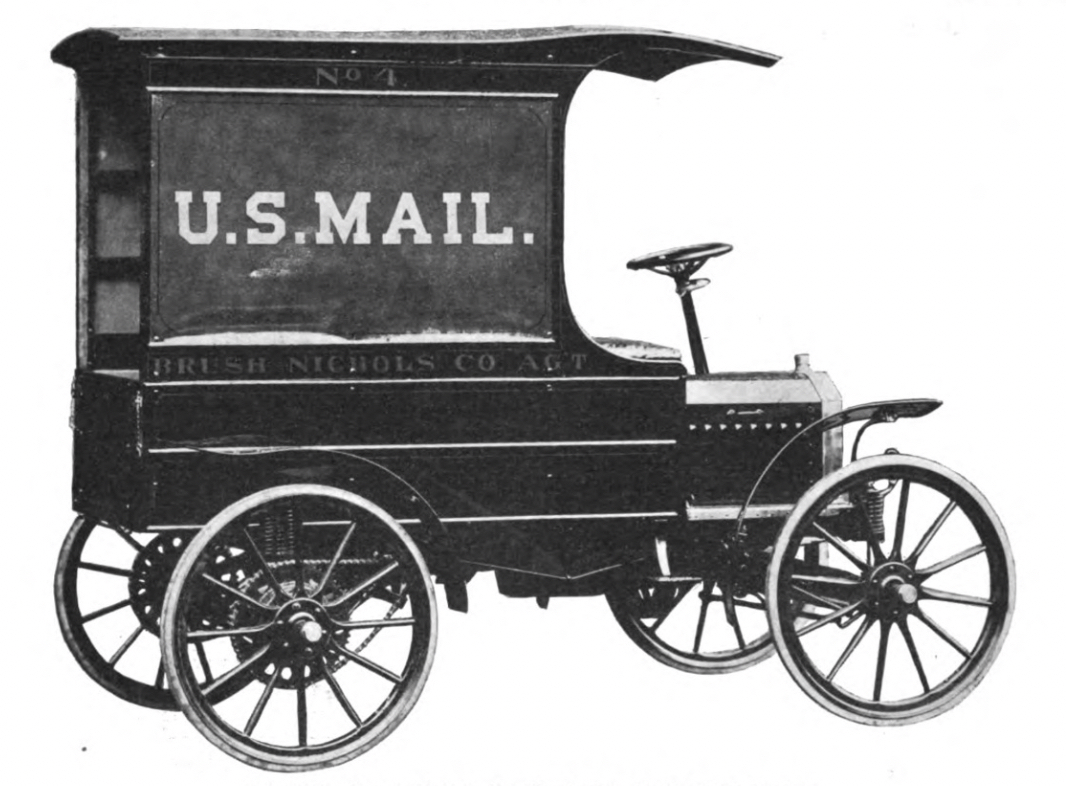
Brush 6 HP (1908); The single-cylinder engine had 824 cc with a bore of 101.6 mm and a stroke of 101.6 mm

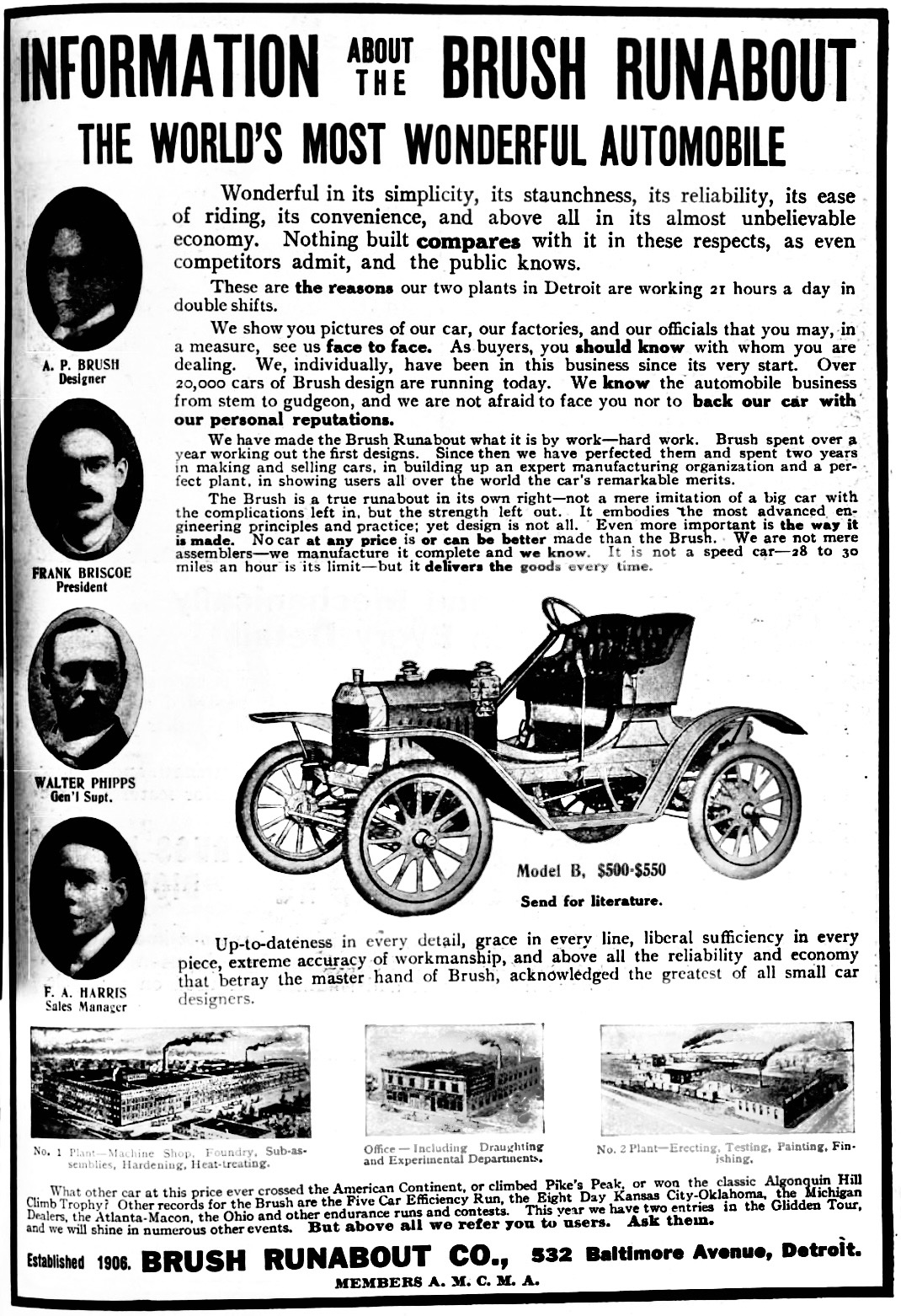
Brush Model B advertisement (1909)

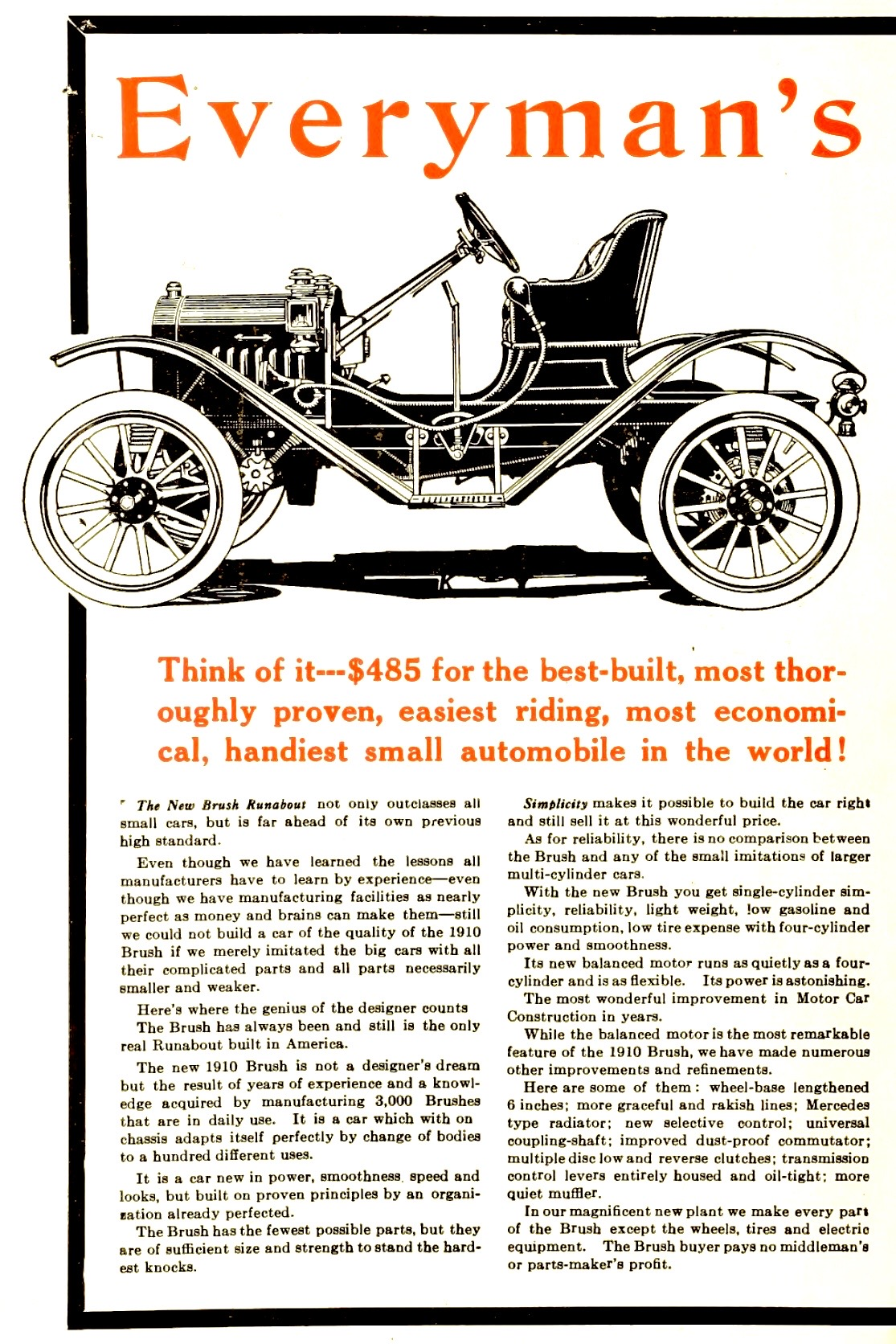
Brush Runabout (1910)

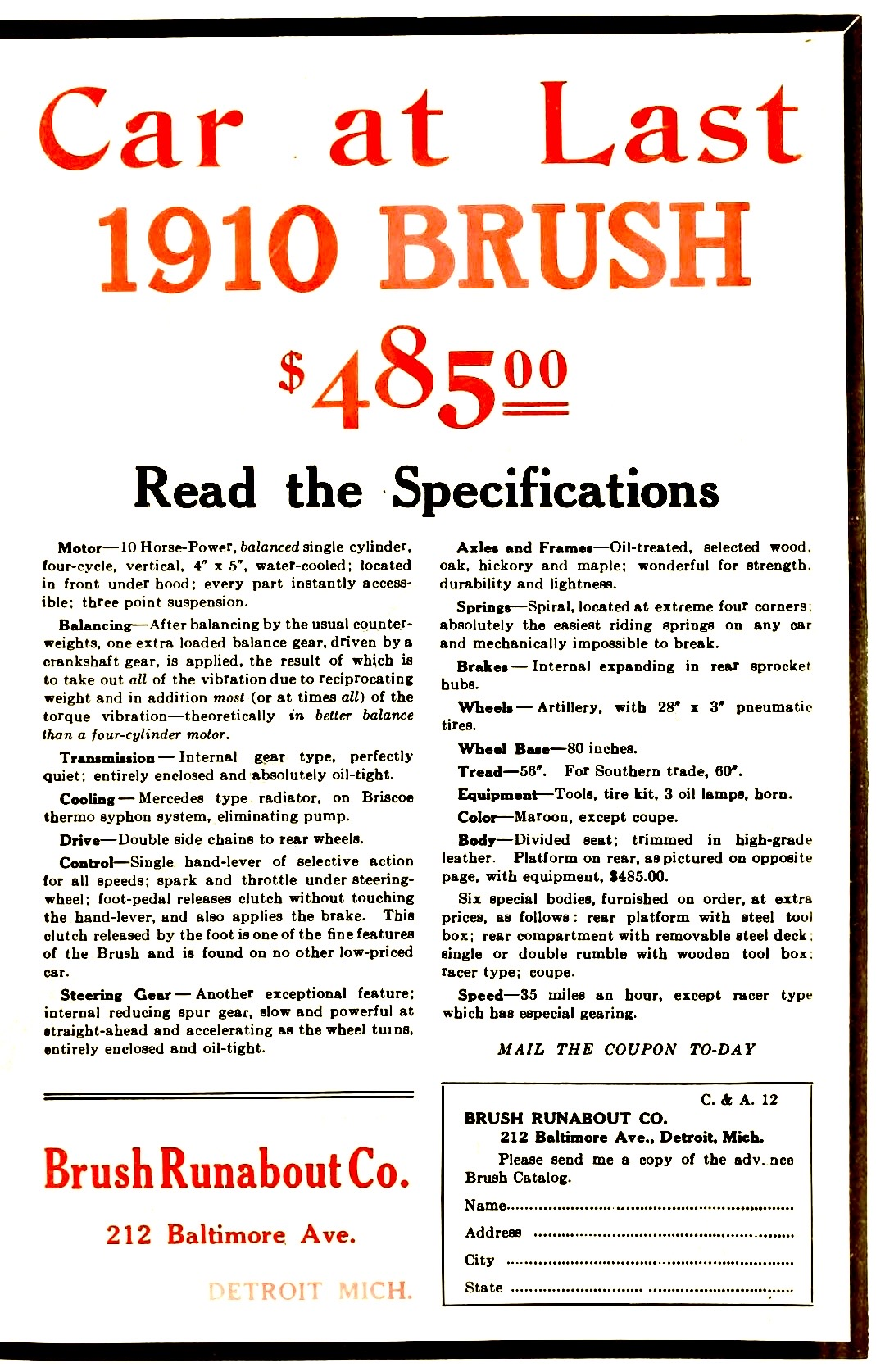
Brush Runabout (1910)

Brush Motor Car Company (1907-1909), later the Brush Runabout Company (1909-1913), was based in Highland Park, Michigan.

== History ==
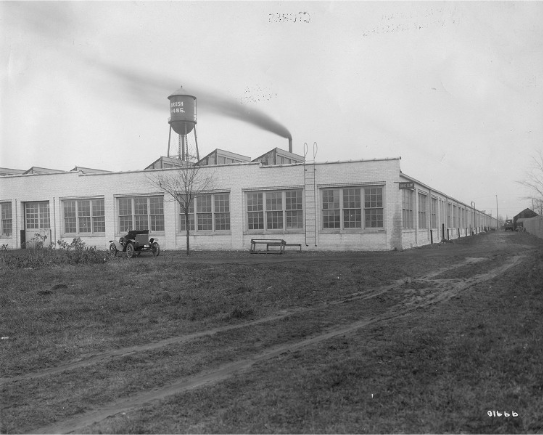
Brush Runabout Company factory at 12568 Oakland Ave, Highland Park, MI 48203

The company was founded by Alanson Partridge Brush (February 10, 1878, Michigan – March 6, 1952, Michigan). He was a self-taught prolific designer, working with Henry Leland at Oldsmobile, and went on to help design the original one-cylinder Cadillac engine. Although there were many makes of small runabouts of similar size and one to four cylinders at this time (before the Model T Ford dominated the low-price market), the Brush has many unusual design details showing the inventiveness of its creator. The Brush Runabout Company, along with Maxwell-Briscoe, Stoddard-Dayton, and others formed Benjamin Briscoe's United States Motor Company(USMC) from 1910, ending when that company failed in 1913. Runabouts, in general, fell out of vogue quickly, partly due to the lack of protection from the weather.

After Brush and the other companies of the USMC folded into Maxwell Motor Company, President Walter Flanders wrote in 1913 document "Why We Did Not Use All Our Plants", the Brush factory in Detroit (along with the Flanders and Sampson Plants) were to remain open and running as factories. The modern successor is Stellantis North America/Chrysler.

== Design ==
=== Brush ===
Touted as the "Everyman's Car", Brush designed a light car with a wooden chassis (wooden rails and iron cross-members), friction drive transmission and "underslung" coil springs in tension instead of compression on both sides of each axle. Two gas-powered headlamps provided light, along with a gas-powered light in the rear. The frame, axles, and wheels were made of oak, hickory or maple, and were either left plain or painted to match the trim. Wider axles were available for use in the Southern region of the United States, where a 60-inch tread fit wagon ruts on country roads. The horn was located next to the engine cover, with a metal tube running to a squeeze bulb affixed near the driver. A small storage area was provided in the rear, with a drawer accessible under the rear of the seat.

The engines were a single-cylinder, four-stroke water cooled design, producing 6BHP, with power going to a chain-driven rear axle. Lacking a differential drive, the rear-axle disengaged one of the rear wheels while driving around a curve to avoid undue wear and tear on the drivetrain. A feature of engines designed by Brush was that they ran counter-clockwise instead of the usual clockwise. This was Brush's idea intended to make them safer for a right-handed person to crank-start by hand. Prior to the invention of the electric starter, crank-starting a clockwise-running engines frequently resulted in dislocated thumbs and broken forearms if the hand crank kicked back on starting.

According to a contemporary review from Cycle and Automobile Trade Journal in 1907, author Hugh Dolnar described the recently introduced Brush as a "...very, very new and also very, very old, as will be seen from the detailed construction illustrations below..." In his critique of the Brush, Dolnar was referencing the decision to use wooden axles.

In addition to the Runabout, Brush advertised a $600 "Package Car" (also advertised as the "Delivery Car") based on the same chassis as the runabout. Also offered was a "Coupe" model for $850. It is unknown how many (if any at all) of these models were ever produced or sold by Brush.

According to an in-house advertisement, 20,000 vehicles had already been produced from 1906 to May 1909.

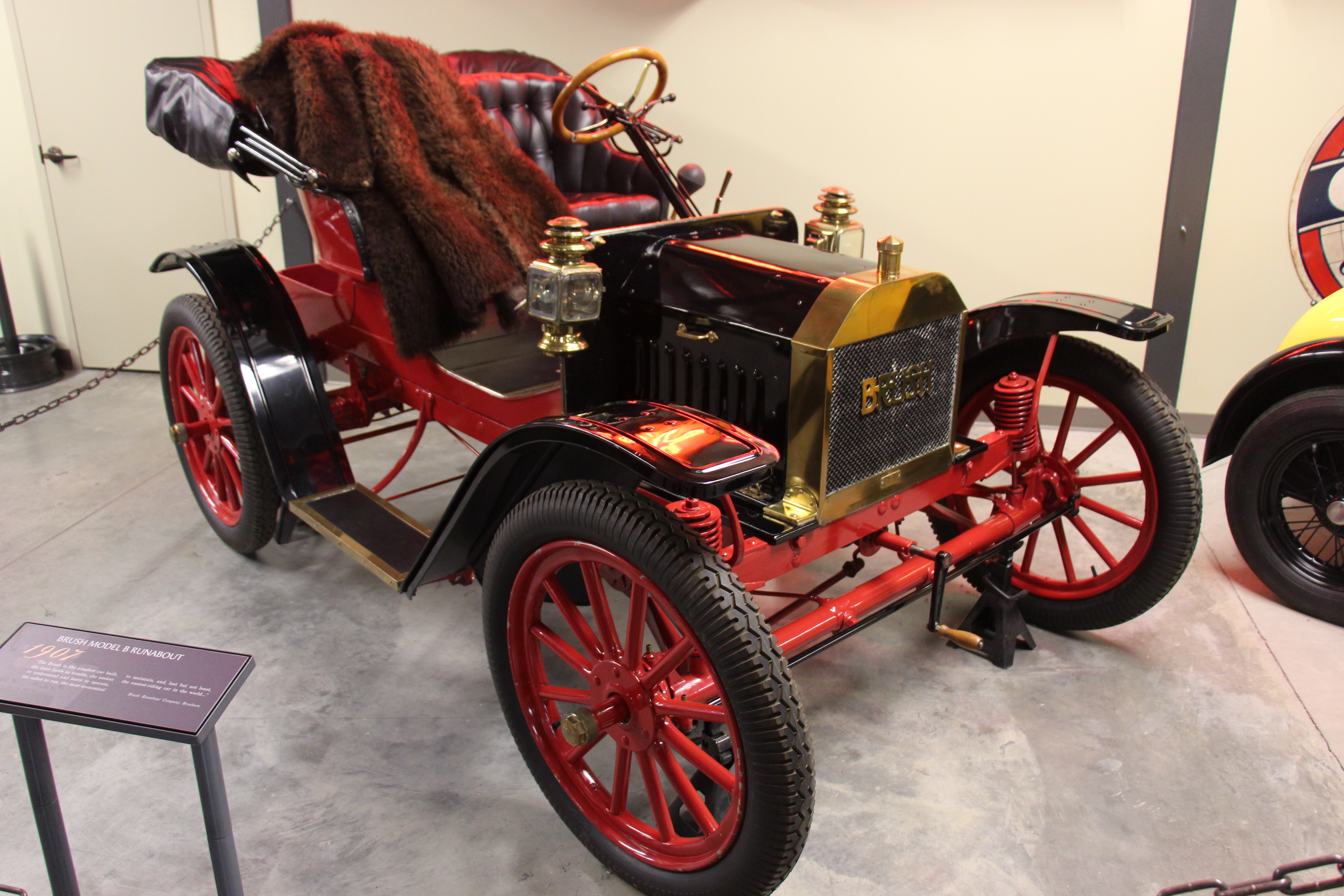
1907 Brush Model B Runabout

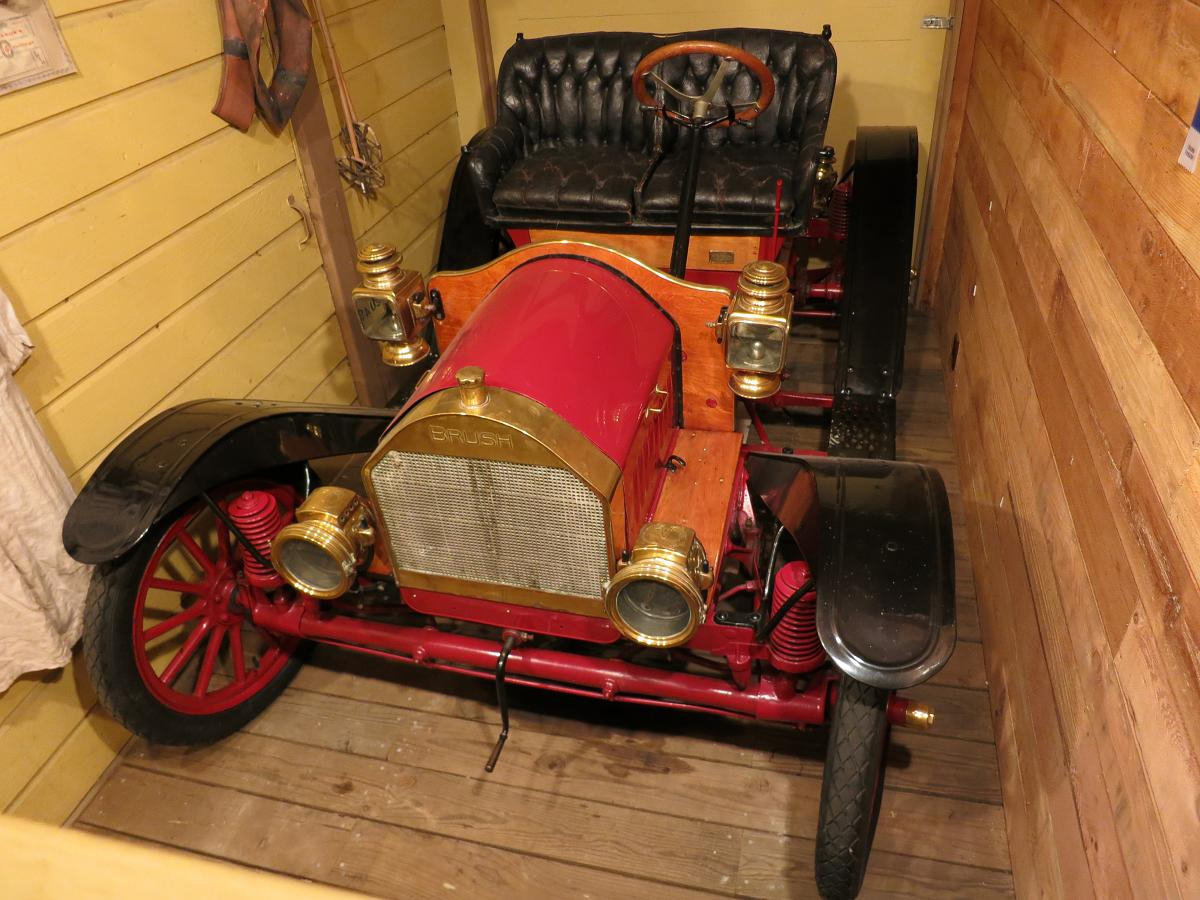
1909 Brush automobile, housed in the Linn County Historical Museum in Brownsville, Oregon.

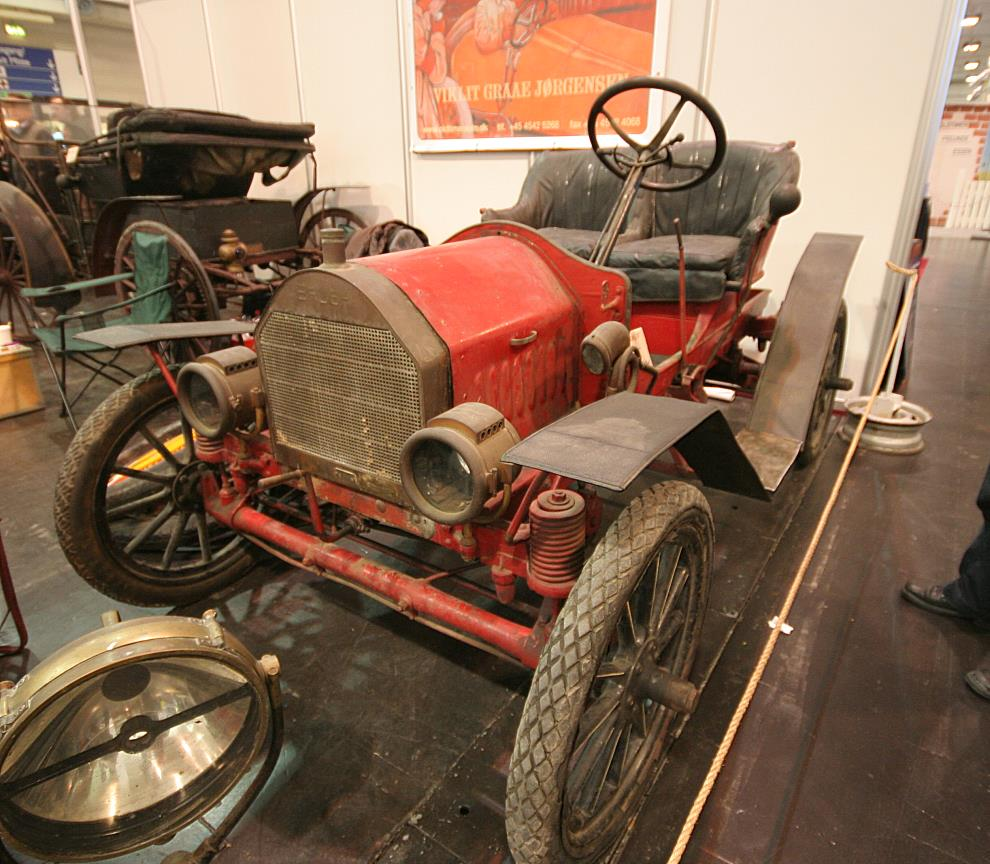
1910 Runabout

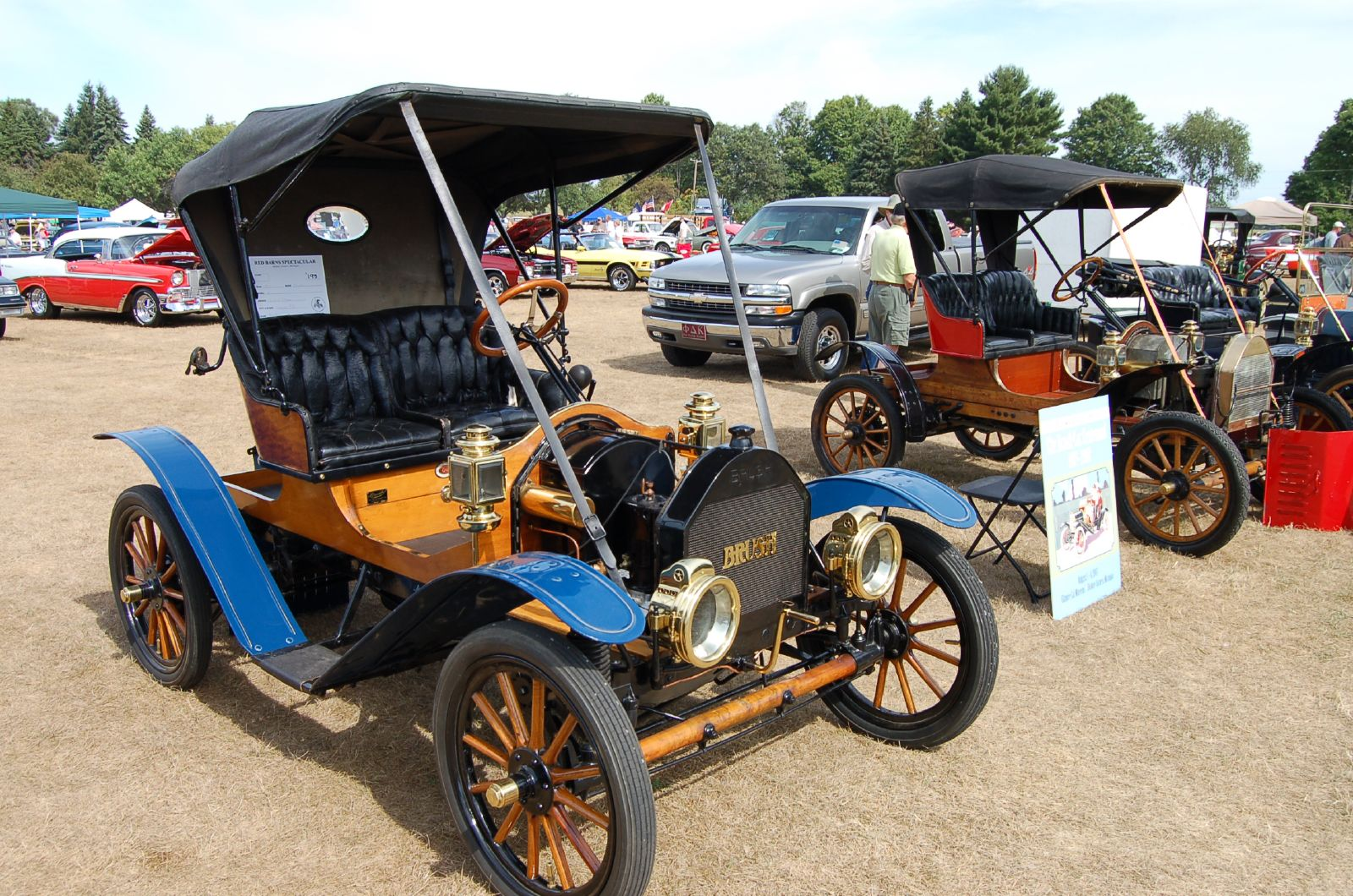
1911 Brush Model F

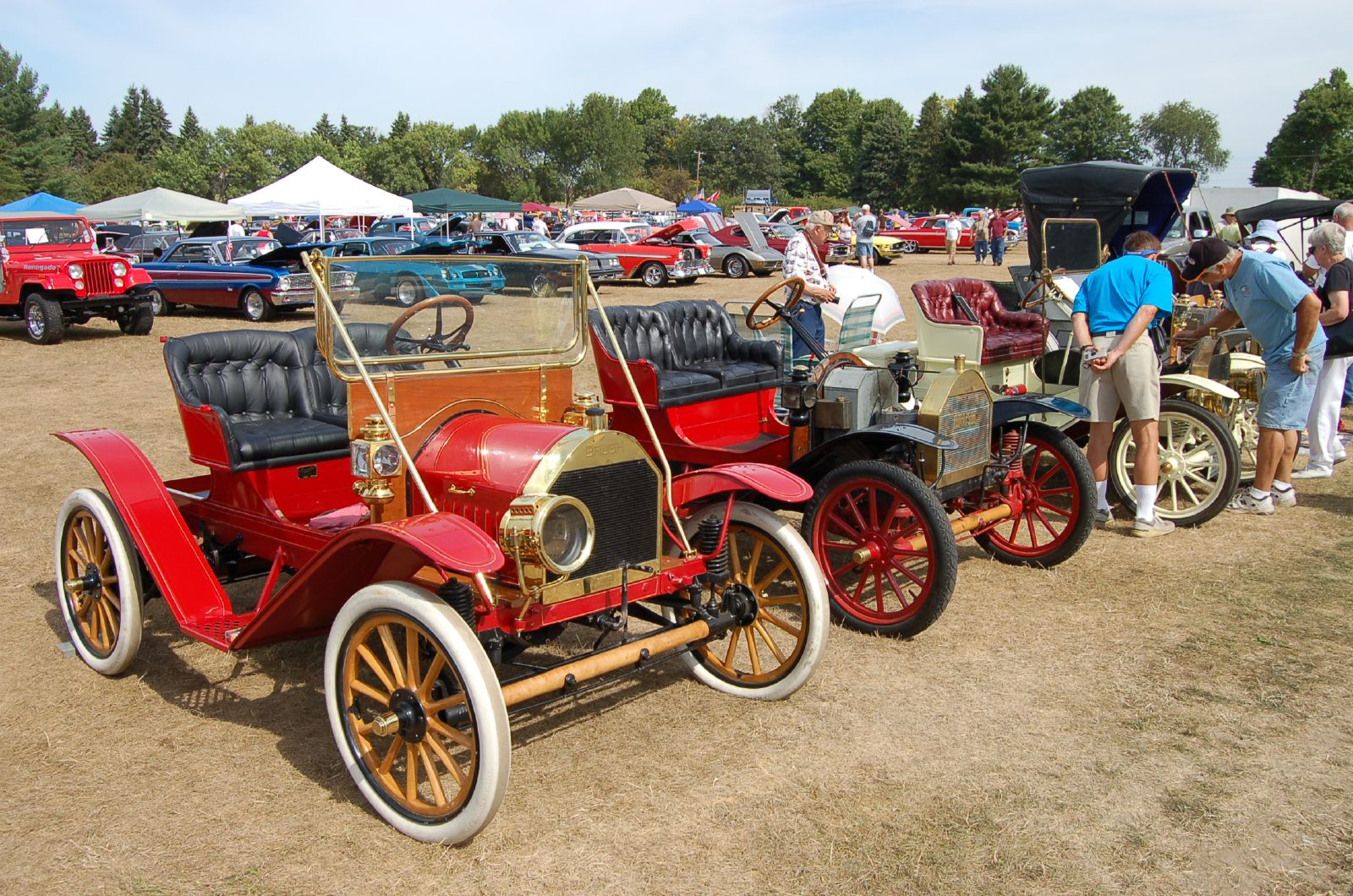
A bevy of Brushes

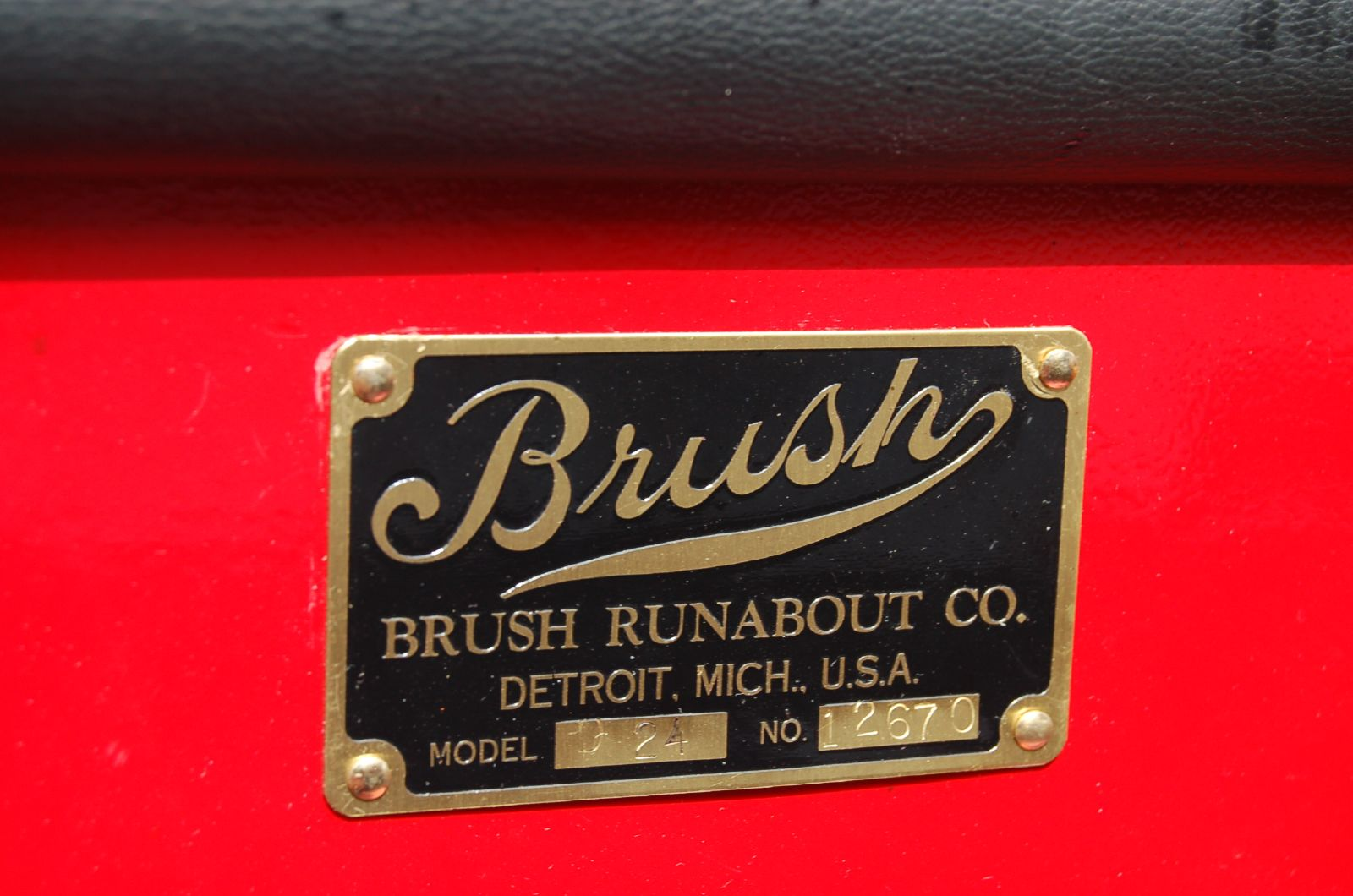
Brush ID Plate

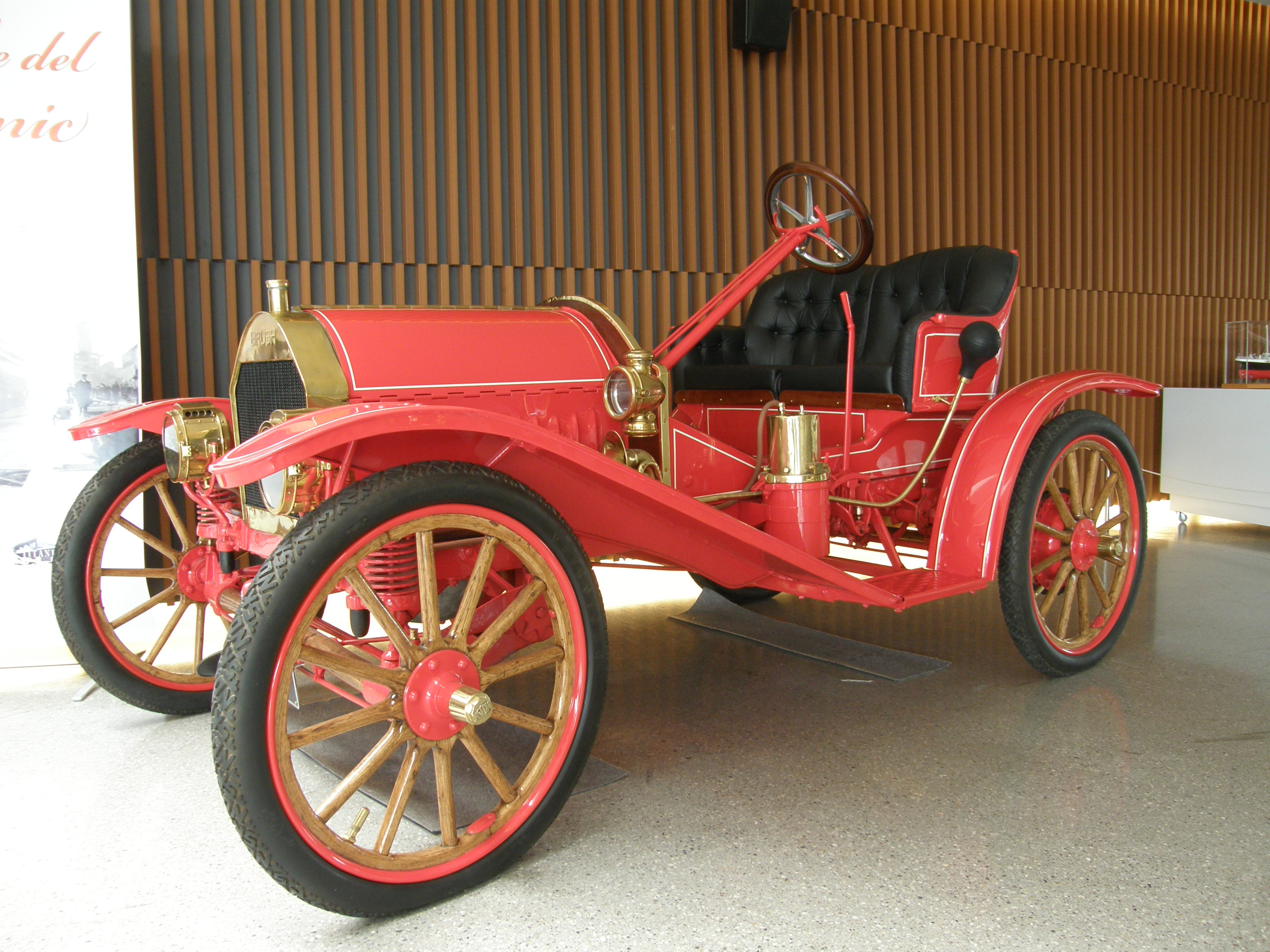
Brush runabout D24 Two-seat

=== Liberty-Brush ===
In order to increase sales, Brush introduced a lower priced version of the car. Sold between 1911 and 1912, the Liberty-Brush was a simplified version of the standard Runabout offered at a lower price. The most distinguishing feature between the two models were the fenders: the Brush had sweeping front and rear fenders that connected at the midpoint of the car in a short running board, whereas the Liberty-Brush had four bicycle type fenders over only the wheels. While the standard Brush sold in the $450 - $850 range, the Liberty-Brush was extensively advertised at a $350 price.

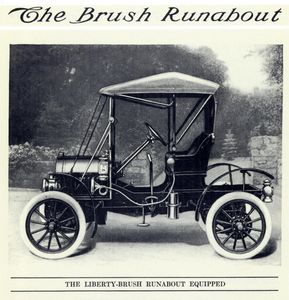
1912 Liberty-Brush Runabout

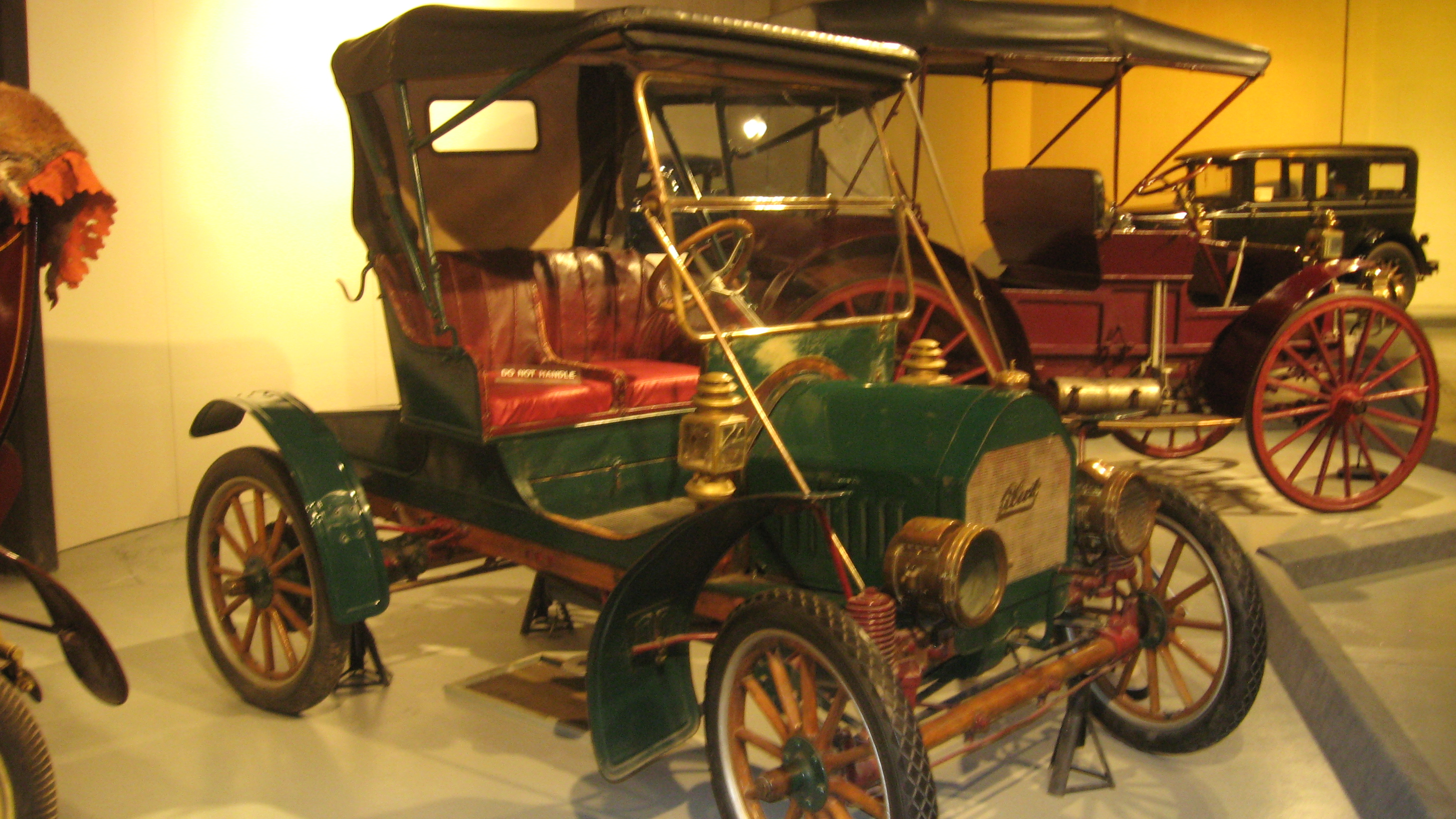
1912 Liberty-Brush Runabout, owned by a resident of Leinan, Saskatchewan, on display at the Western Development Museum in Saskatoon

== Feats of Endurance ==
Pikes Peak In 1908, Fred and Florence Trinkle took their 7BHP Brush Runabout. It was the third car to make it to the top of Pikes Peak under its own power. The trip to the top of Pikes Peak was part of the Trinkle's "Across America" trip, covering 2,340 miles.

Glidden Tour In 1909, two Brush Runabouts participated in the Glidden Tour. Neither Brush successfully completed the tour.

Abernathy Boys In 1910, Louis and Temple Abernathy aged 10 and 6, rode their horses to see former President Theodore Roosevelt at a celebration. The two boys convinced their father to return to Oklahoma via automobile, and the trio purchased a 1910 Brush Runabout for the trip. Their return trip included stops in Albany, NY, Niagara Falls, Detroit (and a stop at the Brush Factory for a tune-up), Chicago and Omaha. Brush used the "Little Cowboys from Oklahoma" in their advertisements.

Trans-Australian Trip In 1912, Sid Ferguson, Francis Birtles and a dog named Rex drove a Brush Runabout across the Australian continent. The pair started out on the west coast in Freemantle and ending on the east coast in Sydney, with the trip occurring between March and April of that year. Ferguson and Birtles became the first persons to successfully undertake such a trip.

== Extant Examples on Display ==
- 1907 Runabout (restored) is on display at the Fondation Pierre Gianadda Museum, Martigny, Switzerland
- 1908 Model BC Runabout is on display at Fountainhead Antique Auto Museum in Fairbanks, AK.
- 1908 Runabout (restored) at the Old Rhinebeck Aerodrome
- 1909 Runabout (restored) is on display at the Linn County Historical Museum in Brownsville, Oregon.
- 1909 "Gentleman's Runabout" is on display at the Gilmore Car Museum in Hickory Corners, MI.
- 1910 Runabout (original) is on display at the Swigart Antique Auto Museum in Huntingdon, PA.
- 1911 Runabout (restored) on display at the Miles Through Time Automotive Museum in Toccoa, GA.
- 1912 Liberty-Brush Runabout (restored) is in storage at the Smithsonian National Museum of American History.
- 1912 Liberty-Brush Runabout (restored) is in the collections of the Museum of Transport and Technology in Point Chevalier, Auckland, NZ.

== See also ==
- Brass Era car
- Chalmers Motors
- List of defunct United States automobile manufacturers
- List of car brands
- United States Motor Company
- Not to be confused with Brush Electric Company nor Brush Traction (United Kingdom company)
- Francis Birtles
- Detroit Public Library has extensive photos of Brush and Liberty-Brush vehicles
- Chrysler Corporation
- Maxwell Motors
