= Ajax (1913 automobile) =

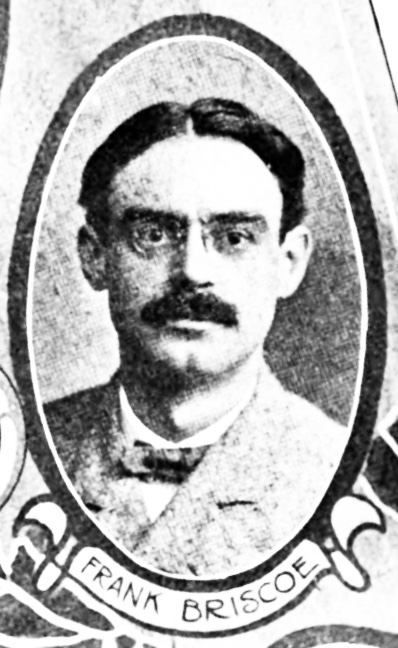
Frank Briscoe

The Ajax was a French automobile built by the American Briscoe brothers, Benjamin and Frank, between 1913 and 1919. Originally built in Neuilly, it was a 12 hp cyclecar with 980 cc 4-cylinder engine with friction drive. It sold for £78.

Production continued after the brothers returned to the United States where they built the Argo car, which was similar to the Ajax, differing in the inclusion of a more conventional transmission.

== See also ==
- La page retraçant la carrière des frères Briscoe sur le cimetière des marques (in French)
