= Briscoe (automobile company) =

Defunct American motor vehicle manufacturer

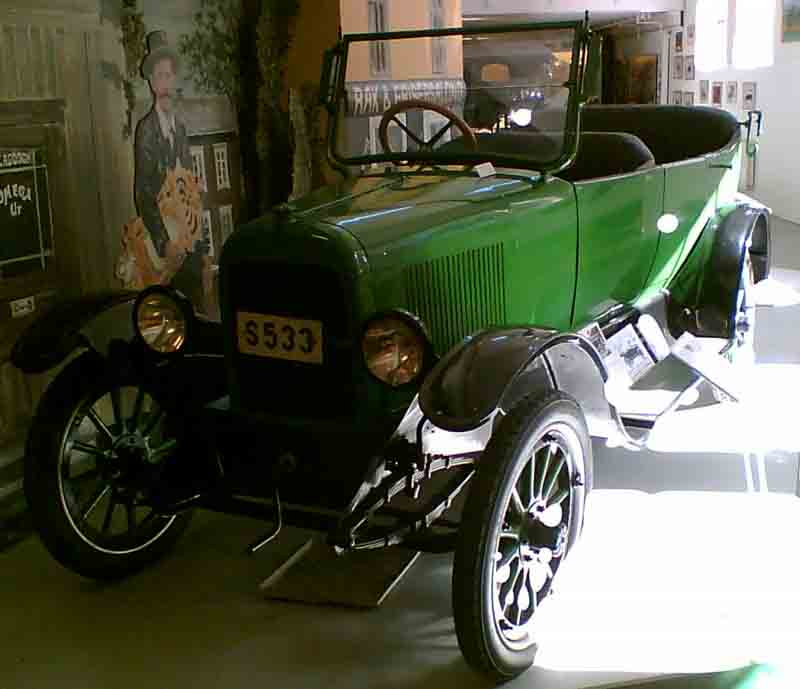
Briscoe Model B 4/24 Touring 1919

The Briscoe was an American automobile manufactured at Jackson, Michigan, by a group headed by Benjamin Briscoe. Briscoe cars were made between 1914 and 1921.

A few months after his departure from the United States Motor Company in 1913, Benjamin Briscoe established a plant at Billancourt, France to design and manufacture the first automobile in France built by American methods. The business was called Briscoe Freres; Billancourt was the home of Renault.

In 1915, Briscoe offered what he called "The First French Car at an American Price." Briscoe claimed that the auto had been designed by a French design studio. It featured a single headlamp in the front, faired into the radiator shell. The auto was priced at US$750.00 but this price did not include a top, windshield, or starter.

The company also produced the Argo, the Hackett, and the Lorraine.

== Production ==
Year	Production figures	Production according to Seltzer, Lawrence H.
1914	4.938	
1915	7.093	
1916	8.149	7.100
1917	8.036	8.100
1918	8.193	9.400
1919	10.237	11.000
1920	6.120	6.000
1921	4.175	3.000
1922		4.600
1923		1.600
Sum	56.941	50.800
