= Courier Car Co =

Defunct American motor vehicle manufacturer

The Courier Car Co. was an automobile manufacturer formed in 1909 by the Stoddard-Dayton Company in Dayton, Ohio, to produce smaller, lighter and lower-priced models than the luxury automobiles produced by Stoddard Dayton.

Its advertisements were early advocates of the compact car: "Don't buy more car than you need ... Don't you buy a car of greater power or capacity than you need." The cars were built on a 100-inch (2,500 mm) wheelbase and powered by a 22.5 horsepower (16.8 kW) engine. Four-cylinder models (3245 cc and 3638 cc) were produced.

The car was comparable in size to the Ford Model T, but had three forward gears to Ford's two and the Courier was a snappier performer. Only two body styles were offered: an open, four-passenger touring car and a sporty, two-seater sportster.

Like Stoddard-Dayton, Courier formed part in the United States Motor Company. After the acquisition by United States Motors, the 1912 models were called Courier Clermonts. Production ceased in 1913, when United States Motor Company failed.

The Courier plant occupied what had been the Kinsey Manufacturing building on the southwest corner of Wayne Avenue and State Street (now Fourth Street), which now houses the Dayton Plumbing Supply Co.

The discovery and restoration of a Courier is featured in a chapter of Ralph Steubenrauch's classic book The Fun of Old Cars.

== Production models ==
- Courier 2,5 t Truck
