= Maxwell Motor Company =

Former American car manufacturer (1904 - 1925)

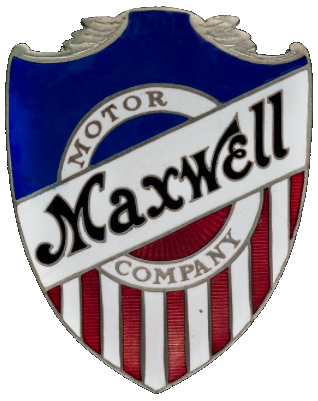
- Formerly: Maxwell-Briscoe Company
- Industry: Automobile
- Predecessor: USMC
- Founded: 1904; 122 years ago
- Founders: Jonathan Dixon Maxwell; Benjamin Briscoe
- Defunct: 1925; 101 years ago
- Fate: Acquired by Walter Chrysler, merged into Chrysler Corp.
- Successor: Chrysler (Stellantis)
- Headquarters: Tarrytown, New York and Detroit, Michigan, U.S.

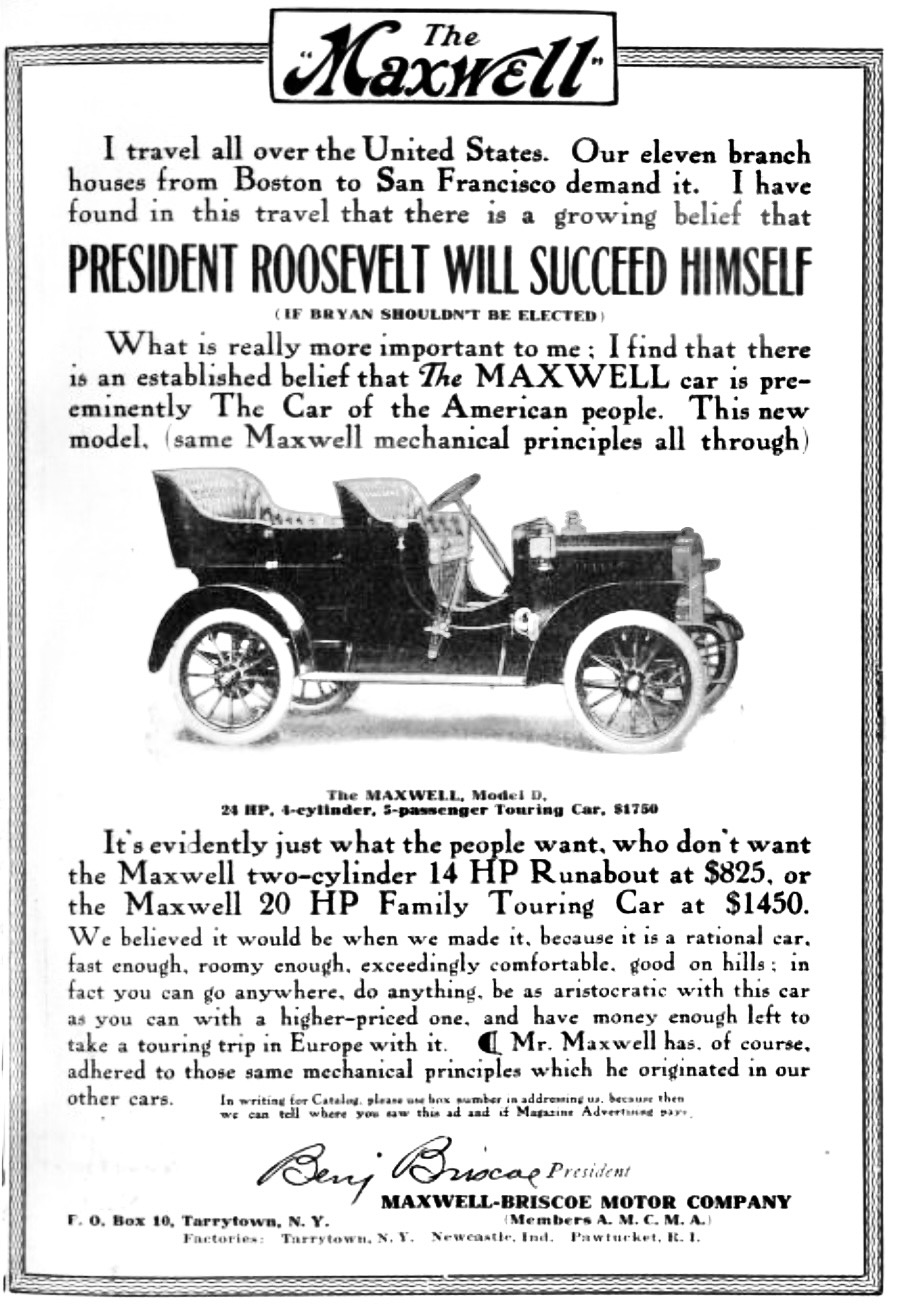
Maxwell Model D (1908) 24 hp

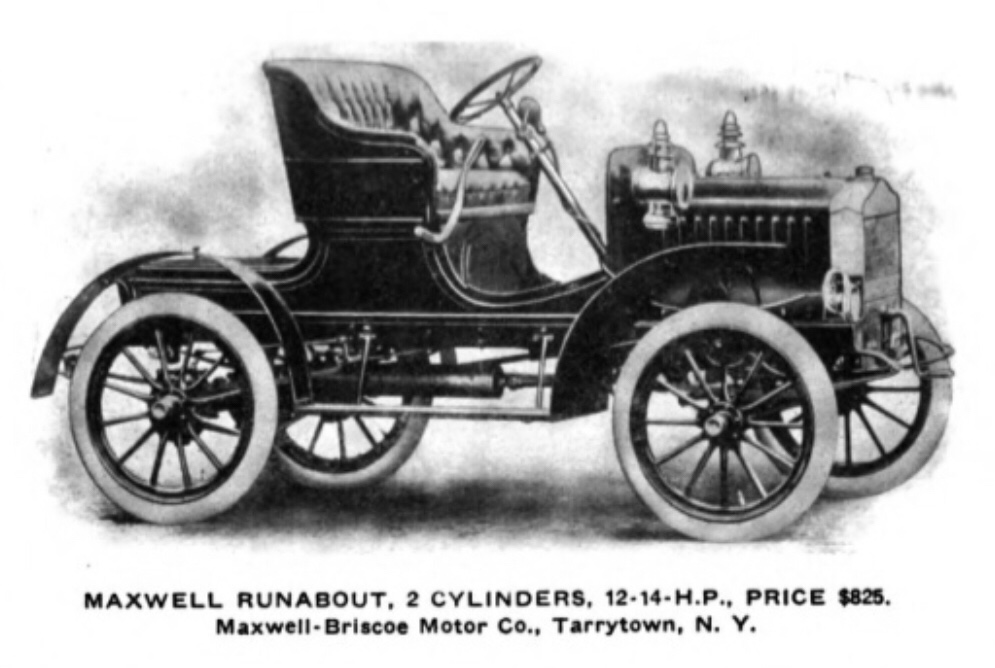
Maxwell Model LC (1908)

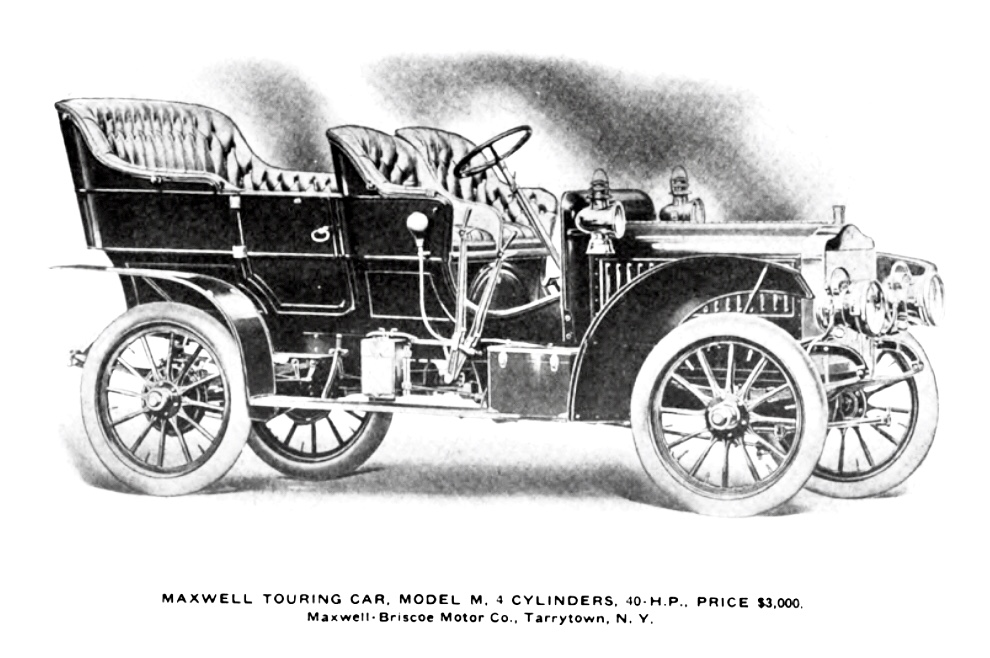
Maxwell Model M (1908)

Maxwell Plant Highland Park (1915)

Maxwell was an American automobile manufacturer which ran from 1904 to 1925. The present-day successor to the Maxwell company was Chrysler, now Stellantis North America, which acquired the company in 1925.

== History ==
=== Maxwell-Briscoe Company ===
Maxwell automobile production began under the "Maxwell-Briscoe Company" of North Tarrytown, New York. The company was named after founder Jonathan Dixon Maxwell, who earlier had worked for Oldsmobile, and his business partner, Benjamin Briscoe, an automobile industry pioneer and part owner of the Briscoe Brothers Metalworks. Briscoe was president of Maxwell-Briscoe at its height.

In 1907, following a fire that destroyed the North Tarrytown, NY, factory, Maxwell-Briscoe opened a mammoth automobile factory at 1817 I Ave, New Castle, Indiana. The newspapers reported that the factory "will operate as a whole, like an integral machine, the raw material going in at one end of the plant and the finished cars out the other end." This factory continued as a Chrysler plant following its takeover of Maxwell until its demolition in 2004.

For a time, Maxwell was considered one of the three top automobile firms in America, along with General Motors and Ford. (though the phrase "the Big Three" was not used at the time). Maxwell was the only profitable company of the combine named United States Motor Company, which was formed in 1910. Due to a conflict between two of its backers, the United States Motor Company collapsed in 1913 after the failure of its last supporting car manufacturer, the Brush Motor Company. Maxwell was the only survivor.

=== Maxwell Motor Company, Inc. ===
The company responded to the increasing number of low-priced cars—including the $600 Ford Model N, the high-volume Oldsmobile Runabout at $650, the $485 Brush Runabout, the Black at $375, the $500 Western Gale Model A, and the Success which was priced at a low $250—by introducing the Model 25, their cheapest four yet. At $695, this five-seat touring car had high-tension magneto ignition, electric horn and (optional) electric starter and headlights, and a shock absorber to protect the radiator.

By 1913, the Maxwell assets were overseen by Walter Flanders, who reorganized the company as the "Maxwell Motor Company, Inc." The company moved to Highland Park, Michigan. Some of the Maxwells were also manufactured at three plants in Dayton, Ohio. By 1914, Maxwell had sold 60,000 cars.

== Production models ==
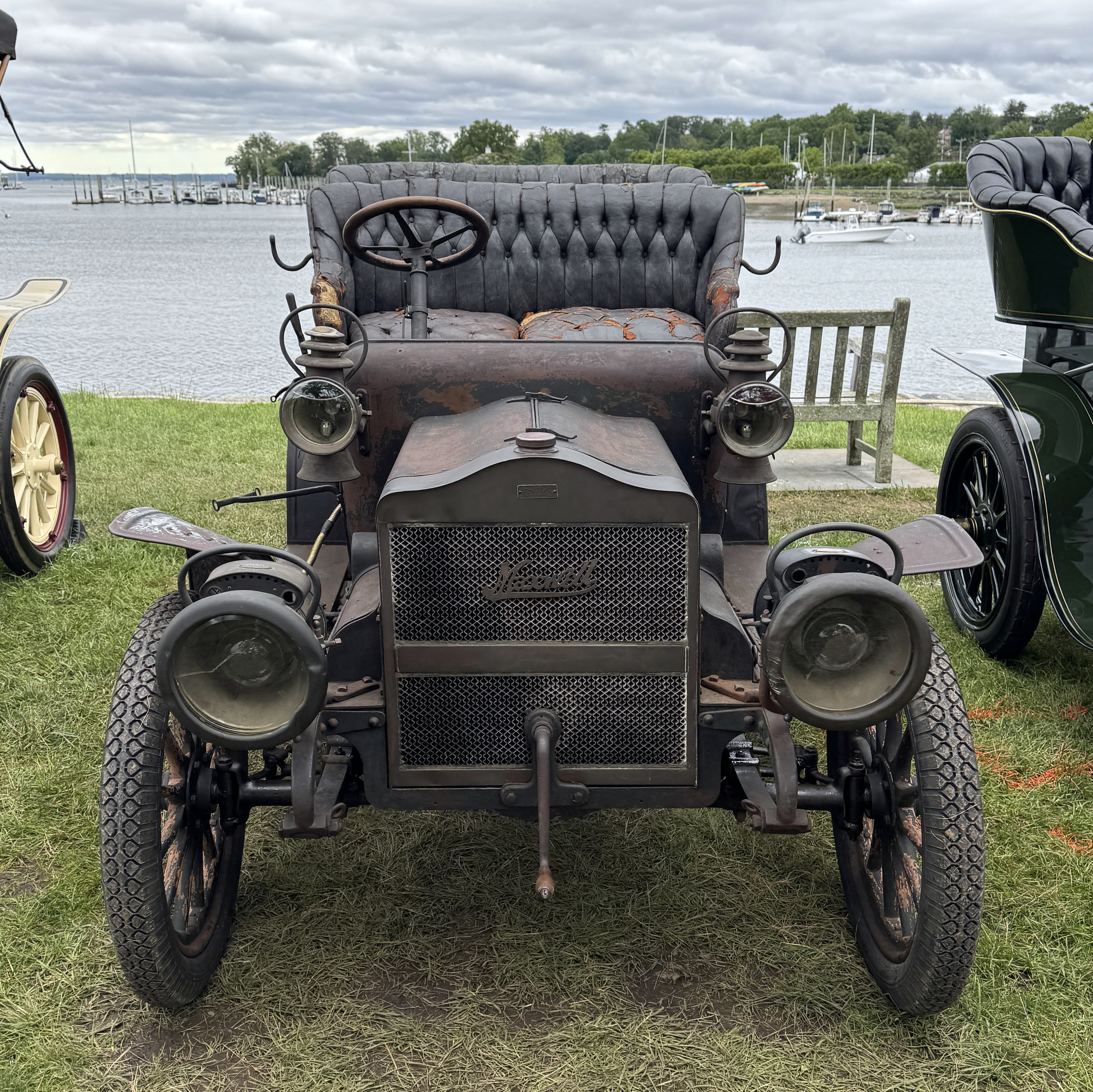
1905 Maxwell Model H; unrestored in appearance

- Maxwell Model D
- Maxwell Model E
- Maxwell Model G
- Maxwell Model H
- Maxwell Model L
- Maxwell Model M
- Maxwell Model Q3
- Maxwell Model Q2
- Maxwell Model Q1
- Maxwell Model Q Standard
- Maxwell Model Q 4
- Maxwell Model AA
- Maxwell Model G A
- Maxwell Model E A
- Maxwell Model I
- Maxwell Model A B

=== Takeover by Walter Chrysler ===
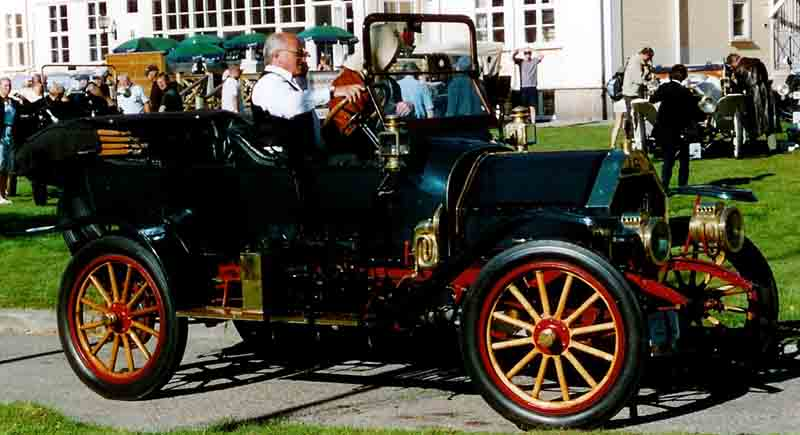
Maxwell Mascotte Touring 1911

Maxwell eventually over-extended and wound up deeply in debt, with over half of its production unsold in the post-World War I recession in 1920. The following year, Walter P. Chrysler arranged to take a controlling interest in Maxwell Motors, subsequently re-incorporating it in West Virginia with himself as the chairman. One of his first tasks was to correct the faults in the Maxwell, whose quality had faltered. This improved version of the car was marketed as the "good Maxwell".

Around the time of Chrysler's takeover, Maxwell was also in the process of merging, awkwardly at best, with the ailing Chalmers Automobile Company. Chalmers ceased production in late 1923.

=== Phase out ===
In 1925, Chrysler formed his own company, the Chrysler Corporation. That same year, the Maxwell line was phased out and the Maxwell company assets were absorbed by Chrysler. The Maxwell automobile would continue to live on in another form, because the new 4-cylinder Chrysler model that was introduced for the 1926 model year was created largely from the design of the previous year's Maxwell. This former Maxwell would undergo another transformation in 1928, when a second reworking and renaming would bring about the creation of the first Plymouth.

== Marketing to women ==
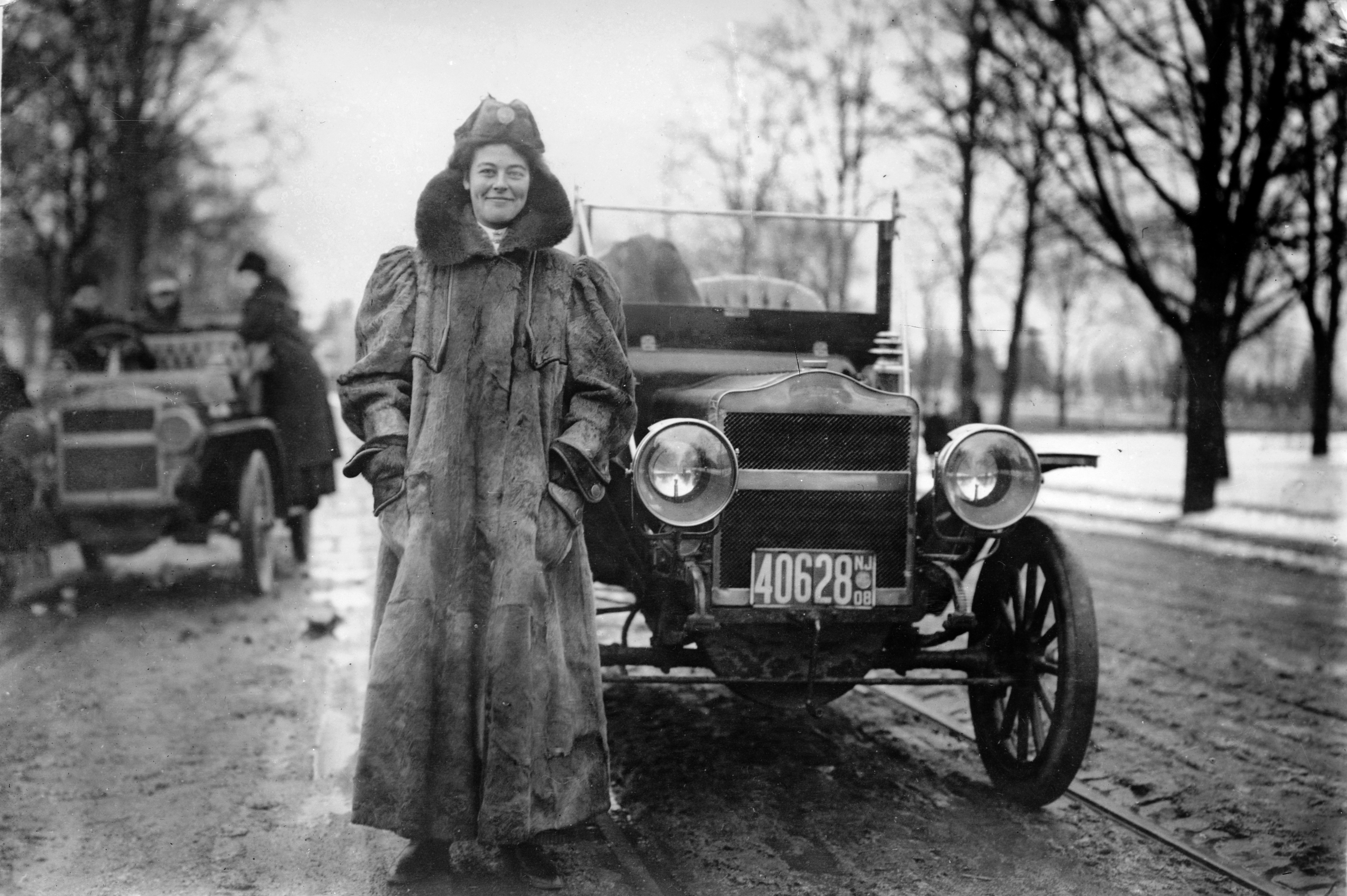
Racer Alice Huyler Ramsey posing beside her Maxwell

Maxwell was one of the first car companies to market specifically to women. In 1909, it generated a great deal of publicity when it sponsored Alice Huyler Ramsey, an early advocate of women drivers, as the first woman to drive coast-to-coast across the United States. By 1914, the company had strongly aligned itself with the women's rights movement. That year, it announced its plan to hire as many male sales personnel as female. At that time, it offered a promotional reception at its Manhattan dealership which featured several prominent suffragettes such as Crystal Eastman, while in a showroom window a woman assembled and disassembled a Maxwell engine in front of onlookers.

== In media ==
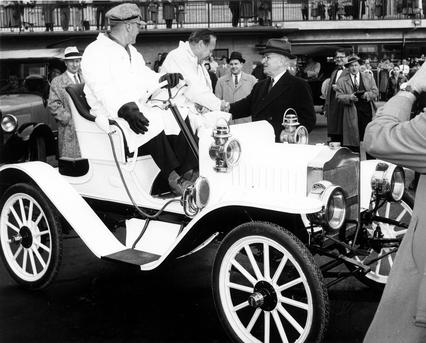
Comedian Jack Benny (shown here shaking hands with Harry S. Truman from the seat of a c. 1908 Maxwell Roadster) kept the Maxwell familiar in U.S. popular culture for half a century after the brand went out of business.

In 1920, the Maxwell Company contracted with actress and producer Nell Shipman to create a short promotional film featuring the Maxwell. She was able to stretch the money budgeted for the project into a multi-reel feature entitled Something New. The Maxwell's abilities were prominently featured in this melodramatic film, which had Nell Shipman and Bert Van Tuyle escaping a band of Mexican bandits by racing the sturdy little car across the Mexican badlands where they overcame obstacles such as boulders, rivers, gulches, and all other sorts of rough terrain. Maxwell dealers presented this motion picture at various venues to promote the car, often with the now-battered Maxwell on display. The Maxwell Company had assisted in the film's production by supplying a car and by deploying a mechanic to the filming location. The mechanic's job included repeatedly replacing the car's transmission, which kept getting torn up by the harsh desert landscape.

A decrepit old Maxwell was famous as the car Jack Benny drove, for decades after it had stopped being manufactured, on his long-running radio (and later TV) comedy series The Jack Benny Program. The running joke was that Benny was too stingy to buy himself a new car—or even a newer used car—as long as his old one still ran, however poorly. The sounds used for it initially were pre-recorded, but when a technical fault prevented one of the records from playing, voice actor Mel Blanc himself improvised the sounds of the sputtering car starting up. His performance was received well enough for him to continue that task permanently. In one gag from the show Rochester tells Benny that he reported to the police that the Maxwell had been stolen although he didn't make the report until three hours after the theft; when Jack asked why Rochester delayed so long, Rochester explained that it was because that was when he stopped laughing.

The gag of the Maxwell as Benny's car was used in the classic cartoon The Mouse That Jack Built. Many people erroneously assume that the antique automobile Jack Benny is seen driving during his cameo appearance in the 1962 comedy film It's a Mad, Mad, Mad, Mad World is a Maxwell; that car is, in fact, a 1931 Cadillac convertible coupe.

In the "Mr. Bevis" episode of The Twilight Zone, Bevis (Orson Bean) is talking to a police officer (William Schallert) about buying his wrecked 1924 Rickenbacker. The officer responds facetiously that he has his eye on a 1927 Maxwell, which is two years after the Maxwell company closed.

== See also ==
- Carl Breer
- List of defunct United States automobile manufacturers

== Bibliography ==
- Clymer, Floyd. Treasury of Early American Automobiles, 1877–1925. New York: Bonanza Books, 1950.
- Darke, Paul. "Chrysler: The Baby of the Big Three", in Northey, Tom, ed. World of Automobiles, Vol. 4, pp. 364–9. London: Orbis, 1974.
- Kimes, Beverly Rae, and Clark, Henry Austin Jr. Standard Catalog of American Cars, 1805–1942 (second edition). Krause Publications, Inc. 1989. ISBN 0-87341-111-0.
- Kimes, Beverly Rae, and Clark, Henry Austin Jr. Standard Catalog of American Cars, 1805–1942 (third edition). Krause Publications, Inc. 1996. ISBN 0-87341-428-4.
- Yanik, Anthony J. Maxwell Motor and the Making of the Chrysler Corporation. Detroit: Wayne State University Press, 2009. ISBN 9780814334232.
