= Columbia (automobile brand) =

American automobile manufacturer

- Industry: Automobile
- Founded: 1899
- Defunct: 1910 (marque continued by purchaser)
- Fate: Sold
- Headquarters: Hartford, Connecticut, United States
- Products: Vehicles

Columbia was an American brand of automobiles produced by a group of companies in the United States. They included the Pope Manufacturing Company of Hartford, Connecticut, the Electric Vehicle Company, and an entity of brief existence in 1899, the Columbia Automobile Company.

In 1908, the company was renamed the Columbia Motor Car Company and in 1910 was acquired by United States Motor Company. A different Columbia Motors existed from 1917 to 1924.

== Electric models ==
The 1904 'Columbia Brougham' was equipped with a tonneau. It could seat four passengers and sold for US$3,500. Twin electric motors were situated at the rear of the car. Similar 'Columbia' coupes, 'Columbia Hansom' cabs, or hansoms, were also produced for the same price. They could achieve 13 mph (21 km/h). A 'Columbia Victoria Phaeton' was priced at US$3,000, but was based on the same design.

The 'Columbia Surrey' and 'Columbia Victoria' were more traditional horseless carriages. Both used the same power system as the larger cars, with twin electric motors, but cost much less at US$1,500 and US$1,600, respectively.

At the bottom end of the range was the 'Columbia Runabout' car. Priced at just US$750, it used a single electric motor, with an Exide battery and Concord springs.

Columbia's basic runabout was typical of the time, resembling a horseless carriage, and was steered via a tiller. It cost US$850, US$200 more than the contemporary Curved Dash Oldsmobile. The 1,200-pound (540 kg), single bench seat vehicle had a wheelbase of 64 inches (1,600 mm), and rode on 30-inch (760 mm) wooden spoked wheels, with leather fenders. The drivetrain had clear evolutionary roots in Pope's bicycle business, driving the rear axle via a chain drive (typical of automobiles of the era), producing virtually the only operating noise. Between the motor and the chain drive was a transmission with three forward and two reverse speeds. Twenty batteries manufactured by Exide Batteries, also associated with Electric Vehicle Company, were placed above both axles in order to balance the weight. Brakes on both rear wheels featured a bell, which rang when the vehicle reached a full stop. Top speed was about 15 mph (24 km/h).

Besides the runabout, Columbia manufactured about 20 other models including taxis, police cars, and buses. The vehicles were most popular in cities, where relatively smooth roads made the electric motor, with its smoothness and silence, appear superior over the gasoline engine. It helped in urban areas that electrical supply for recharging was easily found within the runabout's 40-mile (64 km) range. Nevertheless, in 1903, a Columbia was driven 250 miles (400 km) from Boston to New York City in 23 hours. In keeping with this urban orientation, the Columbia was positioned as a high-end vehicle (even at a time when automobiles were very expensive), with its showroom across the street from the Metropolitan Opera House in New York.

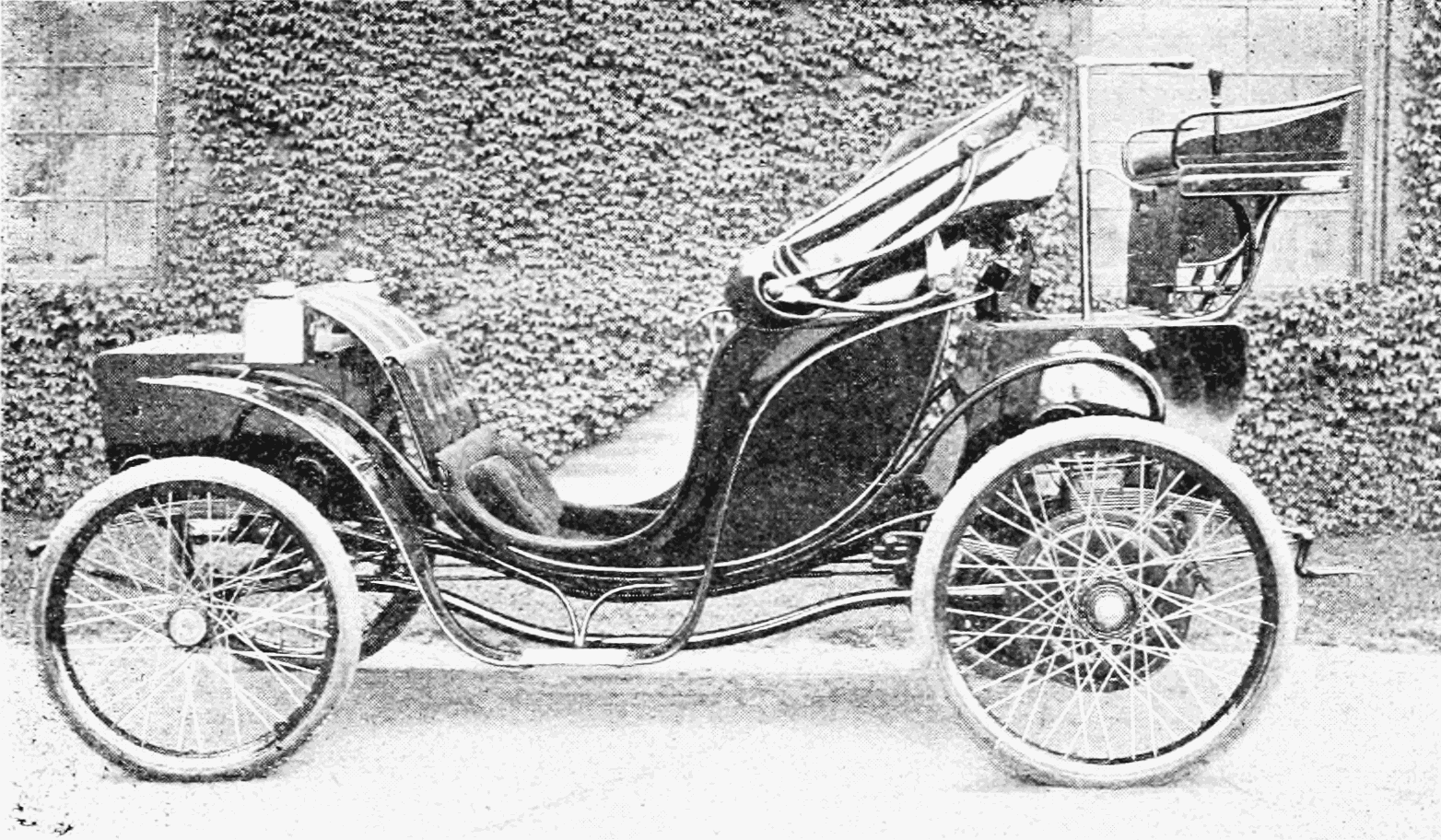
Columbia Victoria; this one seats the chauffeur high up behind passengers, although more typically, Victoria carriages mounted the driver's box in the front

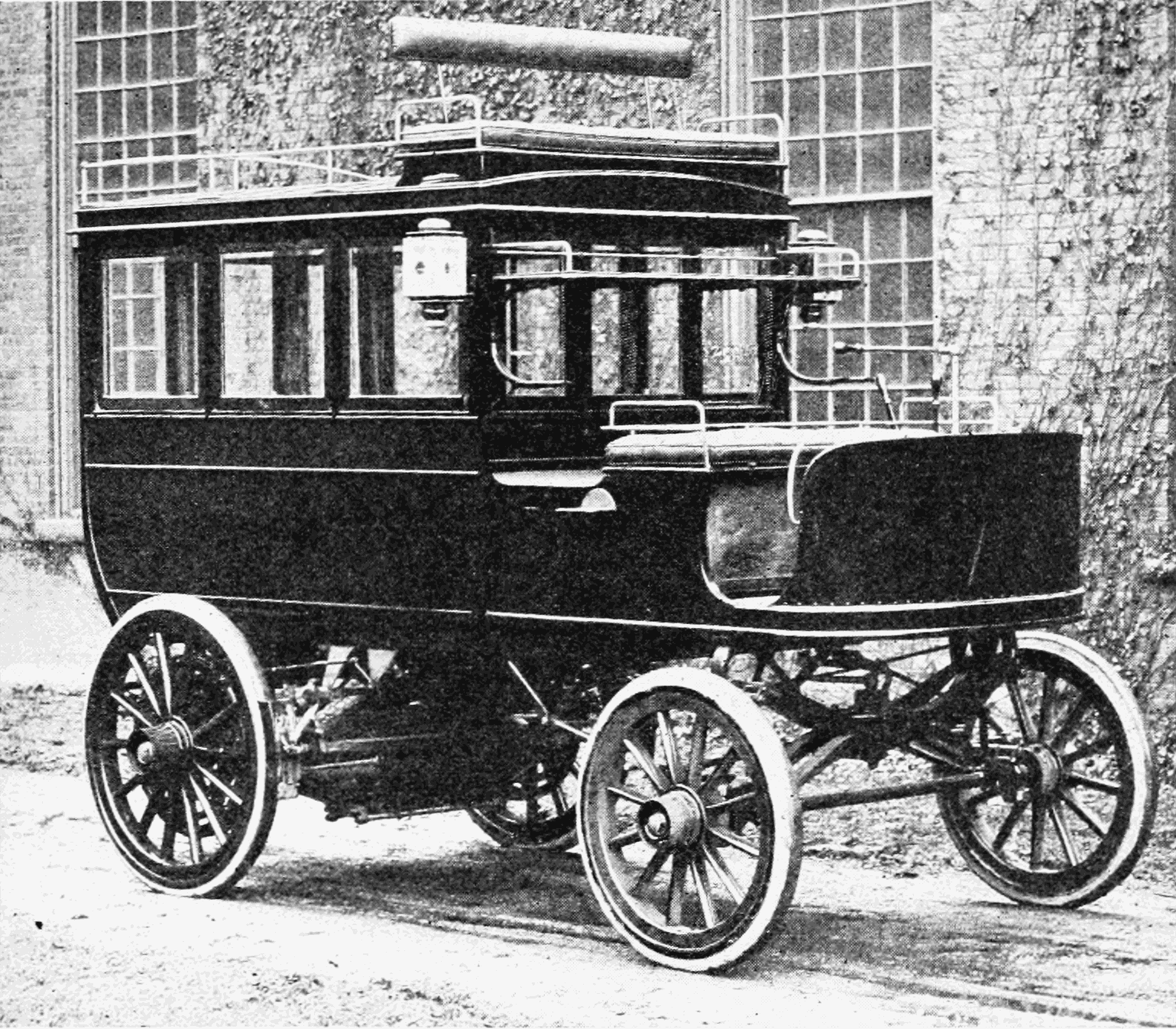
A Columbia omnibus

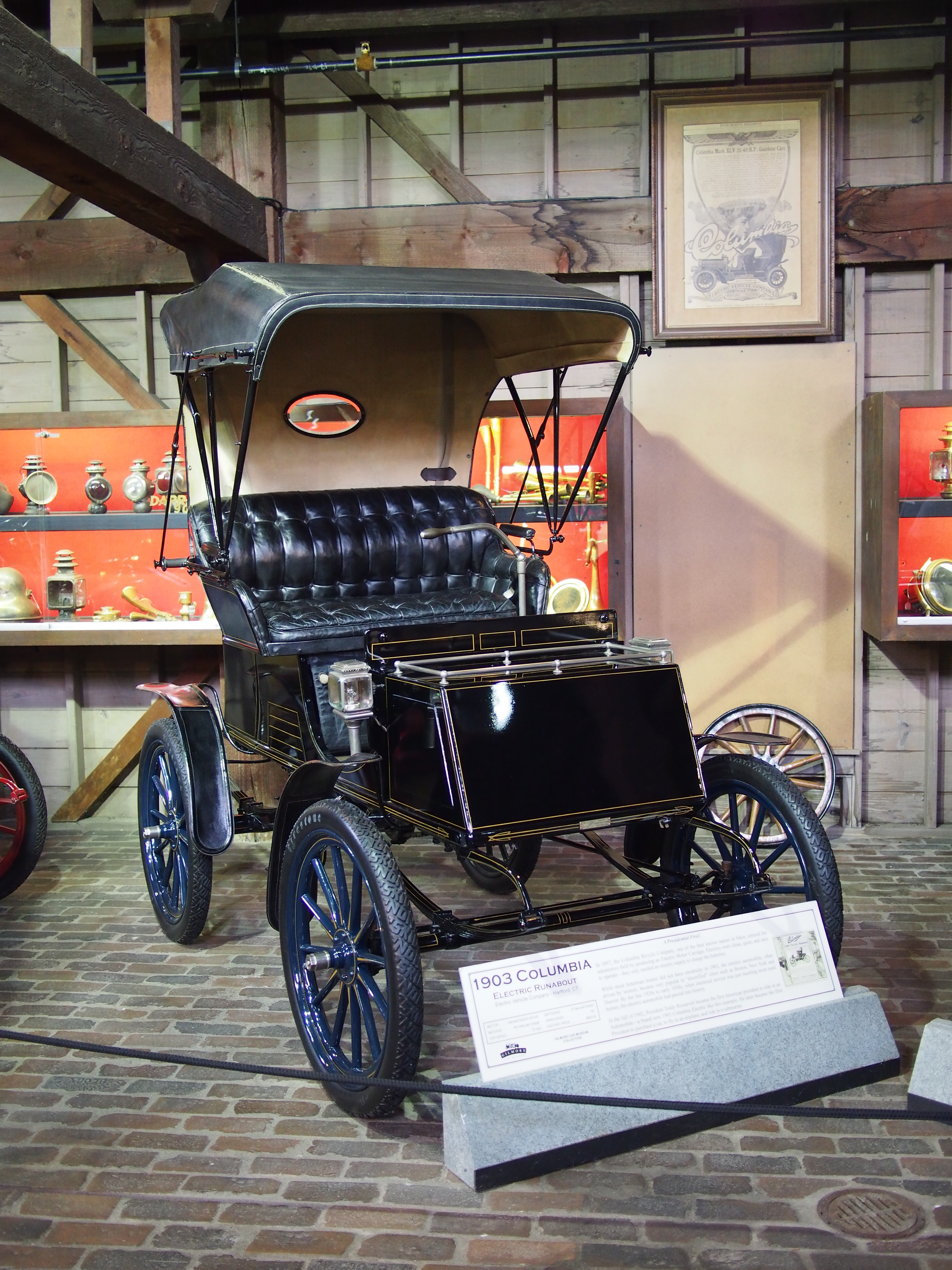
1903 Columbia Electric Runabout, the best-seller car in the U.S. in 1900 and the first to exceed 1000 sales

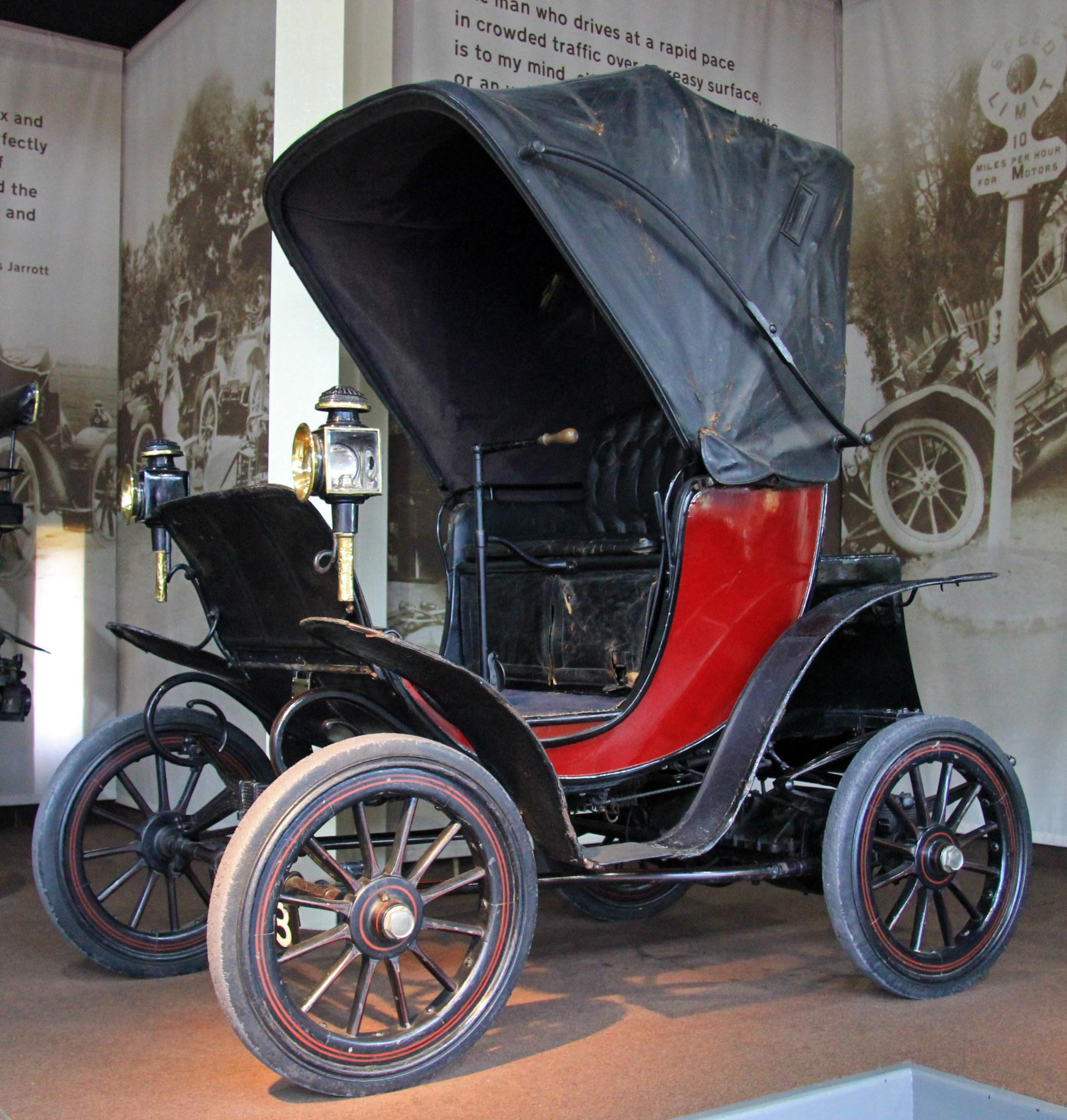
1901 Columbia Victoria Phaeton,
owned by Queen Victoria, for her daughter-in-law to drive where she wished

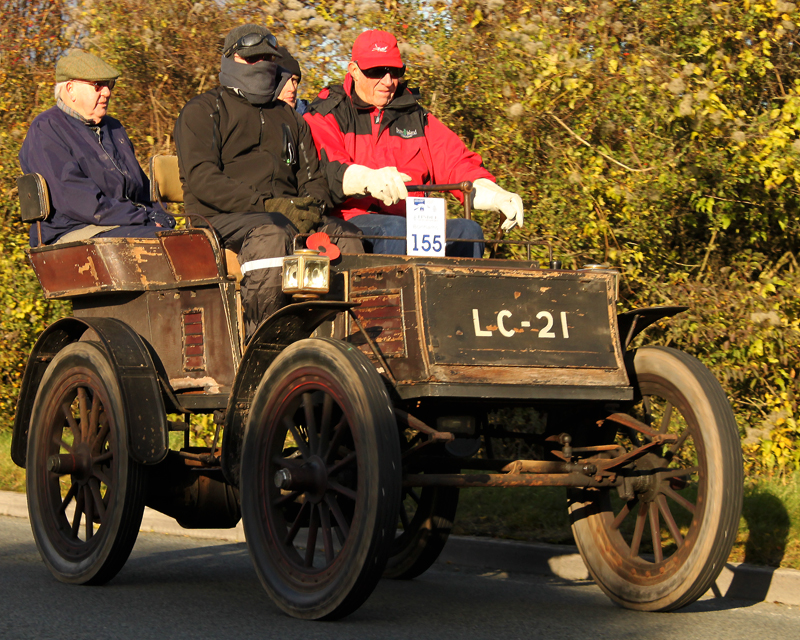
1900 Columbia electric 3¾HP rear-entrance tonneau

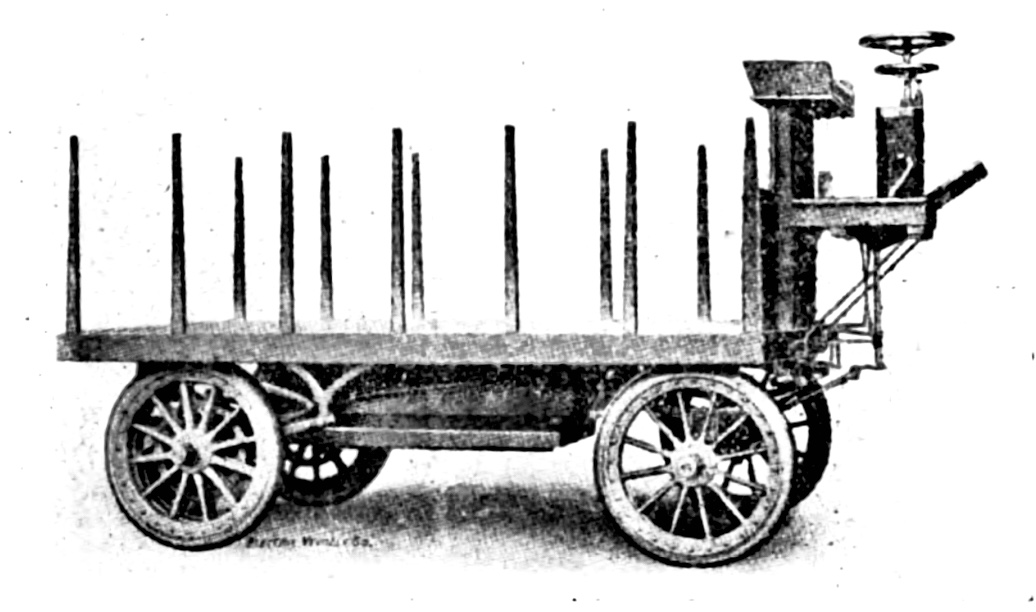
Columbia Electric Truck Model XXXIV (1903)

Columbia Model VIII (1901)

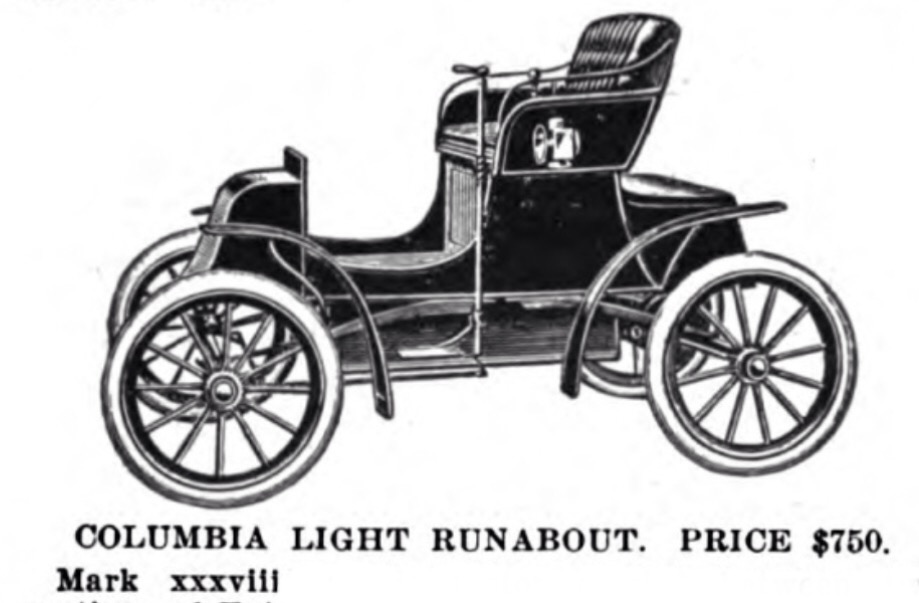
Columbia Model XXXVIII (1904)

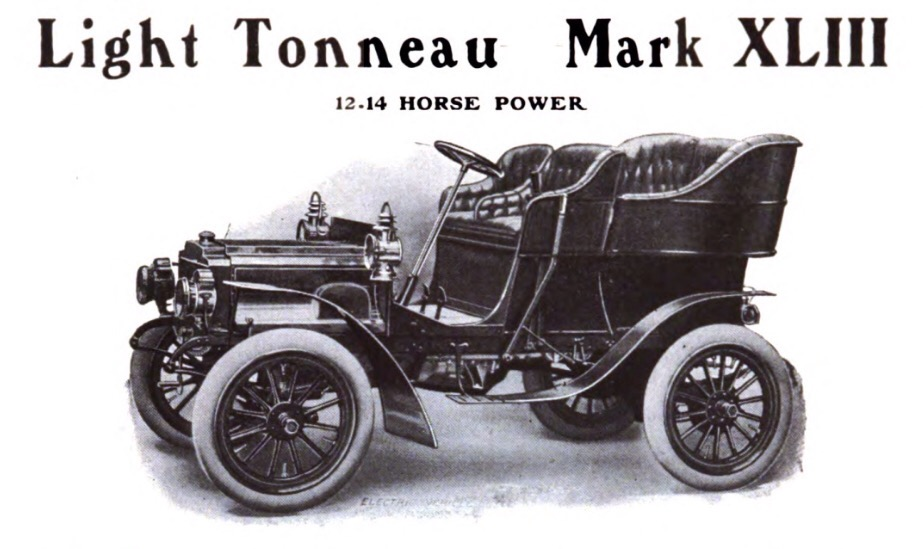
Columbia Model XLIII (1904)

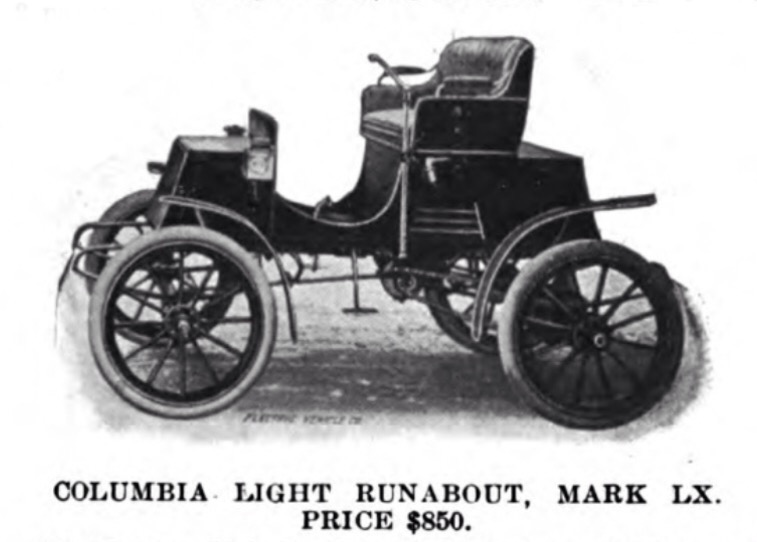
Columbia Model LX (1904)

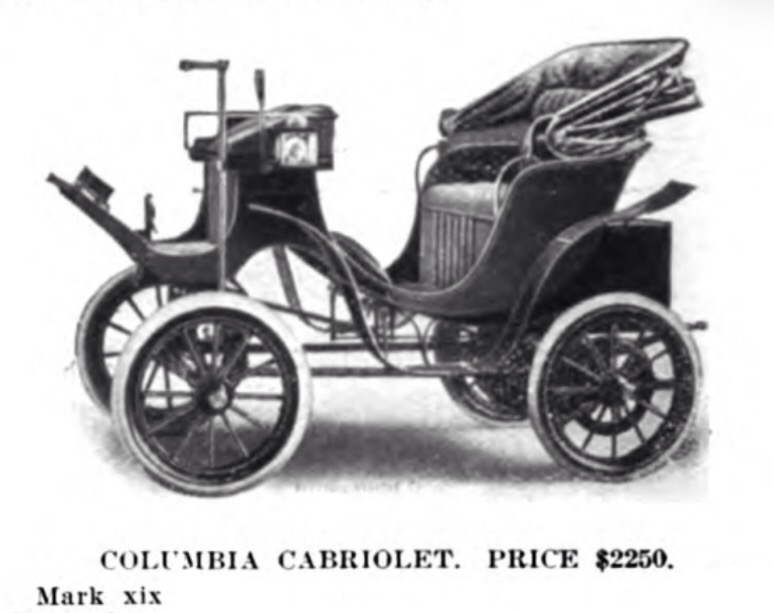
Columbia Model XIX (1904)

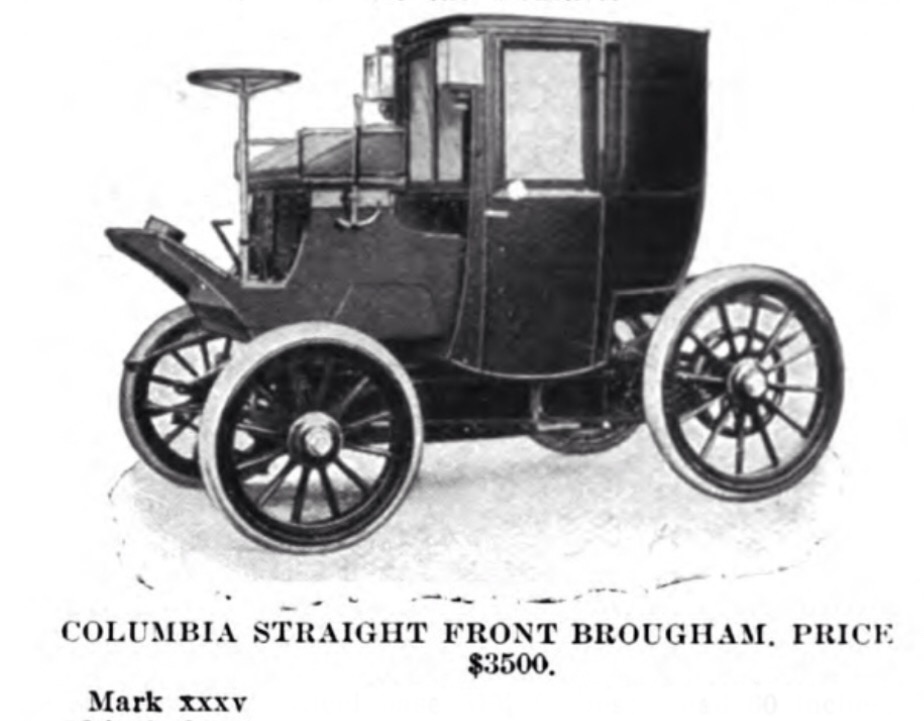
Columbia Model XXXV (1904)

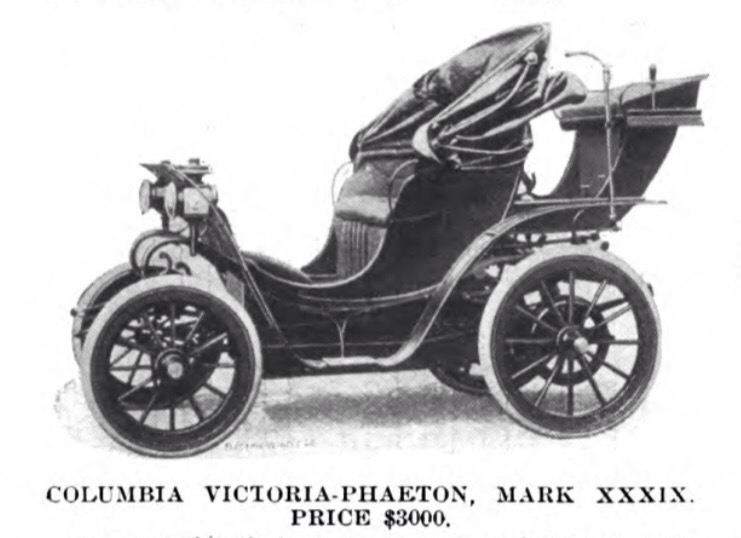
Columbia Model XXXIX (1904)

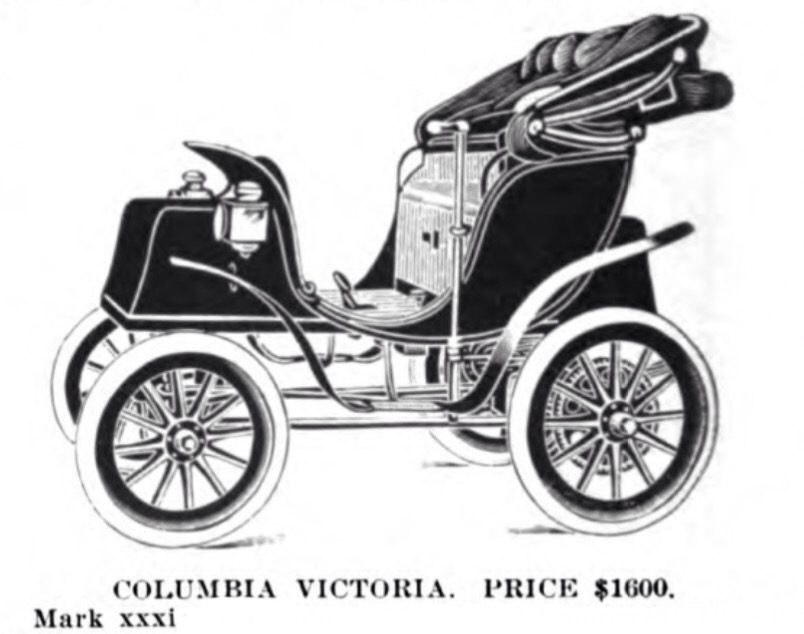
Columbia Model XXXI (1904)

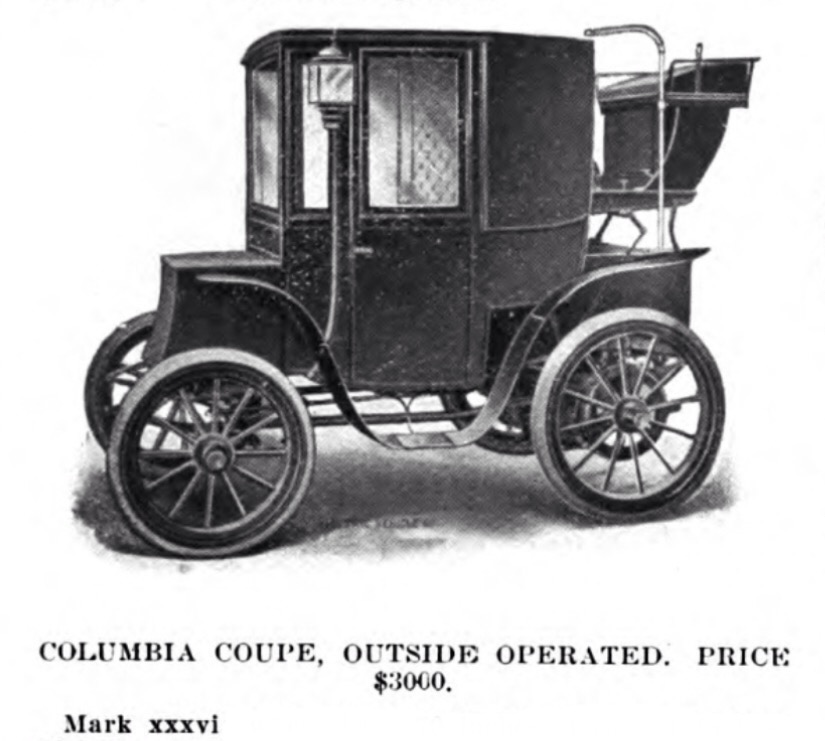
Columbia Model XXXVI (1904)

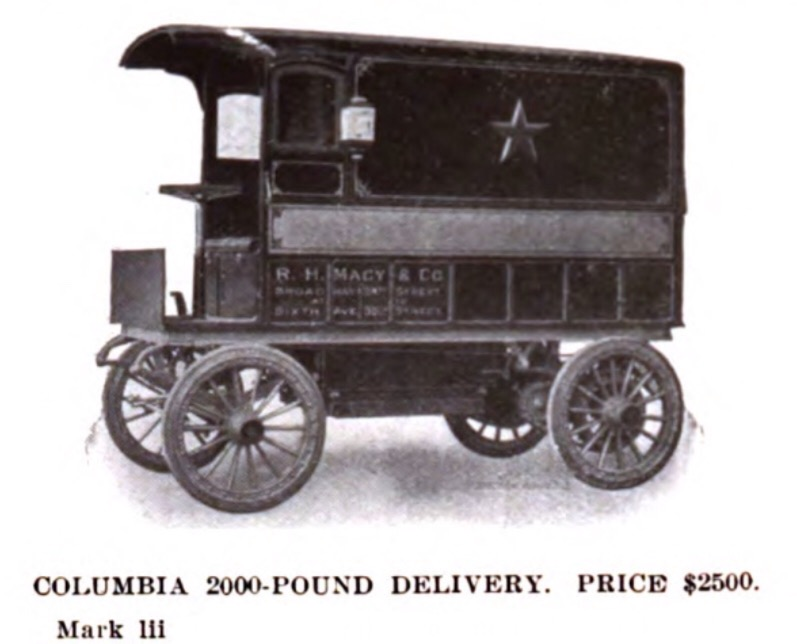
Columbia Model III (1904)

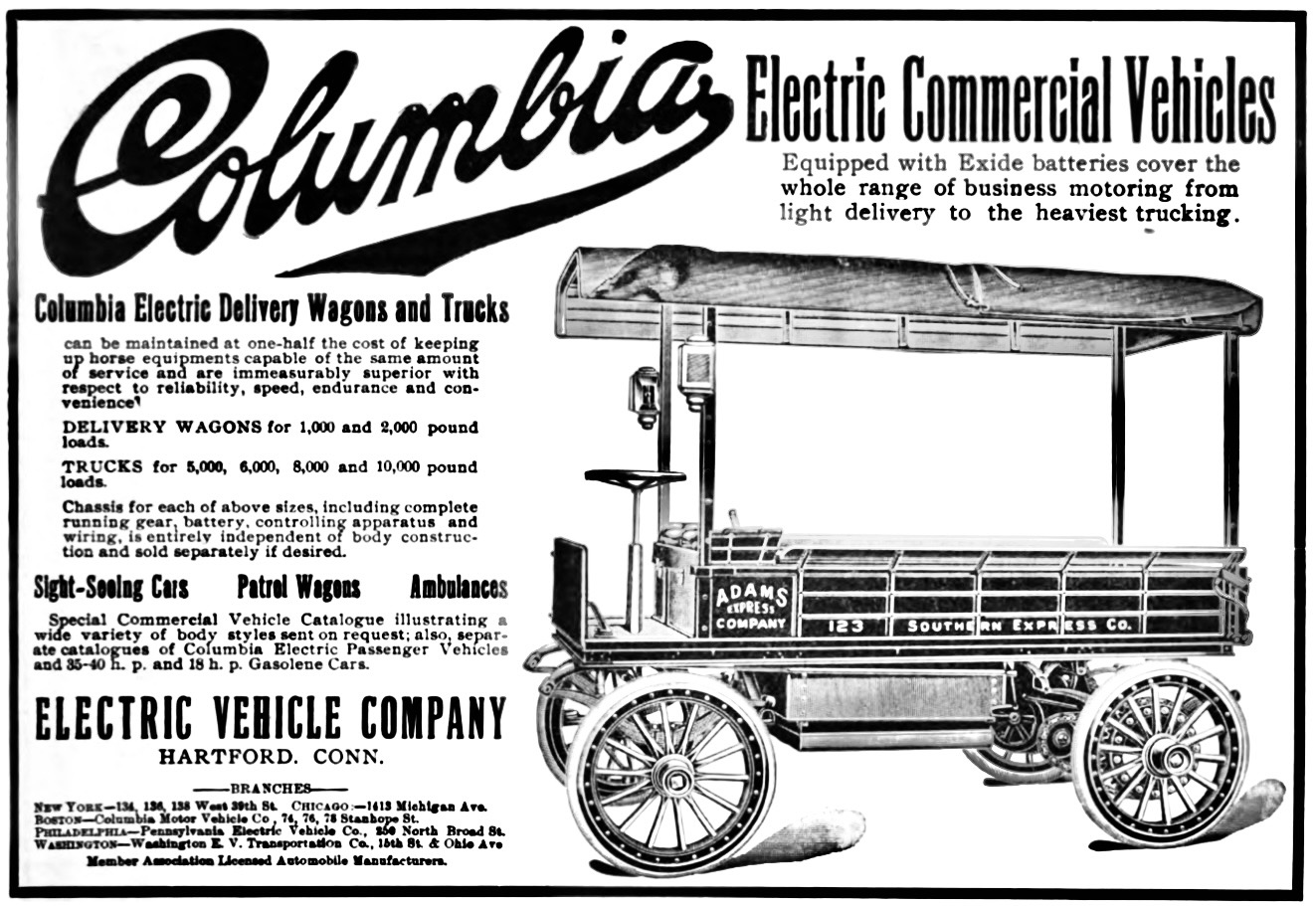
Columbia advertisement (1905)

== Overview of Electric Vehicles ==
Year	Model	Wheel base	Tread	Cells	Speed
1904	Model XXXVIII	1651 mm	1270 mm	20	15 mph (24 km/h)
1904	Model LX	1626 mm	1219 mm	20	15 mph (24 km/h)
1904	Model XIX	1740 mm	1295 mm	40	13 mph (21 km/h)
1904	Model XXXV	2076 mm	1524 mm	40	14.5 mph (23 km/h)
1904	Model XXXIX	1880 mm	1295 mm	40	14.5 mph (23 km/h)
1904	Model XXXI	?	?	40	?
1904	Model XXXVI	1778 mm	1295 mm	40	14.5 mph (23 km/h)
1904	Model XI	1753 mm	? mm	44	12 mph (19 km/h)
1904	Model XXXIV	? mm	? mm	42	8 mph (13 km/h)
1904	Model III	1753 mm	1597 mm	42	10 mph (16 km/h)

== Internal combustion engine models ==
The Columbia Touring Car was an entirely different car. A touring car model, it used a tonneau, seating six passengers, and resembled the touring models offered by many other companies at the time. Priced at US$4,500 to US$5,000, it used a vertically mounted straight-four engine, situated at the front of the car, producing 24 hp (18 kW). A four-speed sliding transmission was fitted. The car weighed around 3,000 lb (1,400 kg). One design innovation was the "false frame" supporting the engine.

A Knight sleeve valve powered model was added to the range in 1912 and 1913, the last two years of the brand.

- Columbia Mark XLIII
- Columbia Mark XLIV
- Columbia Mark XLV
- Columbia Mark XLVI
- Columbia Mark XLVII
- Columbia Mark 48-4
- Columbia Mark 85
- Columbia Mark 48-5
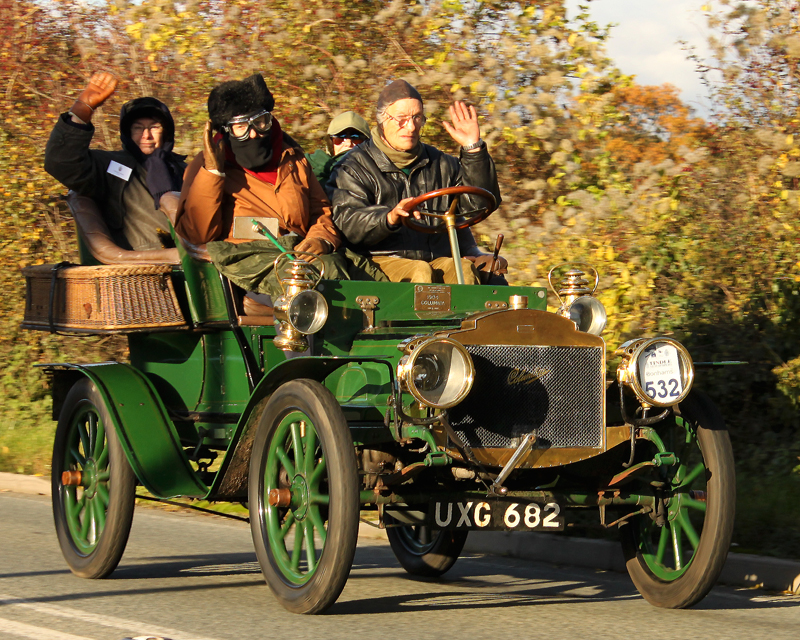
1904 Columbia gasoline 2-cylinder 12/14HP rear-entrance tonneau (photographed in 2010)

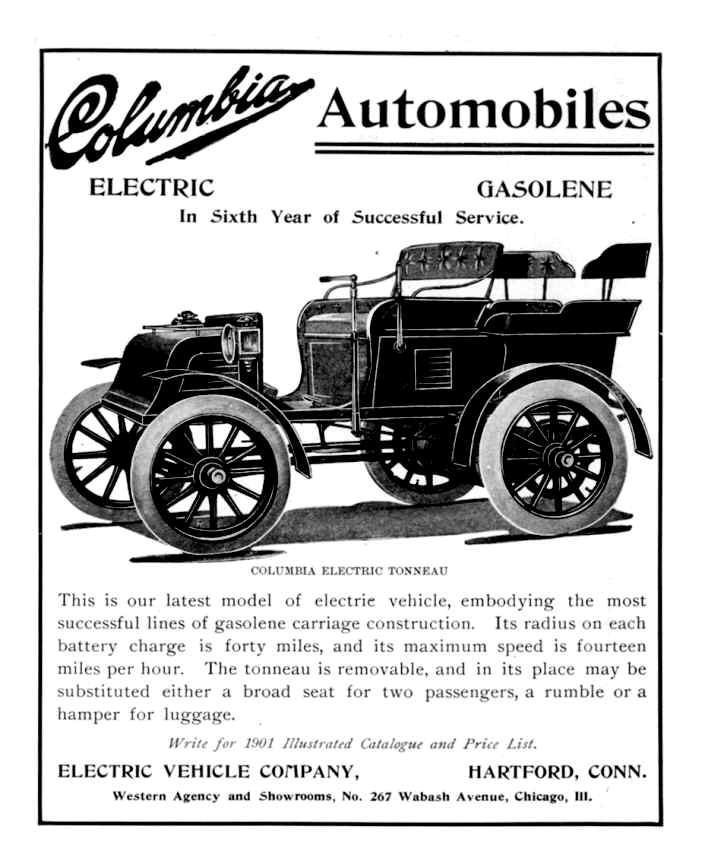
Columbia Automobile advertisement (1901) showing rear-entrance tonneau body

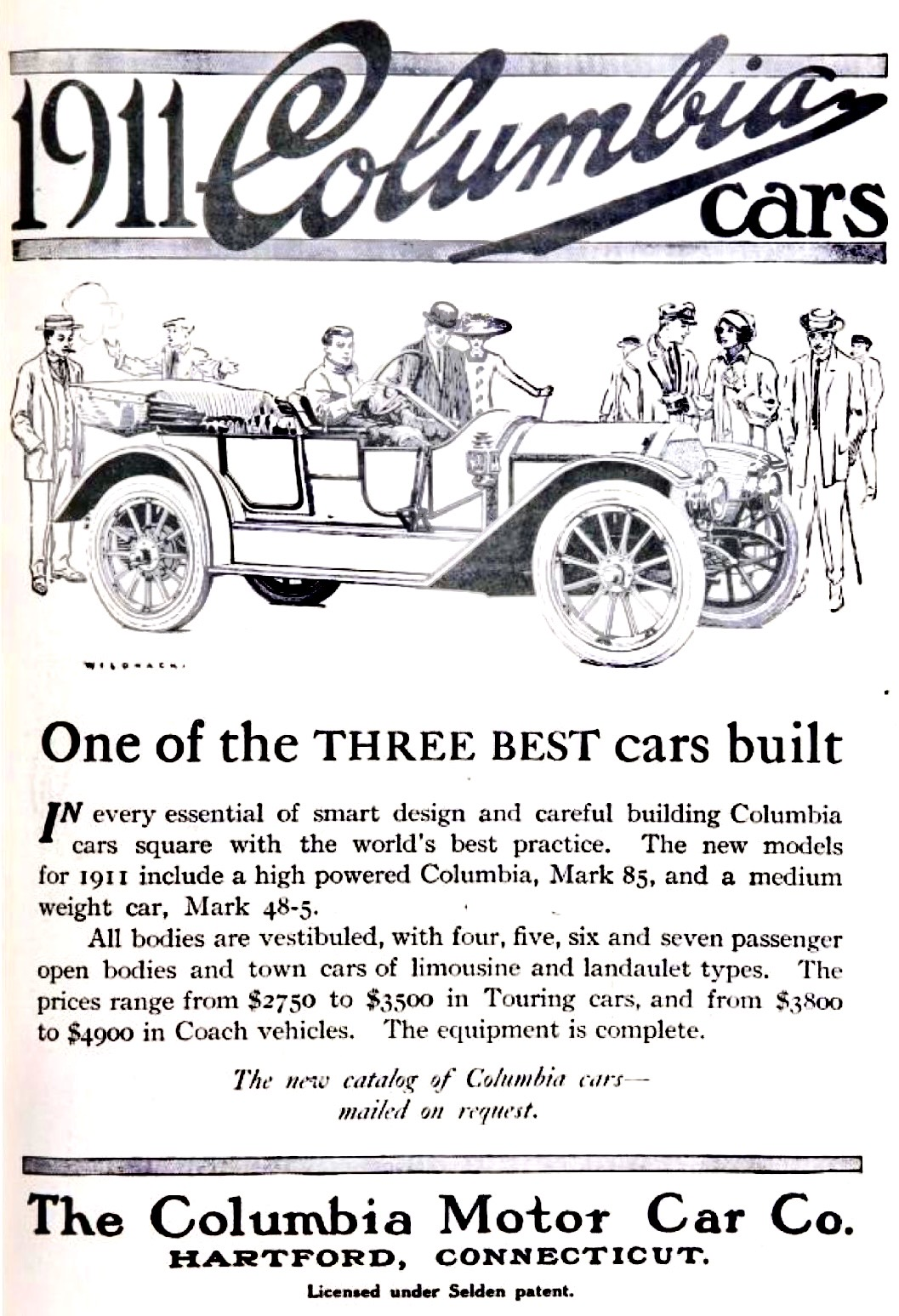
Columbia advertisement (1911)

1912 Columbia Cavalier 45 H.P.

=== Production figures ===
Year	Production figures	Model
1897	few	
1898	73	
1899	387	
1900	1,393	
1901	1,427	VIII; XIX;
1902	1,583	XIX;
1903	1,727	XIX;
1904	1,937	XXXVIII; LX; XIX; XXXV; XXXIX; XXXI; XXXVI; XI; XXXIV; III
1905	1,213	
1906	1,816	
1907	2,210	
1908	2,715	
1909	2,817	
1910	2.923	
1911	2,236	85, 48-5
1912	1,817	
1913	937	
Sum	27,211	

== See also ==
- Brass Era car
- History of the electric vehicle
- United States Motor Company
- List of defunct United States automobile manufacturers
