= United States Motor Company =

Defunct American motor vehicle manufacturer

- Type: Automobile Manufacturing
- Industry: Automotive
- Predecessor: Flanders Automobile Company
- Founded: 1910; 116 years ago
- Founder: Benjamin Briscoe
- Defunct: 1913; 113 years ago
- Fate: Formed into the Maxwell Motor Company
- Successors: Maxwell Motor Company; Chrysler; Stellantis
- Headquarters: Detroit, Michigan, U.S.

The United States Motor Company (USMC) was organized by Benjamin Briscoe in 1910 as a selling company, to represent various manufacturers. It had begun life as the International Motor Company in 1908 in an attempt to create a major consolidation within the industry with Maxwell-Briscoe and Buick, which did not succeed. International Motor was renamed USMC in December 1909. By the end of 1910, there were 11 constituent companies, each still headed by the individual who had built each company originally. In 1910, rumors surfaced that United States Motor Company was going to merge with General Motors, but Briscoe scotched the rumors by stating that any attempt to integrate General Motors into USMC would create chaos.

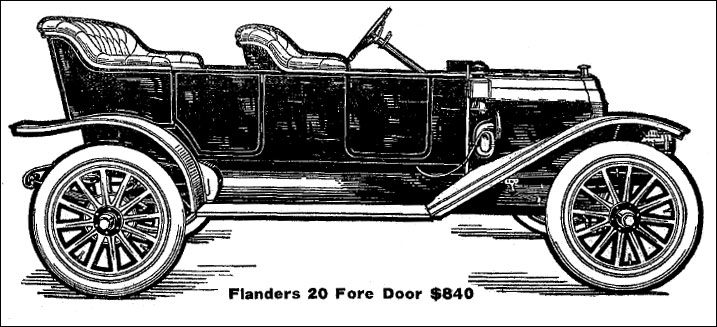
A 1911 Flanders automobile advertisement – Malvern Leader, May 4, 1911

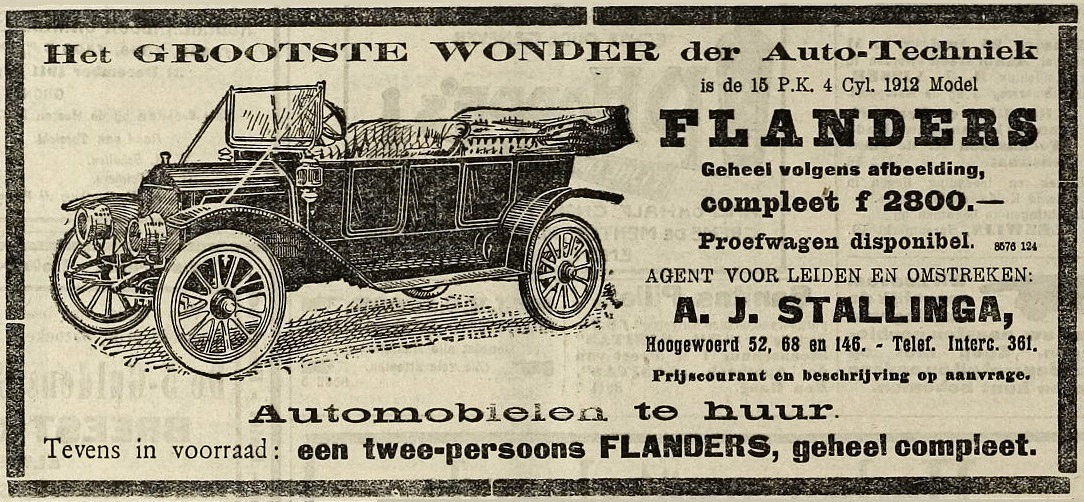
Advertisement from a 1912 newspaper in the Netherlands

This was an effort to try to save several independent automotive manufacturing companies who were having great difficulty in getting the necessary financial backing. Those companies included: Maxwell, Stoddard-Dayton, Grabowsky Motor Vehicle Company, Briscoe Manufacturing, Courier Car Co, Columbia Automobile Company, Brush Motor Car Company, Alden Sampson Trucks, Riker, Gray Marine, and Providence Engineering Works, with the Thomas and other lines coming aboard later.

1910 production announced in mid-year included 15,000 Maxwells, 10,000 Brush Runabouts, and 10,000 of the Stoddard-Dayton, Columbia, and Alden Sampson Trucks. Later in 1910, Briscoe formed United Motors International, Ltd. to handle international sales of the United States Motor Company, focused mainly on England.

Announcing some price reductions for 1911 models, the company stated that it had 18 plants with a combined floor space of 49 acres (200,000 m^{2}) with 14,000 employees capable of producing 52,000 vehicles. There were 52 models offered in 1911. It was claimed that there was no leftover stock of unsold cars from the 1910 model year and that business was up fifty-seven percent from the year-earlier period.

Briscoe several times complained that the antipathy of bankers to the automobile industry was hampering growth. In early 1912, the company suspended dividend payments on its preferred stock and in September 1912 year went into receivership. The bankers attributed the failure to bad management. A conflict between two of its backers, who also had a financial interest in General Motors, led to the downfall. Briscoe retired in late 1912 and was replaced by Walter E. Flanders as manager for the receivers committee. The assets of the United States Motor Company and constituent companies were sold for $7,080,000 at a public foreclosure sale in January 1913.

The USMC assets were purchased by Walter Flanders, who reorganized the company as the Maxwell Motor Company, Inc. This was the only surviving member of the group. In the early 1920s, this company was reorganized and became Chrysler.

== Marques ==
- Brush
- Dayton
- Alden-Sampson
- Columbia
- Riker
- Briscoe
- Detroit
- Thomas
- Sampson
- Stoddard
- Courier
- Maxwell
- Providence
- Gray Marine
