= Walter Flanders =

American industrialist (1871–1923)

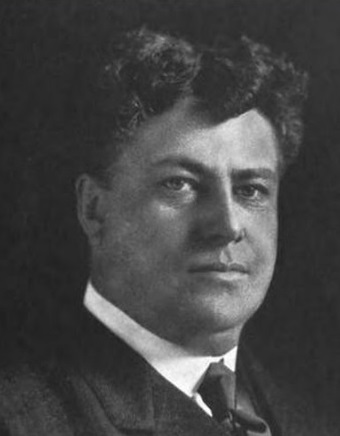
From 1916's The Romance of the Automobile Industry

Walter Emmett Flanders (March 4, 1871 – June 18, 1923) was an American industrialist in the machine tool and automotive industries and was an early mass production expert.

== Early life ==
Flanders was born March 4, 1871, in Rutland, Vermont, the son of Dr. George Flanders and Mary (Goodwin) Flanders, the oldest of three children. He was educated in Vermont and left school as a teenager to begin working as a mechanic and machinist.

== Career ==
Recognized as an expert in the field of machine tools, in 1905 he obtained a contract to produce 5,000 crankcases for Henry Ford. His success led Ford to recruit Flanders to the Ford Motor Company in 1906 to become the company's production manager" During his two years at Ford, Flanders helped orient its operations toward the coming era of mass production, including introducing the concepts of fixed monthly output and of transferring some of the carrying of parts inventories from the Ford company to its suppliers. He also rearranged the layout of machine tools in the plant to improve efficiency by creating a more orderly sequence of operations. This work formed a foundation on which others at Ford would build as they spent the next five years (1908–1913) developing the concept of the modern assembly line.

Flanders left Ford in 1908 to co-found the E-M-F Company, which was acquired by Studebaker in 1910. Later he founded the United States Motor Company, and he reorganized Maxwell after the fall of the United States Motor Company. In 1917, President Woodrow Wilson consulted with Flanders and other automobile industry leaders, including Henry Ford, William C. Durant, and John Dodge to determine the best methods for producing vehicles to equip the U.S. military for World War I.

Flanders played a role in the Rickenbacker Motor Company, founded in 1921.

Flanders also produced more than 2,000 motorcycles from 1911 to 1912 of which about two dozen still exist today. An example was on display at the AMA Motorcycle Museum in Columbus, Ohio. Another is at the Barber Vintage Motorsports Museum.

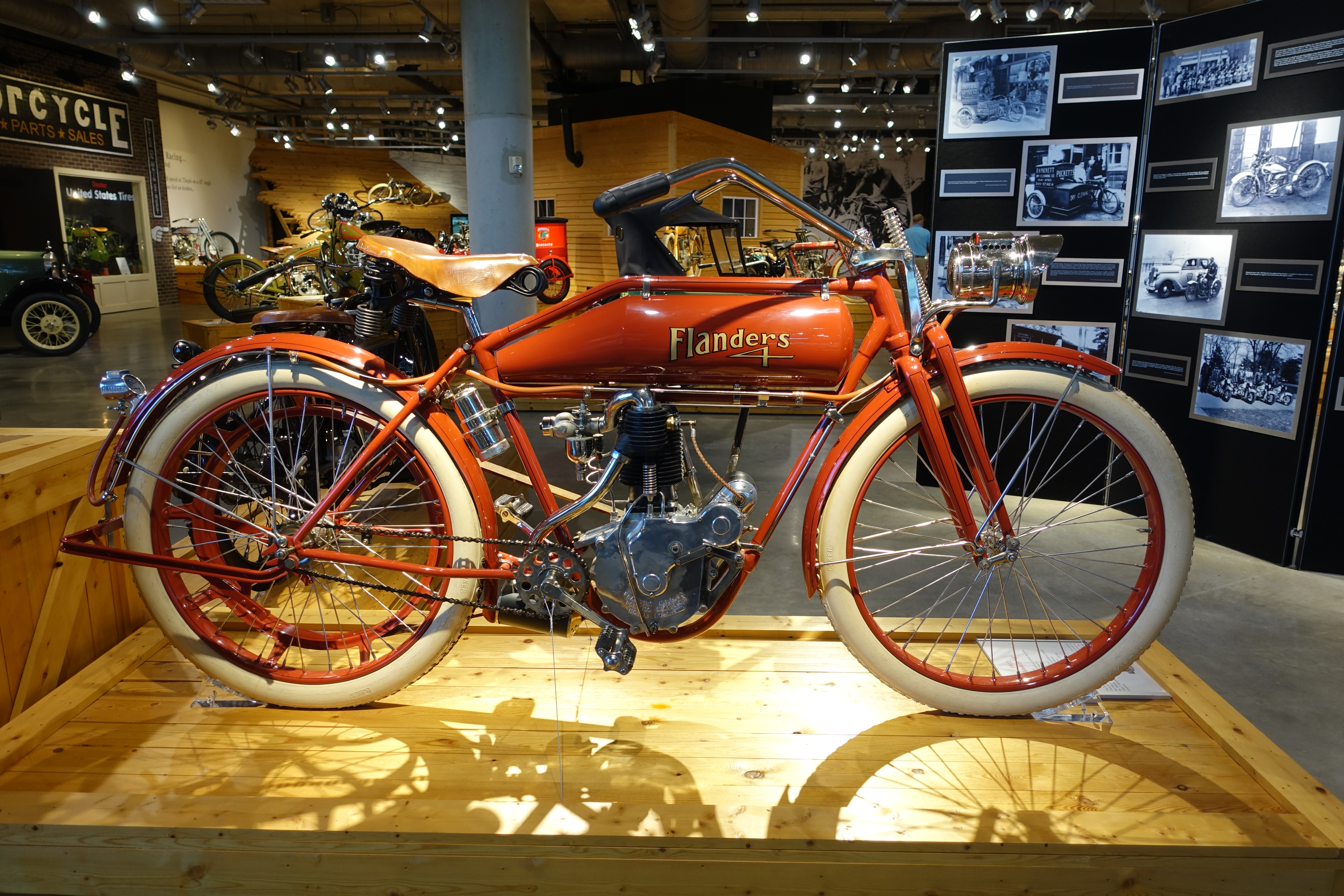
1911 Flanders 4 motorcycle on display at the Barber Vintage Motorsports Museum, Birmingham, Alabama. The single-cylinder motorcycle had a displacement of 483cc.

== Death and burial ==
Flanders died in Newport News, Virginia, on June 18, 1923, as the result of complications following a car accident in which he'd been involved three days earlier. According to friends, he was en route to his home in Williamsburg when he tried to pass another car and lost control of his. He sustained a broken leg and several internal injuries, and his death was attributed to kidney failure. He was buried at Williamsburg Memorial Park in Williamsburg.

He was inducted into the Automotive Hall of Fame in 1994.

== Sources ==
- Flanders, Charles M.; Dunbar, Edith Flanders (2010-09-12), The Flanders Family: From Europe to America (in Winzipped RTF download), vol. 3 (2nd ed.), archived from the original on 2011-06-11.
- Sorensen, Charles E. (1956), My Forty Years with Ford, New York: W. W. Norton, LCCN 56010854, OCLC 912748. Various republications, including ISBN 9780814332795.

== Suggested reading ==
- Finney, E. J. (1992), Walter E. Flanders : His Role in the Mass Production of Automobiles, California: The author, LCCN 92128214
- Yanik, Anthony J. (2001), The E-M-F Company : the Story of Automotive Pioneers Barney Everitt, William Metzger, and Walter Flanders, Warrendale, PA, USA: Society of Automotive Engineers, ISBN 978-0-7680-0716-9, LCCN 2001020707
