= Flanders Automobile Company =

American automobile manufacturer

- Type: Automobile Manufacturing
- Industry: Automotive
- Founded: 1910; 116 years ago
- Founder: Walter E. Flanders
- Defunct: 1913; 113 years ago
- Fate: Merged into the United States Motor Company, although some of their assets were bought by Studebaker
- Successor: United States Motor Company; Studebaker
- Headquarters: Detroit, Michigan, United States

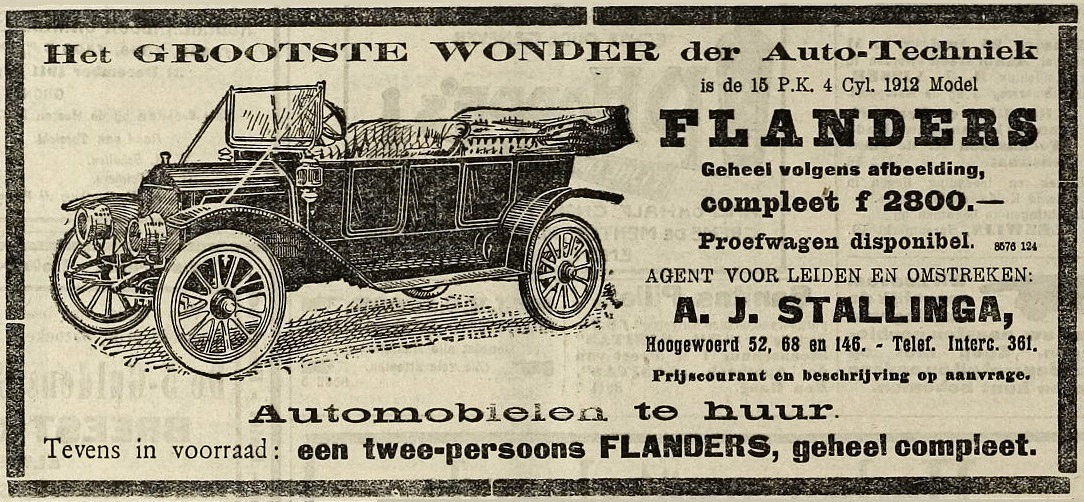
Advertisement from a 1912 newspaper in the Netherlands

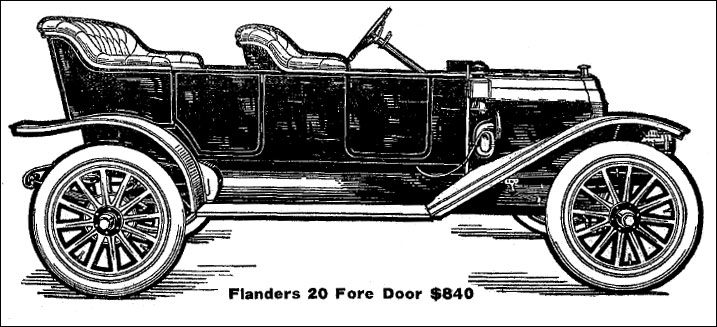
A 1911 Flanders automobile advertisement – Malvern Leader, May 4, 1911

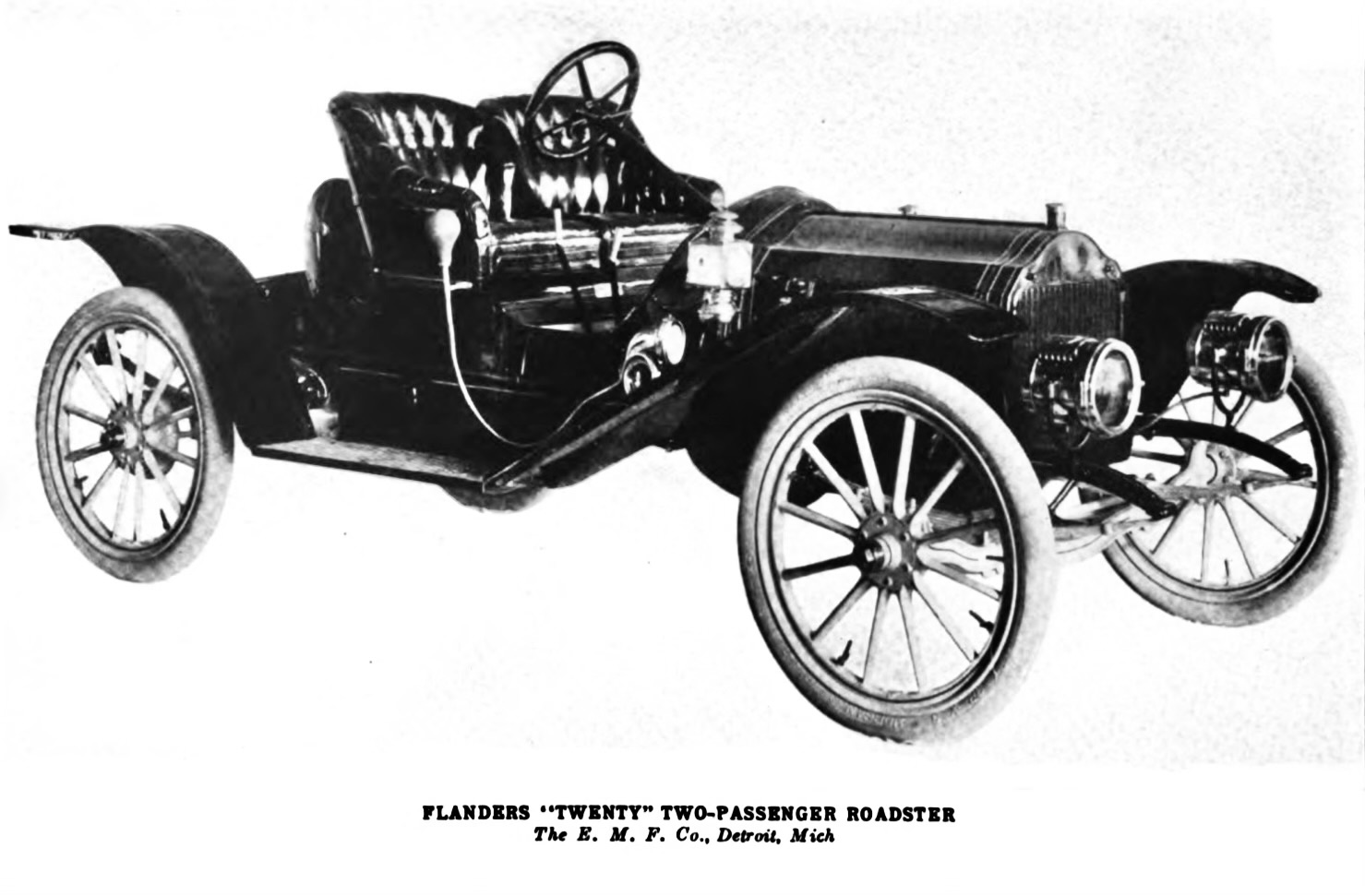
Flanders Model 20

The Flanders Automobile Company was a short-lived US-American automobile manufacturer which operated in Detroit, Michigan, from 1910 to 1913. Its only product was sold through Studebaker dealerships.

It was the brainchild of Walter E. Flanders (1871–1923), who formerly held a position as General Factory Manager at the Ford Motor Company's Piquette avenue plant.

In 1908, Flanders left the Ford Motor Company and co-founded, together with Bernard F. Everitt and William Metzger, the E-M-F Automobile Company in Detroit. This car, based on Flander's experience with the Model T Ford was the first mass-produced Flanders car. At the beginning, there were two offerings, model "30" and model "20". The "30", although prone to many faults, failed to outsell the Model T Ford. Although second in its best year, it was beaten by the Model T with a wide margin.

In this situation, Flanders convinced the Studebaker brothers, who held substantial stock in E-M-F and were its sole distributor in the USA, to buy the defunct factory of the De Luxe Motor Company in Detroit, and to build there a new challenger to Ford. So, E-M-F dropped the "20", concentrating on their model "30". The new Flanders, appropriately named model "20", was patterned after this smaller E-M-F.

== Flanders Model "20" ==
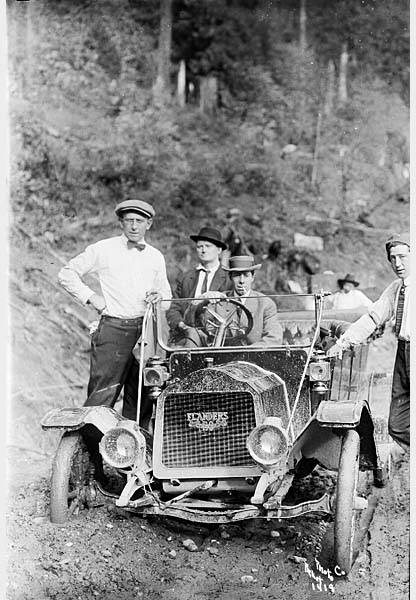
Flanders Model "20" on a dirt road

This little car had a 4-cylinder engine with 20 hp (15 kW), a 100-inch (2,500 mm) wheelbase and was focused on a price of $750 in 1909 - then lower than Ford's "T". But, as Ford was able to cut its price regularly, the Flanders remained more expensive than the Model T. In their best year, 1911, E-M-F and Flanders together ranked 2nd in the industry.

In its first year, only two body styles were offered: a runabout for 2 passengers priced at $750, and a 4-passenger touring car for $790. More body styles became available in 1911. Prices were lower now, as they were over at Ford's: the model "20" runabout now cost $700, and the "suburban" that replaced the touring was set at $725. This was also the price for a new 3-passenger roadster and the first closed car in the range, a coupé for 3 passengers, cost $925. In its last year, the model "20" added a touring car. Like the Suburban, it cost $800. The least expensive Flanders was the roadster for $750, followed by the runabout at $775. The Coupé was also slightly more expensive at $1,000. The wheelbase was increased to 102 inches (2,600 mm) in 1912.

Flanders cars were also built in Canada by the E-M-F Company of Canada LTD in Walkerville, Ontario.

In 1912, however, Studebaker made the next logical step and took over E-M-F and Flanders completely, selling both now as Studebakers. A total of 31,514 cars were built in its three-year existence.

== Flanders Model "50-Six" ==
Earlier E-M-F partners Bernard F. Everitt and William Metzger had also developed a new car. When they left E-M-F in 1909, they built a car very similar to the model "30" Everitt and added, with the model "Six-48", a much bigger car with a starter device that worked with pressured air. There were two body styles, a 3-passenger roadster at $2,200 and a touring car for 7 passengers at $2,250.

When Flanders rejoined his old companions, a reorganisation took place during which the company's name changed from Metzger Company to Everitt Motor Company and, in late 1912, finally became the Flanders Motor Company.

Only the big 6-cylinder car appeared under the Flanders label. This model "50-Six" was in general the Everitt Six-48 with the addition of electric lighting and starting.

Only a handful of these 130 inch-wheelbase-cars might have been built as, shortly after introduction, Walter Flanders was asked by Benjamin Briscoe to help save the United States Motor Company which was in severe trouble. Flanders agreed. In the end, of the about 12 makes involved, including his own Flanders, he closed all but one: The Maxwell, ancestor of the later Chrysler Corporation.

== Sources ==
Kimes, Beverly R. (editor), Clark, Henry A.: The Standard Catalog of American Cars 1805–1945, Krause Publications (1985), ISBN 0-87341-045-9
