= Columbia Motors =

American automobile manufacturer, 1916–1924

- Industry: Automotive
- Founded: 1916
- Founder: John George Bayerline
- Defunct: 1924
- Headquarters: Detroit, Michigan, USA
- Products: Automobiles

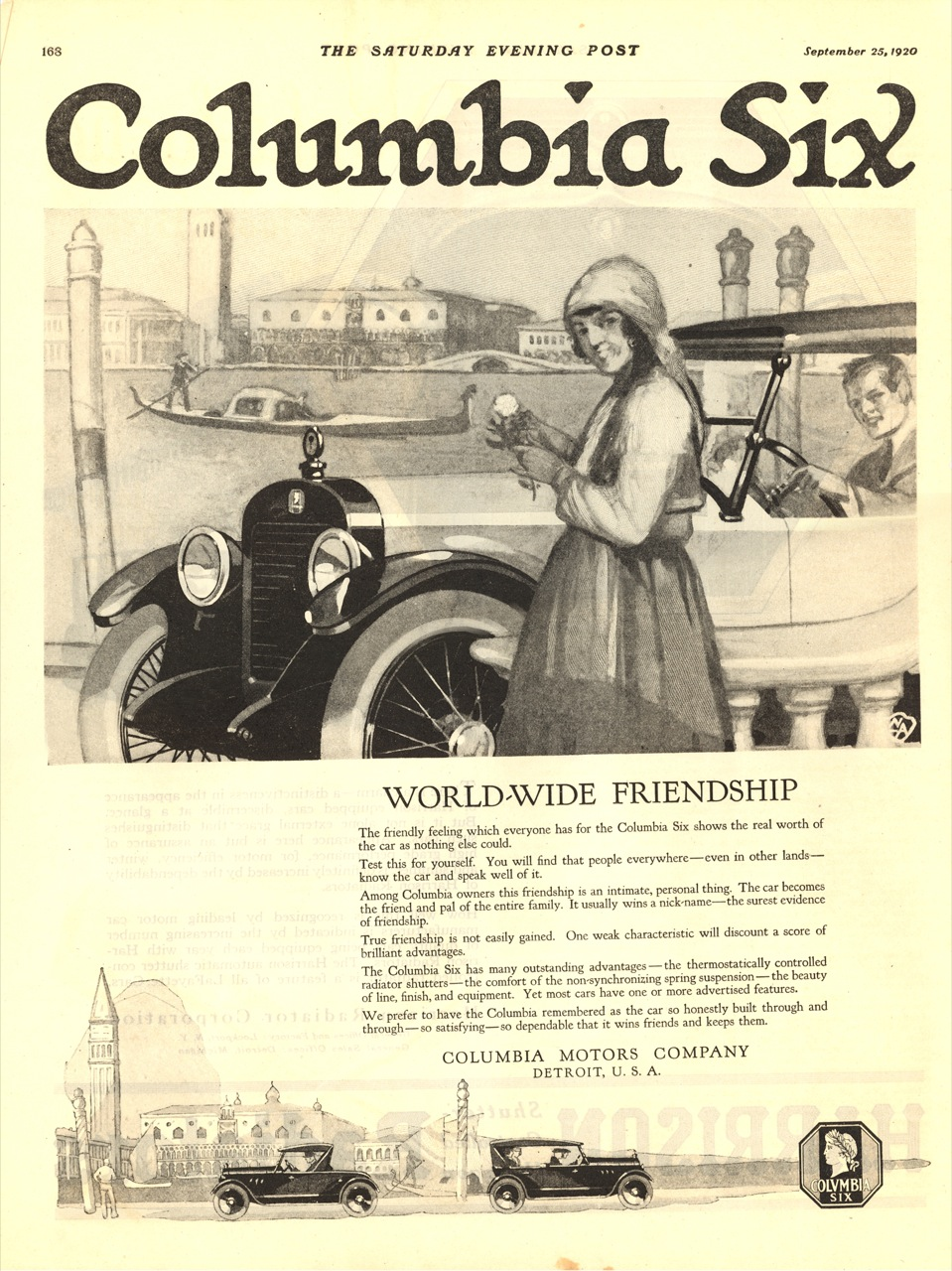
1920 advertisement for the Columbia Six, with artwork curiously showing the car-less city of Venice

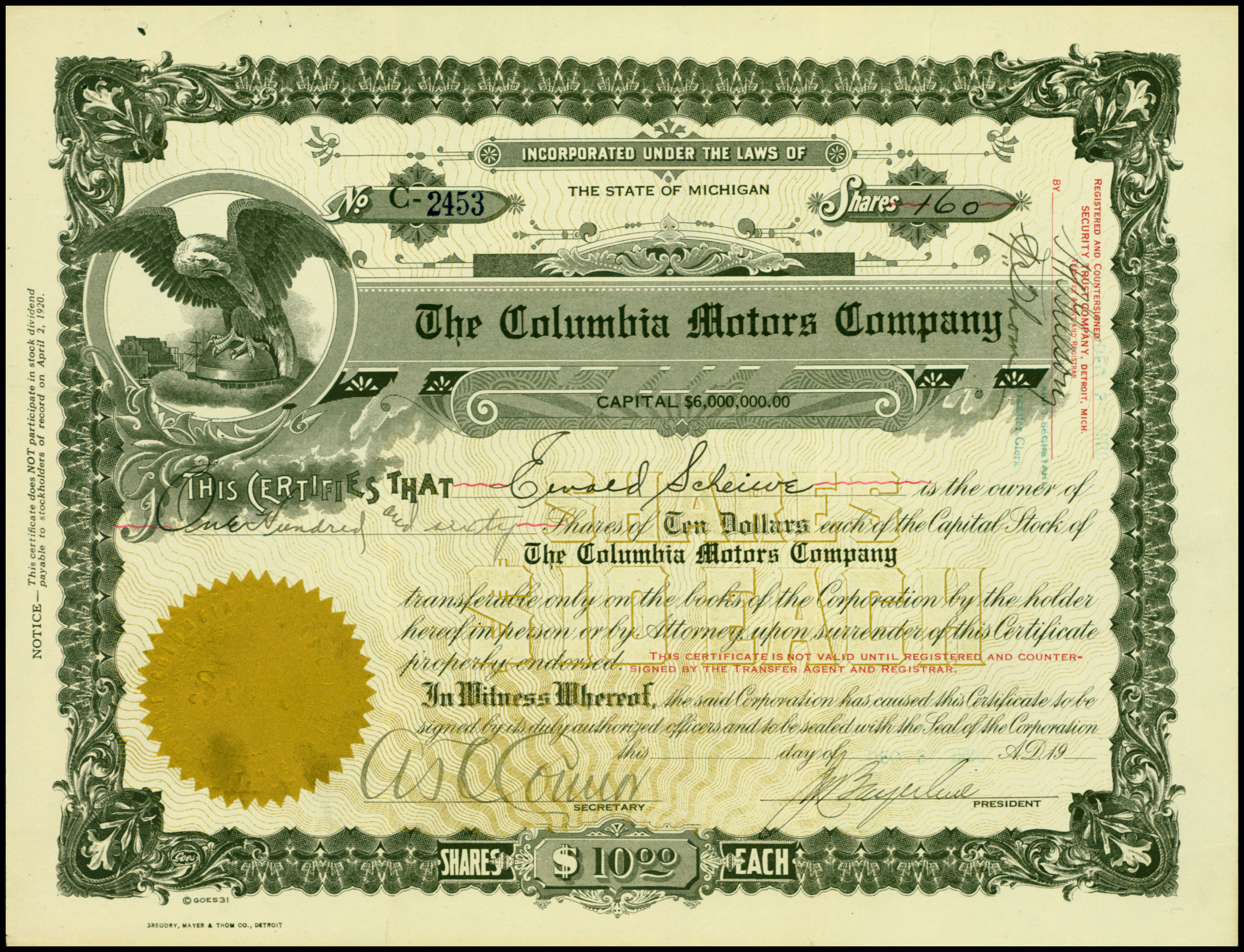
Share of the Columbia Motors Company, issued 4. January 1921

Columbia Motors was a Detroit, Michigan, United States based automobile manufacturer that produced automobiles from 1916 to 1924.

Columbia Motors was incorporated in 1916, with John George Bayerline, as company president and William E. Metzger as vice-president. Bayerline was the former president and general manager of the King Motor Car Company, and former general manager and founder of the Warren Motor Car Company. Prior to founding Columbia, Metzger was a founder of the E-M-F Company which was later purchased by the Studebaker Corporation.

Columbia Motors produced two models powered by Continental six-cylinder engines including the popular Columbia Six. In 1916, Columbia bought Argo Electric. A 1916 news item in the journal Horseless Age presents a "Columbia Touring Car". In 1923, Columbia acquired Liberty Motor Car.

== See also ==
- Vintage car
- List of defunct United States automobile manufacturers
