= Northern (automobile) =

Manufacturer of Brass Era automobiles in Detroit

Northern Manufacturing Company Northern Motor Car Company
- Company type: Automobile Manufacturing
- Industry: Automotive
- Founded: 1902; 124 years ago
- Defunct: 1908; 118 years ago
- Fate: Merged with Wayne and then E-M-F
- Successor: E-M-F Company
- Headquarters: Detroit, Michigan, United States
- Key people: Charles B. King, Jonathan D. Maxwell, William E. Metzger
- Products: Automobiles; Automotive parts

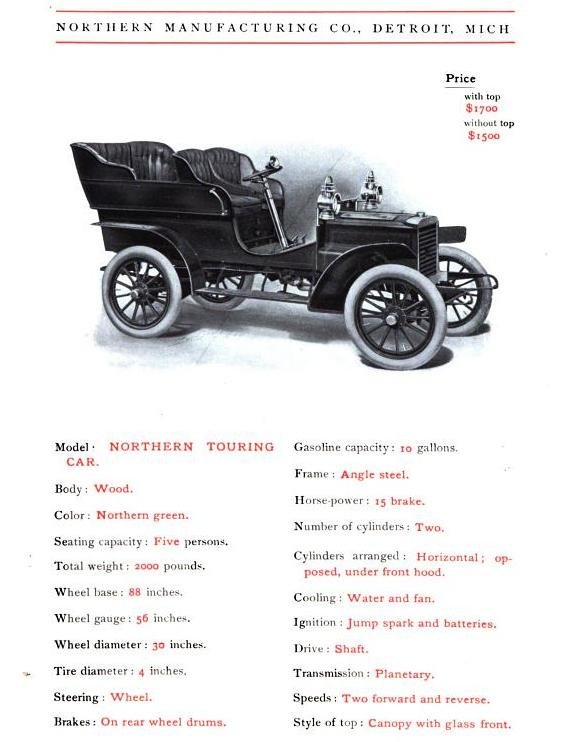
1905 Northern Touring Car

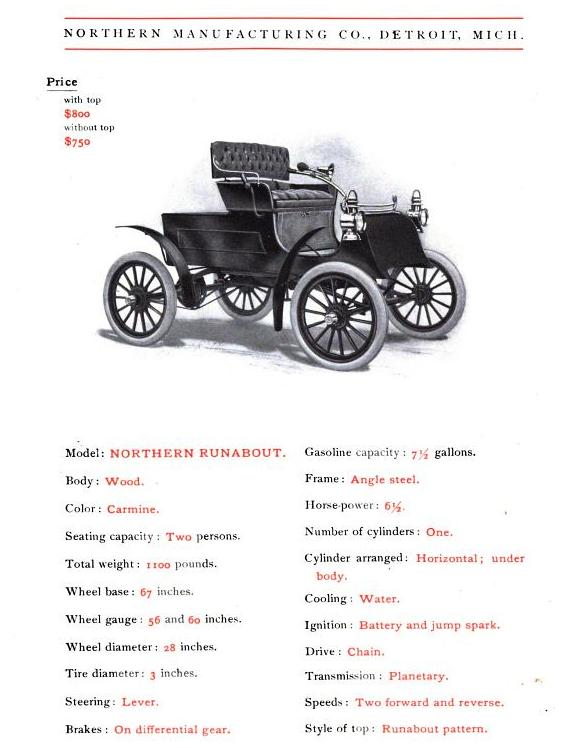
1905 Northern Runabout

Northern Manufacturing Company was a manufacturer of Brass Era automobiles in Detroit, Michigan, automobiles designed by Charles Brady King. Early advertising included catchy phrases such as "Utility is the Basis for Beauty" and "Built for Business" and the famous "Silent Northern".

== History ==
In 1902 Charles B. King, Jonathan Maxwell and William E. Metger created the Northern Manufacturing Company. Though the automobile industry was in its infancy, King and Maxwell had already compiled a resume of automotive experience. Both had worked for R. E. Olds. King, who had an engineering degree from Cornell and had moved to Detroit in 1891, was the chief designer at Oldsmobile but left the company after the 1901 fire at the plant.

Maxwell had produced a single-cylinder 5-horsepower engine which was used to power the new Northern automobiles. The first Northern roadsters produced strongly resembled the curved dash Oldsmobile that both Maxwell and King helped to design. They were all single-cylinder runabouts with tiller steering, a 67-inch wheelbase and two-speed planetary transmission. Priced at $750,(equivalent to $26,875 in 2025) they sold 300 in 1903.

In 1903, Maxwell was lured away by Benjamin Briscoe, and the Maxwell-Briscoe Motor Company in Tarrytown, New York, was formed. The Maxwell car was introduced in 1905.

King did all engineering after 1903 and by 1904 the company was offering a two-cylinder touring car as well as the runabout. The engineering was advanced for the period and included shaft drive and left-hand steering. Air-operated brakes and clutch were featured by 1906. To support the growth, a second plant was opened to build the two-cylinder cars in Port Huron, MI. A limousine was also added to the model choices in the two-cylinder cars.

In 1906 a 30-horsepower four-cylinder touring car was introduced, and the company was renamed Northern Motor Car Company. In 1907 another larger version with an advertised 50 horsepower engine was introduced. The car was available as a touring car, runabout or limousine. By 1908 the model choices were somewhat reduced but still included the original one-cylinder runabout.

== Production models ==
Northern's production figures in 1906 amounted to 600 vehicles.

- Northern 17 HP
- Northern Limousine 17 HP
- Northern 18 HP
- Northern 7 HP
- Northern Type A
- Northern Type C
- Northern Type K
- Northern Type L

== Demise ==
In June 1908 Northern merged with Wayne Automobile Company and production of the cars with the Northern name ceased. However the two companies would soon be taken over by E-M-F Company. After a bitter court fight in 1912, E-M-F production was taken over by Studebaker. King left the company earlier in 1908 to go to Europe to study automobile design and returned in 1910 to start the King Motor Car Company.

== Gallery ==
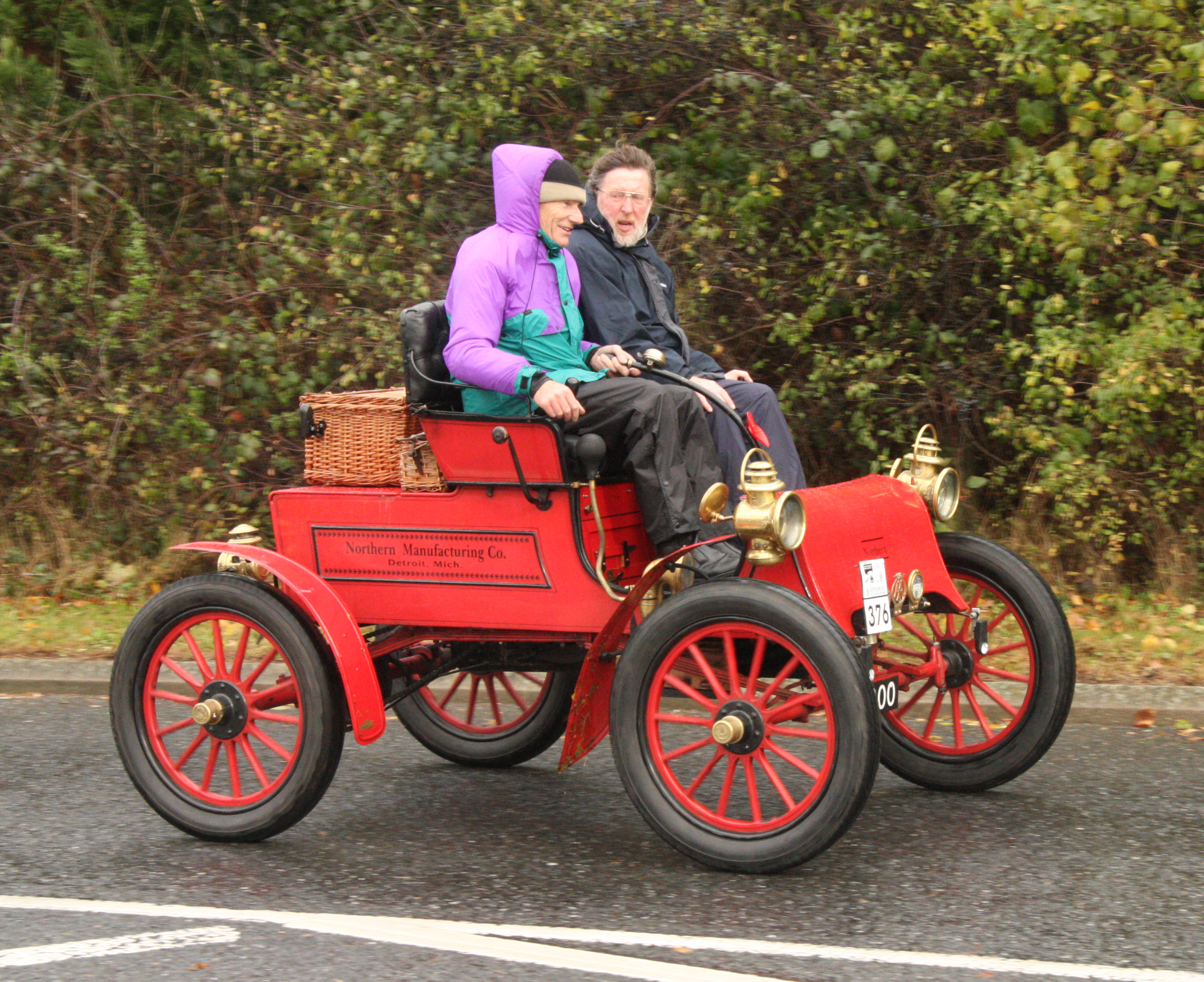
1904 Northern 6 1/2-hp Runabout

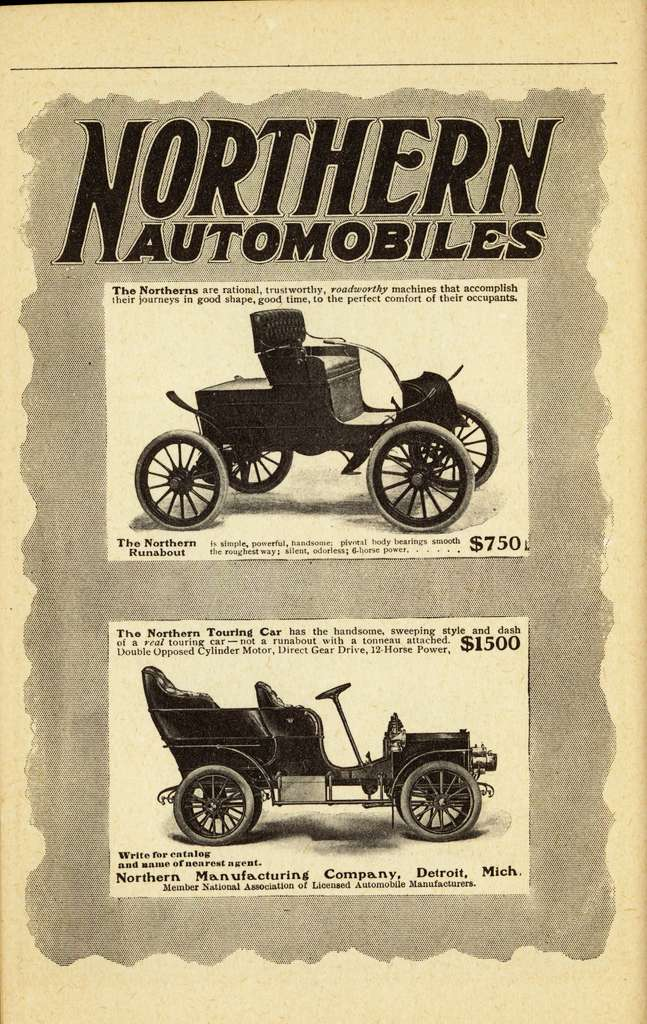
1904 Northern Runabout and Touring Car

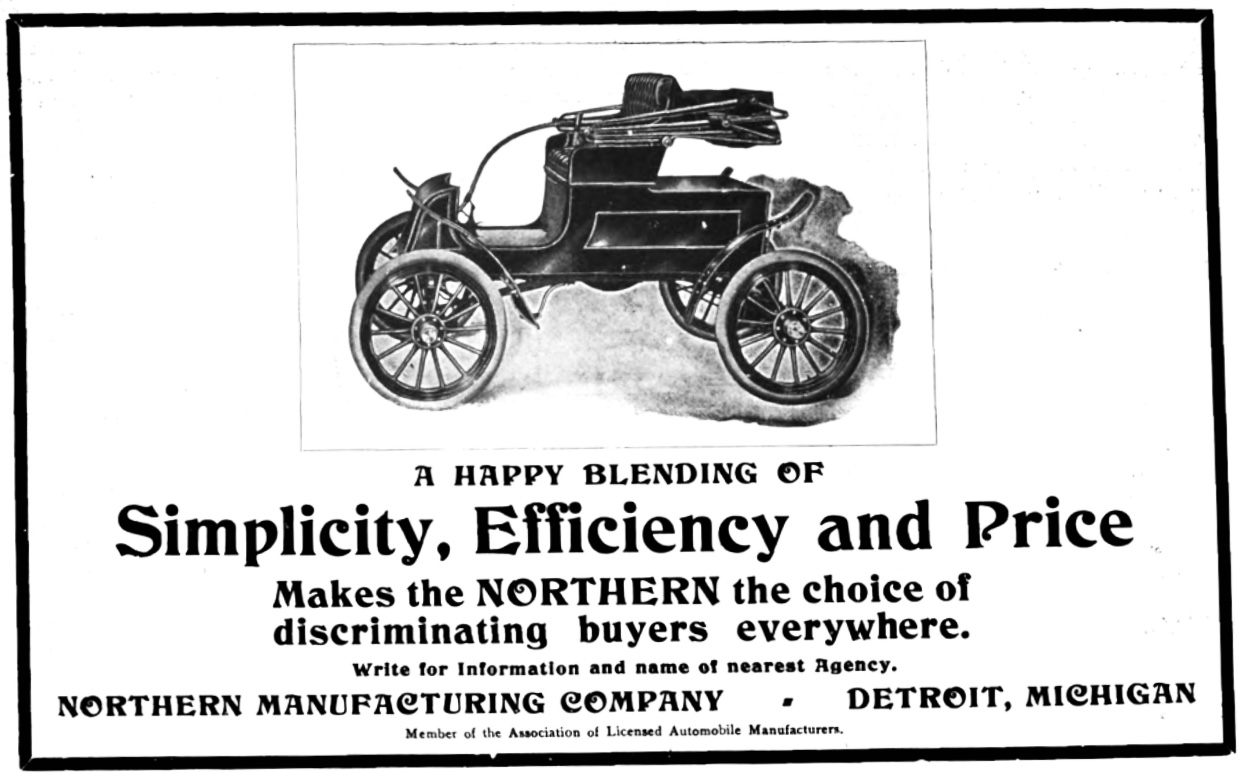
Northern Runabout (1904)

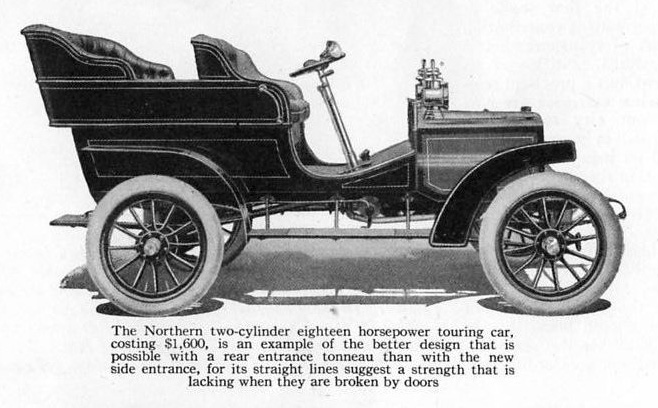
1905 Northern 18-hp Touring Car

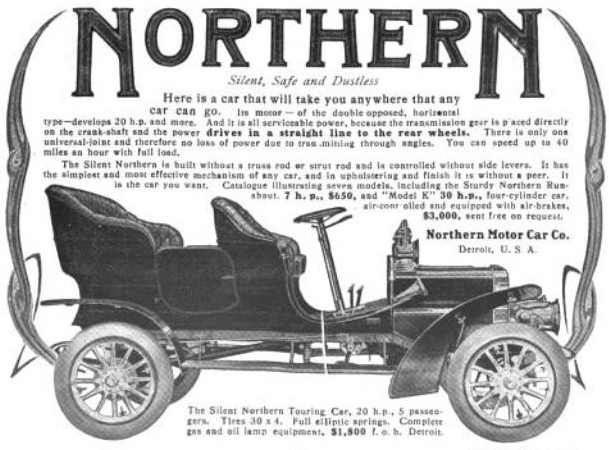
1906 Northern 20-hp Touring Car

== Norden ==
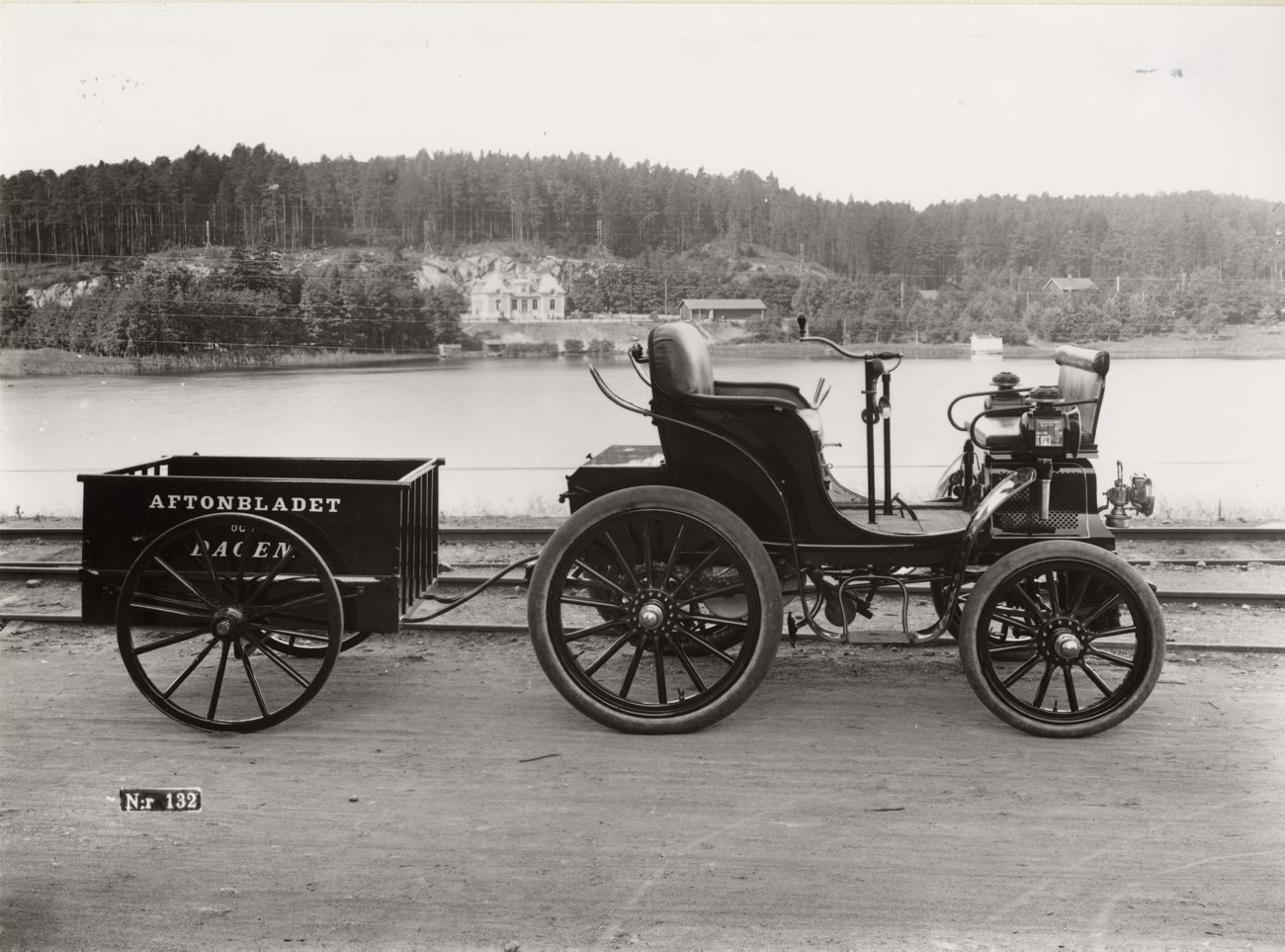
1902 Norden - AB Sodertalje Verkstader

The Norden was a Swedish automobile built from 1902 to 1906 by AB Sodertelge Verkstader. It was a licensed copy of the "Silent Northern" 6-HP made by the Northern Manufacturing Company.

== See also ==
- Northern Automobiles at ConceptCarz
- Northern history at WheelsWaterEngines
