= Wayne Automobile Company =

American truck manufacturer, 1919–1924

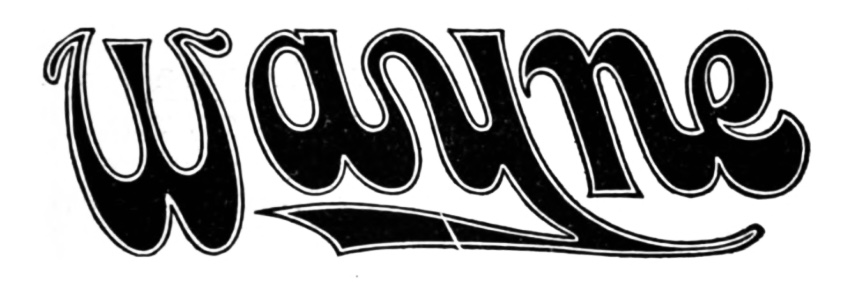
- Company type: Car Company
- Industry: Manufacturing
- Founded: 1902; 124 years ago
- Founder: William E. Kelly
- Defunct: 1908; 118 years ago
- Headquarters: Detroit, US
- Products: cars

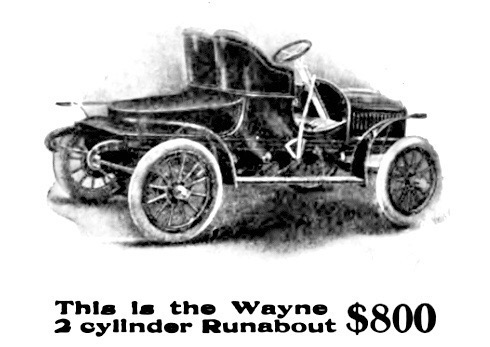
Wayne Model A 16 hp (1904-1905) two-cylinder engine displacement 3217 cc

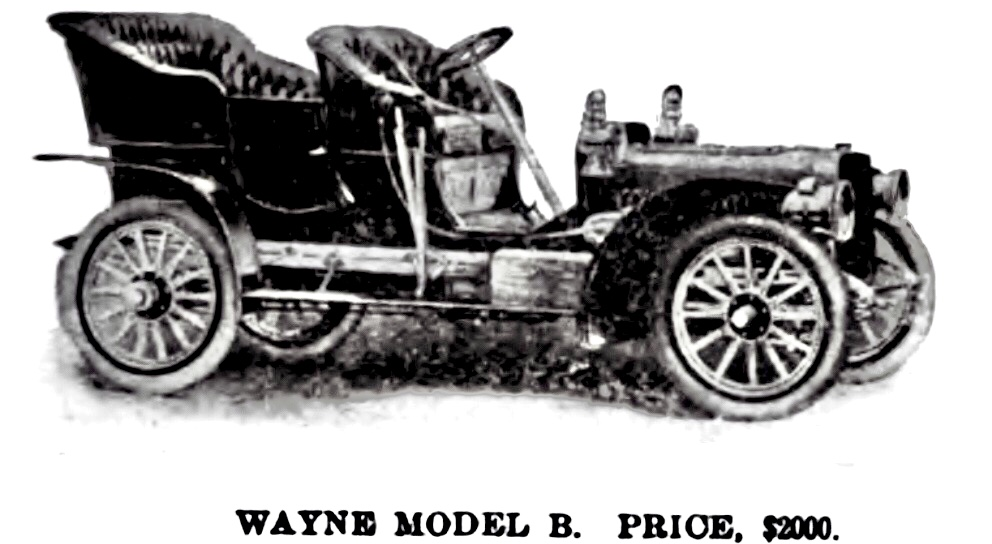
Wayne Model B (1905-1906)

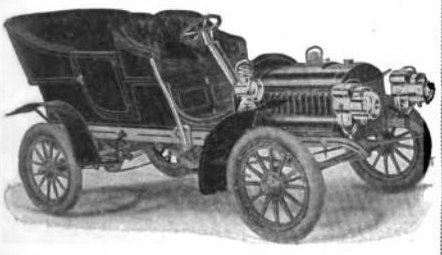
Wayne Model C (1905-1906)

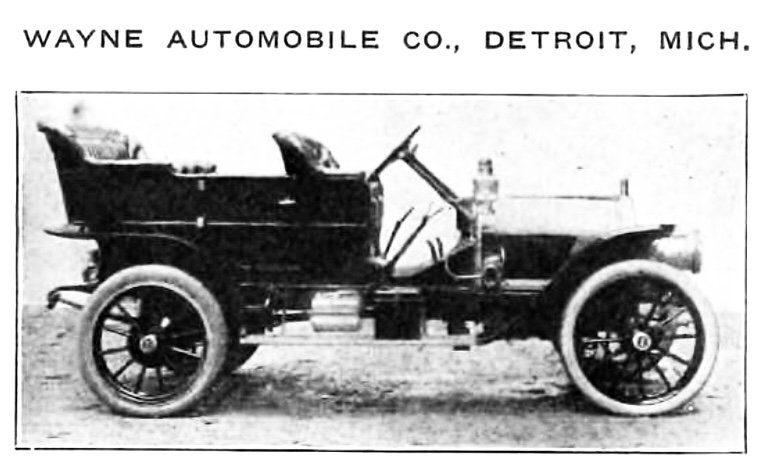
Wayne Model N (1906-1907)

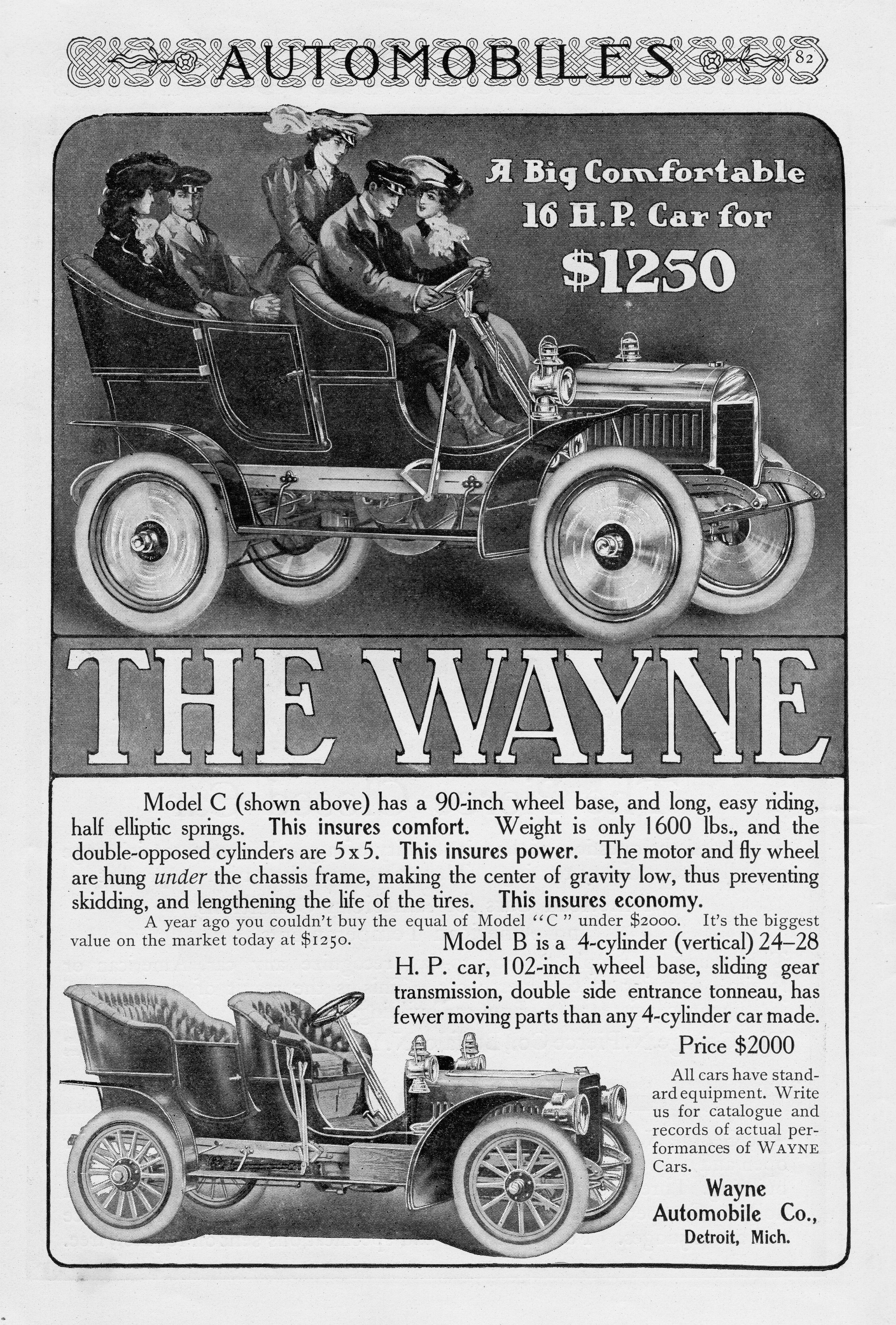
Wayne advertisement (1905)

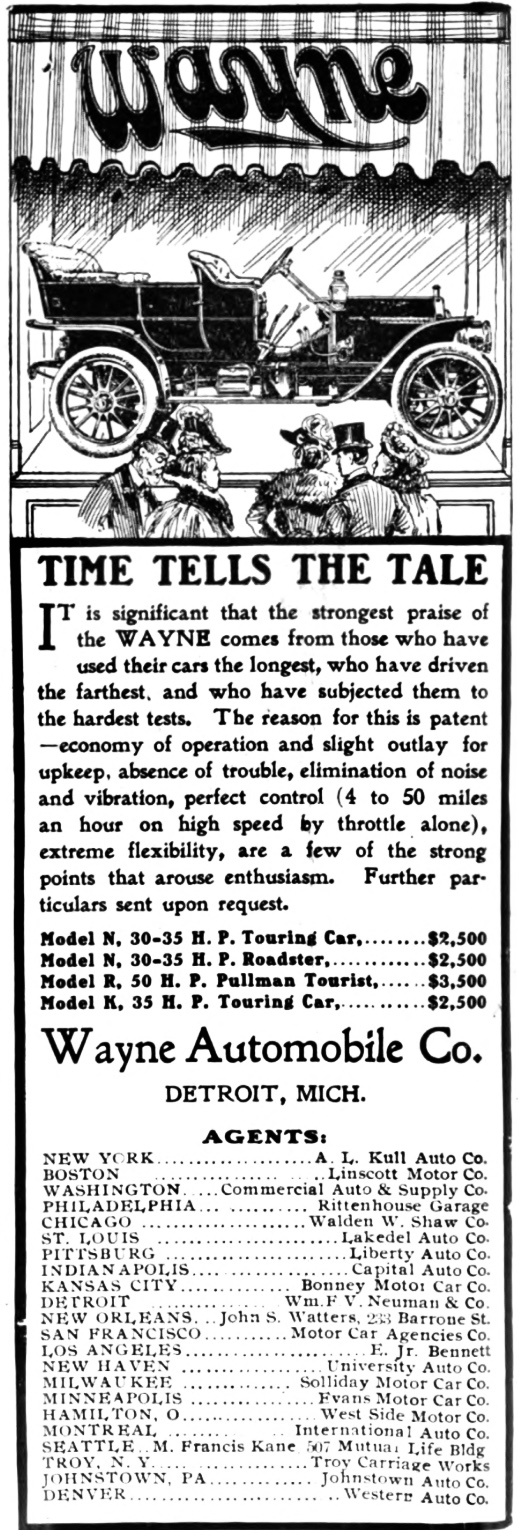
Wayne advertisement (1907)

The Wayne Automobile Company of Detroit, was a car manufacturer.

== History ==
The designer William E. Kelly founded the company in 1902 in Detroit, Michigan. The financing involved the investors J. B. Brook, Charles Palms, E. A. Skae, and Roger J. Sullivan. In 1904, the production of automobiles began with the Model A. The brand name was Wayne, named after Anthony Wayne, an American general and politician. The Model A was showcased at automobile exhibitions in New York City and Chicago. In 1907, nearly 600 vehicles were produced. In June 1908, a merger took place with the Northern Manufacturing Company. The manufacturing end of the Wayne Automobile Co. is now in charge of Thos. F. Ahern, formerly of Cleveland. Production ended in the summer of 1908. The E-M-F Company is considered the successor company.

=== Production figures Wayne Automobile Company ===
Year	Production figures	Model
1904	~ 100	A
1905	~ 200	A, B, C
1906	~ 300	B, C, F, G, H, K, N
1907	~590	K, N, R
1908	~ 400	30
Sum	~ 1,600	
