= Rickenbacker (car) =

Defunct American motor vehicle manufacturer

Rickenbacker Motor Company
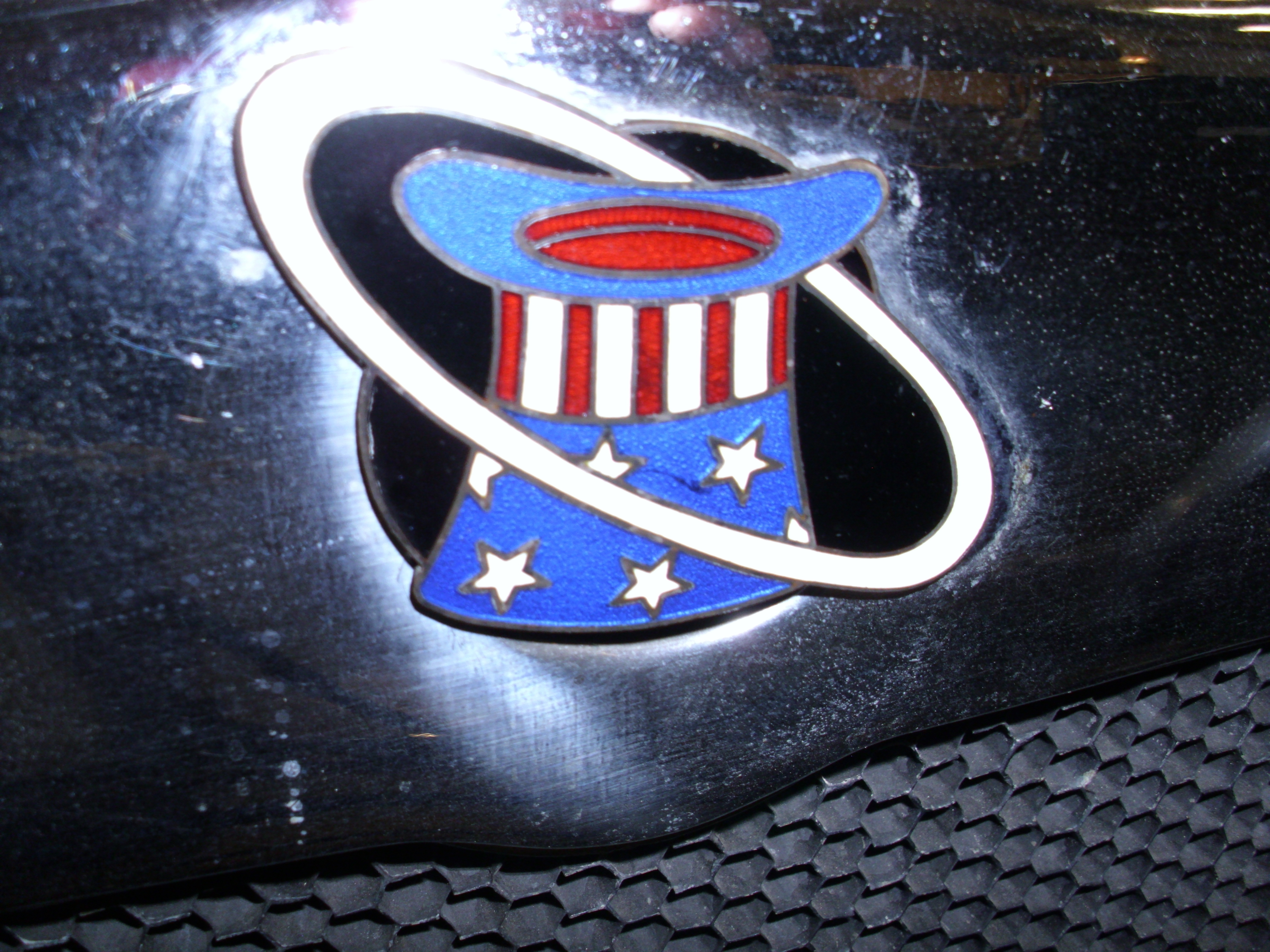
- A Car Worthy of the Name
- Industry: Automotive
- Founded: 1921; 105 years ago
- Defunct: 1927; 99 years ago
- Fate: Bankruptcy
- Headquarters: Detroit, Michigan, United States
- Key people: Barney Everitt, Eddie Rickenbacker, Walter Flanders, William E. Metzger
- Products: Automobiles
- Production output: 27,419 (1922-1927)

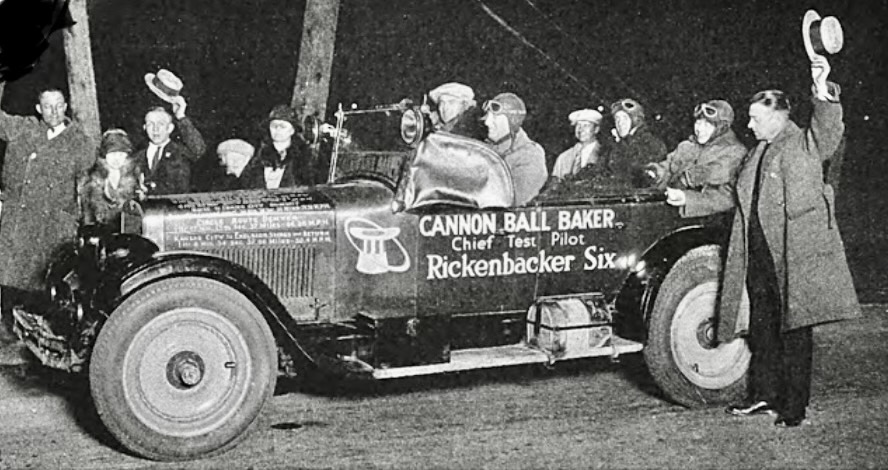
Rickenbacker six (1925-1926)

Rickenbacker was a Vintage Era automobile manufactured in Detroit, Michigan, from 1922 until 1927. The car is best known for pioneering production of four-wheel brakes.

== History ==
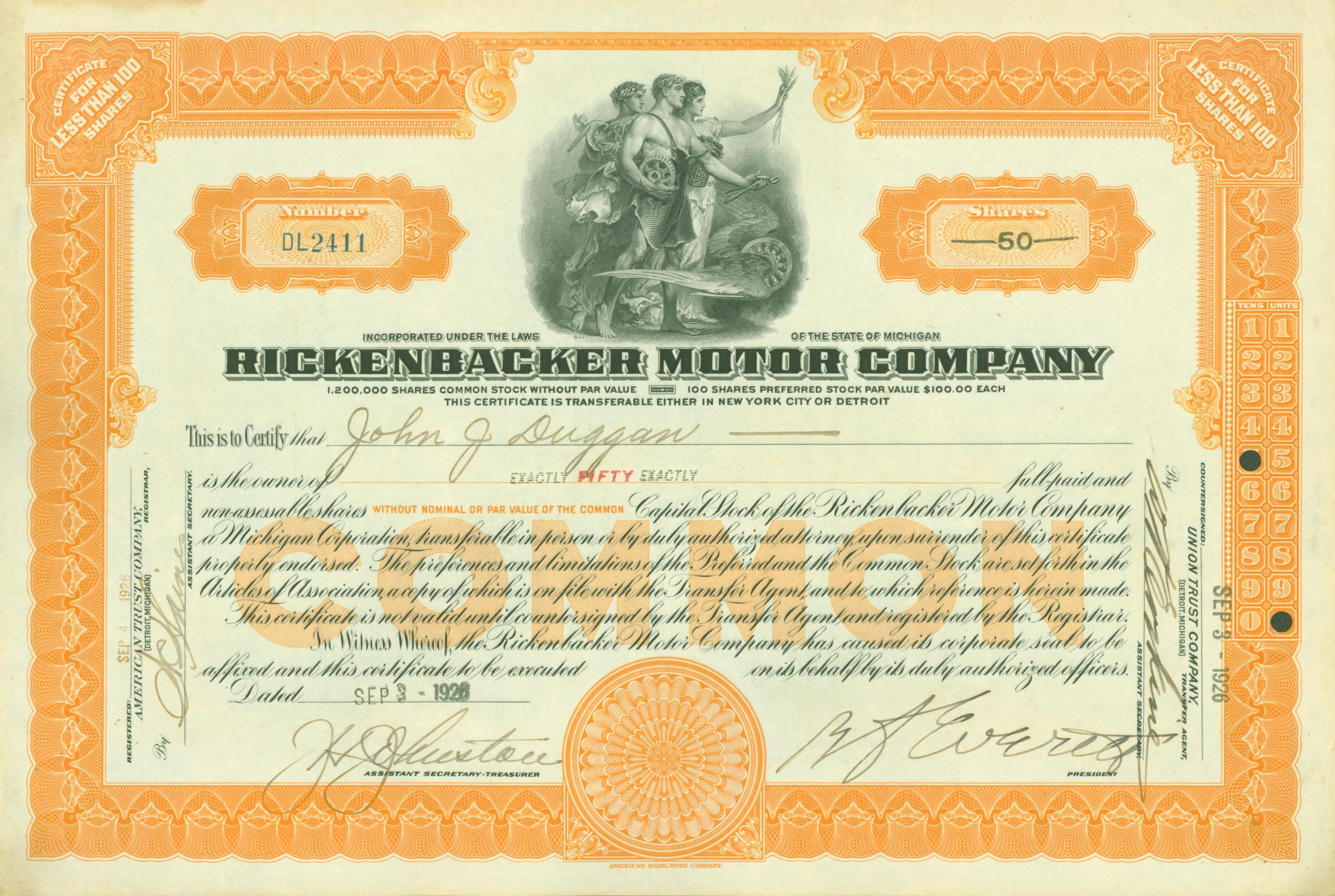
Share of the Rickenbacker Motor Company, issued 3 September 1926

The company was established by Barney Everitt and Captain Eddie Rickenbacker, with Rickenbacker serving as Vice President and Director of Sales. Everitt's former partners Walter Flanders and William Metzger were also involved. Rickenbacker used his World War I, 94th Aero Squadron emblem depicting a top hat inside a ring. The 'Hat in a Ring' emblems were located both on the front and the back of the cars.

The Rickenbacker was designed by engineers Harry L. Cunningham and E.R. Evans. It had a 3,482cc side-valve six-cylinder engine developing 58-hp, which ran very smoothly due to two flywheels, one at each end of the crankshaft. The first Rickenbackers were displayed at the January 1922 New York Automobile Show. One of the display cars featured experimental four-wheel brakes.

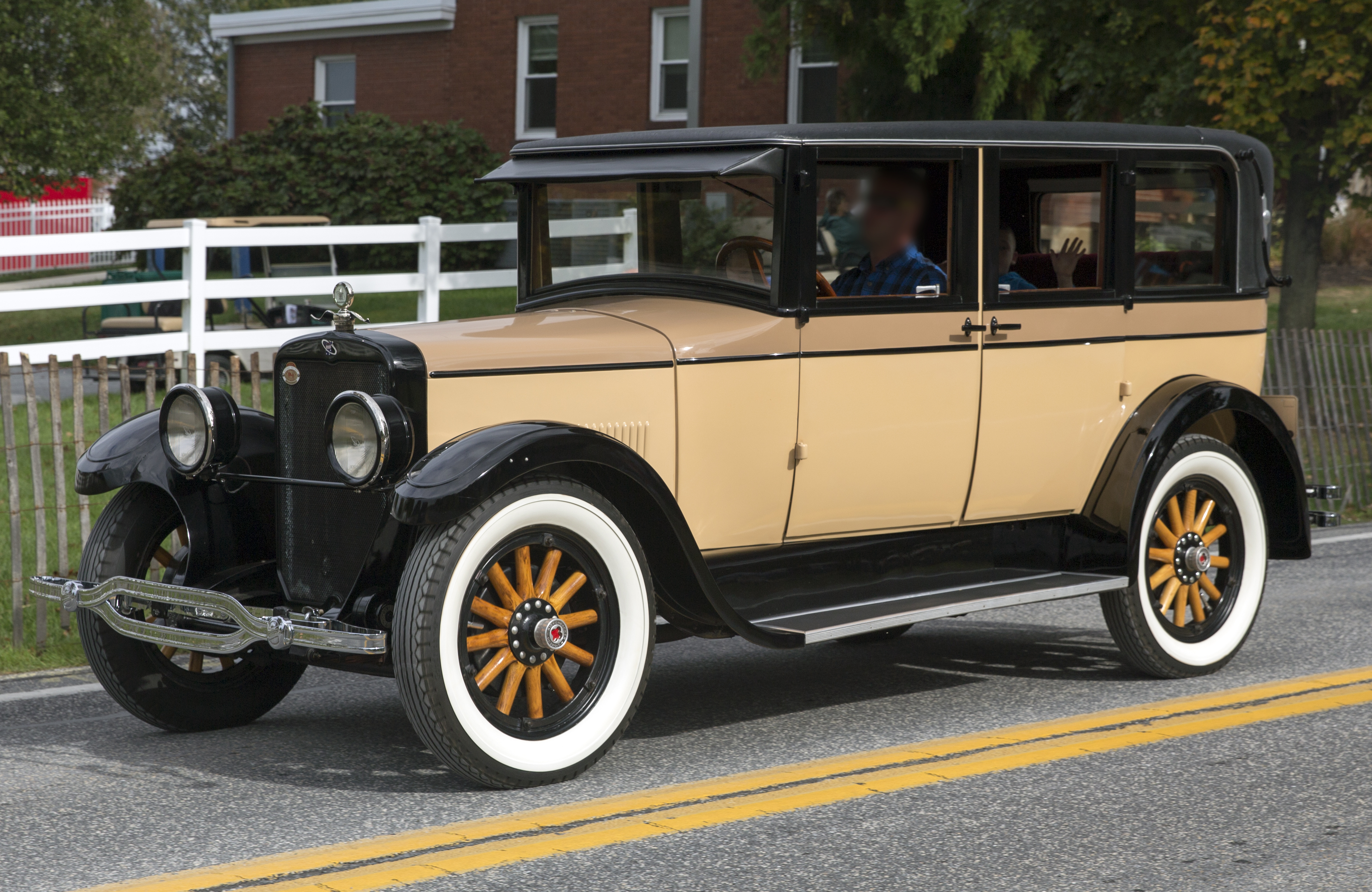
1925 Rickenbacker D6 Sedan

The company made sporting coupés, touring cars, sedans, and roadsters. Four-wheel inside brakes were introduced in 1923. Prices in 1923 ranged from $1,485 for a phaeton to $1,985 (equivalent to $37,510 in 2025) for a sedan.

Several automobile companies began using four-wheel brakes but some companies not offering them began a promotion campaign suggesting they were unsafe, which probably hurt the new Rickenbacker company's sales. The death of Walter Flanders in an automobile accident in 1923 slowed company momentum as well.

In 1924 a coach-brougham enclosed body style was introduced that would grow to represent 60% of Rickenbacker sales. The six-cylinder engine was up-rated to 60-hp and was joined in 1925 by an 4,401cc eight-cylinder engine developing 80-hp. The model was named Vertical Eight Super Fine which referred to the advanced proprietary engine and the high quality of the cars.

Eddie Rickenbacker resigned from the company in 1926 due to internal discord in the company's leadership. Although 1927 saw new models, designated the 6-70, 8-80, and 8-90, Rickenbacker cars had increased in price and sales were poor. Before the company closed down due to bankruptcy in 1927, more than 27,000 cars had been built.

The manufacturing equipment was sold to Audi and transported to Germany, which was somewhat ironic since Rickenbacker renounced his supposed German heritage (he was actually of Swiss ancestry) in light of World War I. This transaction was reflected in Audi Zwickau and Dresden models, using six- or eight-cylinder Rickenbacker engines.

== Advertisements ==
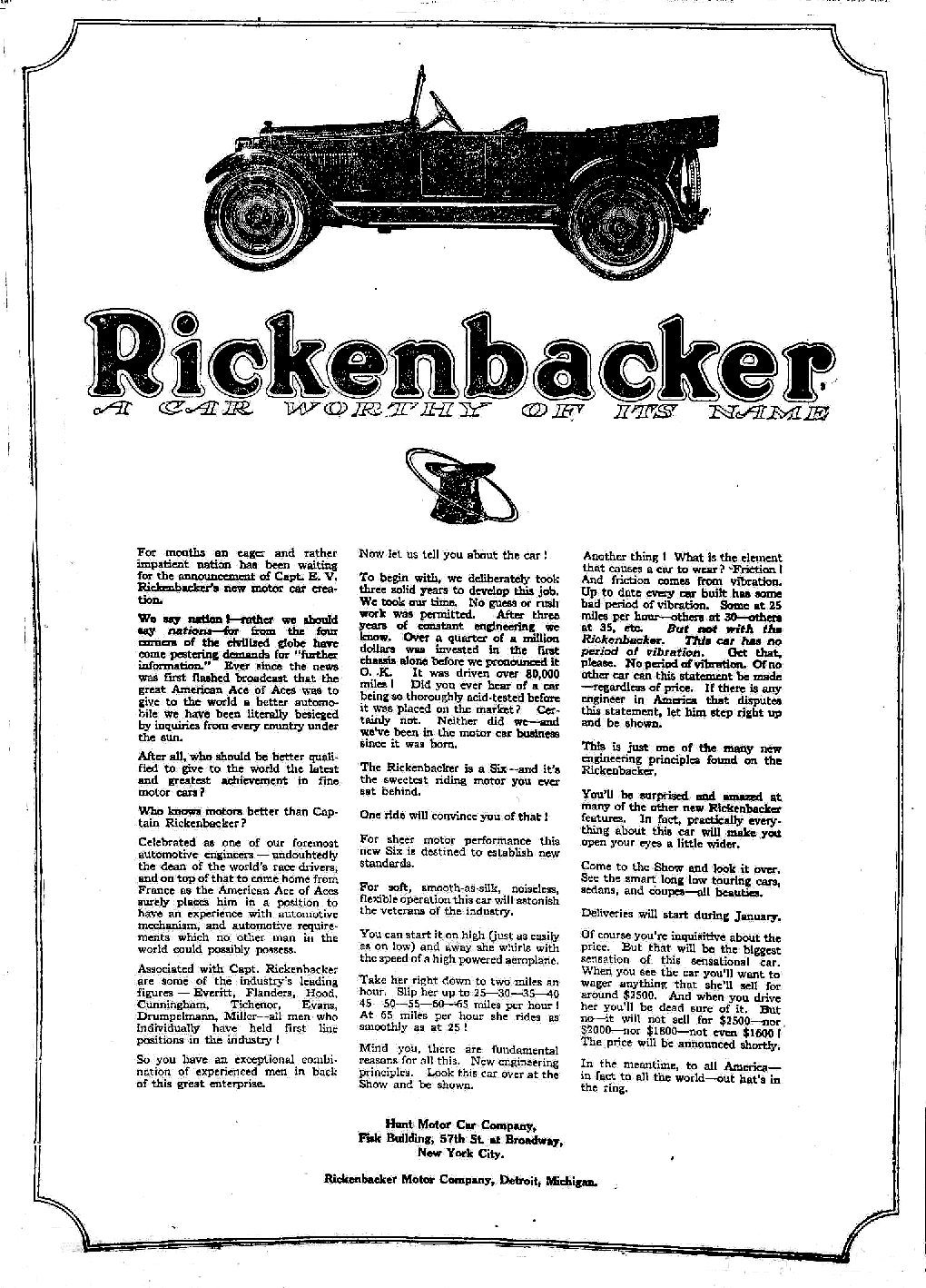
1922 advertisement in the New York Tribune

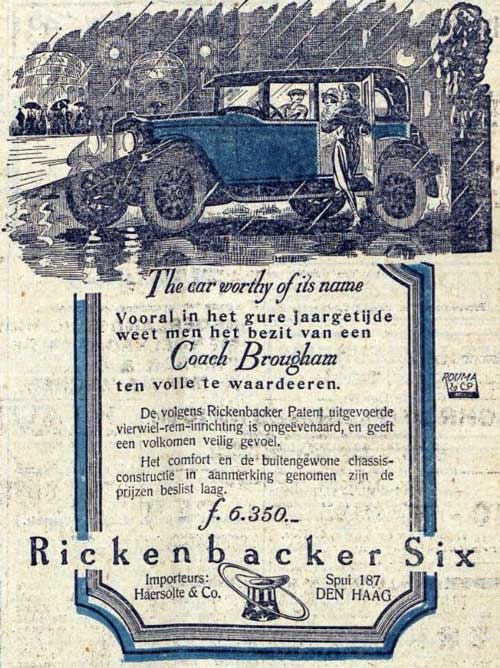
1924 advertisement in the Netherlands
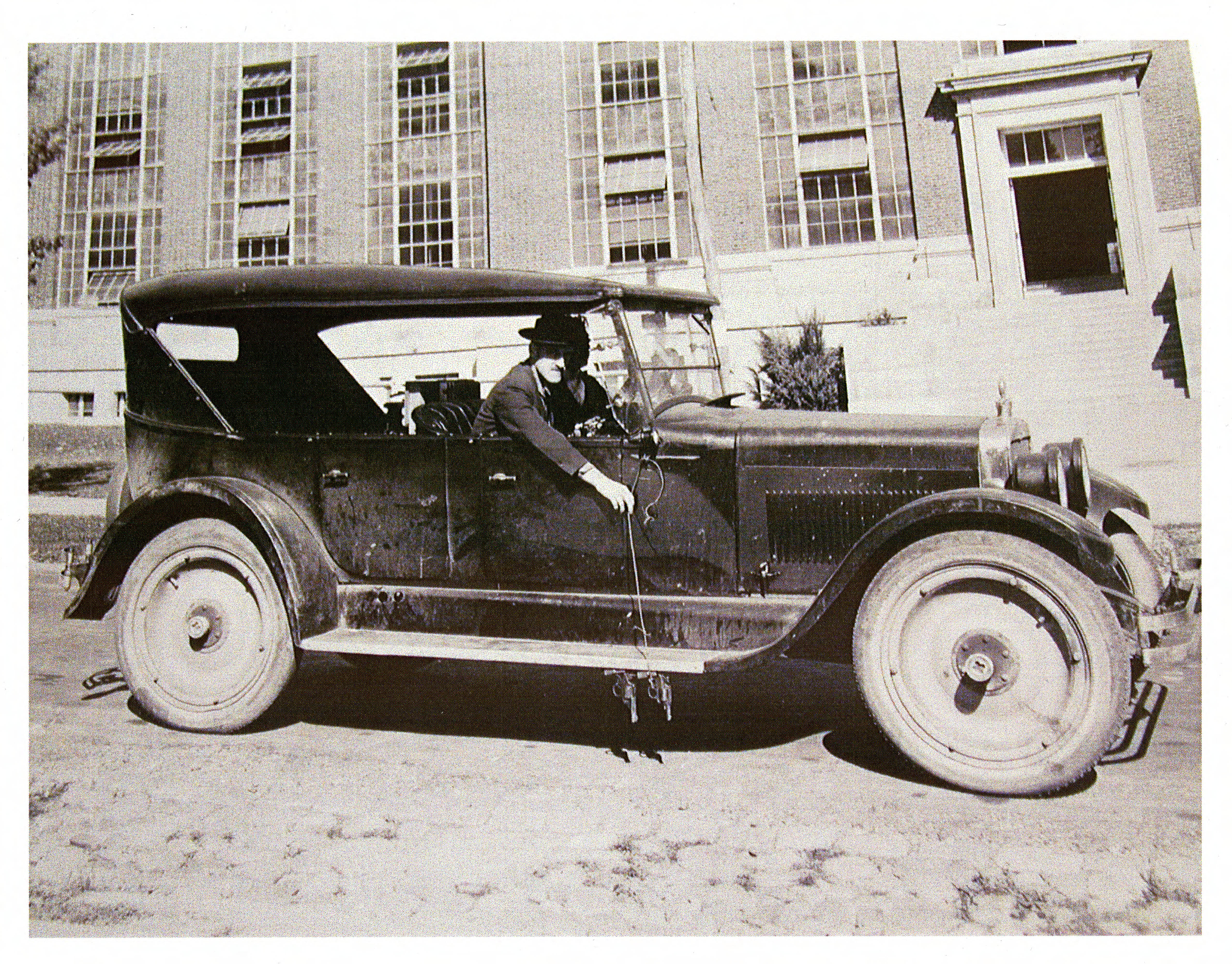
Measuring a motorist reaction time with four wheel braking using two pistols

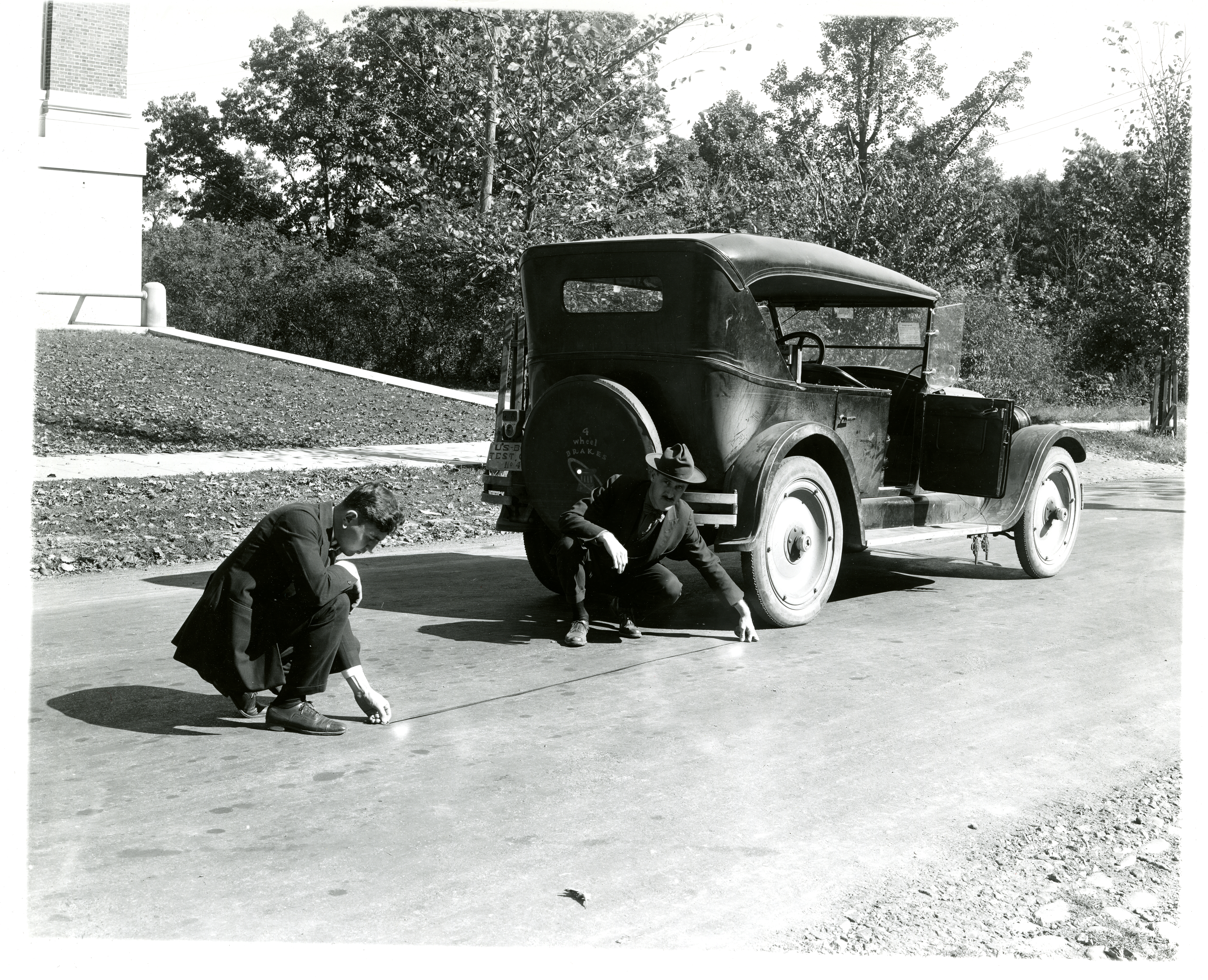
Measuring a motorist reaction time with four wheel braking

== In popular culture ==
- A 1924 model was featured prominently in the 1960 "Mr. Bevis" episode of The Twilight Zone.

== See also ==
- Homer B. Roberts
