= William E. Metzger =

American automotive dealer (1868–1933)

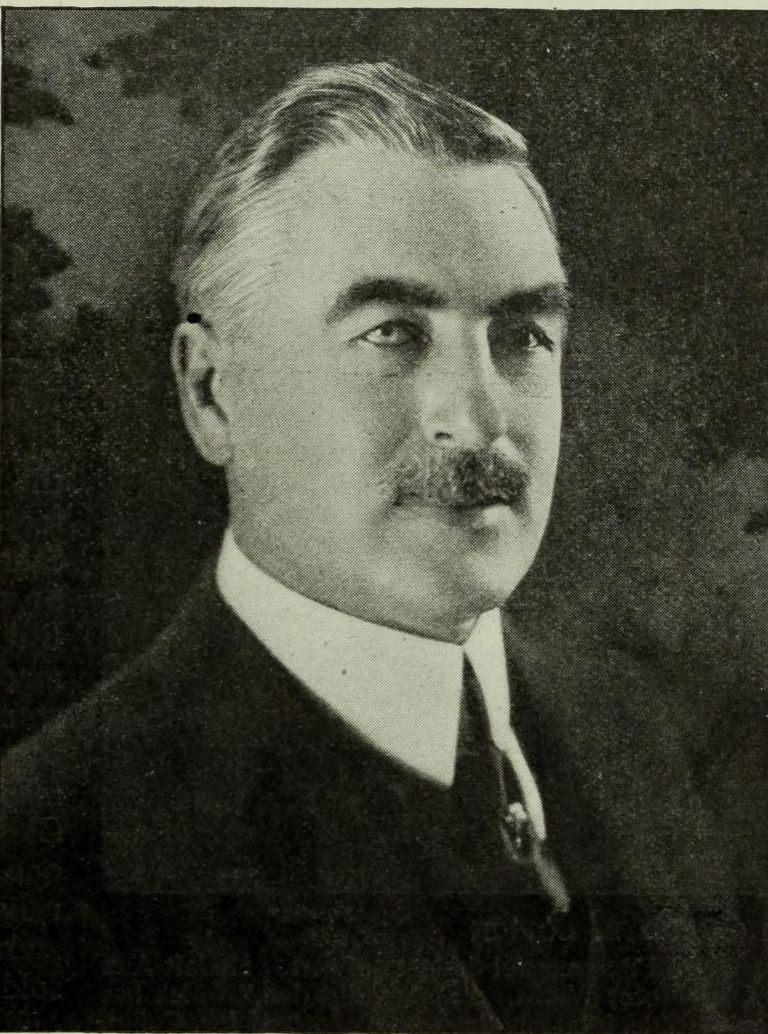
- Born: September 30, 1868; Peru, IL
- Died: April 11, 1933 (aged 64)
- Occupations: Founder of multiple early automotive companies, including Cadillac Automobile Company and E-M-F Company

William Ernest Metzger (September 30, 1868 – April 11, 1933) was an automotive pioneer and salesman from Detroit. He opened one of the first automobile dealerships in the United States and participated in the early development of several automobile companies, including the Cadillac Automobile Company and the E-M-F Company, in which the "M" stands for his name.

== Early life ==
William Metzger was born in Peru, Illinois, in 1868. At the age of 10 he moved to Detroit with his father and later graduated from Detroit High School in 1885. He immediately got a job at Hudson & Symington furniture (owned by J. L. Hudson).

As a young man, Metzger became enamored of bicycle riding, becoming the first vice president of Detroit's Wheelman's Club and finishing a number of 100-mile bicycle rides. Soon his hobby became his business: in 1891, Metzger joined Stanley B Huber to open Huber & Metzger, a bicycle shop located in the center of downtown Detroit. The store soon became one of the largest in the country, and dealt directly with suppliers in England.

== Automobiles and Cadillac ==
In 1895, Metzger attended the world's first automobile show in London. Impressed with what he saw, he went on to visit the factories of Gottlieb Daimler and Karl Benz, then the leading automobile manufacturers in the world (albeit with less than 200 each). He returned to Detroit convinced of the automobile's future, and immediately sold his share in Huber & Metzger. Metzger built the first U. S. automobile retail showroom, which opened 7 June, 1897, selling Waverley electric cars. The following year, Metzger added steamers, then gasoline-powered cars built by various companies. In 1899, Metzger started selling automobiles built by Oldsmobile; in June, Metzger sold the first automobile built by the company. In 1897, Oldsmobile produced four models, so Metzger couldn't have sold the first Oldsmobile unless it was one of the 1897 models.

In 1899, Metzger helped organize the Detroit Auto Show, only the second of its kind. The next year, he helped stage the New York Auto Show in New York's Madison Square Garden.

He was promoter & organizer of the first auto race in Detroit in 1901, at the Detroit Driving Club, a premier harness race track. It was an all-day affair, with over 8,000 spectators, and many races for different classes of cars, starting with a parade from downtown to the track. This was the race where Henry Ford beat Alexander Winton, a top racer and manufacturer of cars from Cleveland, with the Sweepstakes car, that was the prototype for Cadillac. A year later, in October 1902, he promoted a five-mile race, known as the Manufacturers' Challenge Cup, which was a planned Ford-Winton rematch. Despite a strong challenge from Winton, Barney Oldfield easily won with Ford’s 999, taking the $200 prize. It set a speed record at the Detroit Driving Club track, in Grosse Pointe Township, and went on to tour America, and score many other victories. Subsequent to this, Ford was finally able to draw in the backers to start his 3rd company, the modern day Ford Motor Company.

In 1900, he organized the Northern Manufacturing Company. Two years later, Metzger was one of the people who organized the Cadillac Motor Car Co. In 1903, with only three cars produced, Metzger took orders for 2700 cars at the New York Auto Show. The 1903 production of Cadillacs outstripped every other manufacture in the US save Oldsmobile. In 1905, Cadillac reorganized, merging with Leland & Faulconer; Metzger obtained 3000 shares of the merged company. Metzger stayed at Cadillac as sales manager until 1908, but was looking for new challenges.

== E-M-F ==
In that year, Metzger acquired controlling interest in the Northern Automobile Co, and Northern merged with the Wayne Automobile Company, controlled by Byron Everitt and Walter E. Flanders, to form E-M-F (Everitt-Metzger-Flanders) Company. The company arranged for Studebaker to market their cars. In 1909, EMF-Studebaker produced almost 8000 cars, making it the fifth largest auto maker in the US. However, although E-M-F was growing (it would produce 26,000 automobiles in 1911, second only to Ford), Metzger was unhappy with the partnership with Studebaker. In mid-1909, Metzger left the company, taking Byron Everitt and a $362,500 settlement with him.

With the money, Metzger and Everitt began the Metzger Motor Car Co, producing a car (called the Everitt) that was substantially similar to E-M-F's model. Metzger again used his sales skills, and the first year's production of 2500 Everitts were pre-sold before the first one rolled off the assembly line.

With Everitt and Metzger gone, things were unsettled at E-M-F. Despite strong sales, infighting was rampant, and in 1912 Walter Flanders left, joining Metzger and Everitt. The three partners, together again, recapitalized their firm, renaming it the Flanders Motor Company. However, the new company was strapped for cash, and began failing almost immediately. In late 1912, Flanders financially juggled the company, selling Flanders to the United States Motor Company, and heading the new company. Metzger and Everitt, however, took their profits from the sale and left.

== Later years ==
After the dissolution of Flanders, Metzger founded Columbia Motors as their vice president from 1917 to 1924. He also became affiliated with numerous other automotive companies including Wills Sainte Claire and Federal Motor Truck Co. He also was appointed to the executive committee of the American Automobile Association and was elected president of the Detroit Board of Fire Commissioners.

In 1921, Everitt, Metzger, and Flanders reunited once again to produce the Rickenbacker (in partnership with Eddie Rickenbacker). However, the company never really got off the ground. Profits were low or nonexistent, and the company was dealt a blow by the death of Walter Flanders in an automobile accident in 1923. The company limped along for a few years, but in 1926 Rickenbacker, disgusted with the constant bickering, resigned. Other company officers left, and Rickenbacker Motors closed for good in 1927.

In the late 1920s, Metzger turned to aircraft. He had been a good friend of the Wright brothers, and felt the US needed more airplane manufacturing. In 1926, he helped Edward Stinson form the Stinson Aircraft Company. The next year, he organized the first All-American Aircraft Show in Detroit. In 1929, he organized the Cadillac Aircraft Co. The company built technically superior aircraft, but the onset of the Great Depression hurt the company.

As the Great Depression started, William Metzger's health began to decline. He was incapacitated for four years and succumbed to heart attack on April 11, 1933.
