= Havers (automobile) =

Defunct American motor vehicle manufacturer

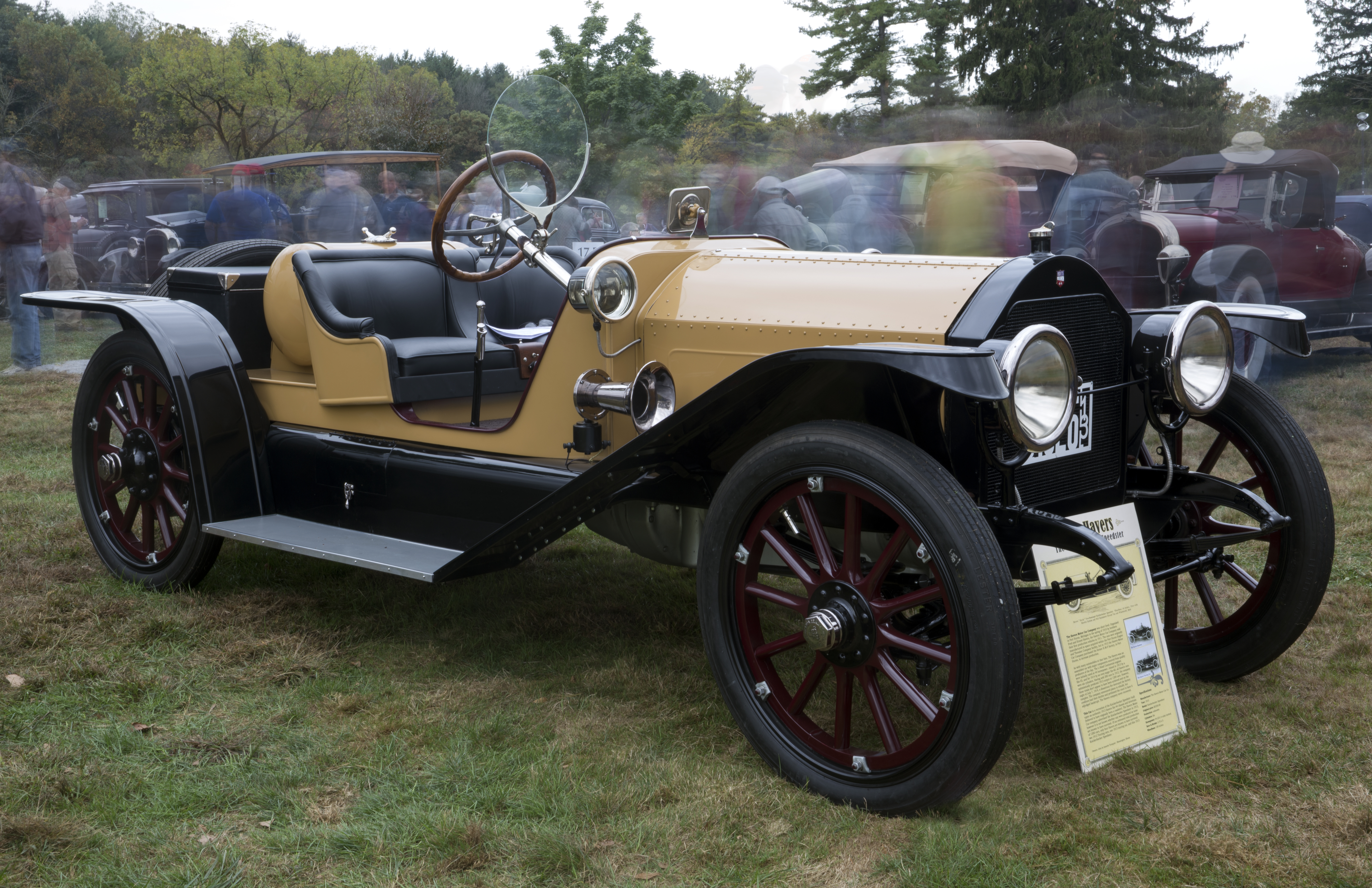
1913 Havers Six-44 "Knickerbocker Speedster"

The Havers was an American automobile built in Port Huron, Michigan by the Havers Motor Car Company from 1911 until 1914. The company was established by brothers Fred and Ernest Havers in 1910, with the first cars being manufactured within the Port Huron Engine & Thresher Company's premises. In 1912, Havers bought the old E-M-F factory (also in Port Huron) and moved production there. The factory suffered a disastrous fire on 7 July 1914, destroying almost everything apart from the offices. While originally planning to resume production within a month, Havers was unable to sway their creditors who forced the company into bankruptcy.

The Havers was conventional in design, except for a long chassis. All were equipped with L-head six-cylinder engines built by Continental, the 1914 engine being of 6.2 L capacity producing 55 hp (41 kW). The 1913 Model 6-55 Speed Car with two passengers sold for $2,250. In September 1913, the 1914 Havers Six-60 was introduced. It was largely unchanged from the preceding Six-55, aside from having a bored and stroked engine. The windshield and fenders were also redesigned, along with numerous other detail improvements.

== Models ==
Model(year)	Engine	HP	Bore x Stroke	Wheelbase
Six (1911)	331 cu in (5,430 cc) inline-six	44	3 3/4 in × 5 in (95.3 mm × 127.0 mm)	115 in (2,921 mm)
Six-44 (1912)	331 cu in (5,430 cc) inline-six	36/44	3 3/4 in × 5 in (95.3 mm × 127.0 mm)	122 in (3,099 mm)
Six-44 (1913)	331 cu in (5,430 cc) inline-six	44	3 3/4 in × 5 in (95.3 mm × 127.0 mm)	122 in (3,099 mm)
Six-55 (1913)	377 cu in (6,178 cc) inline-six	55	4 in × 5 in (101.6 mm × 127.0 mm)	128 in (3,251 mm)
Six-44 (1914)	331 cu in (5,430 cc) inline-six	40	3 3/4 in × 5 in (95.3 mm × 127.0 mm)	122 in (3,099 mm)
Six-60 (1914)	421 cu in (6,899 cc) inline-six	60	4 1/8 in × 5 1/4 in (104.8 mm × 133.4 mm)	128 in (3,251 mm)

== Bibliography ==
- Georgano, G.N.; Andersen, Thorkil Ry (1969). The Complete Encyclopedia of Motorcars, 1885 to Present. New York: E.P. Dutton – via Internet Archive.
