= Liberty Motor Car =

Vintage era car

Liberty Motor Car Company
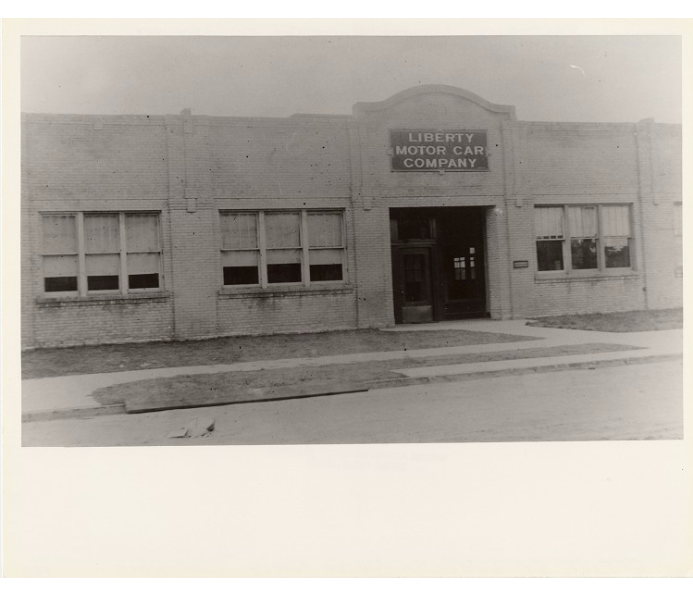
- Liberty Motor Car Company 1st Factory

Overview
- Production: 1916-1923

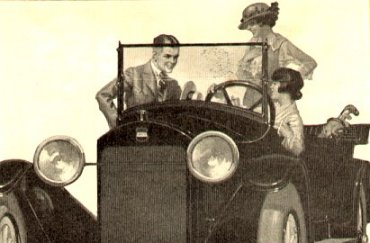
1919 Liberty Motor Car advertisement

The Liberty Motor Car Company was a vintage era United States automobile maker based in Detroit, Michigan from 1916 to 1923.

== History ==
Liberty Motor Car Company was started in February 1916 with capital stock of $400,000 to produce medium-priced cars. Percy Owen, vice-president of Saxon was president and R. E. Cole was Engineer. The R.C.H. automobile factory was purchased for production. The Liberty car was introduced at the Hotel Pontchartrain in Detroit in the summer of 1916.

A total of 733 cars were produced in its first year increasing to 11,217 cars in 1921. A new factory was built in 1921 but the expansion along with the Depression of 1920-1921 caused financial issues. Reorganization while under Receivership failed and in September 1923, it was acquired by Columbia Motors. Columbia failed the following year and the plant was sold to Budd Wheel Company.

== Models ==
Only one model named Liberty Six was offered, propelled by a monobloc 3394 cc Continental Motors 6-cylinder engine. In 1921 Liberty began using a new six-cylinder engine of their own design. Open and closed body styles were used. Total production of Liberty Six's was nearly 37,000. Factory prices ranged from $1,095 in 1919 to $2,095 in 1923, equivalent to $39,588 in 2025.

Model (year)	Engine	HP	Wheelbase
10-A (1916)	6-cylinder	23	115 in (2,921 mm)
10-B (1917–1920)	6-cylinder	25	123 in (3,124 mm) (115 in (2,921 mm) 18–20)
10-C;D (1921–1923)	6-cylinder	56	117 in (2,972 mm)

== See also ==
- Former Liberty Motor Car Company headquarters building (photograph and information)
- 1920 Liberty Model 10-C (photograph and information)
