= De Luxe =

American automobile

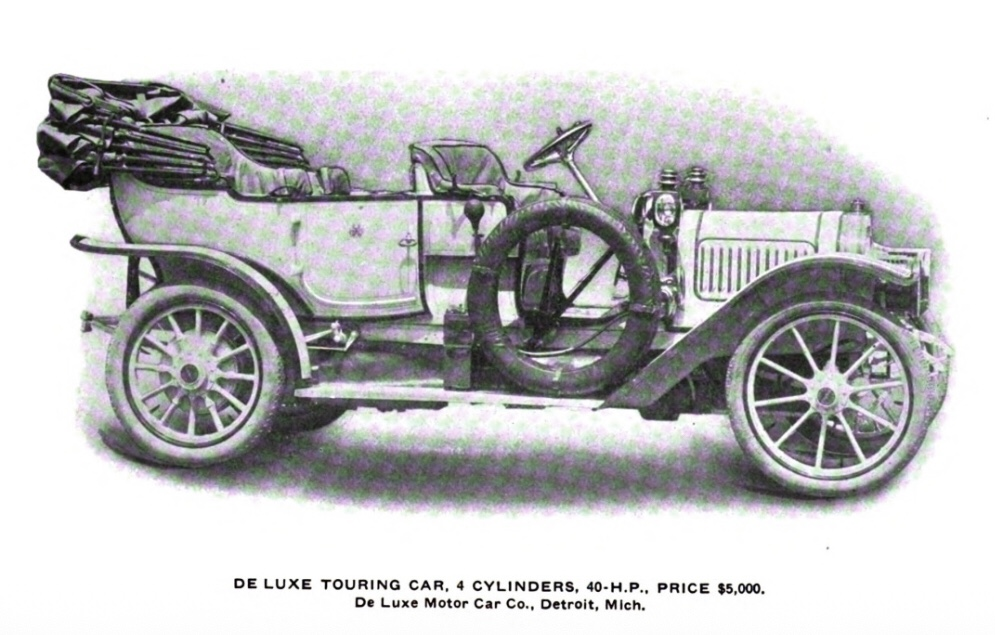
De Luxe 40 hp (1907-1908)

The De Luxe was an American automobile manufactured in 1907 by the De Luxe Motor Car Company of Detroit, Michigan. The De Luxe was a high-priced vehicle for its day, retailing for around $5000 (equivalent to $172,768 in 2025). De Luxe took over the factory belonging to the Kirk Manufacturing Company, maker of the Yale automobile in Toledo, Ohio, in 1906. Soon after, De Luxe moved to a brand new facility on a 15-acre (61,000 m^{2}) site on Clark Street at Jefferson Avenue in Detroit. After producing fewer than 100 cars in 1908, the company was acquired by the E-M-F Company in 1909. The factory was used by E-M-F to build the Flanders 20. E-M-F was acquired by Studebaker in 1910, who continued to produce automobiles in Detroit until its operations were moved to South Bend, Indiana, in the 1920s.

== See also ==
- Pontiac marketed cars under the name "De-Luxe"
