= E-M-F Company =

Defunct American motor vehicle manufacturer

Studebaker E-M-F 30
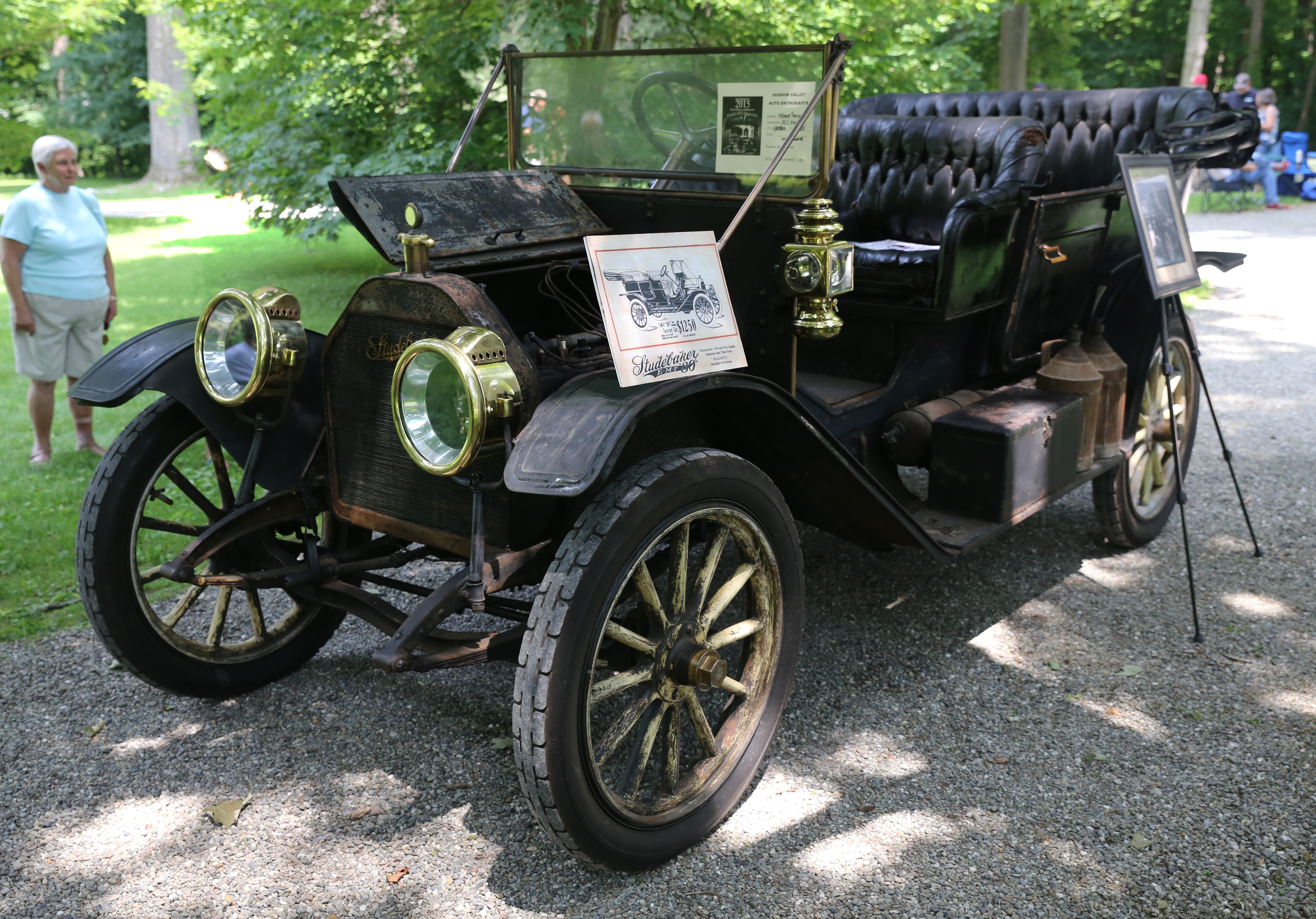
- 1911 Studebaker E-M-F "30" Touring Car

Body and chassis
- Layout: FR

Powertrain
- Engine: 4-cylinder
- Transmission: 3-speed sliding gear manual

Dimensions
- Wheelbase: 106 in (2,700 mm)

The E-M-F Company was an early American automobile manufacturer that produced automobiles from 1909 to 1912. The name E-M-F was gleaned from the initials of the three company founders: Byron Forbes "Barney" Everitt (a custom auto-body builder from Detroit), William Ernest Metzger (formerly of Cadillac), and Walter Emmett Flanders (who had served as Henry Ford's production manager).

== Origins ==
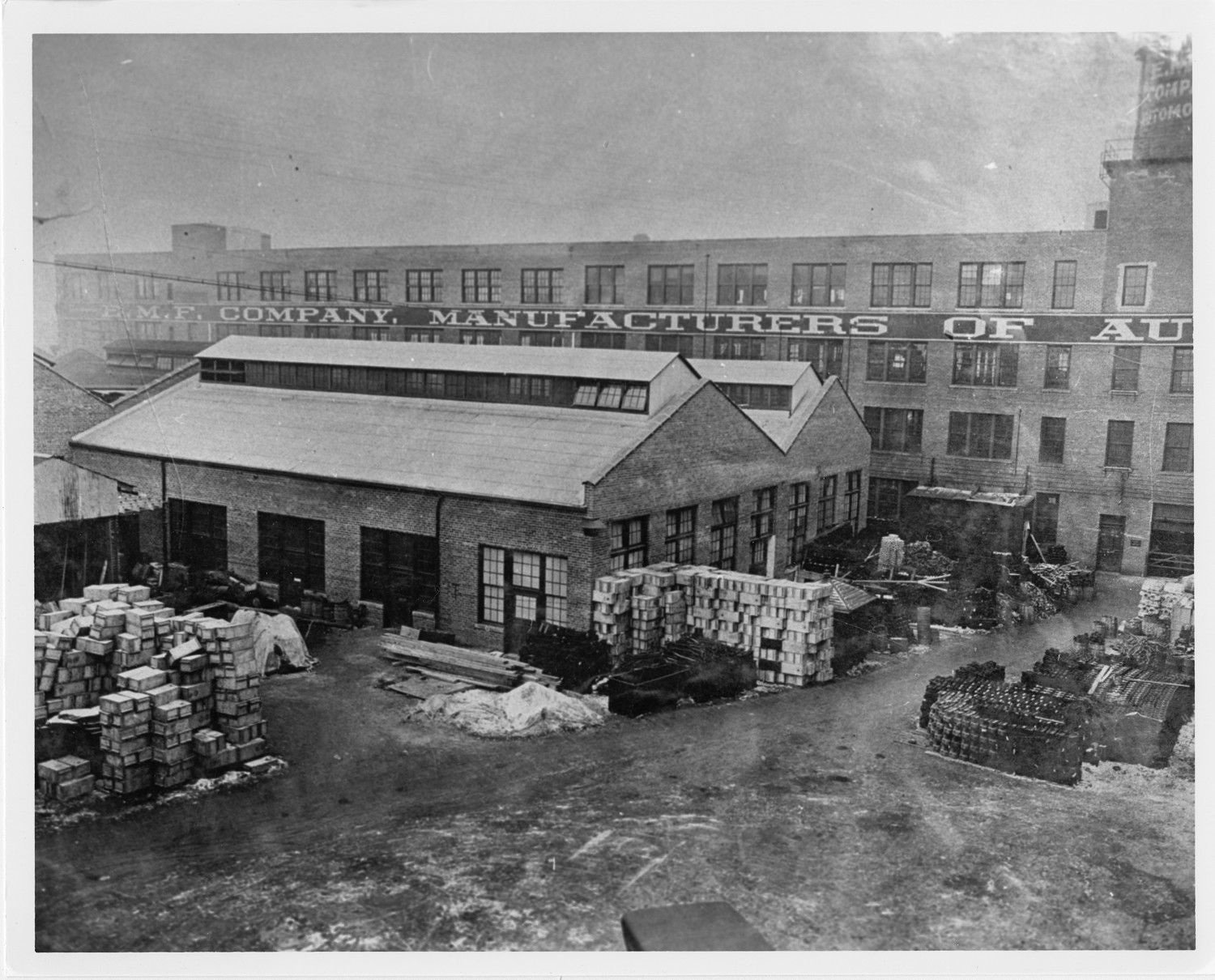
8x10 black and white, sepia-toned photograph of the E.M.F. Company factory exterior with supply yard

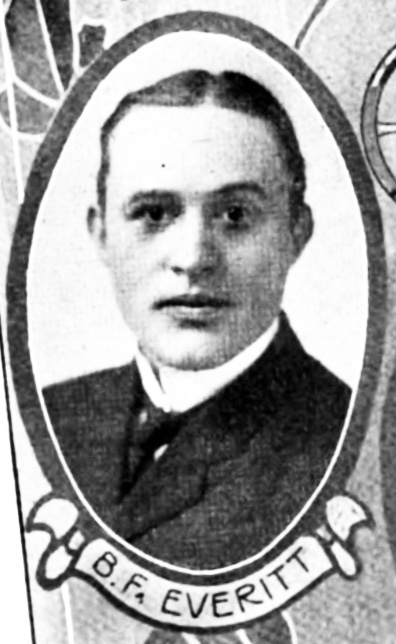
Byron F. „Barney“ Everitt (1872-..)

=== Everitt ===
Byron Forbes "Barney" Everitt was born in 1873 at Ridgetown, Ontario, and learned wagon-building in Chatham, Ontario. In the early 1890s he worked for carriage-maker Hugh Johnson in Detroit. In 1899 he started his own coachwork company, with orders from Ransom Olds, and then Henry Ford. In about 1904 his own first assembled car was the Wayne. The car model bearing his name was the Everitt, 1909-1912.

=== Metzger ===
William E. Metzger was born 1868 in Peru, Illinois. He was one of the first car salesmen, a buyer and reseller and, in the late 1890s, established possibly the first United States automobile dealership, in Detroit. He was a key figure in the Association of Licensed Automobile Manufacturers, and also promoted early races at Grosse Pointe. In 1902 he became affiliated with the Northern Motor Car Company and the same year helped organize Cadillac before taking orders at the New York Automobile Show in January 1903.

=== Flanders ===
Walter E. Flanders was born March 4, 1871, in Waterbury, Vermont. He was a machinist who started with servicing sewing machines during an apprenticeship at Singer Corporation, followed by an association with Thomas S. Walburn in general machining in Cleveland, Ohio, in the late 1890s. An order came from Henry Ford in Detroit to the company for a thousand crankshafts, and Ford was impressed by the response. Then in the early 1900s Flanders again worked with Walburn, this time for Ford at the Ford Piquette Avenue Plant at the corner of Piquette and Beaubien Streets in Detroit. Flanders became manager of manufacturing at the plant, where he also worked with the two future vice-presidents in charge of manufacturing, Peter E. Martin, and Charles E. Sorensen. Flanders was replaced by those two when he resigned abruptly on 21 April 1908. Flanders' skill was in setting up and effecting timesaving procedures and methods at the plant, where engineers had developed the Model T in late 1907, which then began production in 1908, and led eventually to invention of the new moving assembly line to meet skyrocketing demand for the Model T in 1910.

== Overview ==
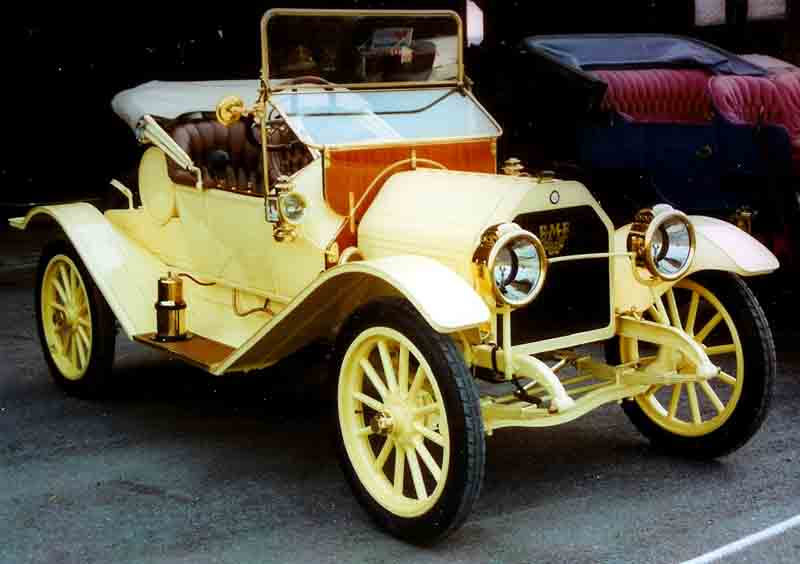
E-M-F Model 30 Roadster 1912

E-M-F Model 30 delivery wagon (1910)

In 1909, E-M-F bought the Detroit plant of the De Luxe company and began production of E-M-F cars. E-M-F produced several models of its own design and contracted to sell them through Studebaker wagon dealerships. At one point, E-M-F vehicles outproduced all but Ford in the American market.

Late in 1909, E-M-F established a Walkerville, Ontario, branch plant to produce the E-M-F 30 and Flanders 20. · E-M-F had a third plant in Port Huron, which was sold to the Havers Motor Car Company in 1912.

Shortly afterward, E-M-F was bought out by Studebaker, which formed Studebaker Canada, and rebadged E-M-F's products: the E-M-F as the Studebaker 30 and the Flanders as the Studebaker 20. Sales of these rebadged models continued through the end of 1912.

== Production models ==
- Everitt Metzger Flanders E-M-F 30
- Everitt Metzger Flanders 20 S

=== Baby E-M-F ===
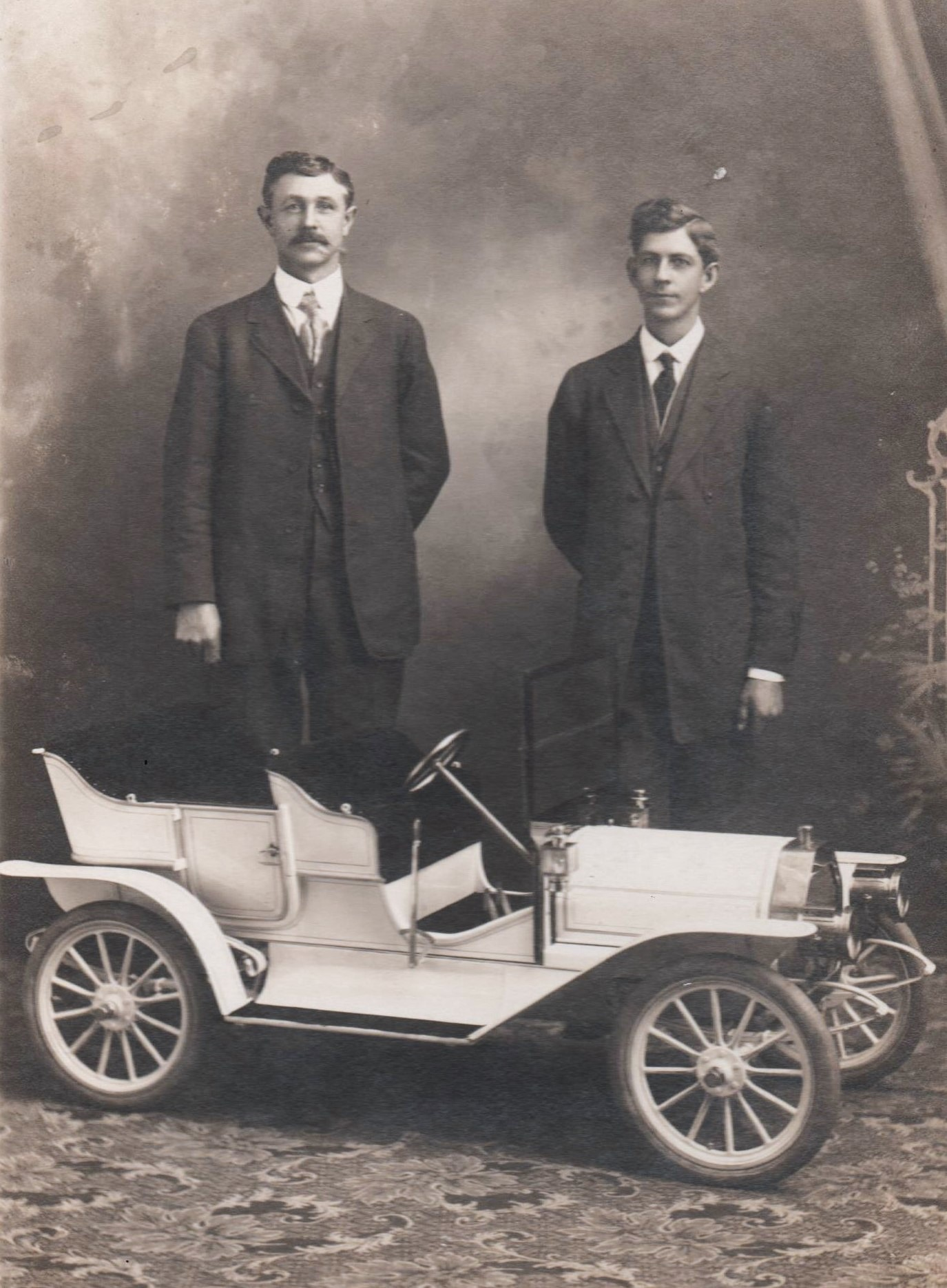
Baby E-M-F built by the Swanson Bros. of Stromsburg, Nebraska, c.1910

Brothers Nels E. and Alex Swanson of Stromsburg, Nebraska took it upon themselves to make a miniature version of an existing car in order to gain notoriety for their skills as automotive engineers. In 1910, they started building a miniature version of an E-M-F 30 Touring Car. The car was exhibited at the Chicago Auto Show in February 1910 and was soon dubbed the "Baby E-M-F". It is considered to be the first scaled-down miniature car ever produced.

== Takeover ==
Studebaker's president Fred Fish (son-in-law of John M. Studebaker), being unhappy with E-M-F's poor quality and lack of management, gained control of the assets and plant facilities (at Detroit and Walkerville, Ontario) in 1910. To remedy the damage done by E-M-F, Studebaker paid mechanics to visit each unsatisfied owner and replace the defective parts in their vehicles at a cost of US$1 million to the company. The E-M-F name continued into 1912 with the Studebaker name becoming more and more prevalent on the cars. In 1913, the E-M-F name was replaced by Studebaker.

Problems aside, E-M-F vehicles had sold well in the growing marketplace. In 1909 E-M-F placed fourth (producing 7,960 vehicles) in total US automobile production, behind that of Ford Motor Company, Buick, and Maxwell, with Cadillac fifth. In 1910 the firm built 15,020 vehicles and again held on to fourth place behind Ford, Buick, and Overland. In 1911, the firm placed second in overall assemblies with 26,827 automobiles produced for the year. In his history of E-M-F, Anthony Yanik stated Studebaker built its strong automotive base "on the shoulders of E-M-F", having "purchased the entire company for an outrageous price in 1910". However, the E-M-F production figures had been underpinned by Studebaker's vast resources, and sales were largely dependent on Studebaker's reputation and marketing network.

Flanders also ran the short-lived Flanders Automobile Company, which produced cars wholly based on previous E-M-F designs. The Flanders company was absorbed into Maxwell Motor Company (Incorporated) which was reorganized out of the assets of the United States Motor Company in 1913.

On June 20, 2005, the E-M-F (and previously Wayne Automobile) Detroit plant on Piquette Avenue and John R. Street caught fire and within a few hours it was gone. The five-alarm fire nearly spread to the Ford Piquette Avenue Plant where Henry Ford built the first Model T.

== See also ==
- Brass Era car
