= Everitt =

Defunct American motor vehicle manufacturer

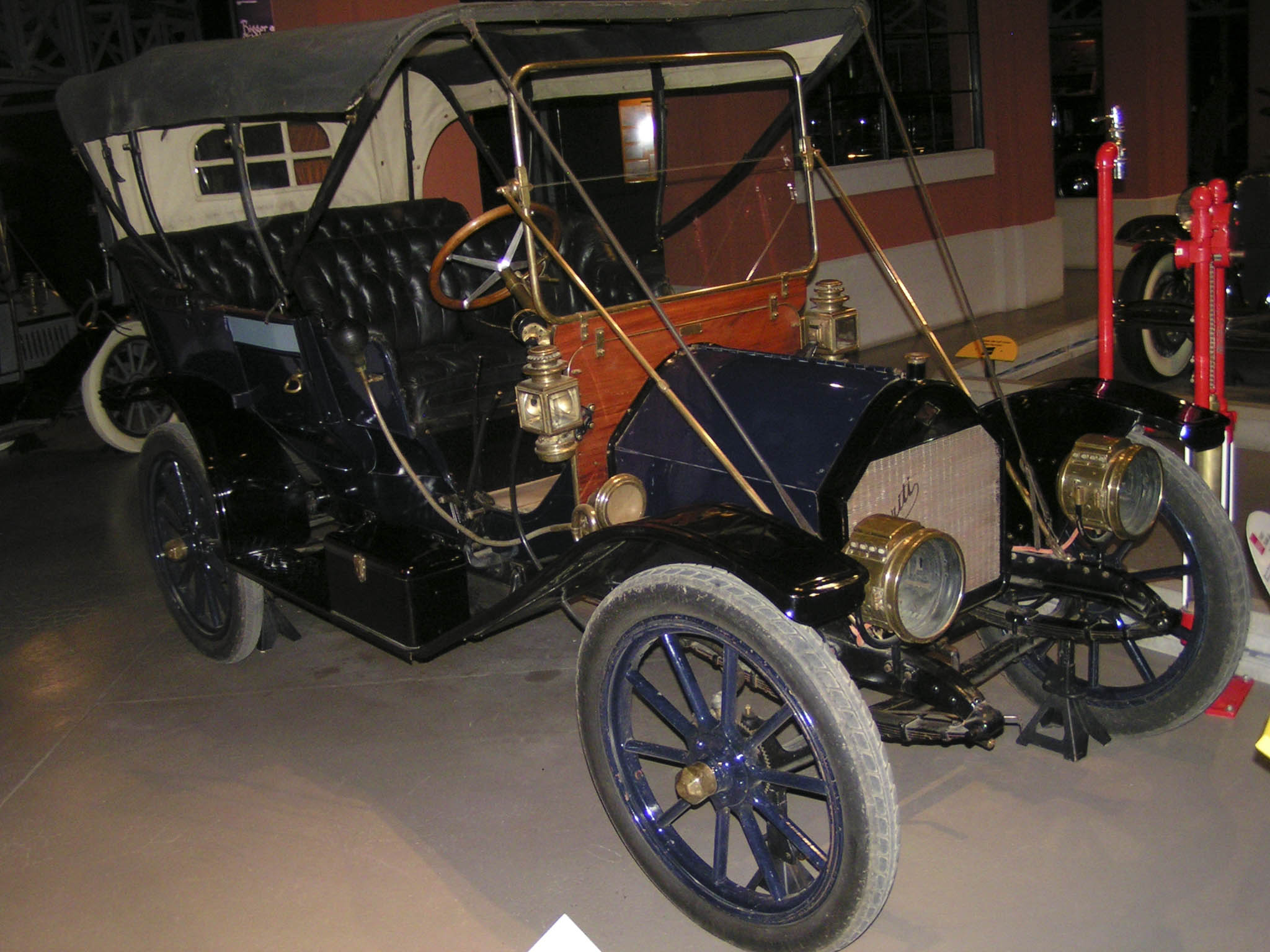
1910 Everitt Four-30 Touring Car

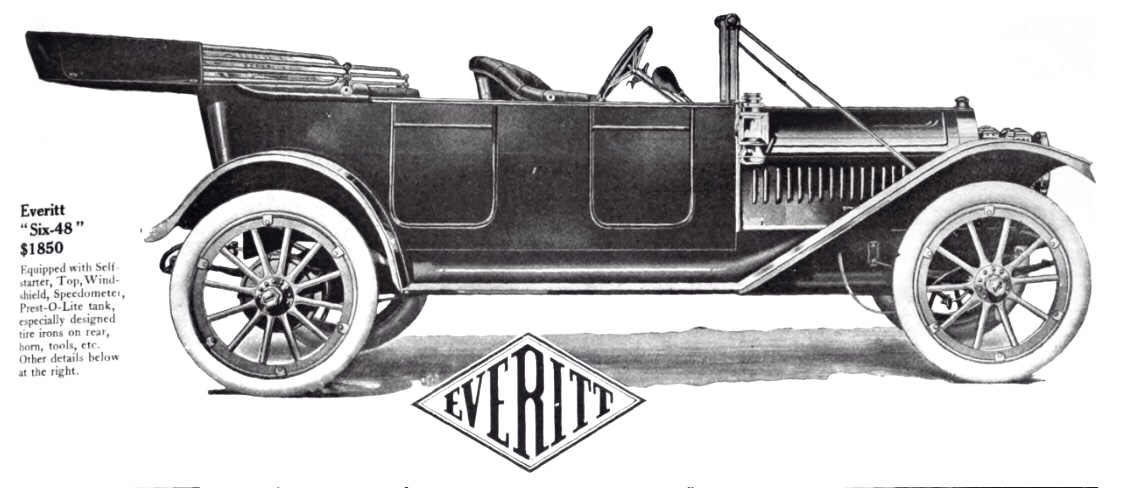
Everitt Six-48 (1912)

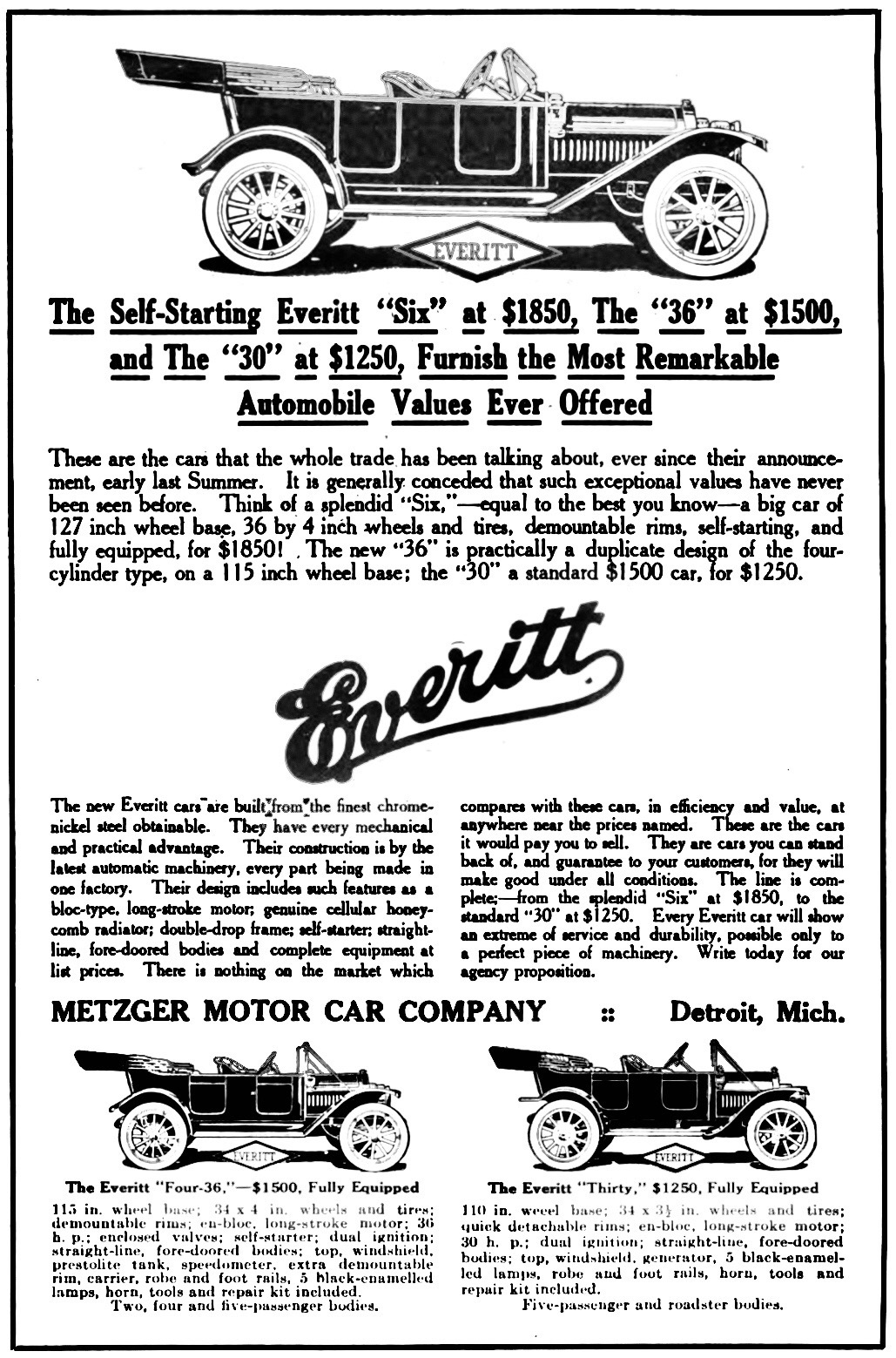
Everitt advertisement (1912)

The Everitt was an American automobile manufactured from 1909 until 1912 by the Metzger Motor Car Company in Detroit, Michigan.

== Model overview ==
Year	Model	Engine	Rated power	Wheelbase in / cm	Body style	List price
1910	Four-30	4 cyl. 238.8 c.i.	30 hp (A.L.A.M.)	110 / 2790	2-passenger runabout	$1350
1910	Four-30	4 cyl. 238.8 c.i.	30 hp (A.L.A.M.)	110 / 2790	5-passenger touring	$1350
1911	Four-30	4 cyl. 238.8 c.i.	30 hp (A.L.A.M.)	110 / 2790	2-passenger runabout	$1500
1911	Four-30	4 cyl. 238.8 c.i.	30 hp (A.L.A.M.)	110 / 2790	5-passenger touring	$1350
1911	Four-30	4 cyl. 238.8 c.i.	30 hp (A.L.A.M.)	110 / 2790	5-passenger Fore-Door touring	$1400
1911	Four-30	4 cyl. 238.8 c.i.	30 hp (A.L.A.M.)	110 / 2790	4-passenger coupe	$1750
1911	Four-36	4 cyl. 238.8 c.i.	30 hp (A.L.A.M.)	115 / 2920	2-passenger runabout	$1500
1911	Four-36	4 cyl. 238.8 c.i.	30 hp (A.L.A.M.)	115 / 2920	5-passenger touring	$1500
1912	Four-30	4 cyl. 238.8 c.i.	30 hp (A.L.A.M.)	110 / 2790	2-passenger runabout	$1250
1912	Four-30	4 cyl. 238.8 c.i.	30 hp (A.L.A.M.)	110 / 2790	5-passenger touring	$1250
1912	Four-36	4 cyl. 238.8 c.i.	30 hp (A.L.A.M.)	115 / 2920	2-passenger runabout	$1500
1912	Four-36	4 cyl. 238.8 c.i.	30 hp (A.L.A.M.)	115 / 2920	5-passenger touring	$1500
1912	Six-48	6 cyl. 358.1 c.i.	48 hp (A.L.A.M.)	127 / 3230	2-passenger runabout	$1850
1912	Six-48	6 cyl. 358.1 c.i.	48 hp (A.L.A.M.)	127 / 3230	4-passenger torpedo	$1850
1912	Six-48	6 cyl. 358.1 c.i.	48 hp (A.L.A.M.)	127 / 3230	5-passenger touring	$1850
1912	Six-48	6 cyl. 358.1 c.i.	48 hp (A.L.A.M.)	127 / 3230	6-passenger touring	$1900

== See also ==
- Brass Era car
