= John Williams Stoddard =

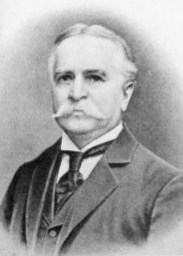
- Born: October 1, 1837; Dayton, Ohio
- Died: September 18, 1917 (aged 79); Dayton, Ohio
- Education: Princeton College; Cincinnati Law School
- Occupation: Manufacturer
- Spouse: Susan Keifer (m. 1861)

John Williams Stoddard (October 1, 1837 – September 18, 1917) was an American manufacturer of agricultural implements and automobile pioneer. He was a cousin of General William Tecumseh Sherman.

== Biography ==
John Williams Stoddard was born in Dayton, Ohio to Henry and Susan (Williams) Stoddard. Henry Stoddard (1788–1869) was a pioneer citizen and distinguished lawyer of Dayton. John was educated in the private schools of Dayton, and spent his freshman and sophomore years at Miami University. He next entered the junior class at Princeton College, where he graduated in the class of 1858. Following his father's profession, Mr. Stoddard graduated from Cincinnati Law School in 1860. He practiced law in Dayton for two years but decided to abandon the legal profession for a business career. On May 7, 1861 John W. Stoddard married Susan Keifer (1841–1921).

In 1862 John Stoddard began the manufacture of linseed oil in partnership with his brother Henry, and Charles G. Grimes, under the firm name of Stoddard & Grimes. That business was continued for three or four years when it was enlarged, and the manufacture of varnishes was added, the firm also dealing by wholesale in paints, oils, window glass, etc., under the name of Stoddard & Company. In 1869, Stoddard sold his interest to his brothers. The company later became part of the Lowe Brothers Company of Dayton.

In 1869, John Stoddard then began the manufacture of agricultural implements in partnership with John Dodds, under the firm name of John Dodds & Company. The Farmers Friend Manufacturing Company was incorporated as a stock company in 1871 as producers of high class agricultural implements constituting a complete line of planting, harvesting and tilling machinery under the Farmers Friend, Excelsior, Monarch brands. This was succeeded by J. W. Stoddard & Company and in turn, in 1884, was incorporated as the Stoddard Manufacturing Company, of which Stoddard was the president and principal stockholder. Their distinctive brand of "Tiger" was a mark of excellence in agricultural machinery the world over. The chief implements made by the Stoddard Manufacturing Company were mowers, hay rakes, press drills, and disc harrows. The best known of these were the famous Tiger Rake, Tiger Harrow, and Havana Press Drill. More than 200,000 of the Tiger Rake had been sold by 1890. In the mid-1890s, they diversified to take advantage of the bicycle craze then sweeping the United States, manufacturing the Tiger (and Tigress), Cygnet, and Tempest lines of bikes until 1898.

His interest in the financial possibilities of transportation was revealed by his involvement as Secretary in the Third Street Railway, five miles (8 km) of urban streetcar rails that ran the full length of Third Street in Dayton, and which gradually acquired other urban rail operators in Dayton. In the 1880s, Stoddard was also Vice President of Milburn, a Toledo, Ohio wagon manufacturer that originally built farm wagons but then evolved to produce bodies for Willys & Pope-Toledo in 1909 and then several models and styles of its own electric vehicles from 1915 to 1923 called the Milburn Light Electric. Milburn was sold to General Motors in 1923.

In 1903, John W. Stoddard and his son Charles (1866–1921), having made a fortune in agricultural equipment, turned to making automobiles. John sent his son to Europe where he toured continental auto manufacturers. In 1904, Stoddard Manufacturing Company was reincorporated as Dayton Motor Car Company and they began the manufacture of the Stoddard-Dayton automobile. It became the second largest employer in Dayton, second only to Barney & Smith, occupying the 68,000-square-foot (6,300 m^{2}) plant at Third and McDonough Streets that had been built for the agricultural implements forerunner in 1871. That landmark stood until 1994.

The Stoddards competed in those years with other local Dayton companies including the Speedwell Motor Car Company, the Dayton Electric Car Company, the Darling Motor Car Company, the Apple Automobile Company, and the Custer Specialty Company, but without question, the Stoddard-Dayton was one of the highest quality automobiles made in its time. In 1909, the Stoddards formed the Courier Car Company (effectively a division of Dayton Motor Car) to manufacture smaller, cheaper automobiles, heavy trucks and taxicabs. The Courier company occupied an earlier Stoddard building at Fourth Street and Wayne Avenue.

A Stoddard-Dayton won the first race at the Indianapolis Motor Speedway in 1909 and was the pace car in 1911 for the first Indianapolis 500. In 1910, the Dayton Motor Car Company was sold to United States Motor Company of Detroit, a rival of General Motors.

John W. Stoddard died in Dayton in 1917. His son and partner Charles Grimes Stoddard died less than four years later and Susan Stoddard, John's wife, died a few months after Charles. The Queen Anne-style Stoddard mansion stood on Grafton Hill overlooking the Great Miami River and the city of Dayton. In 1926, it was razed to make way for the Dayton Masonic Temple (now Masonic Center).

The John W. Stoddard family, including his parents, brothers and children, are interred at Woodland Cemetery, Dayton, Ohio.

== Patents ==
Stoddard used patent protection on his agricultural products. A sample of one of the later patents, issue to his brother E. Fowler Stoddard, is below.

- U.S. patent 322,136 Combined Horse Rake and Tedder, Issued: July 14, 1885
