= Speedwell Motor Car Company =

Defunct American motor vehicle manufacturer

Speedwell
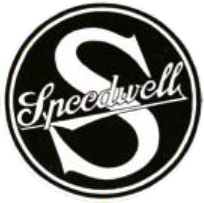
- Speedwell radiator emblem

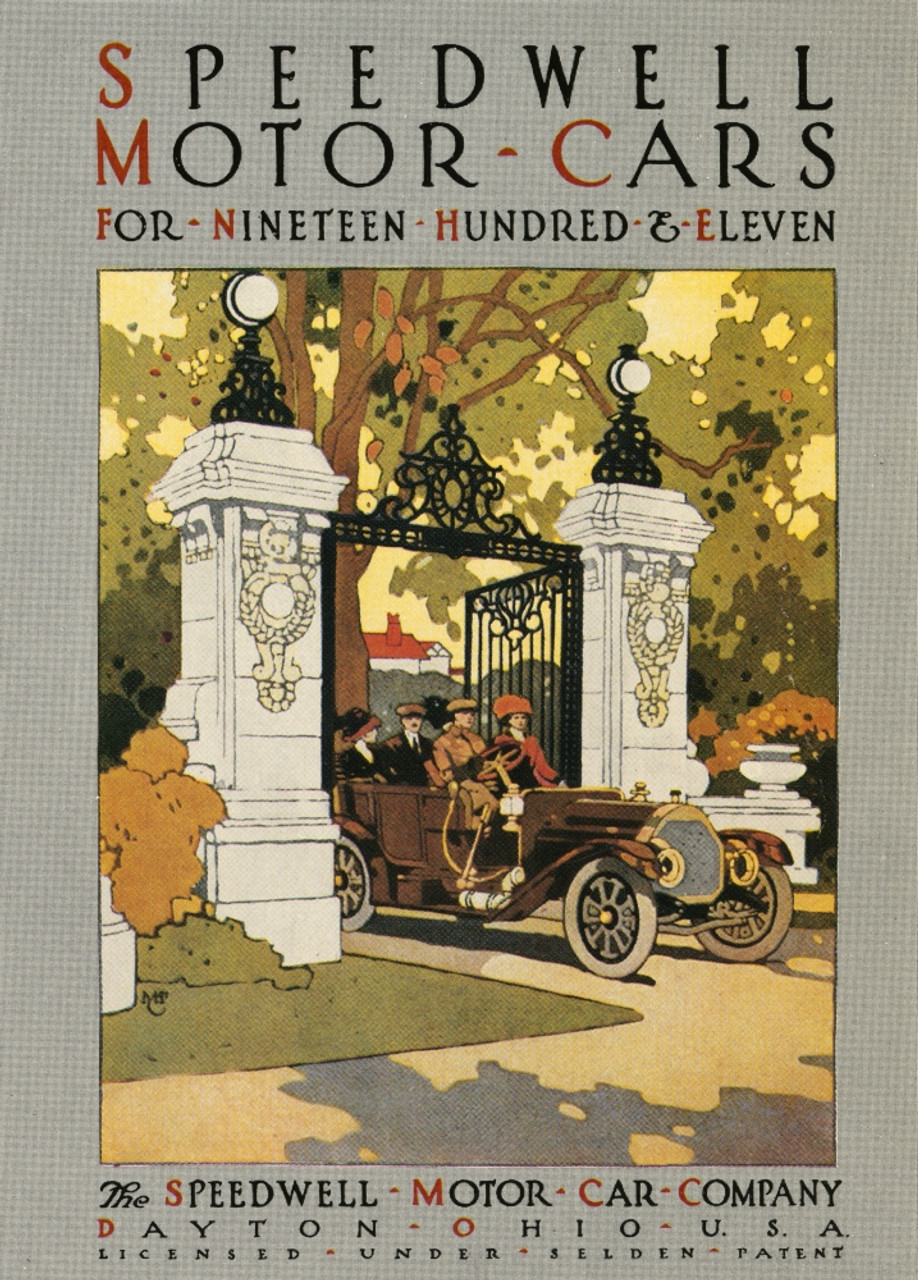
- 1911 Speedwell Motor Car Company catalog cover
- Industry: Automotive
- Founded: 1907; 119 years ago
- Founder: Pierce Schenck
- Defunct: 1915; 111 years ago
- Fate: Bankruptcy
- Headquarters: Dayton, Ohio, United States
- Key people: Pierce D. Schenck, Gilbert J. Loomis, Cyrus E. Mead
- Products: Automobiles
- Production output: 4,000 est. (1907-1914)

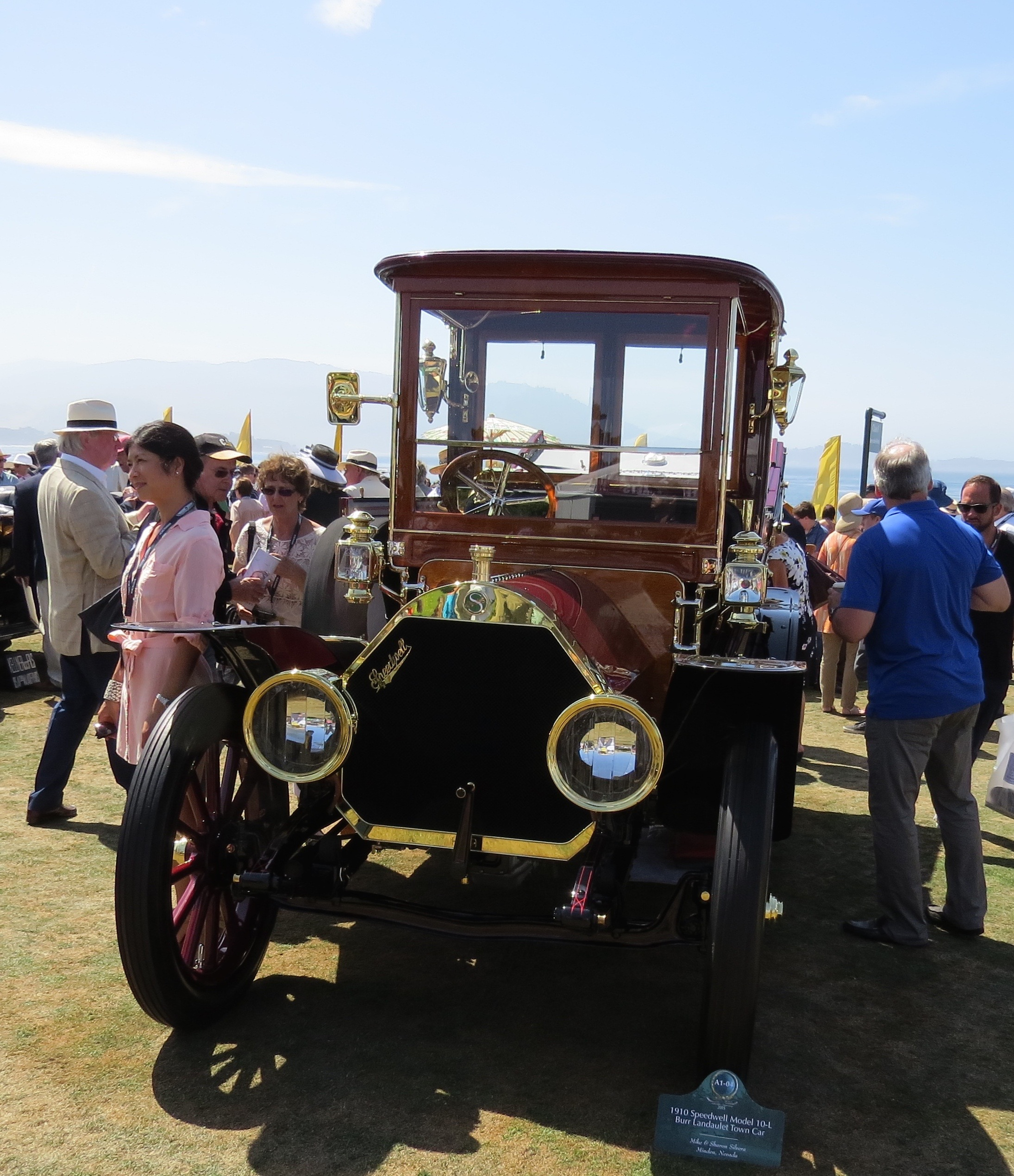
1910 Speedwell Series 10 Burr Landaulet Town Car

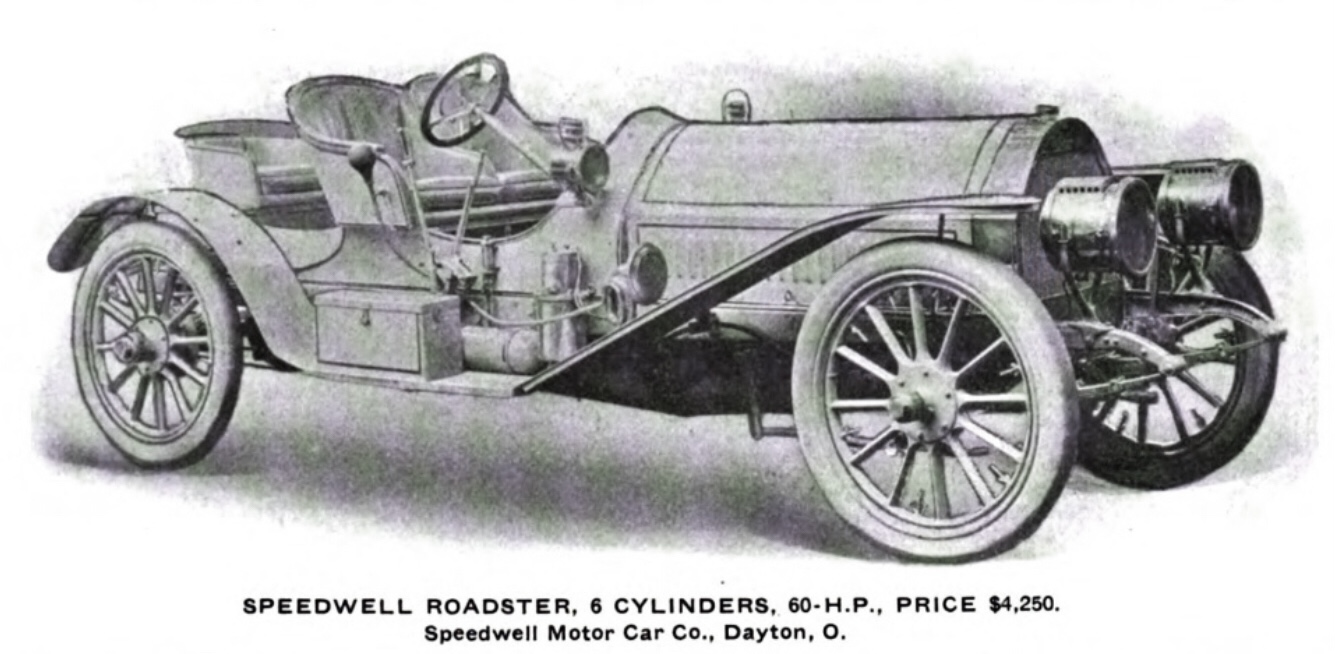
Speedwell Roadster (1908)

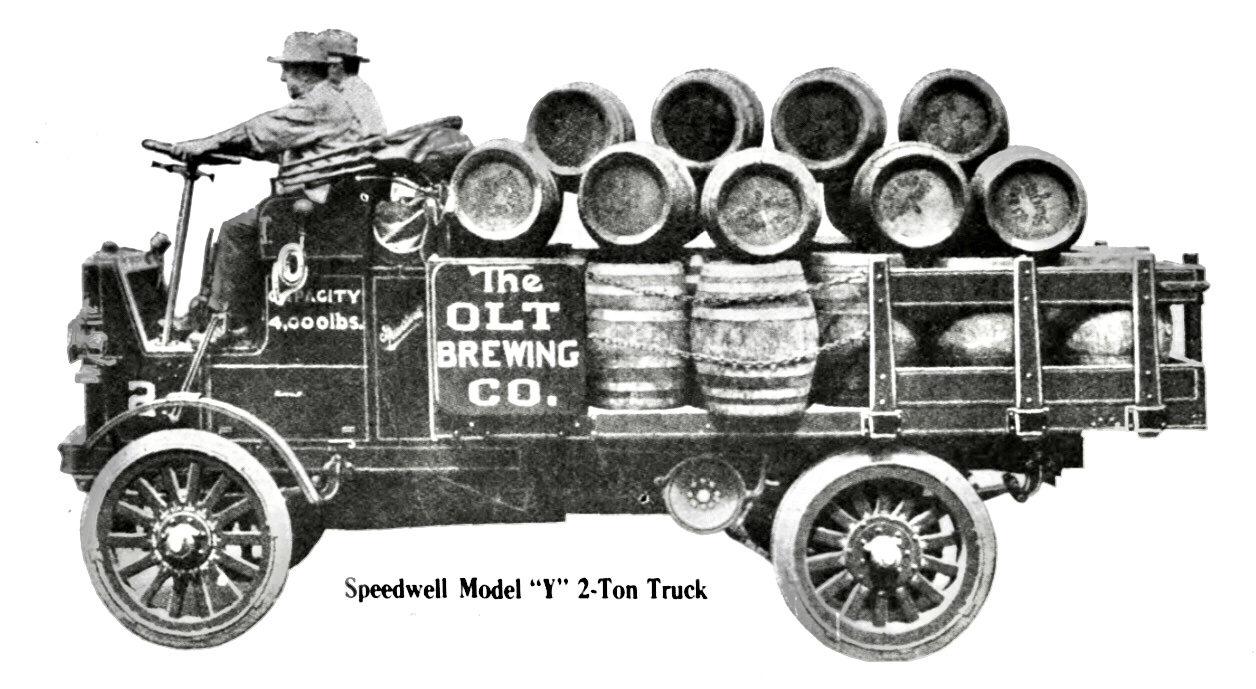
Speedwell Model Y (1914)

1910 Speedwell Semi-Racing Runabout

The Speedwell Motor Car Company was a Brass Era American automobile manufacturing company established by Pierce Davies Schenck that produced cars from 1907 to 1914. The Great Dayton Flood of 1913 greatly damaged the Speedwell factory and inventory, and the company entered receivership in 1915 after having built an estimated 4,000 cars and trucks.

== History ==
Pierce D. Schenck of Dayton established the Speedwell Motor Car Company with a $50,000 capitalization. He hired Gilbert J. Loomis, who had built Loomis cars in Massachusetts, as Chief engineer.

The first Speedwells had Rutenber four and six-cylinder engines on wheelbases of 116 and 132 inches. After the Panic of 1907, the decision was made to build cars on one chassis of 120 inches with a four-cylinder engine built by Speedwell. Production for the 1909 model year production quadrupled from the 25 cars produced in 1907.

Schenck expanded his factory until there were nine buildings. The company rented factory space to the Wright Company to build its airplanes from February to November 1910, while the Wright Company built its own factory building in west Dayton.

From 1909, the Speedwell's base price was $2,500, equivalent to $86,384 in 2025. Advertising stated "It would be folly to pay more," and “It would be unwise to pay less." The Speedwell was a well built car with a dedication to detail. Speedwell was among the earliest companies to market a torpedo and the only one to use concealed door hinges and place the horn under the hood. The one-chassis policy did not prevent the company from offering Speedwells in several body styles, including some evocatively called Cruiser, Duck Boat and Speed Car.

From 1910, Speedwell was manufacturing light and heavy duty delivery trucks as well. Most of the 4,000 Speedwells built during the lifetime of the company were sold from 1909 to mid-1912. In 1911, Speedwell built a closed two-door, dubbed a sedan, which was the first recorded use of the term.

After Pierce Schenck turned his interest to malleable iron and Gilbert Loomis left Dayton, Cyrus E. Mead designed a rotary-valve engine that Speedwell put into production in addition to its standard poppet-valve car, resulting in both types being offered. In 1913, however, Mead was killed in an automobile accident, leaving others, less familiar with the engine, to try to attend to the need for refinements to is design.

In March 1913, the Great Dayton Flood put the Speedwell plant out of action for several months. When deliveries slowed down as a result, and with rotary-valve models not selling well, dealers left in large numbers. Bankruptcy was declared early in 1915.

The Speedwell factory was leased to the Recording and Computing Machines Company and was later sold to the W. M. Pattison Supply Company. The repair parts and business of Speedwell was acquired by the Puritan Machine Company, headed by A. O. Dunk who made a practice of buying failed automobile companies. The factory site later hosted a Delco factory. The Speedwell factory buildings are not extant. About 12 Speedwells are known to be extant.

== Production models ==
- Speedwell Model II F Special
Models and Advertisements

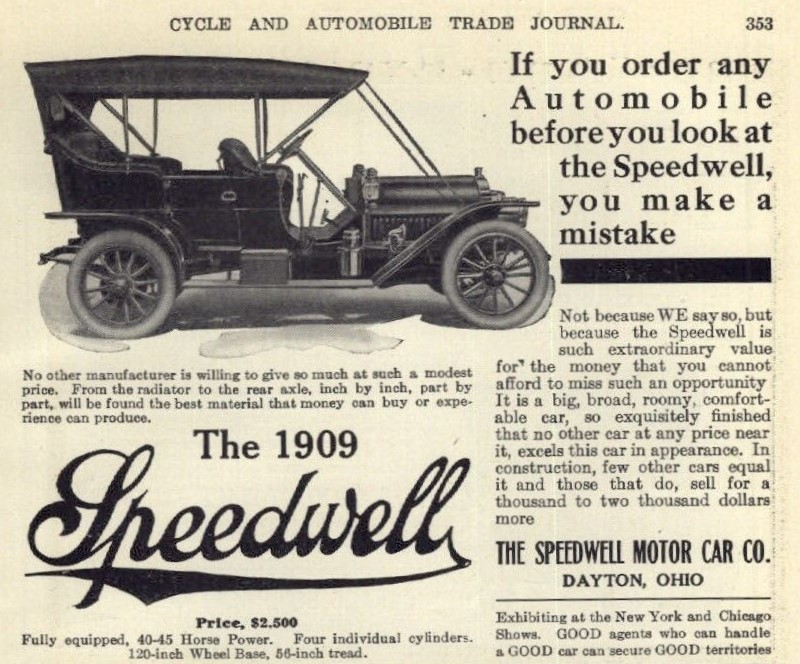
1909 Speedwell advertisement

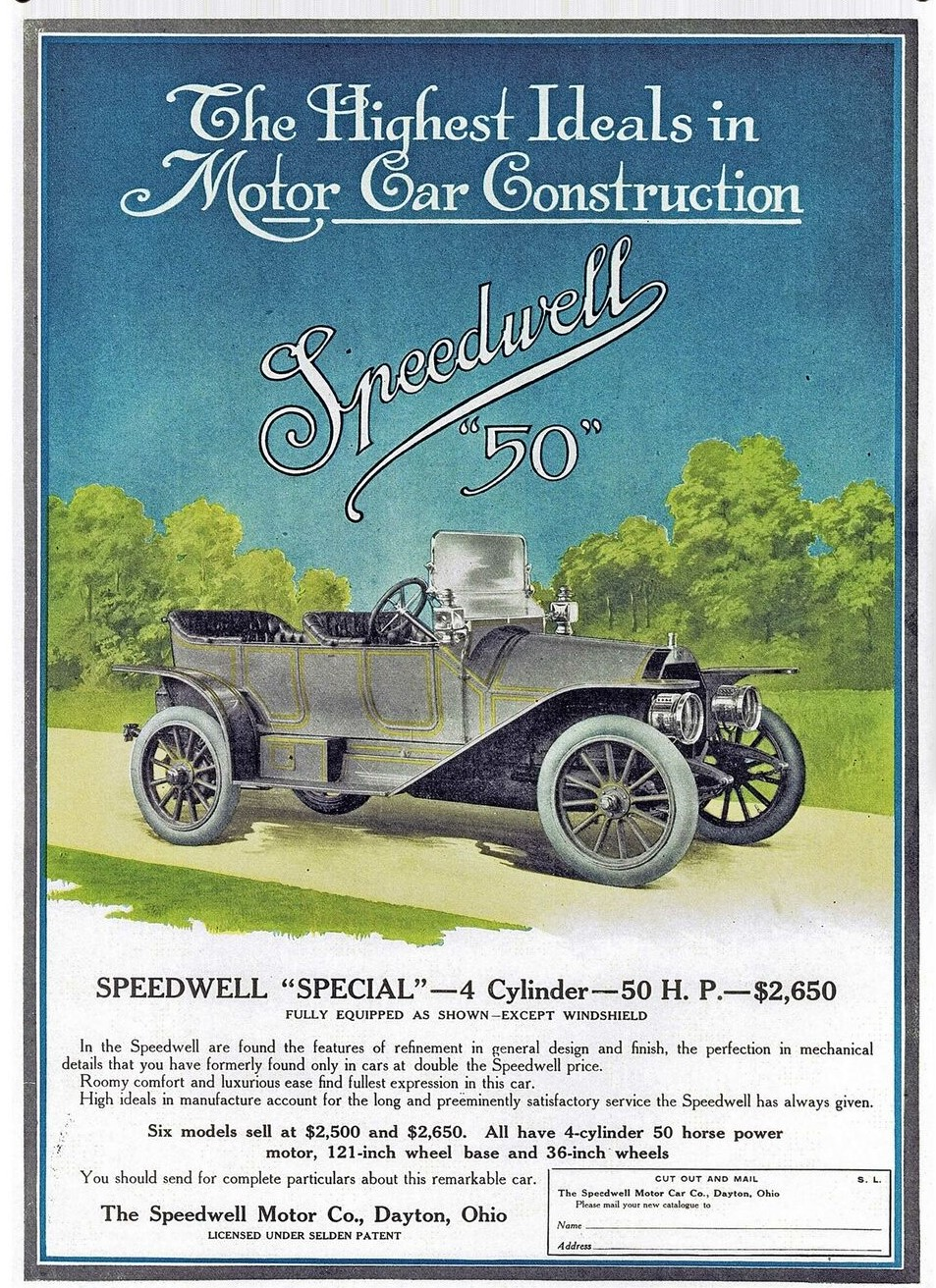
1910 Speedwell 50 Special advertisement

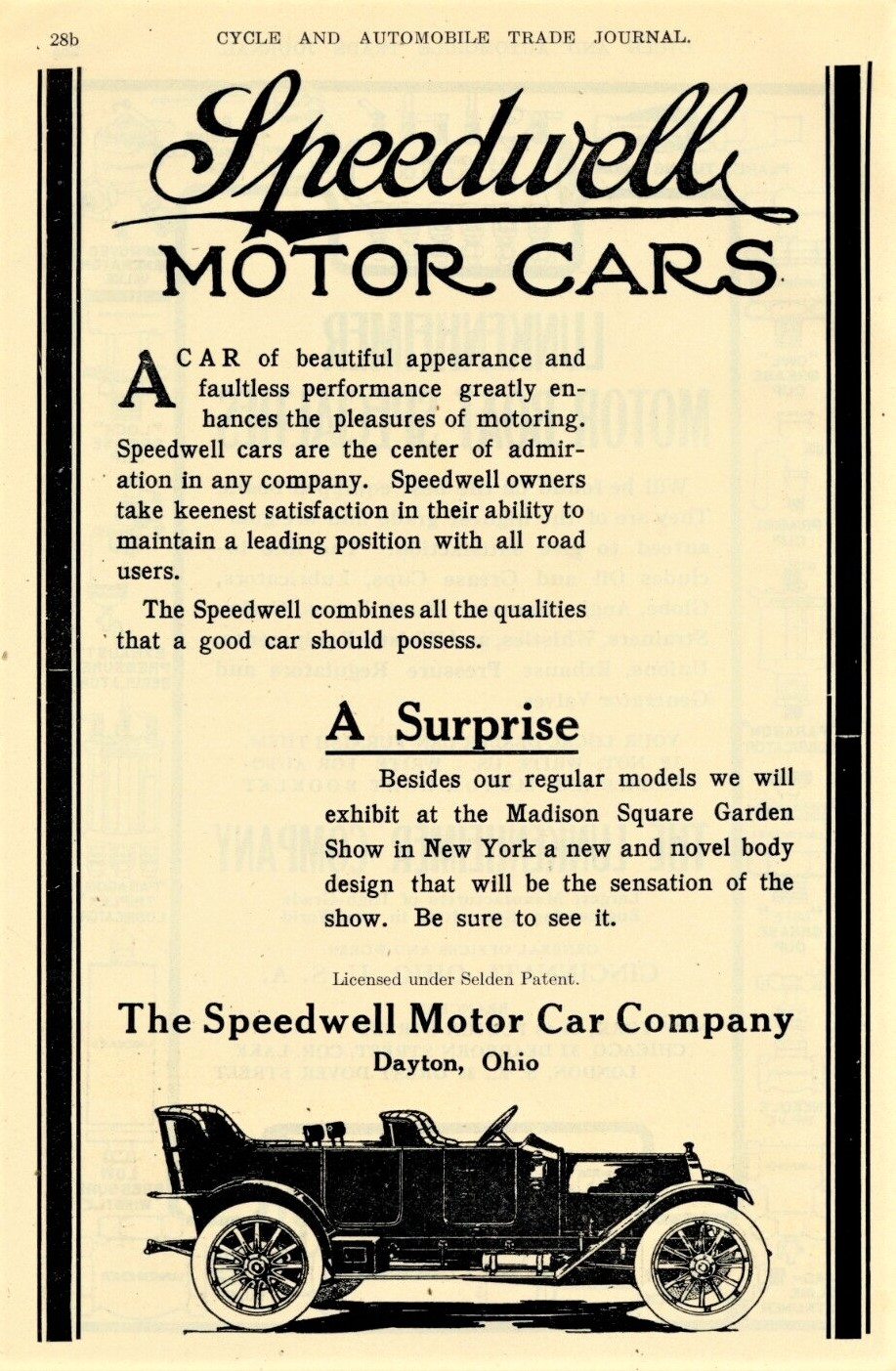
1911 Speedwell advertisement

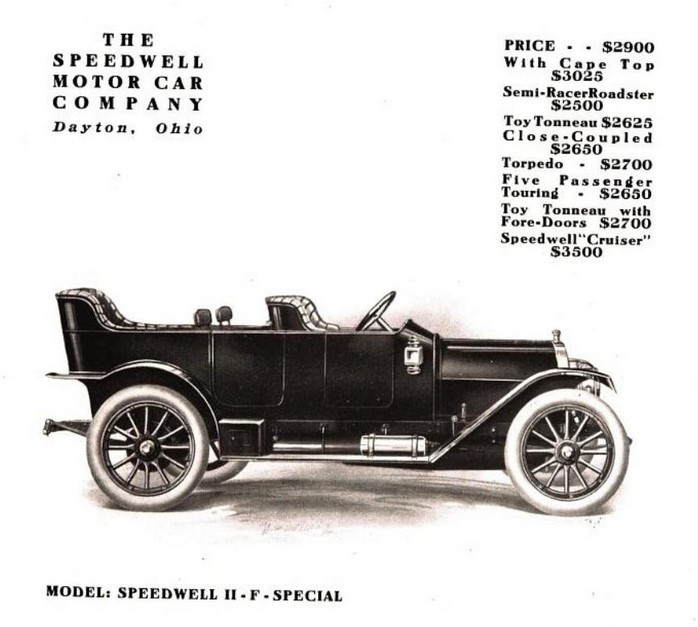
1911 Speedwell Model H - F - Special

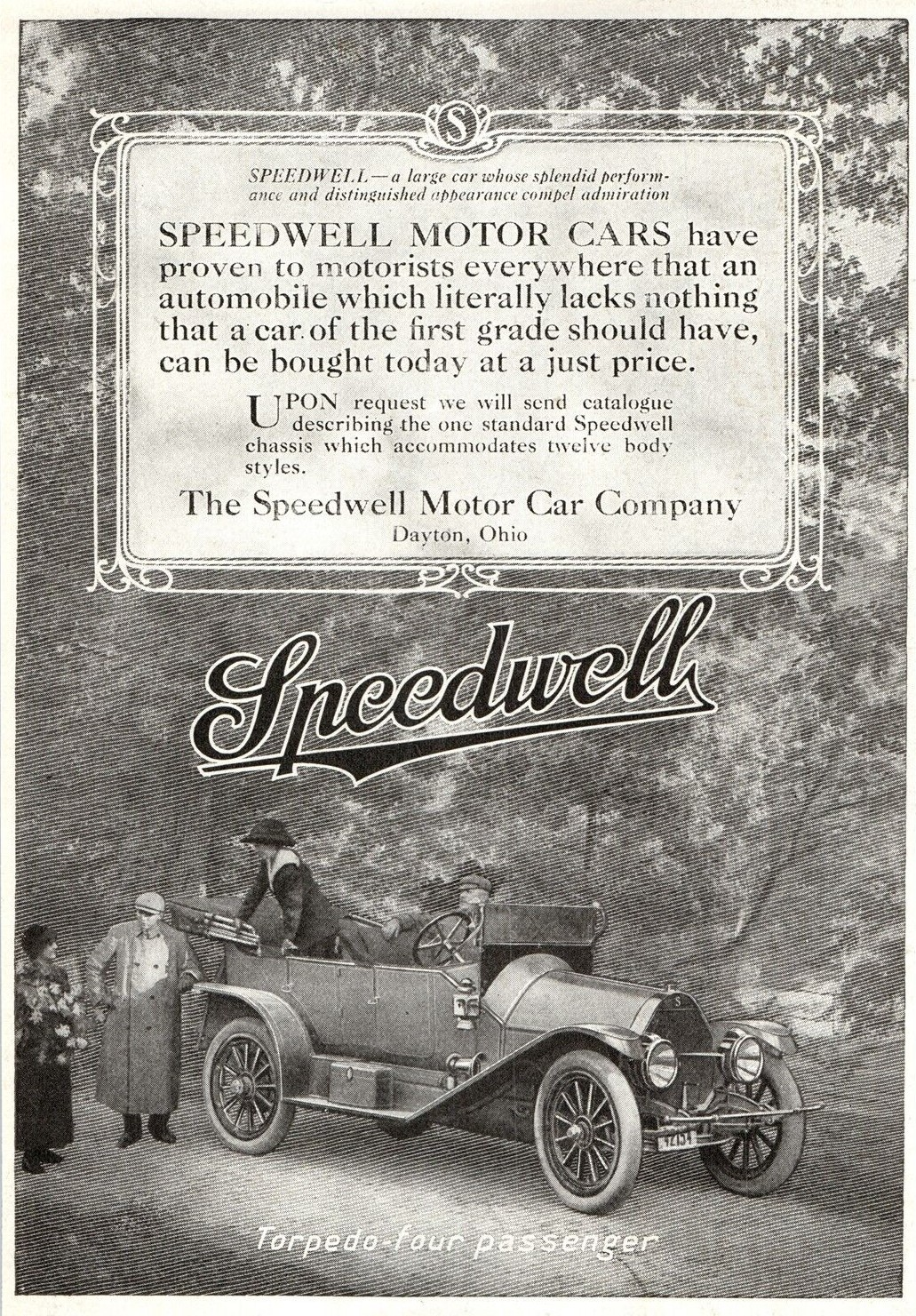
1911 Speedwell Torpedo

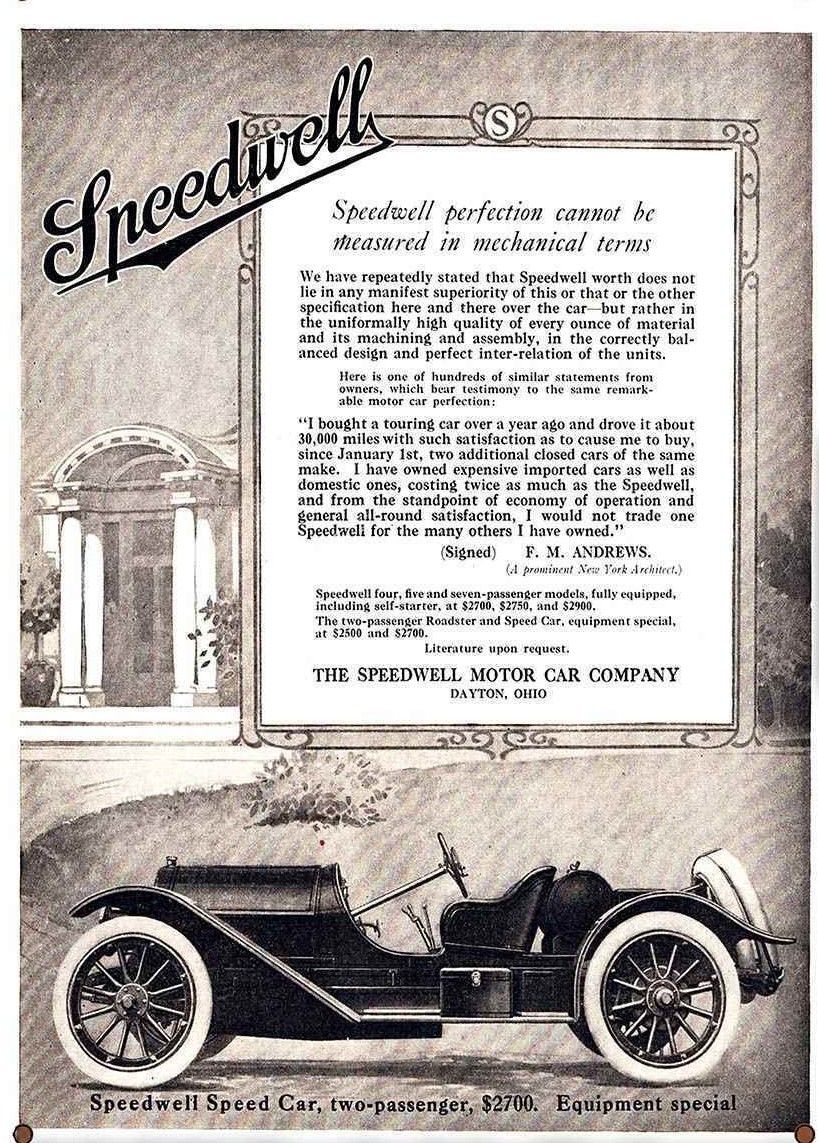
1912 Speedwell Speed Car advertisement

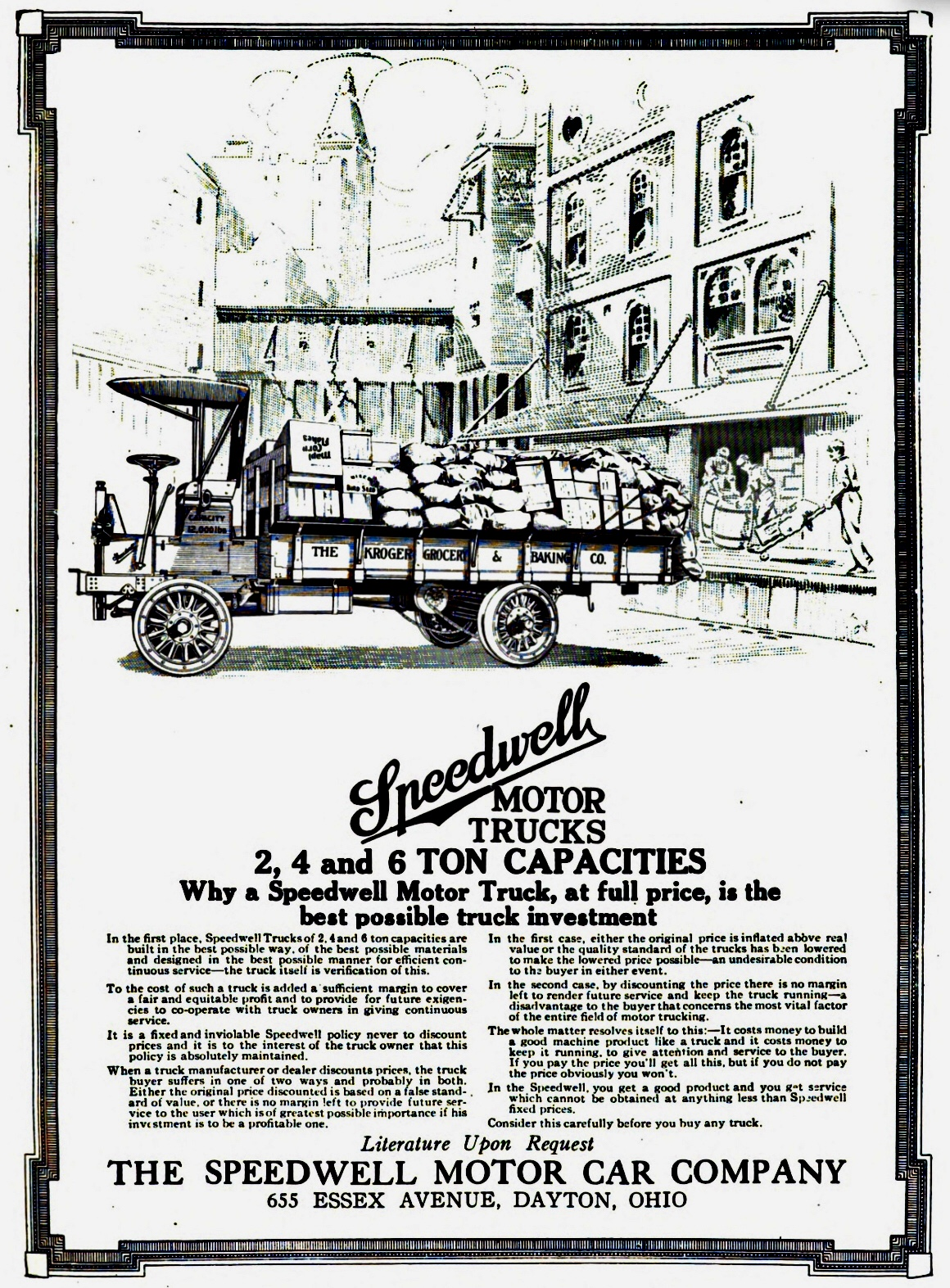
Speedwell advertisement 2t, 4t, 6t Trucks (1912)

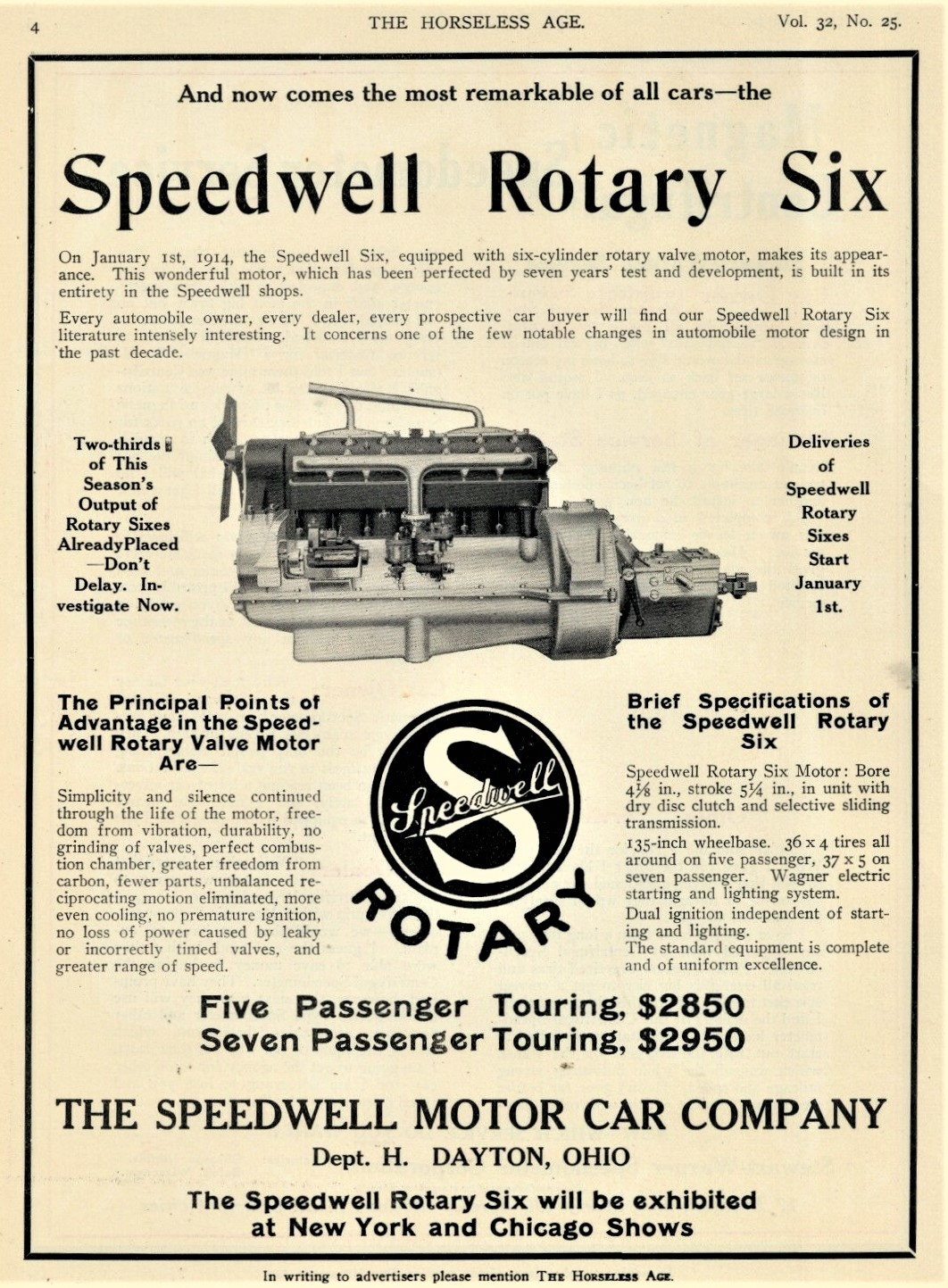
1913 Speedwell Rotary Six advertisement

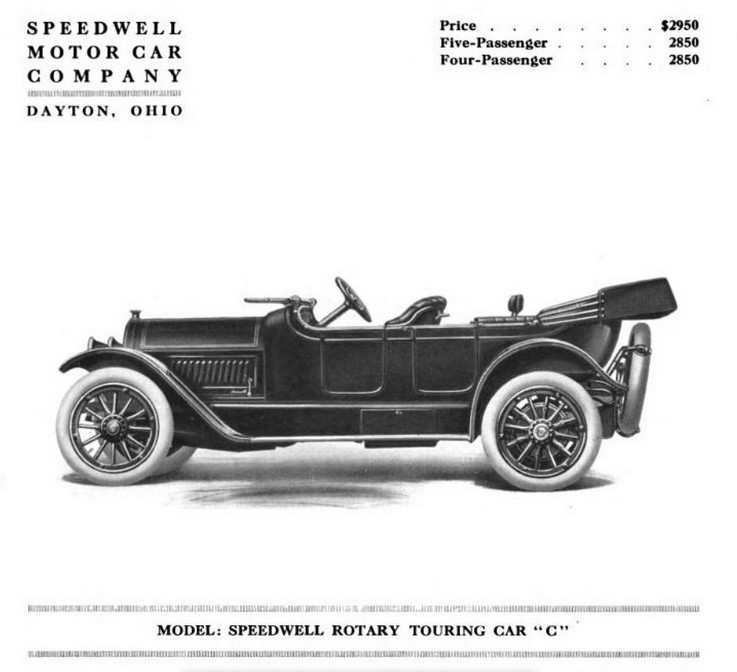
1914 Speedwell Rotary Model C

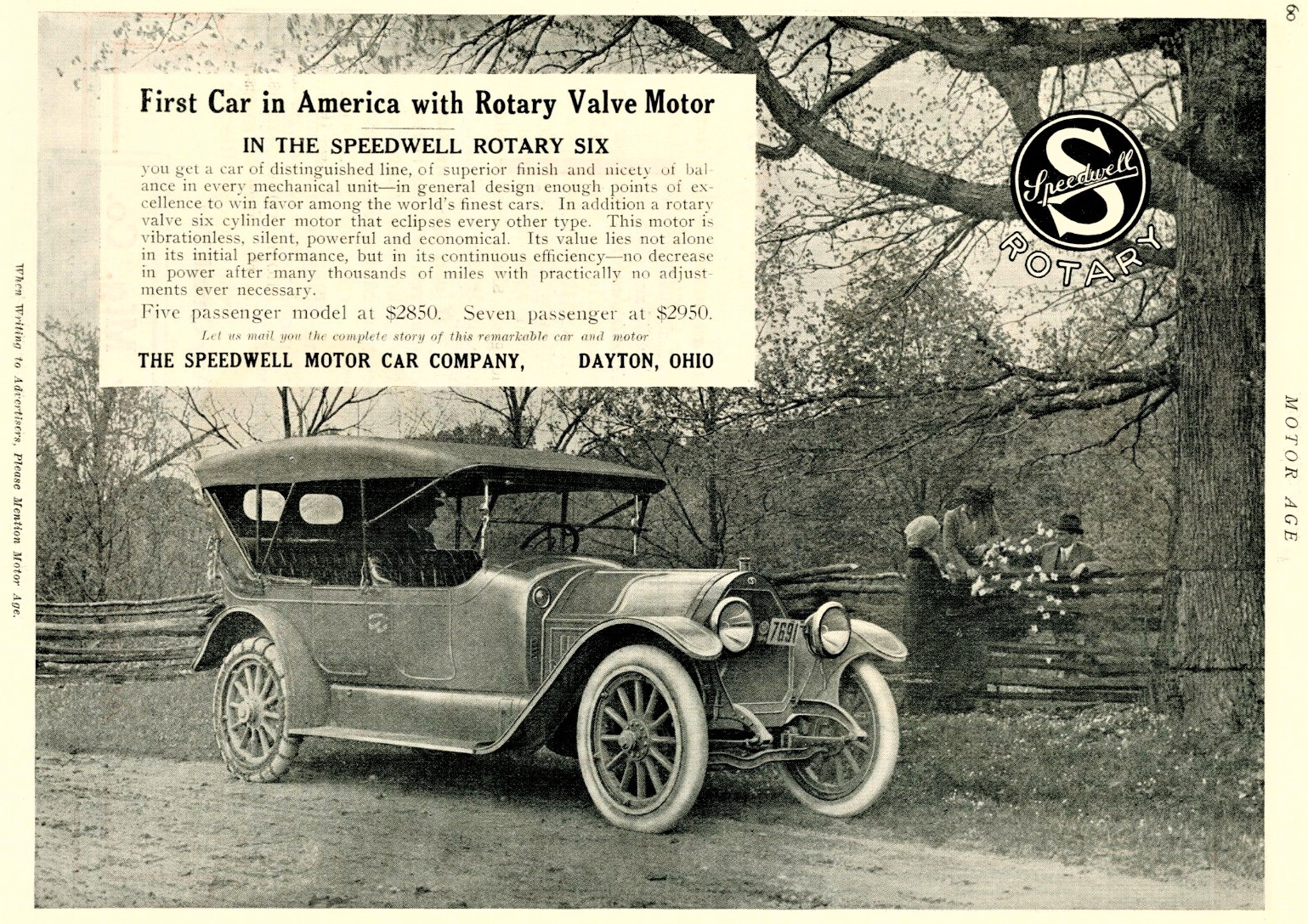
1914 Speedwell Rotary Six

== See also ==
- Apple, an early Dayton automobile manufacturer
- Dayton Electric, an early Dayton automobile manufacturer
- Stoddard-Dayton an early Dayton automobile manufacturer

== Additional reading ==
- Curt Dalton, Roger L. Miller, Michael M. Self, and Ben F. Thompson, Miami Valley's Marvelous Motor Cars: From the Apple-Eight to the Xenia Cyclecar, 1886-1960 (2007).
