= Woodland Cemetery and Arboretum =

Cemetery in Dayton, Ohio

- Woodland Cemetery Gateway, Chapel and Office
- U.S. National Register of Historic Places
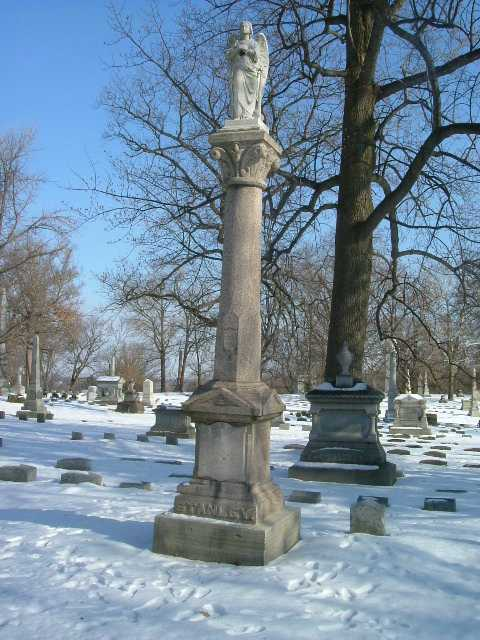
- Stanley family plot in Woodland Cemetery

- Location within Ohio Location within the United States
- Location: Dayton, Ohio
- Coordinates: 39°44′34″N 84°10′45″W
- Built: 1841
- Architect: Burns & Peters, Adolph Strauch
- Architectural style: Romanesque
- NRHP reference No.: 78002147
- Added to NRHP: November 30, 1978

Woodland Cemetery and Arboretum (200 acres), located at 118 Woodland Avenue, Dayton, Ohio, is one of the oldest garden cemeteries in the United States.

Woodland was incorporated in 1842 by John Whitten Van Cleve, the first male child born in Dayton. He was the son of Benjamin Van Cleve and Mary Whitten Van Cleve. The cemetery began with 40 acres (160,000 m^{2}) southeast of Dayton and has been enlarged to its present size of 200 acres (0.81 km^{2}). Over 3,000 trees and 165 specimens of native Midwestern trees and woody plants grace the rolling hills. Many of the trees are more than a century old and 9 have been designated "Ohio Champions". The highest point in Dayton is within the cemetery, and during the Great Dayton Flood of 1913, it became a place of refuge.

The Romanesque gateway, chapel and office, completed in 1889, are on the National Register of Historic Places. The buildings were constructed of the stone from the original cemetery wall. The chapel has one of the finest original Tiffany windows in the country. A mausoleum, with a rock and bronze exterior, features twenty-two varieties of imported marble and twelve large stained glass windows inspired by famous literary works. It was added in 1970. The oldest original 105-acre section of the cemetery, known as "Victorian", received a second designation as a historic district on the National Register of Historic Places in 2011.

A receiving vault large enough to contain 12 crypts was built in 1847 by Joseph Wuichert, who was said to be Dayton's premier stonemason. Throughout the 19th century it was used for temporary storage when burials were delayed due to bad weather or for other reasons (for example, refer to the article below on Levi and Matilda Stanley). Located near the main entrance to the cemetery and across from the mausoleum, it is constructed of giant limestone slabs and was designed as a replica of the Egyptian-style temple of Thebes and Karnak. It was unused for nearly 100 years but the exterior was restored in 2008 to its original condition.

== Notable burials ==
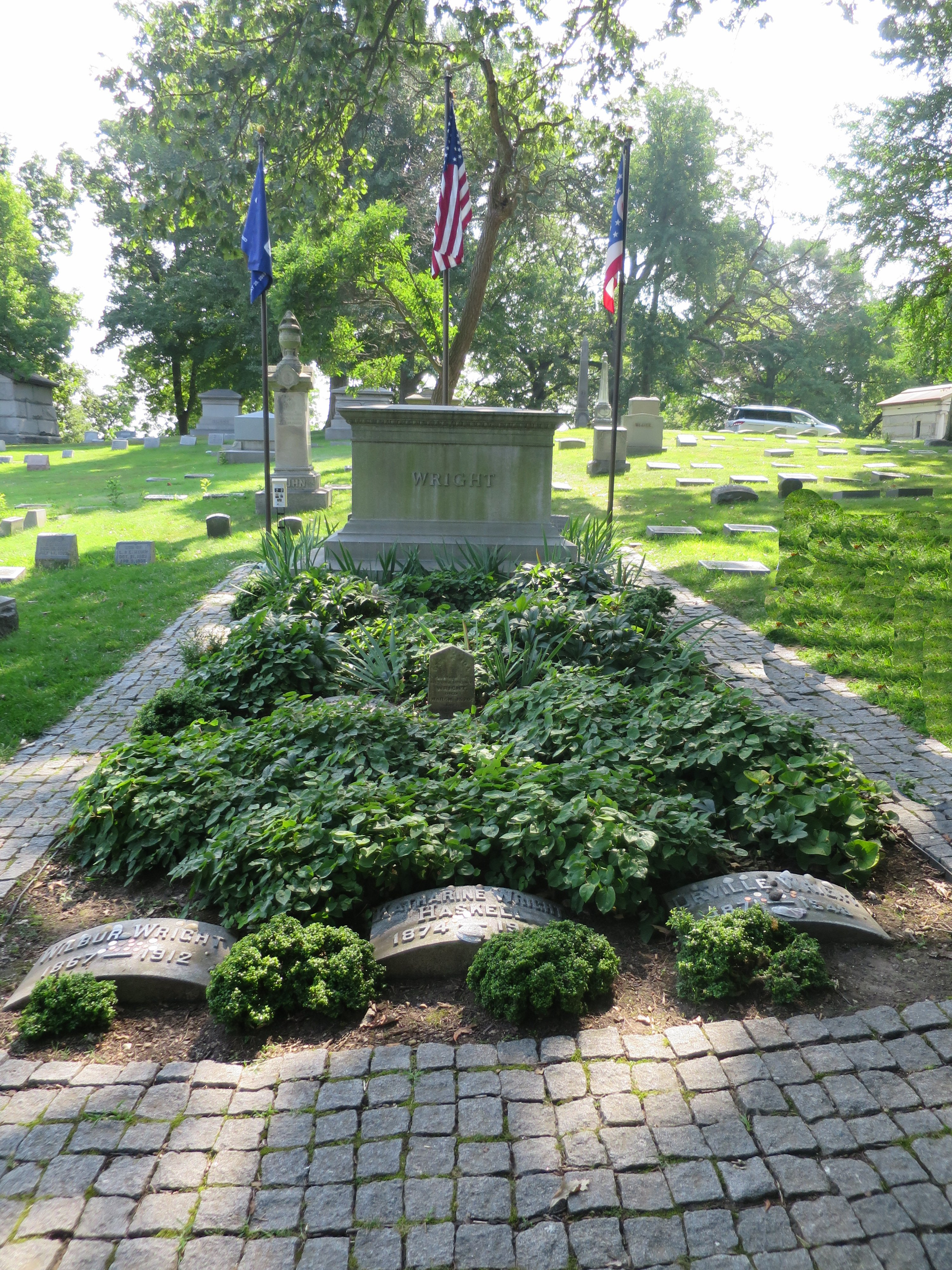
The Wright Brothers plot

The monuments, ranging from rugged boulders to Greek statues and temples, memorialize the lives of people who helped shape the nation and the city. Woodland is the final resting place for more than 100,000 people, including:

- Orville and Wilbur Wright, inventors of the airplane
- Lieutenant Colonel Charity Adams Earley, Commanding Officer of the 6888th Central Postal Directory Battalion
- Jordan Anderson, freed slave and letter writer
- John H. Balsley, inventor of the folding step-ladder
- Alice Pike Barney, artist
- Loren M. Berry, inventor of the Yellow Pages
- Eva Best, story writer, poet, music composer, dramatist
- Charles Goodwin Bickham, Medal of Honor recipient, Philippine Insurrection
- Erma Bombeck, humorist and writer
- Alex Campbell, professional golfer of early 20th century
- Mrs. Leslie Carter, actress
- William Charch, DuPont Chemist, inventor of moistureproof cellophane for food packaging.
- Charlotte Reeve Conover, historian
- Daniel C. Cooper, surveyor and Proprietor of Dayton
- James M. Cox, newspaper publisher, Governor of Ohio and Presidential candidate
- Edward A. Deeds, engineer, inventor and industrialist
- Paul Laurence Dunbar, poet, novelist, and short story writer of the late 19th and early 20th centuries
- John Glossinger, popularized the Oh Henry! candy bar
- Charles Herby, architect
- Marj Heyduck, Dayton Daily News columnist and editor
- George P. Huffman, industrialist (Huffy Bicycles)
- Andrew Iddings, inventor of the stereoptic (3-D) camera.
- Charles F. Kettering, inventor, engineer, businessman, holder of 186 patents, founder of Delco, head of research at General Motors from 1920 to 1947, invented the automobile electric starter among other important inventions.
- Earl Kiser, bicyclist and auto racer, "Little Dayton Demon"
- Elsie May Kittredge, botanist
- L. L. Langstroth, father of American beekeeping
- Leroy Tate Marshall, US representative
- George Mead, industrialist (Mead Paper)
- James Albert Parsons, Jr., metallurgist, inventor, educator; invented stainless steel, corrosion-resistant materials
- John H. Patterson, industrialist (NCR)
- James Ritty, inventor of the cash register
- James Findlay Schenck, Rear Admiral, United States Navy
- Pierce Schenck, metalworking business executive
- Robert Cumming Schenck, Civil War General, member of US Congress and Ambassador to Brazil and United Kingdom
- David A. Sinclair (1874–1902), Scottish immigrant and secretary of the Dayton YMCA, established a YMCA training school in 1888 and is the namesake of Sinclair Community College
- Jacob William Sortman, well respected Dayton builder and brickmason of the late 1800’s, was a member of the 66th Illinois Infantry Regiment, also known as the Western Sharpshooters, in the Civil War (1861-1864) and fought in 31 battles and skirmishes,
- Levi and Matilda Stanley, "King and Queen" of the Gypsies
- John W. Stoddard built the Stoddard-Dayton automobile
- Gertrude Strohm, author, compiler, game designer
- Stephen W. Thompson, World War I aviator
- Clement Vallandigham Congressman and Copperhead leader
- David Ziegler, first mayor of Cincinnati, Ohio
- Milton Wright, father of aviation pioneers Wilbur Wright and Orville Wright, and a bishop of the Church of the United Brethren in Christ.

== See also ==
- List of cemeteries in the United States
- List of botanical gardens and arboretums in the United States
- National Register of Historic Places listings in Dayton, Ohio
