= Pierce Schenck =

American businessman (1878–1930)

- Born: Pierce Davies Schenck; April 1878; Dayton, Ohio, U.S.
- Died: October 15, 1930 (aged 52); Dayton, Ohio, U.S.
- Resting place: Woodland Cemetery
- Education: Yale University
- Occupation: Businessman
- Spouse(s): Caroline Lowe Stoddard (m. 1904; div. 1927) Rosamund Fuller Christian (m. 1928)
- Children: 2
- Relatives: Samuel W. Davies (grandfather); Robert C. Schenck (great uncle); James F. Schenck (great uncle)

Pierce Davies Schenck (April 1878 – October 15, 1930) was an entrepreneur in the metalworking business in Dayton, Ohio.

== Early life ==
Pierce (or Peirce) Davies Schenck was born on April 20 (or 23), 1878, in Dayton, Ohio, to Julia Crane (née Davies) and Robert Cumming Schenck. His maternal grandfather was Samuel W. Davies. His paternal side was descended from Frederik V Schenck van Toutenburg of Holland and William Cortenus Schenck. His great uncles were Robert C. Schenck and James F. Schenck. He was educated at Phillips Academy in Andover, Massachusetts. He then attended Sheffield Scientific School at Yale University and graduated in 1900.

== Career ==
Following graduation, Schenck worked at the City Railway Company in Dayton on street railway. He then worked for People's Railway Company. After three years, he became secretary of Malleable Iron Works, the company his father was president of. He became interested in automobiles. He then succeeded W. B. Earnshaw on January 15, 1907, as president of the Malleable Iron Works following his death.

Schenck built an automobile at his house and following this success, he decided to found Speedwell Motor Car Company in 1907. The business was successful and produced several thousand cars daily but competition forced the business to shutter in 1915. He remained president of Malleable Iron Works throughout his Speedwell venture, but resigned the post on June 12, 1915, and was succeeded as president by John C. Haswell. In 1915 to organize, incorporate and serve president of Duriron Castings Company (later Duriron Company). The term "Duriron" was coined by Schenck to describe adapting high silicon iron for practical purposes. He experimented and invented an acid-proof process for castings in a small building behind his home on Oakwood Avenue in Dayton. The company used this acid-proof technique to manufacture castings and other apparatuses. He started the business at the old Globe Iron Works on South Ludlow and Bayard streets with two people and it was later relocated to North Findlay street. By World War I, the company employed about 1,500 men. Speedwell purchased and occupied a former Dayton Machine Tool Company factory on Essex Avenue in Dayton's Edgemont neighborhood, a site that later hosted a Delco factory. The factory provided temporary space to the Wright Company in 1910 before the completion of its new airplane factory in west Dayton. The Great Dayton Flood of 1913 inundated the Speedwell factory, destroying machinery and automobiles, and the company proved unable to recover and entered receivership in 1915.

During World War I, Schenck was appointed by the United States Army Corps to inspect goods for the government. He managed government inspection of war materials at an office building that later became the Miami Savings Building. He resigned the post. He was president of the Dayton Asphalt and Roofing Company and trustee of Woodland Cemetery. He was a member of the Yale Club of New York, the Chemist Club of New York, the Berzellus Society and the Engineers Club of Dayton.

== Personal life ==
Schenck married Caroline Lowe Stoddard, daughter of E. Fowler Stoddard, of Dayton on August 16, 1904. They had two sons, Robert C. and Peirce Davies Jr. Schenck later divorced his wife Caroline in 1927. He married Rosamund Fuller Christian of New York City on January 28, 1928. He had a home at 414 Oakwood Avenue in Oakwood that was designed by Dayton architect Albert Pretzinger in 1927.

Schenck fell ill in January 1930. He spent time in Miami Valley Hospital and went to a sanitarium in Cincinnati. He died on October 15, 1930, at his home on Madriver Road in Dayton. He was buried in Woodland Cemetery.
