= Charlotte Reeve Conover =

American journalist (1855–1940)

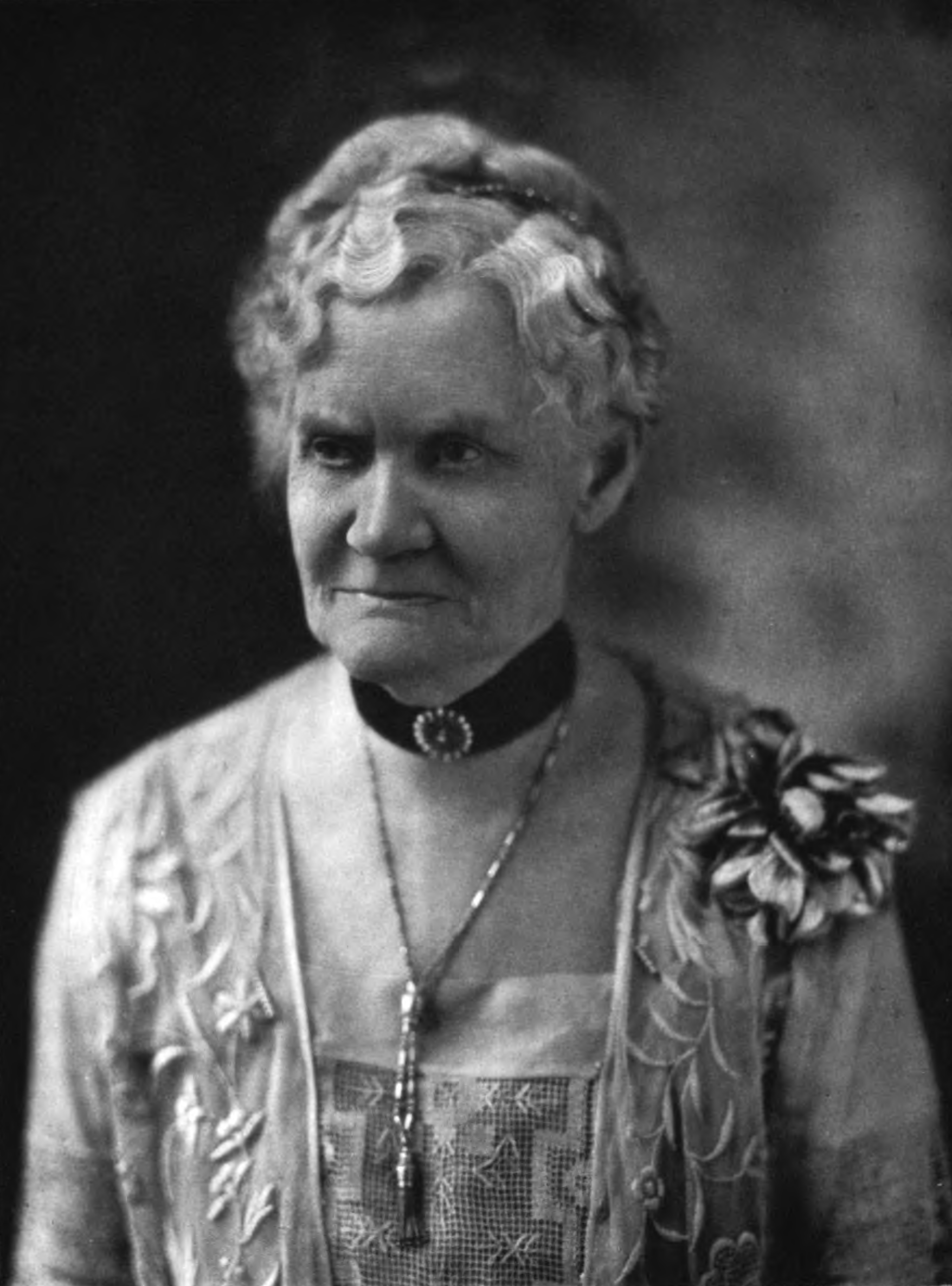
- Born: Charlotte Reeve; June 14, 1855; Dayton, Ohio
- Died: September 23, 1940 (aged 85)
- Resting place: Woodland Cemetery and Arboretum
- Writing career
- Genre: History

Charlotte Reeve Conover (June 14, 1855 – September 23, 1940) was an American author, lecturer, political activist, educator, and "Dayton's historian".

== Early life and education ==
Conover was born to physician Dr. John Charles and Emma Barlow Reeve on June 14, 1855. She attended Dayton Central High School, Cooper Seminary, and the University of Geneva.

== Writing career ==
Conover wrote books about Dayton history and articles for Ladies' Home Journal, Harper's and The Atlantic. She wrote a regular column called "Mrs. Conover's Corner" for the Dayton Daily News and served as editor of the Women's Page for four years. Her four-volume history Dayton and Montgomery County was in 1965 considered "the most authentic public record of Dayton and its pioneer citizens." She was noted for her "pioneering studies" of area history.

In her later years she lost her eyesight but continued to write columns for the Dayton Daily News; friends visited to help her read, and the paper's owner and editor, Governor Cox, never knew that she was blind.

== Impact ==
In 1901, Conover martialled the Young Women's League of Dayton to take over the publication of the Dayton Daily News – known as "The Day The Women Got Out The News" – on March 30, 1901, as a fundraiser for the organization. Conover was a leader of the Woman's Suffrage Party of Montgomery County. In The Importance for Women to have Suffrage: An Address before the Woman Suffrage Association she spoke of the importance of suffrage and equality of the sexes to the country's future. Conover was a founder of the Dayton Woman's Literary Club and served as its fourth president, from 1895 to 1897. She encouraged other writers, among them fellow Daytonian Paul Laurence Dunbar.

In 1932, one of her lectures, Ramblings of an Ancient Daytonian, was reprinted in its entirety in the Dayton Daily News.

The Dayton Daily News in 1940 called her "Dayton's foremost historian." This obituary appeared on the front pages of the Dayton Daily News and the Dayton Herald, and on the editorial page of the Dayton Journal. NCR chairman of the board E. A. Deeds called her "perhaps Dayton's most outstanding citizen."

== Personal life ==
Conover married lawyer Frank K. Conover on October 14, 1879. They had four children, Elizabeth Dickson, John Charles Reeve, Wilbur Dickson, and Charlotte Mary.

== Awards and honors ==
Conover was inducted into the Dayton Walk of Fame in 2007. Paul Laurence Dunbar dedicated his Lyrics of Sunshine and Shadow to her. She is listed in Woman's Who's Who of America 1914–1915.

== Bibliography ==
- Some Dayton Saints and Prophets
- Concerning the Forefathers: Being A Memoir, with personal narrative and letters of two pioneers Col. Robert Patterson and Col. John Johnston (1903)
- Recollections of Sixty Years By John Johnston, Indian Agent for the US Government (1915, with John Johnston)
- Memoirs of the Miami Valley (1919)
- Dayton: An Intimate History
- Dayton and Montgomery County (1932)
- Builders in New Fields (1939)
- David Gebhart, Alpha 1827 - Omega 1907: A Memory and an Appreciation
- On Being Eighty and Other Digressions
- A History of the Beck Family
- The Patterson Log Cabin
- The Story of Dayton
- Harvest of Years: Four sprightly essays
