= Apple (1910s automobile) =

Defunct American motor vehicle manufacturer

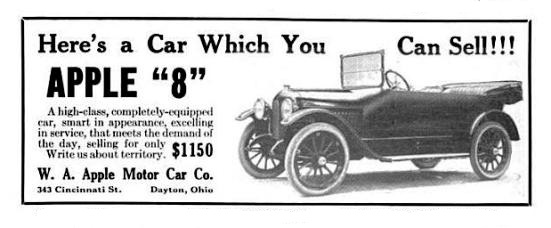
1916 Apple Touring Car

The Apple Eight was a short-lived American automobile manufactured by the Apple Motor Car Company in Dayton, Ohio, from 1915 to 1917. The Apple 8 model cost $1,150 and had 44 horsepower (33 kW). An inline eight-cylinder engine and three-speed transmission were in a unit. Well-tested standard vendor parts were used. The body had a 118 inches (300 cm) wheelbase and could seat five. It was advertised as a luxury car and used the slogan "No hills too steep. No roads too rough".

William A. Apple formed W. A. Apple Auto Top Company in 1912 to make tops for the Ford Model T. In 1915 he changed the name to W. A. Apple Motor Car Co. and began assembling the Eight in May. By September he had assembled 40. A fire on October 11, 1915, completely destroyed the factory. After suing his insurance company, in 1917 William A. was awarded $28,014.31. He returned to car tops and upholstery. A successor business, W. A. Apple Textile Manufacturer, built parachutes during World War II.

== See also ==
- List of defunct United States automobile manufacturers
- Dayton Electric, an early Dayton area automobile manufacturer
- Speedwell Motor Car Company, an early Dayton area automobile manufacturer
