= Duriron Company =

American industrial component manufacturer

- Formerly: Duriron Casting Company
- Industry: Manufacturing
- Founded: 1912; 114 years ago in Dayton, Ohio, United States
- Founders: John R. Pitman, William E. Hall, Pierce D. Schenck
- Defunct: July 1997
- Fate: Merged with BW/IP
- Successor: Flowserve Corporation
- Revenue: $605 million (1996)

The Duriron Company is an industrial component manufacturer of such products as automatic control valves, valves and actuators, pumps, sealing systems, filtration equipment, pipes and fittings. The company was incorporated in 1912 as the Duriron Casting Company in Dayton, Ohio by John R. Pitman, William E. Hall, and Pierce D. Schenck.

== History ==
The company derives its name from a high silicon cast iron alloy, Duriron, which rapidly became an industry standard for handling extremely corrosive materials. Duriron “denitrating towers” were in high demand during the First World War for safe handling of hot mixtures of nitric and sulfuric acids during the manufacturing of explosives. As a result of the war the company expanded tenfold, increasing its work force from 150 to 1500.

During the 1920s and 30s, Duriron faced a major readjustment period since “denitrating towers” used in the war effort were no longer in demand. The readjustment included the development of a line of more “off the shelf” Duriron pumps and valves for use in the broad chemical process industries. The breadth of alloys in which pumps and valves were offered was also greatly expanded to include a variety of nickel-based alloys, one of which, Durimet-20 (a joint development and patent of Ohio State and Duriron), was to become a world standard for handling certain difficult chemicals. The redirection of the company would begin to reap great returns in the 1940s as Duriron's products became more widely accepted. During World War II, two thirds of Duriron's production was devoted to providing pumps and valves for production of plutonium and uranium for the Manhattan Project which developed the atomic bomb. The company won the prestigious Army/Navy “E” award for these efforts. Duriron became a publicly traded company in 1946.

Subsequent to World War II, Duriron grew consistently in the 1950s, 60s, and 70s, through product innovation and technical sales force expansion to serve the fast growing chemical process industries throughout the U.S., Canada and, in the later of those years, in Europe as well. New products included the first use of Teflon as a sealing substance in a patented special alloy non-lubricated plug valve that quickly acquired a dominant position in the chemical valve business. A new heavy duty chemical pump with a patented reverse vane impeller did the same in the chemical pump business. The first all-Teflon-lined valve and pump were also successfully introduced. As a result, revenues grew from $5 million in 1950 to $125 million in 1979.

In spite of a decline in revenues in the first years of the 1980s, the company grew from $125 million in 1970 to $605 million in 1996, largely through a number of strategic acquisitions that expanded the line of complementary products available for sale to the chemical process industries. The larger of these acquisitions included Valtek in Springville, Utah, a provider of flow control valves for heavy duty services, and Durametallic Corporation in Kalamazoo, Michigan, which offers mechanical seals for pumps and other rotating equipment.

In 1994, Durion announced its acquisition of the Durametallic Corporation (which was incorporated in 1917 as the New Era Manufacturing Company) but it wasn't until 1996 when the acquisition was complete.

By 1997 the company employed a total of 6,000 people in locations throughout the world and was a worldwide leader in engineered valves, pumps, control valves, and mechanical seals for the broad chemical process industries.

In May 1997, Durco International acquired BW/IP International.

The 85-year-old Duriron Corporation lost its name and identity as a Dayton company in July 1997 when Flowserve Corporation was formed by the merger of the $605 million revenue Duriron and the $540 million revenue BW/IP of Long Beach, California, a producer of pumps and mechanical seals for the petroleum, power, and water industries. The new corporation headquarters is in Dallas, Texas and [as of] mid-2002 a $2.5 billion revenue company. This meant the only remaining Dayton activities include the Findlay Street foundry (which was the original operation in 1912), a plastics operation in Springboro, and the worldwide pump engineering staff headquarters office on Monument Avenue. The Duriron Foundry ceased operations May 5, 2016.
