= Flowserve =

Multinational Industrial Supply Company

Flowserve Corporation
- Type: Public
- Traded as: NYSE: FLS; S&P 400 component
- Industry: Diversified machinery
- Founded: 1997
- Headquarters: Irving, Texas, U.S.
- Key people: Rowe, R. Scott, President and CEO (from April 1, 2017); Amy Schwetz, Senior Vice President and Chief Financial Officer; Susan Hudson, Senior Vice President and Chief Legal Officer
- Products: Actuators; Ball valves Butterfly valves Control valves Plug valves end face mechanical seals Pumps
- Services: Power industry Oil industry Gas industry Chemical industry
- Revenue: ▲US$3.945 billion (2019); ▲US$3.833 billion (2018)
- Operating income: ▲US$760.28 million (2013); ▲US$675.78 million (2012)
- Net income: ▲US$485.53 million (2013); ▲US$448.34 million (2012)
- Total assets: ▲US$7.8 billion (2015); ▲US$ 4.8 billion (2012)
- Total equity: ▼US$1.88 billion (2013); ▼US$1.89 billion (2012)
- Number of employees: 17,000 (2017)
- Website: flowserve.com

The Flowserve Corporation is an American multinational corporation and one of the largest suppliers of industrial and environmental machinery such as pumps, valves, end face mechanical seals, automation, and services to the power, oil, gas, chemical and other industries. Headquartered in Irving, Texas, which is in the Dallas–Fort Worth Metroplex, Flowserve employs close to 16,000 employees in more than 50 countries. Flowserve sells products and offers aftermarket services to engineering and construction firms, original equipment manufacturers, distributors, and end users. The Flowserve brand name originated in 1997 with a merger of BW/IP (Borg-Warner/IP International) and Durco International.

== History ==
Flowserve's heritage dates back to the 1790 founding of Simpson & Thompson by Thomas Simpson, later to become Worthington Simpson Pumps, one of the companies that became part of BW/IP. The company was created in 1997 with the merger of two fluid motion and control companies: BW/IP and Durco International.

Acquisitions include HydroTechnik Olomouc in 2006, Sealing Systems in 2007, Calder AG in 2009, and Valbart Srl in 2010. In October 2011, Flowserve acquired Lawrence Pumps Inc. In March 2013, it acquired a manufacturing plant from L&T Valves situated in Maraimalainagar, Tamil Nadu. In 2015 Flowserve acquired SIHI.

=== Products ===
Flowserve comprises over 48 fluid motion and control products. They are in alphabetical order:

ACEC Centrifugal, Accord, Aldrich, Anchor Darling, Argus, Atomac, Automax, BW Seals, Byron Jackson, Cameron, Calder, DuraClear, Durametallic, Durco, Edward, Five Star Seals, Flowserve, IDP, Innomag, Interseal, Jeumont-Schneider, Kammer, Limitorque, Logix, McCANNA/MARPAC, NAF, NAVAL, Noble Alloy, Norbro, Nordstrom, PMV, Pac-Seal, Pacific, Pacific Wietz, Pleuger, Polyvalve, Schmidt Armaturen, Scienco, Serck Audco, Sier-Bath Rotary, SIHI (Siemen & Hinsch), TKL, United Centrifugal, Valtek, Valtek EMA, Vogt, Western Land Roller, Wilson-Snyder, Worcester Controls, Worthington

=== Acquisitions ===
Flowserve has grown through mergers and acquisitions.

==== Acquisitions under Flowserve Corporation ====
- 1997 - Merger of BW/IP and Durco International (adoption of brand name Flowserve)
- 1997 - Stork Engineered Pumps
- 2000 - Ingersoll-Dresser Pumps (IDP)
- 2000 - Innovative Valve Technologies Inc. (Houston-based maintenance, repair, and replacement services for industrial valves, piping systems, and process system components)
- 2002 - Flow Control division of Invensys (manufacturer of valves, actuators and associated flow control products)
- 2004 - Thompsons Kelly & Lewis (Australian supplier of centrifugal pumps)
- 2005 - Interseal assets (from Australia-based Ludowici Mineral Processing Equipment Pty Ltd.)
- 2006 - HydroTechnik (privately held mechanical seal manufacturer based in Olomouc, Czech Republic)
- 2007 - MF Sealing Systems (British industrial pump and seal repairer)
- 2009 - Calder AG (Swiss desalination energy-recovery system provider)
- 2010 - Valbart Srl (privately owned Italian valve manufacturer)
- 2011 - Lawrence Pumps Inc. (privately held centrifugal pumps manufacturer)
- 2013 - Audco India Limited (MMN PLANT)
- 2013 - Innomag Sealless Pumps
- 2015 - Sihi Group
- 2024 - MOGAS (specialized valve manufacturer)

== Industries served ==
- Oil and gas: production, refining, pipeline, gas processing
- Power generation: nuclear power, combine cycle, conventional boiler, renewable water energy
- Chemical processing: acid transfer, caustic and chlor-alkali, pharmaceuticals, polymers, slurry processing, solvents, volatile organic compounds, waste processing, auxiliary
- Water resources: water supply and distribution, water treatment, desalination, flood control, ground water development and irrigation, wastewater collection and treatment, snowmaking
- General industry: mining, primary metals, pulp and paper

== Educational services ==
Over the years, Flowserve has extended their training centers in every region of the global market with main training centers in each region: Irving, Texas for North America, Etten-Leur, The Netherlands for Europe-Middle East-Africa, Rio de Janeiro, Brazil for Latin America, and Singapore for Asia Pacific. These main training locations are all equipped with classrooms, static power labs with complete pumping systems, and specialized practical training material. Besides the regular training offers, Educational Services offers customer specific training development supported by their own global development team. Besides these main training locations, each region also has multiple satellite training locations to serve students from around the world. There are currently 25 training locations worldwide consisting of 26 employees.

== Environmental efforts ==
To support the Hurricane Katrina disaster relief, Flowserve donated $50,000 and matched up to $50,000 in employee donations to the Red Cross.

== See also ==
- List of oilfield service companies
