= James Simpson (engineer) =

British civil engineer

- James Simpson
- Born: 1799
- Died: 1869 (aged 69–70)
- Engineering career
- Discipline: civil engineer
- Institutions: Institution of Civil Engineers (president) Fellow of the Royal Society

James Simpson FRS FRSA (1799–1869) was a British civil engineer. He was president of the Institution of Civil Engineers from January 1853 to January 1855.

James Simpson was the fourth son of Thomas Simpson, engineer of the Chelsea Waterworks. James succeeded his father in both this post and that of engineer of the Lambeth Waterworks Company. It was under Simpson's instruction that the Chelsea Waterworks became the first in the country to install a slow sand filtration system to purify the water they were drawing from the River Thames. This filter consisted of successive beds of loose brick, gravel and sand to remove solids from the water.

He also designed waterworks at Windsor Castle and Bristol as well as The Wooden Pier at Southend-on-Sea.

Simpson established J. Simpson & Co., a manufacturer of steam engines and pumps, making several improvements to their design.

Professional and academic associations
| Preceded by James Meadows Rendel | President of the Institution of Civil Engineers; December 1853 – December 1855 | Succeeded by Robert Stephenson |
