= Loren M. Berry =

American businessman

- Born: Loren Murphy Berry; July 24, 1888; Wabash, Indiana, U.S.
- Died: February 10, 1980 (aged 91); Oakwood, Montgomery County, Ohio, U.S.
- Resting place: Woodland Cemetery and Arboretum, Dayton, Ohio, U.S.
- Occupations: Businessman; advertising executive
- Known for: Pioneering the yellow pages business telephone directory industry
- Spouse(s): Lucille (died 1935); Helen (died 1974)
- Children: 2
- Parent(s): Charles D. Berry; Elizabeth Murphy

Loren Murphy Berry (July 24, 1888 – February 10, 1980) was born in Wabash, Indiana, the son of Charles D. and Elizebeth (Murphy) Berry. He was a pioneer in the yellow pages business telephone directory industry.

== Early life ==
His father died when Loren was four years old. His mother worked as a maternity nurse and seamstress, among other jobs, to support herself and Loren. At age eight, Berry prepared and sold horseradish, and had newspaper and laundry routes. In high school, he was a reporter for the Wabash Plain Dealer and was sports editor and business manager for his school's monthly publication. As business manager, he gained experience selling advertising space. While selling advertising for timetables that served interurban railroads, Berry was asked by the manager of a telephone company to sell advertising space in the company's directory.

In 1910, Loren and his wife Lucille moved to Dayton, Ohio, and, on a shoestring budget, began The Ohio Guide Company, printing timetables. He recognized the opportunities for Yellow Pages and soon concentrated on a telephone directory operation that, as L. M. Berry and Company, developed into a coast-to-coast enterprise and became one of the foremost telephone directory publishers in the United States, handling one out of every four telephone directories in the United States.

His wife Lucille died in 1935 and Loren married Helen, who lived until 1974.

== Mr Yellow Pages ==
Loren Berry became known as "Mr. Yellow Pages." His motto was "It CAN be done!" He expanded his operations to Europe, where the product is called the Golden Pages. The company sold advertising space and handled production for many of the local Yellow Pages. It was sold to BellSouth Corp. in 1986. Terms were not disclosed, but industry observers estimated the sales price at more than $1 billion. The subsidiary is operated as The Berry Company and is responsible for more than 800 directory titles nationwide, serving more than 100 U.S. telephone companies and one million advertisers.

Berry established the Loren M. Berry Foundation to oversee charitable gifts to arts, education, and medical research. These have included gifts to establish the Loren M. Berry Center for Economic Education and Ohio Stock Market Simulation at the University of Rio Grande and the Loren M. Berry Endowment for the Ray C. Bliss Institute of Applied Politics at the University of Akron, established in 1990 to support speakers and public programs within the Institute.

Loren Berry was a Republican Presidential Elector for Ohio in 1956 and 1972. In 1976, Loren Berry was inducted as a member of the Horatio Alger Association of Distinguished Americans, which honors the achievements of outstanding individuals who have succeeded in spite of adversity. In 1982, he was added to the Telephone Hall of Fame honor roll of the Independent Telecommunications Pioneer Association.

On the occasion of his 90th birthday he said, "I've been fortunate to know many people who have shared with me...a faith in the individual's ability to achieve, a willingness to work hard — very hard, and a strong belief in the free enterprise system."

He died at his home in Oakwood and he and his wives and two children are interred at Woodland Cemetery, Dayton, Ohio.

In 1978, Loren's son John W. Berry endowed the Loren M. Berry Chair in Economics at Dartmouth College to honor his father. John W. Berry was a 1944 graduate of Dartmouth and also donated $27 million for the construction of the Berry Library. The Berry Sports Center, opened in 1987, was also a gift of the Berry family.
