= Thomas Simpson (engineer) =

British civil engineer

- Born: 1755; Blackwell, Carlisle, Cumberland
- Died: 1823 (aged 67–68)
- Engineering career
- Discipline: civil engineer

Thomas Simpson (1755–1823) was a British civil engineer.

== Career ==
Simpson was born in Blackwell, Carlisle and began his career in 1778 as a millwright until being appointed an inspector and engineer of the Chelsea Waterworks. He later also became an engineer at Lambeth Waterworks Company. He contributed to the introduction of iron fresh water pipes and replacement of wooden mains in London and throughout the United Kingdom, testifying before a Parliamentary select committee in 1821 that he had invented a method of making spigot and socket joints watertight by filling them with hemp or flax and then covering them in lead. He also built a workshop to repair and maintain steam engines in 1785, which his son James Simpson took over and developed into James Simpson and Co. Ltd, later Worthington-Simpson Ltd, which after several further mergers currently trades as Flowserve.
