= Worthington-Simpson =

British pump manufacturer

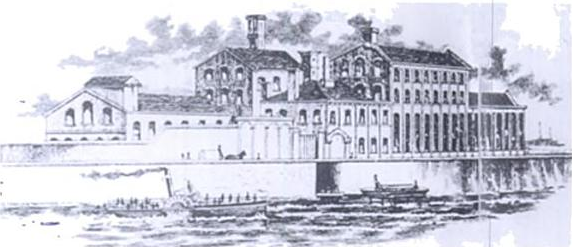
- J. Simpson & Co. factory at 101 Grosvenor Road, Pimlico, 1860
- Industry: Pump manufacturing
- Founded: c. 1785
- Founder: Thomas Simpson
- Defunct: 1969
- Fate: Acquired
- Successor: Studebaker-Worthington
- Headquarters: United Kingdom

Worthington-Simpson was a British pump manufacturer. Many of their pumps were used in municipal waterworks in Great Britain.

The company has its roots in a steam engine workshop founded by Thomas Simpson around 1785. His sons took over the workshop and founded James Simpson & Co., which became Worthington Pump Co. through a merger in 1903, renamed Worthington-Simpson in 1917. It continued as an independent pump manufacturer until 1969, when it became a subsidiary of Studebaker-Worthington. A series of mergers and divestitures followed. The successor company as of 2013, formed through a number of mergers, is Flowserve.

== Origins ==
James Simpson (1799–1869), founder of J. Simpson & Co.

In 1785 Thomas Simpson, an engineer, set up the Lambeth Waterworks. At first a small company, it supplied water to parts of Southwark and Vauxhall from pumping works on the south side of the River Thames. Simpson was engineer to this company for the next forty-one years. He also became engineer of the Chelsea Waterworks Company. Simpson set up a workshop for repairing and maintaining the recently invented steam engines used by his company. The workshop would be taken over by his sons and developed into a large steam engine and pump manufacturing business. In 1799 Simpson was engineer of the Liverpool and Harrington Waterworks Company, which combined with the Bootle Waterworks Company with Thomas Telford as engineer to provide general water supplies to Liverpool. At first the Bootle works had just one 2 hp steam engine forcing the water through wooden tubes.

When Simpson died in 1823 his son James Simpson (1799–1869) succeeded him as Engineer at the Chelsea Waterworks Company and the Lambeth Waterworks Company. These were both part-time jobs, and James Simpson had time to operate an engineering consultancy, one of the first. In 1828 James Simpson built the first slow sand filter bed in London for the Chelsea waterworks. By the 1830s James Simpson was devoting most of his time to his engineering consultancy. He provided designs of waterworks for the cities of Bristol, Copenhagen and Aberdeen. He designed a long pier at Southend and a new west dock at Hartlepool among other works.

== James Simpson and Company ==
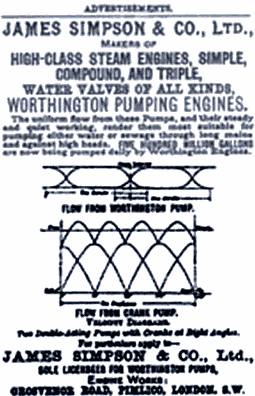
1891 advertisement for James Simpson & Co, pump manufacturers, from Molesworth's Pocket Book of Engineering Formulae

Simpson and Thompson was created in 1825 as a partnership between James Simpson, engineer of the Chelsea Waterworks, and George Thompson, engine maker. The partnership was dissolved in 1836. James Simpson founded James Simpson & Co., a manufacturer of steam engines and pumps, and made several improvements to the design of these machines. In the 1830s his brother William (1809-1864), the sixth son of Thomas Simpson, ran the engine-making factory in Pimlico. By 1839 the company had moved to Belgrave Road.

In 1855 James Simpson & Co. supplied four compound beam engines to power the Stoke Newington pumping station, working alongside two single-cylinder engines from James Watt & Co. The exterior disguised the station as a "Scottish Baronial" castle. In 1857 James Simpson, Junior, joined the company, which made pumping equipment, particularly Woolf Compound pumping engines, and constructed water works. James Simpson & Co. were installed in a new Thames-side factory in Pimlico by 1860. Some of their output in the years that followed included a steam locomotive for the Southampton Dock Company (1866), two rotative beam engines for Tunbridge Wells Waterworks (1866), two beam pumping engines for the Berlin Waterworks (1870) and a vertical rotative engine for Weston-super-Mare Waterworks (1871).

James Simpson and Co was registered in 1885. That year the Worthington Pumping Engine Company, representatives of Worthington pumps of the United States, obtained an order from the British Army to deliver ten high-pressure pumps to deliver water needed by the British Expeditionary army coming to the aid of General Gordon in Khartoum, Sudan. The British pump suppliers did not have the capacity to deliver the pumps fast enough. James Simpson & Co. learned of the Worthington company because of this order, and on 13 December 1885 signed an agreement with the Worthington Pumping Engine Company under which they gained exclusive manufacturing rights for Worthington pumps in Britain. The pumps would be sold in the English and Colonial markets.

The company delivered a Worthington pumping engine for Bournemouth Waterworks in 1889, and a Direct-Acting Pump for the Hammersmith Station of London's Metropolitan Water Board in 1890. An 1891 report on a pump recently installed in Oxford said Worthington pumping engines were almost entirely replacing beam engines and other types of fly-wheel engine. The engines were more powerful and consumed less coal for the same amount of work. James Simpson and Co were the sole licensees for this type of engine.

On 11 July 1892 James Simpson and Co became incorporated as a public company. In 1895 James Simpson and Co were described as crane, pump, iron girder and iron tank manufacturers, hot water apparatus makers, ironfounders, with headquarters at 101 Grosvenor Rd, London SW. In 1899 James Simpson and Co built new and larger works at Balderton, near Newark-on-Trent, Nottinghamshire.

== Worthington Pump Co. ==
1903 the London-based Simpson and Worthington companies merged to become the Worthington Pump Co. (Note: The 1903 merger applied to the London-based Worthington Pumping Engine Company. The American parent remained independent.) In 1906 James Simpson and Co. Ltd of London signed a contract with York Waterworks to manufacture and supply a Worthington Horizontal Triple Expansion Surface Condensing Pumping Engine. The same year money was invested to drain and work the Tywarnhayle mine near Porthtowan, Cornwall. Water was piped out by Cornwall's first electrical centrifugal pumps, made by Worthington, at the rate of 1,000 imperial gallons (4,500 L; 1,200 US gal) per minute. In 1910 the company built a horizontal pumping engine for the Waddon Pumping Station at Croydon, Surrey. This engine is preserved at the Kew Bridge Steam Museum. In 1910 the company's registered office was 153 Queen Victoria St, London, while the works were at Newark.

In 1917 the company name was changed to Worthington Simpson. American associates had gained control of the company. Alfred Telford Simpson, who had been chairman of James Simpson & Co., continued as chairman of Worthington-Simpson until his death in 1928. Worthington-Simpson was one of the leaders in the manufacture of engines and pumps for the remainder of the 20th century.

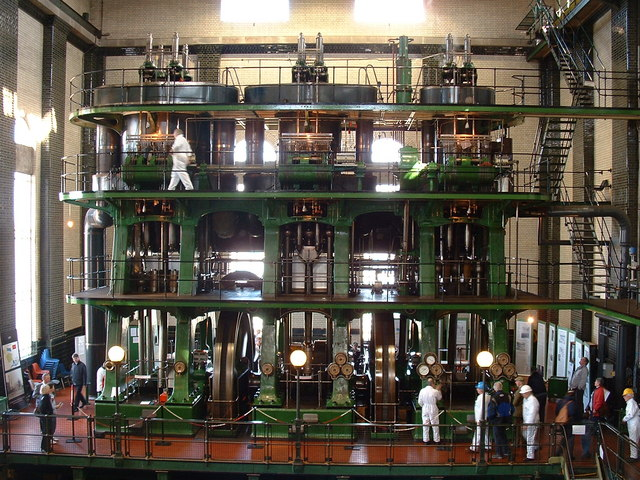
Kempton Park Engine No. 6 in steam on an open day in 2006

Worthington-Simpson built a horizontal engine with gear drive for Eastbury Station of the Watford Waterworks in 1920. The company designed and built two triple expansion steam engines for the Kempton Park Water Works. They are thought to have been the second largest such engines in the world. They came into operation in 1929, and continued to be used until 1980. They and the building they are in have now become the Kempton Great Engines Trust museum. At the Mill Dam site near Cottingham, East Riding of Yorkshire, three sets of triple expansion steam engines and pumps from Worthington-Simpson were installed between 1932 and 1934 to extract water from three boreholes to supply Kingston upon Hull.

The Worthington Pump and Machinery Corporation (later named the Worthington Corporation) of the United States purchased a stake in Worthington-Simpson in 1933. In 1936 Worthington-Simpson left the works on Grosvenor Road, which were demolished. That year preference shares were issued to enable repurchase from Worthington Corporation. At the same time, Worthington-Simpson and Worthington Pump and Machinery established agreements to maintain their connections.

In 1936 the company built eight direct-acting pumps for the Marham Station of Wisbech Waterworks. The Brede Valley Waterworks, on the north bank of the River Brede near Brede, East Sussex, was built in the early 1900s. A more recent building houses a Worthington-Simpson pumping engine dating from 1940. During World War II (1939-1945) a Worthington Simpson Pump driven by a Rolls-Royce Kestrel engine was used in a flamethrower known as the Heavy Pump Unit that could project liquid at 3,400 litres (750 imp gal; 900 US gal) per minute, producing a huge jet of flame. In 1961 Worthington-Simpson was described as manufacturers of pumps, compressors and heat exchange equipment. The company had 1,300 employees.

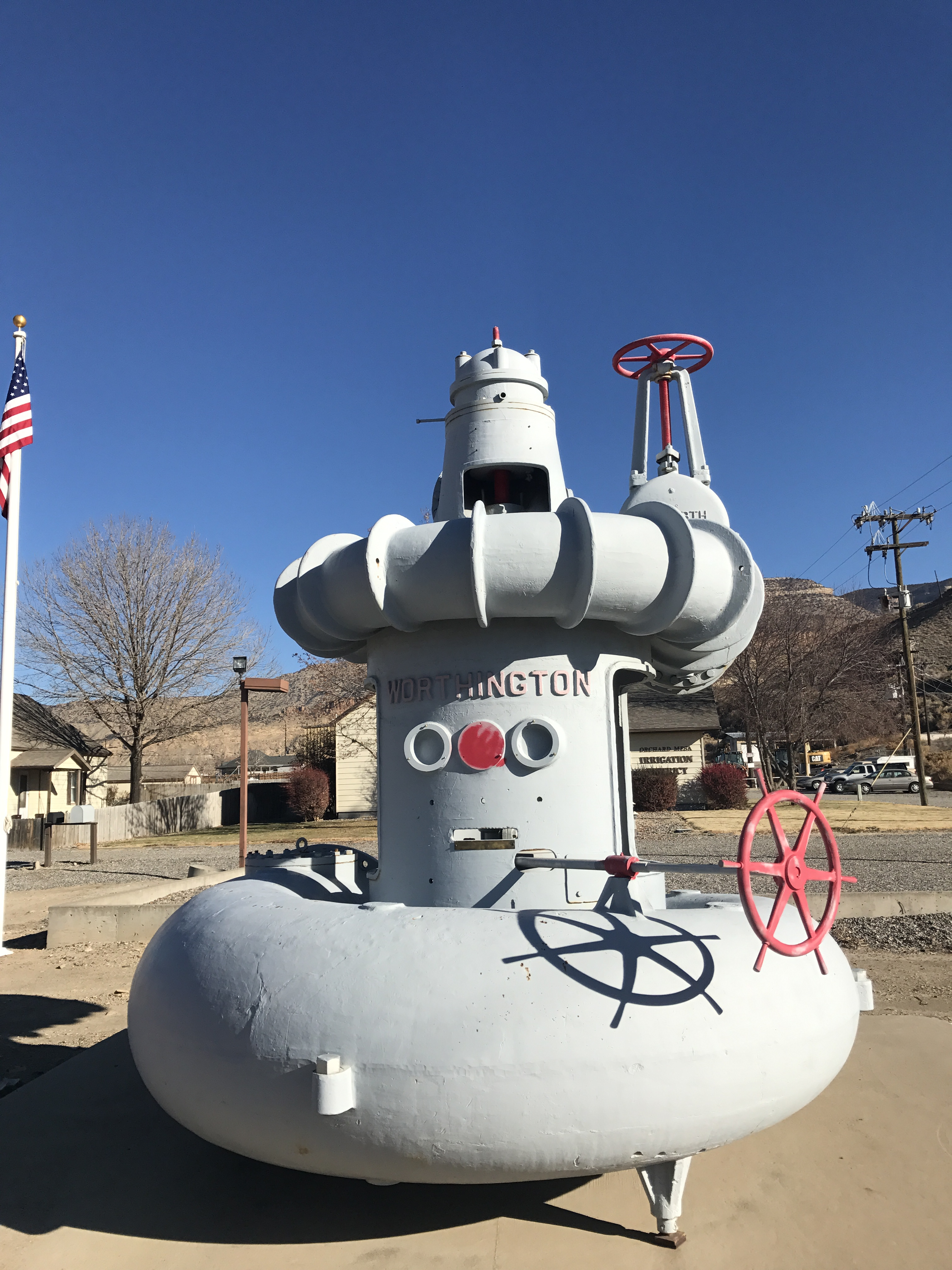
Worthington Irrigation Pump

== Subsidiary ==
In 1967 Studebaker merged with Worthington Corporation to create Studebaker-Worthington. The merger was completed in November 1967, creating a company with $550 million of assets. The new company owned 10% of Newark-based Worthington-Simpson. Studebaker-Worthington made an offer to buy Worthington Simpson, which was followed by an offer from Weir Group, a British pump manufacturer, in December 1968. In 1969 Studebaker-Worthington acquired Worthington-Simpson. After some negotiation, Weir's acquired 50% of Worthington Simpson. A new joint-venture company named Worthington Weir was set up to handle international sales of the two parent companies.

The debt taken on by Weir to acquire their share of Worthington-Simpson was denominated in Deutsche Marks, and as that currency strengthened against sterling and the dollar it became increasingly expensive to service. Worthington-Simpson was profitable, but did not cover the cost of debt. During the next decade Weir was forced to sell off many assets, and was forced to make a financial reconstruction in 1981. In 1985 Dresser Industries acquired the subsidiary. In 1992 Dresser and Ingersoll-Rand merged their pump manufacturing operations into Ingersoll Dresser Pumps Inc. This was acquired in 2000 by Flowserve Corporation, which had been formed in 1997 through a merger of Durco International and BW/IP International.
