= Stoddard-Dayton =

Defunct American motor vehicle manufacturer

The Dayton Motor Car Company
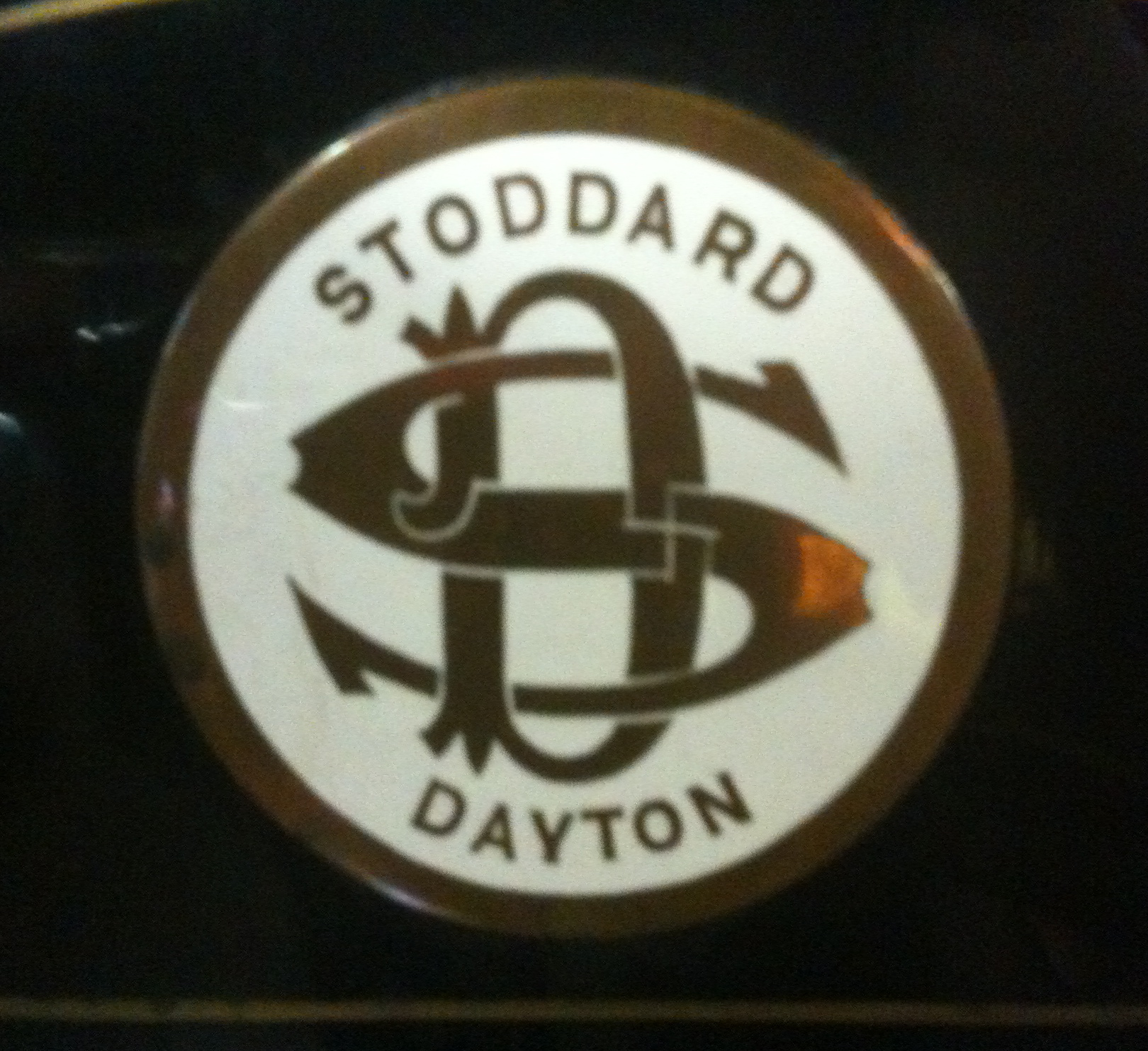
- Stoddard-Dayton logo, circa 1912
- Type: Automobile Manufacturing
- Industry: Automotive
- Genre: Touring cars, runabouts, limousines
- Founded: 1905; 121 years ago
- Founder: John W. Stoddard and his son Charles G. Stoddard
- Defunct: 1913; 113 years ago
- Headquarters: Dayton, Ohio, United States
- Area served: United States
- Products: Vehicles; Automotive parts

1911 Stoddard Dayton Model 11-A

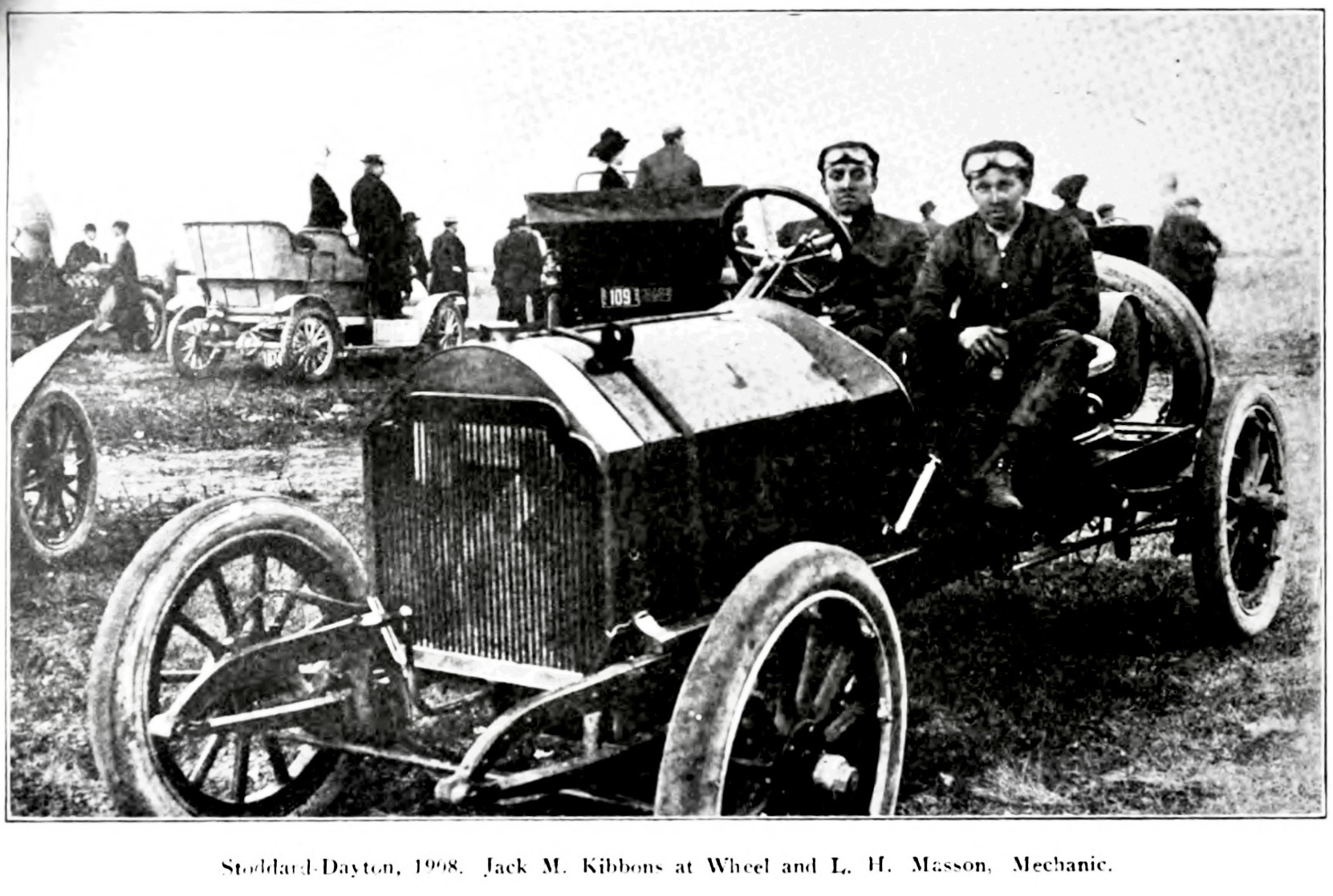
Stoddard-Dayton (1908) race car

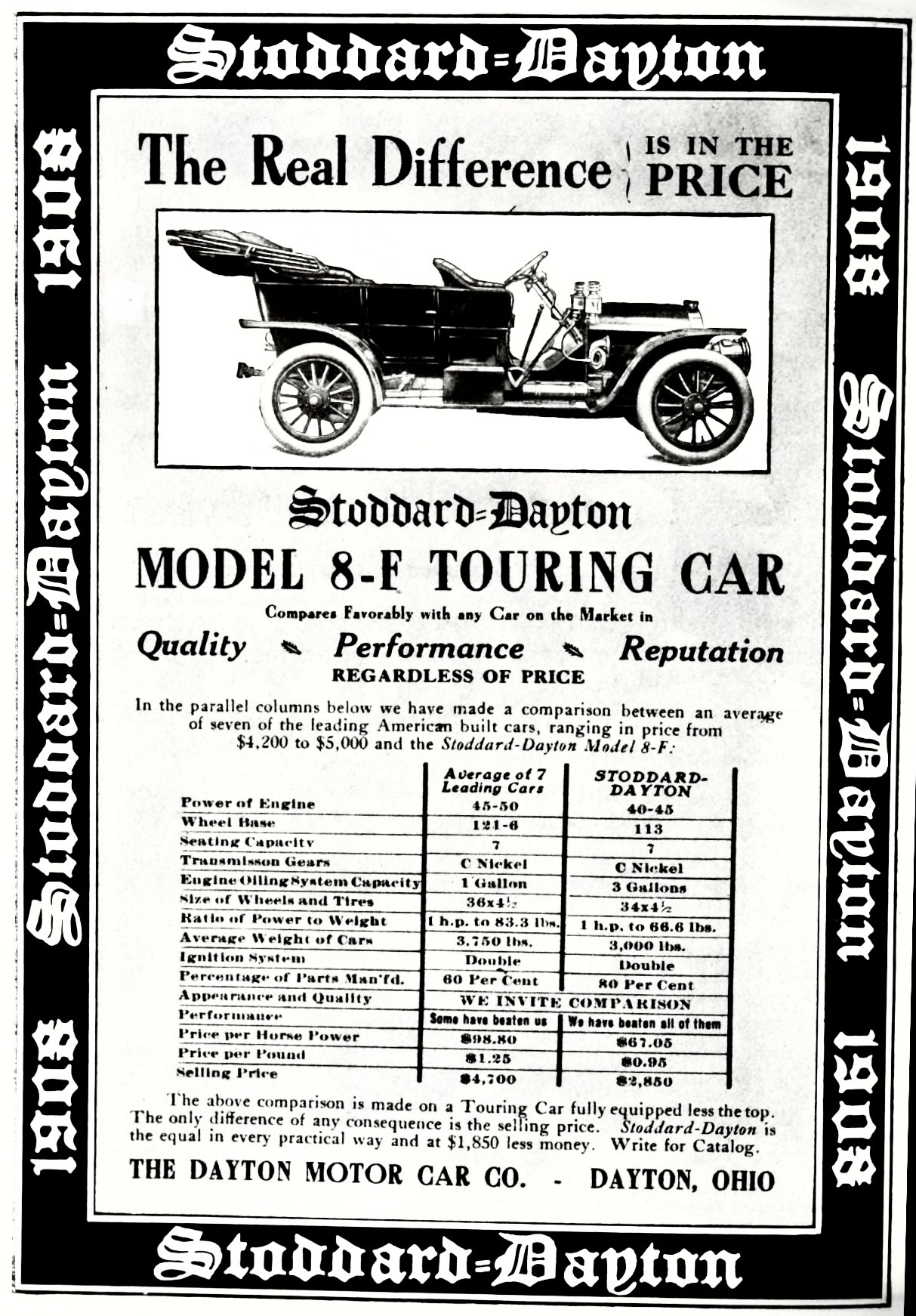
Stoddard-Dayton Model 8-F (1908)

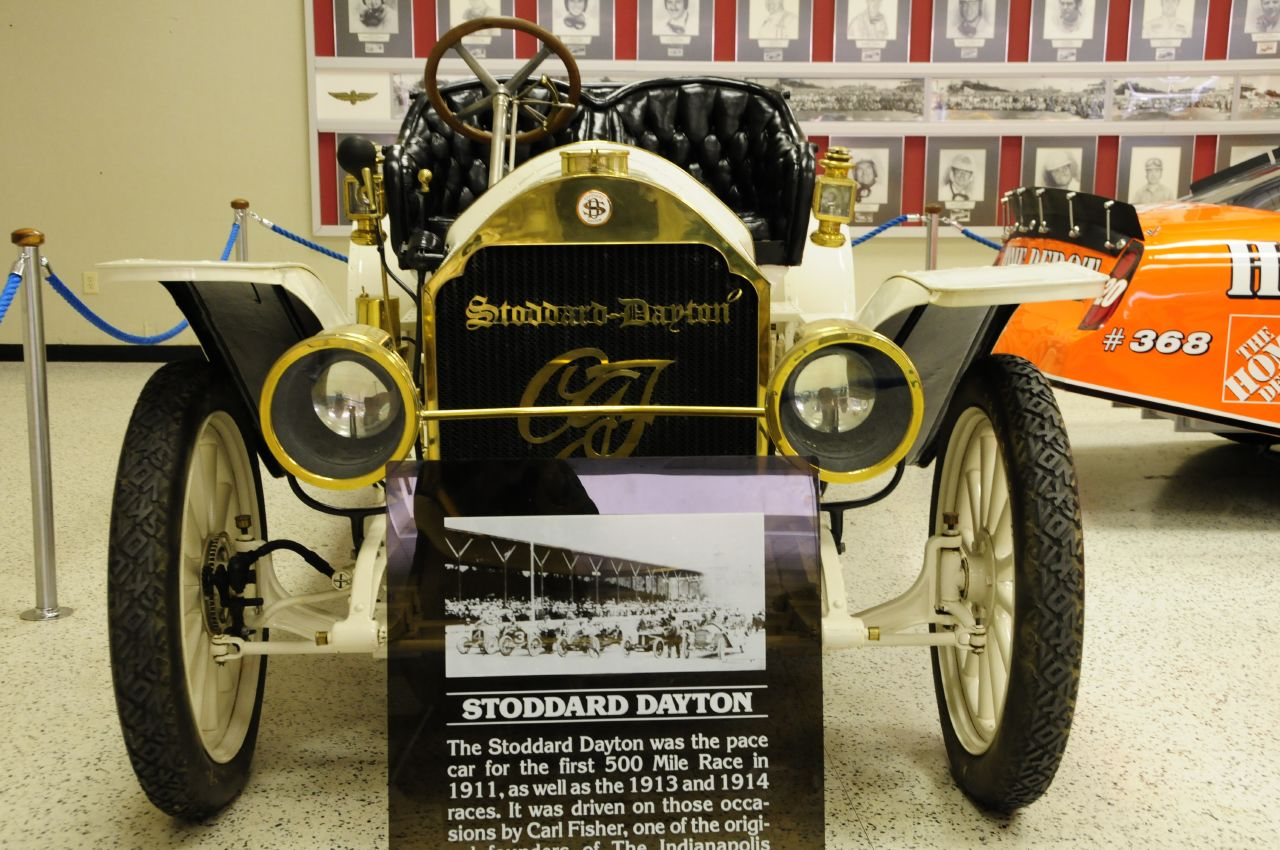
Stoddard-Dayton

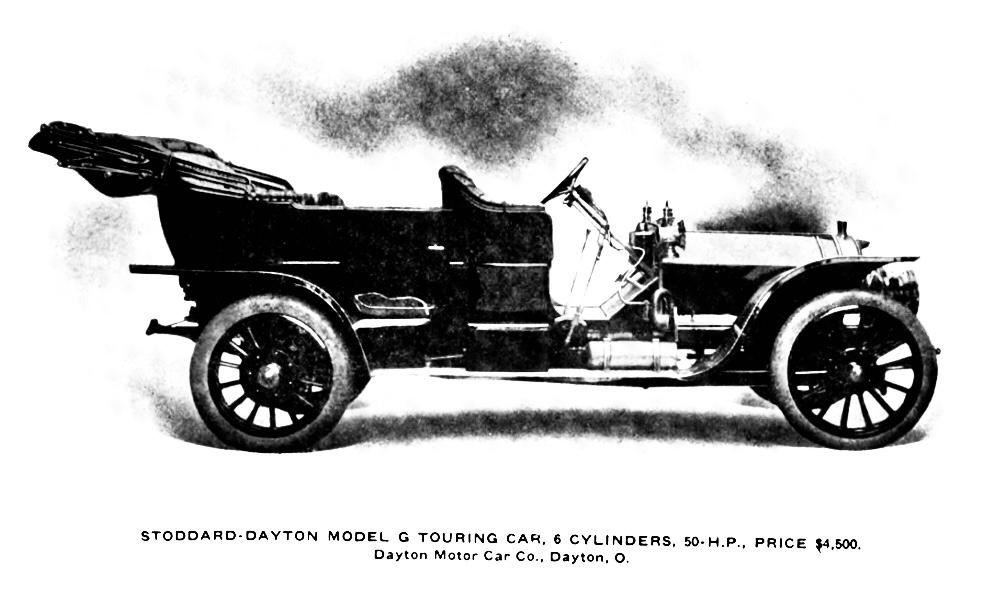
Stoddard-Dayton Model G (1908)

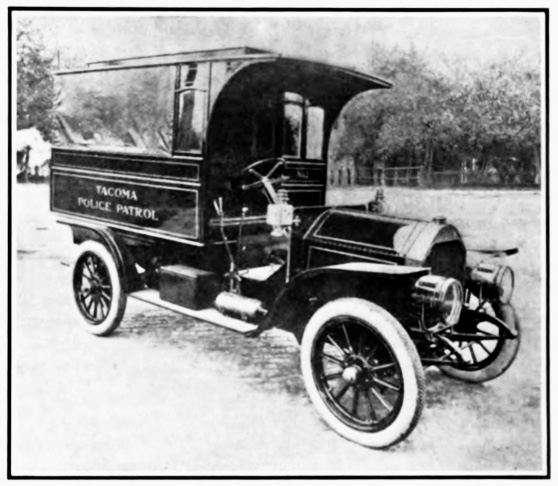
Stoddard-Dayton 45 hp Police Car (1908)

Stoddard-Dayton was a high quality car manufactured by Dayton Motor Car Company in Dayton, Ohio, US, between 1905 and 1913. John W. Stoddard and his son Charles G. Stoddard were the principals in the company.

== History ==
In 1904, John Stoddard decided to exit the agricultural implement business from which he had earned his fortune and instead to manufacture high quality automobiles for the emerging market in the United States. He sent his son Charles to Europe to tour continental automobile manufacturers. Charles returned convinced that electricity and steam were outmoded forms of propulsion. The earliest cars used Rutenber engines ("Let your steed be worthy of your chariot") and had 4605 cc engines. Six-cylinder engines appeared in 1907. The final range consisted of three four-cylinder models and a Knight sleeve valve six.

The company adopted a strategy of building the highest quality motor cars with powerful engines. Henry J. Edwards (b. ca 1872 England–) was the auto designer and Chief Engineer of the company. Low-end models were dressed in 15 to 18 coats of paint, each coat hand sanded and rubbed out. The limousine model had 27 or 28 coats of paint, similarly applied. After assembly, each car was driven on public roads for 150 miles (240 km) to 400 miles (640 km), then the engine was disassembled, the cylinders re-honed, valves touched up, and then reassembled and road tested again.

Cars began to be delivered in late 1905, sold as 1906 models. Stoddard established a reputation as winning race cars in sprint races, hill climbs and dirt track races all over the Midwest. Because these cars were all stock models, Dayton Motor Car lost no time in letting the motoring public know. In 1909, a two-seater Stoddard-Dayton won the first race at Indianapolis Motor Speedway, averaging 57.3 miles per hour (92.2 km/h). The first pace car ever was a Stoddard-Dayton driven by Carl G. Fisher to start the Indianapolis 500 in 1911.

In 1906 there were three models:

- Runabout, $1,250, equipped with 15 horsepower (11 kW) "T"-head engine
- Touring car, $2,250
- Limousine, $3,200, equipped with 35 horsepower (26 kW) engine (and 28 coats of paint)

Frank Lloyd Wright's first car was a 1908 Stoddard-Dayton Model K roadster.

In 1909, Stoddard-Dayton formed the Courier Car Co in Dayton to produce a smaller, lighter, and lower-priced version of the Stoddard-Dayton, called the Courier.

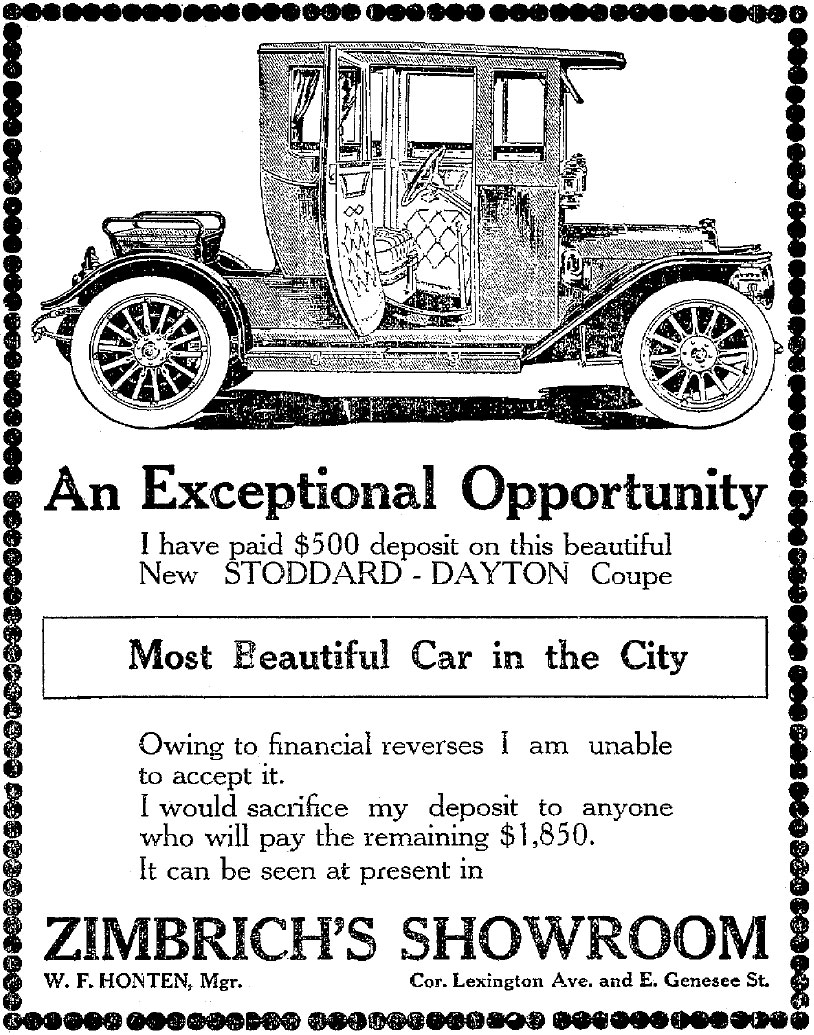
A 1911 Stoddard-Dayton Advertisement - Syracuse Post-Standard, November 6, 1922

By 1911, Stoddard-Dayton offered twenty models with four different engines—limousines, landaulets, coupes, touring, torpedoes, roadsters, trucks, taxicabs, delivery wagons. Examples include:

- "Savoy," $1,350, equipped with 28 horsepower (21 kW) engine
- "Stratford," equipped with 38 horsepower (28 kW) engine
- "Saybrook," equipped with 48 horsepower (36 kW) engine
- "Special," equipped with 58 horsepower (43 kW) engine
- "Stoddard-Dayton-Knight limousine," $6,250, with six-cylinder 70 horsepower (52 kW) engine

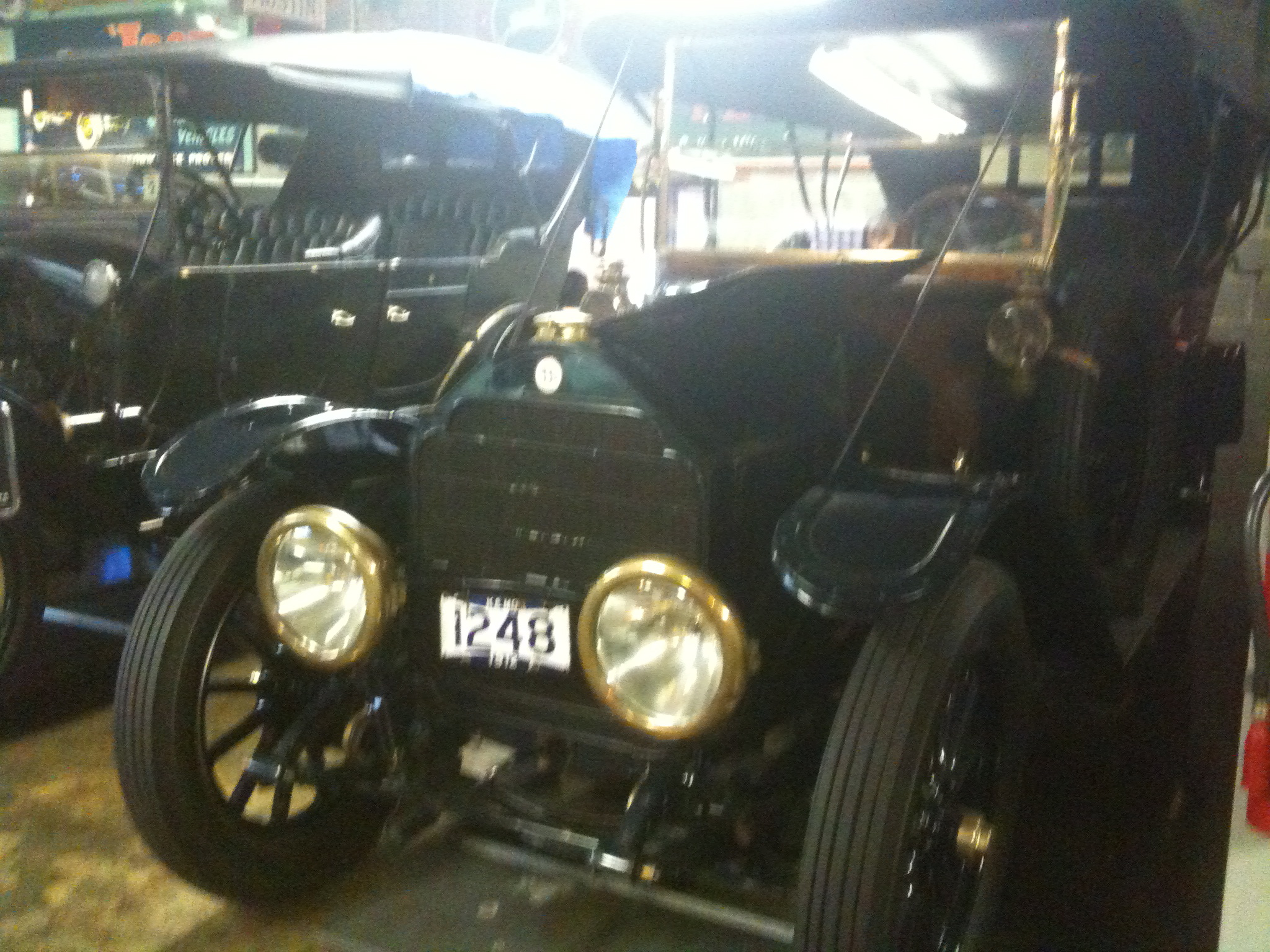
1912 Stoddard-Dayton "Knight" Seven-Passenger Touring

In 1912, about 25,000 automobiles in twenty-six models were manufactured. In June 1912, Stoddard-Dayton became part of the United States Motor Company, which advertised the Stoddard-Dayton line with the simple statement: "None can go farther. None can go faster." They made an advance purchase of a large volume of engines from Atlas Engine Works (Indianapolis, Indiana) and made commitments for 30,000 chassis, factors that contributed to financial instability. In February 1912, Charles Stoddard resigned as Vice President of United States Motor Company, and Henry Edwards resigned as Chief Designer to form the Edwards Motor Car Company. Stoddard remained a Director of USMC and continued his financial holdings. However, United States Motor Company went into receivership in late 1912 and failed in bankruptcy in 1913. The Stoddard-Dayton went down with it.

The assets of the Dayton Motor Car Company were purchased by the reorganized Maxwell where parts were manufactured for assembly at New Castle, Indiana and later Detroit, Michigan. In 1913, Maxwell continued to offer the Stoddard-Dayton models 30, 38 and 48 (Savoy, Stratford and Saybrook), although these may have been leftover 1912 models. The 1913 model 48 offered a self-starter and electric lighting for an additional $200. When Maxwell later was itself reorganized, it became part of Chrysler Corporation and the Dayton division became Chrysler AirTemp.

Stoddard-Dayton was slow to react to the emergence of a mass market and maintained a high-quality strategy after automobiles ceased to be exclusively rich men's status symbols. They were building cars as good as possible while Ford and General Motors were building as cheap as possible. Stoddard-Dayton continued to expand model offerings at all price points, but never changed fundamental manufacturing methods. The classic example of this was the 11-part radiator cap on the limousine—body, two pins, gasket, gasket retainer, screws, and latch. It was permanently attached to the radiator so that it could not be lost or stolen and could be opened with a flip of the locking lever, even when the engine was hot. Meanwhile, in Detroit, a Ford punch press was punching out caps and then an operation applied threads. True, the threads sometimes stuck and it could not be removed when the radiator was hot—but the Model T was selling for $399.

== Production models ==
- Stoddard-Dayton Model 8 F
- Stoddard-Dayton Model 10 H
- Stoddard-Dayton Model 10 B
- Stoddard-Dayton Model 10 A
- Stoddard-Dayton Model 10 C4
- Stoddard-Dayton Model 10 T
- Stoddard-Dayton Model 10 K
- Stoddard-Dayton Model 10 F
- Stoddard-Dayton Model 11 F
- Stoddard-Dayton Model 11 K
- Stoddard-Dayton Model 11 A
- Stoddard-Dayton Model 11 H
- Stoddard-Dayton Model 11 M Manufactured by Courier Car Co
