= Dayton Electric =

Defunct American motor vehicle manufacturer

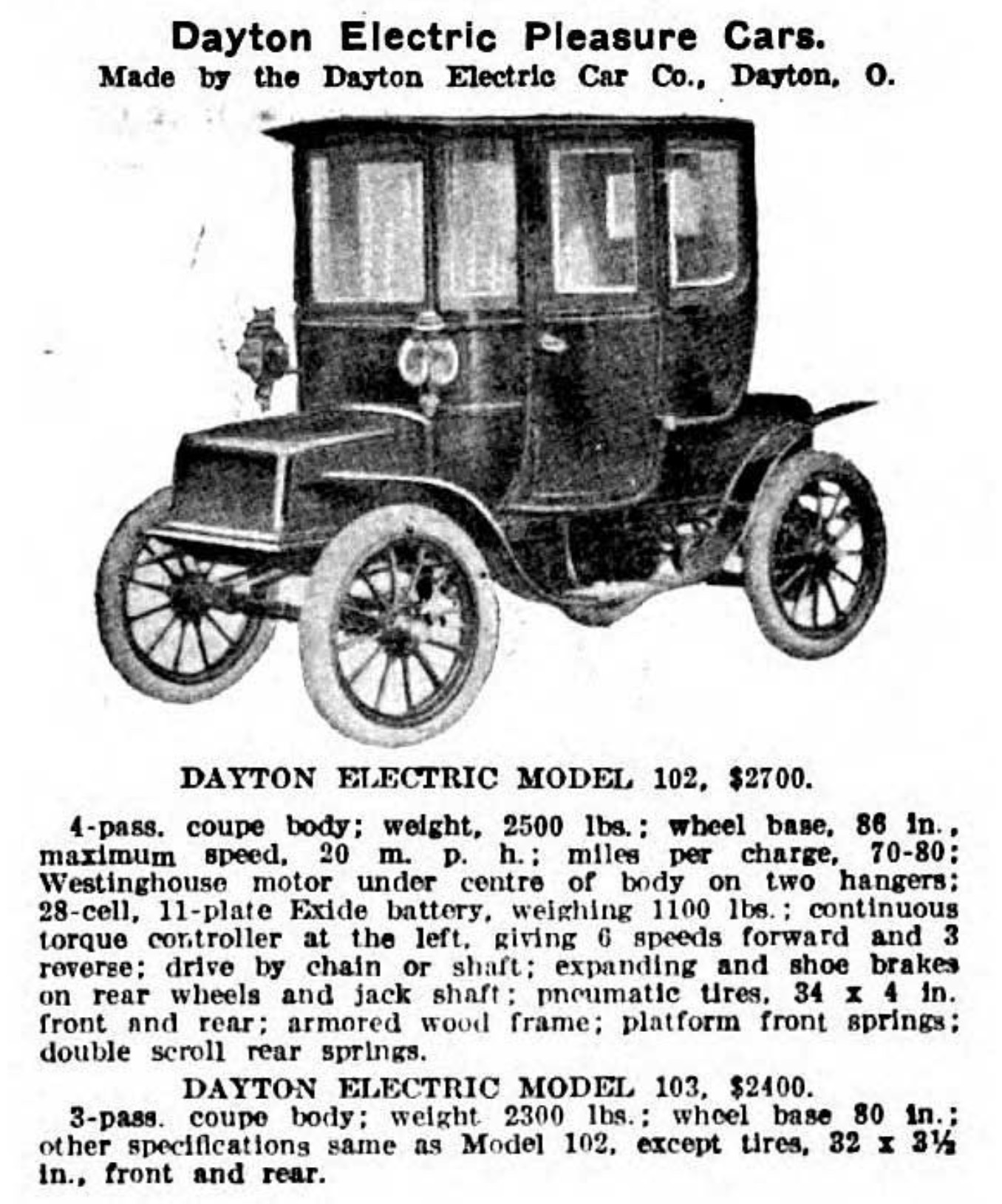
Dayton advertisement

The Dayton Electric was an American electric car manufactured in Dayton, Ohio, from 1911 until 1915; the company offered a complex range of vehicles.
