= Woods Motor Vehicle =

American electric automobile manufacturing company, trading between 1899 and 1916

Woods Motor Vehicle Company
- Industry: Automotive
- Founded: September 28, 1899
- Founder: Clinton Edgar Woods
- Fate: went out of business
- Headquarters: 1130 South Wabash Avenue, Chicago, Illinois, US
- Products: Automobiles

Woods Motor Vehicle Company was an American manufacturer of electric automobiles in Chicago, Illinois, between 1899 and 1916. In 1915, they produced the Dual Power with both electric and internal combustion engines, which continued until 1918.

The company was founded by Clinton Edgar Woods, who wrote the first book on electric vehicles, The Electric Automobile: Its Construction, Care and Operation.

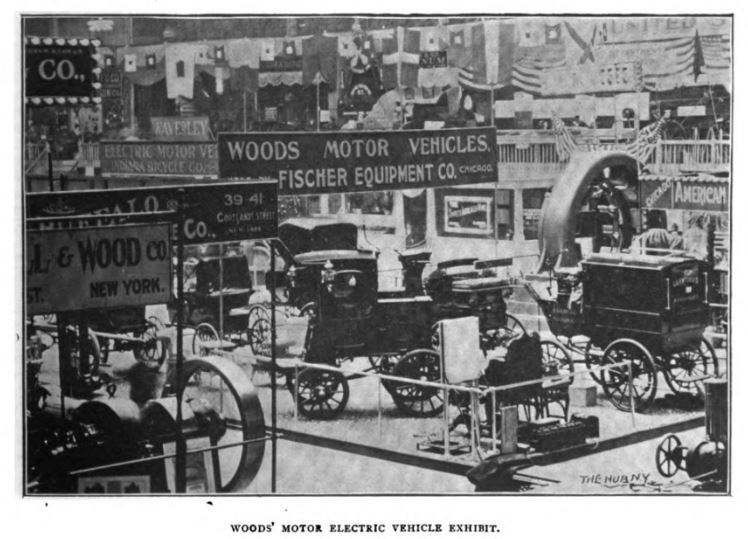
Woods Motor Vehicle's exhibit at the May 1899 electric show

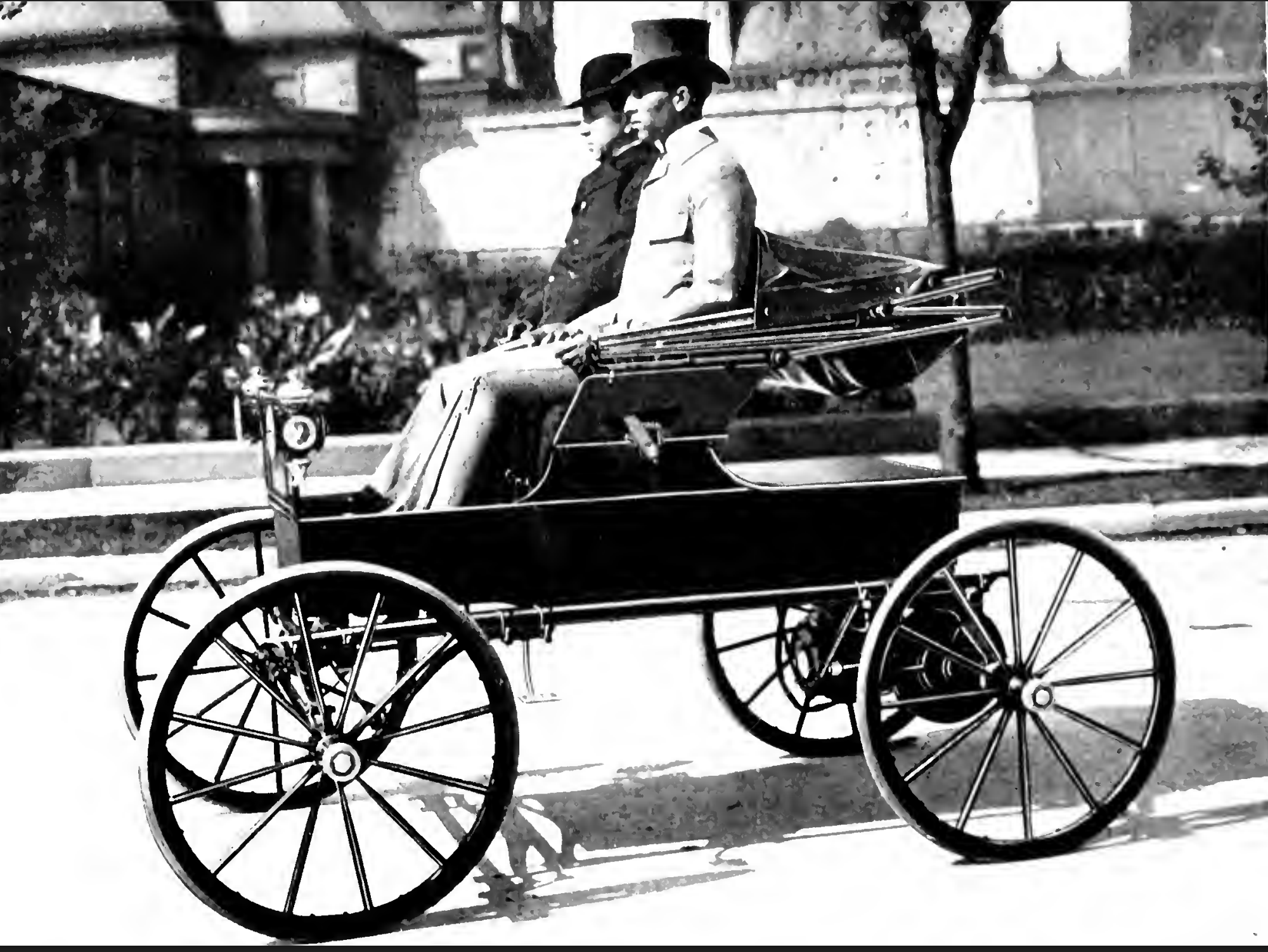
The Woods electric automobile circa 1900

Woods advertisement (1901) part 1

Woods advertisement (1901) part 2

The 1904 Woods Stanhope was a Stanhope model. It could seat two passengers and sold for $1,800. Twin electric motors, situated at the rear of the car, produced 2.5 hp (1.9 kW) each. The car weighed 2,650 lb (1,200 kg) with a 40 cell battery.

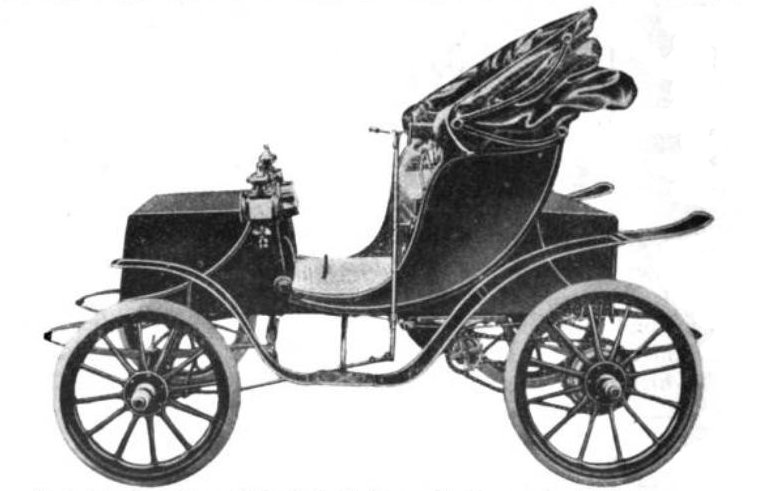
1906 Woods Victoria model

The 1904 Woods Victoria was also a Stanhope carriage-style model. It could seat two passengers and sold for $1,900. The Victoria had a tiller steering control.

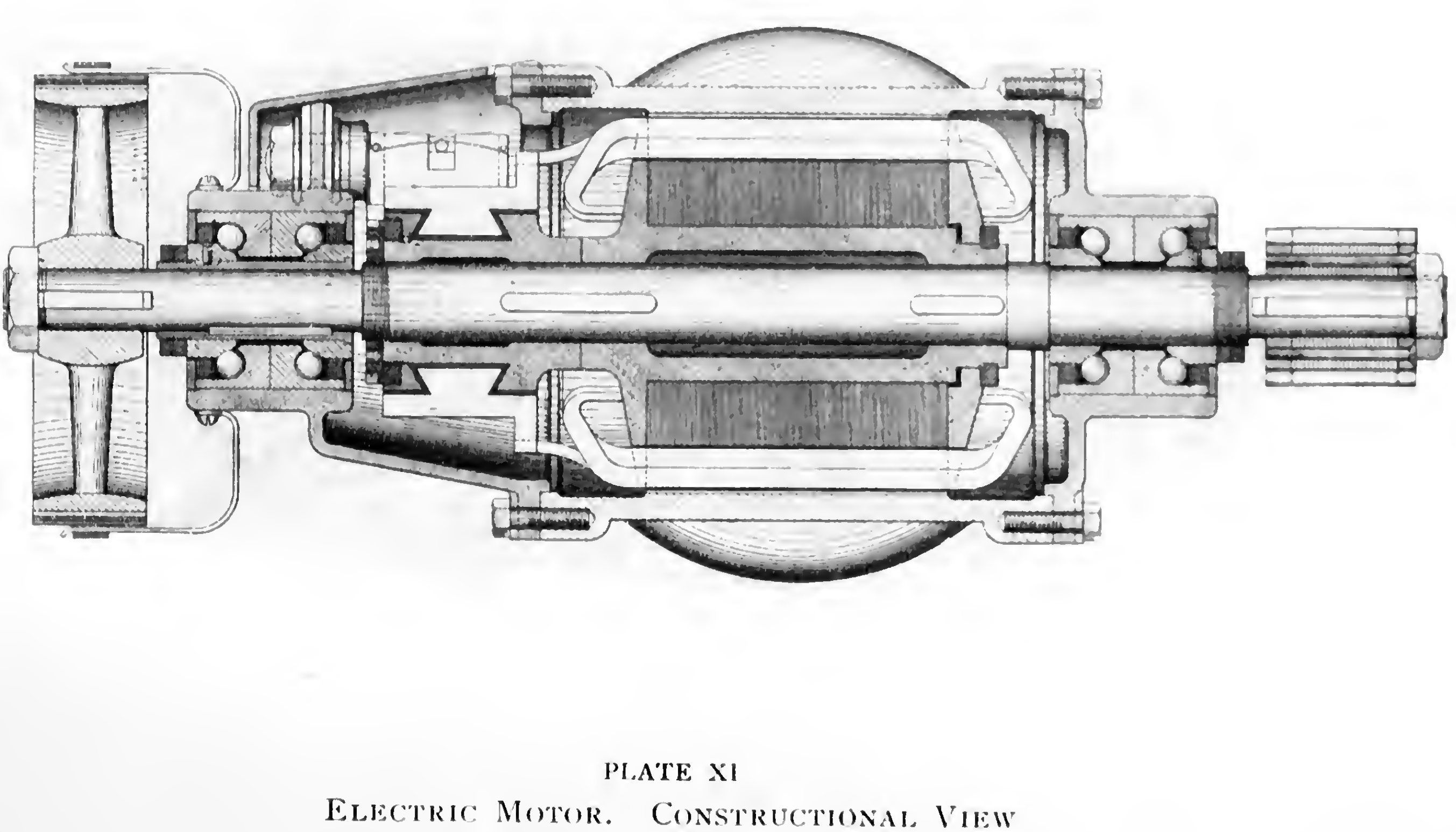
The Woods Electric Vehicle electric motor

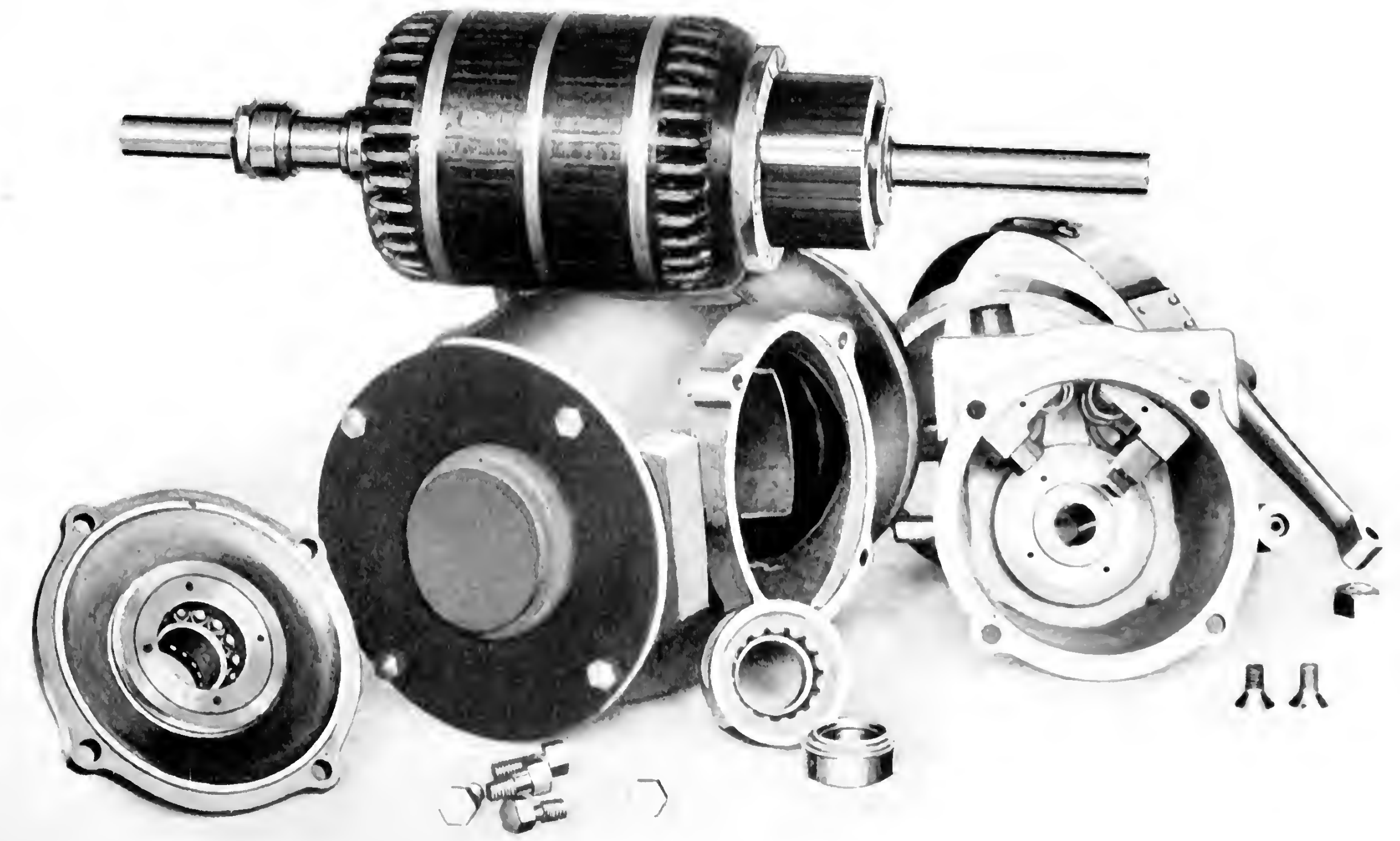
An exploded view of the electric motor

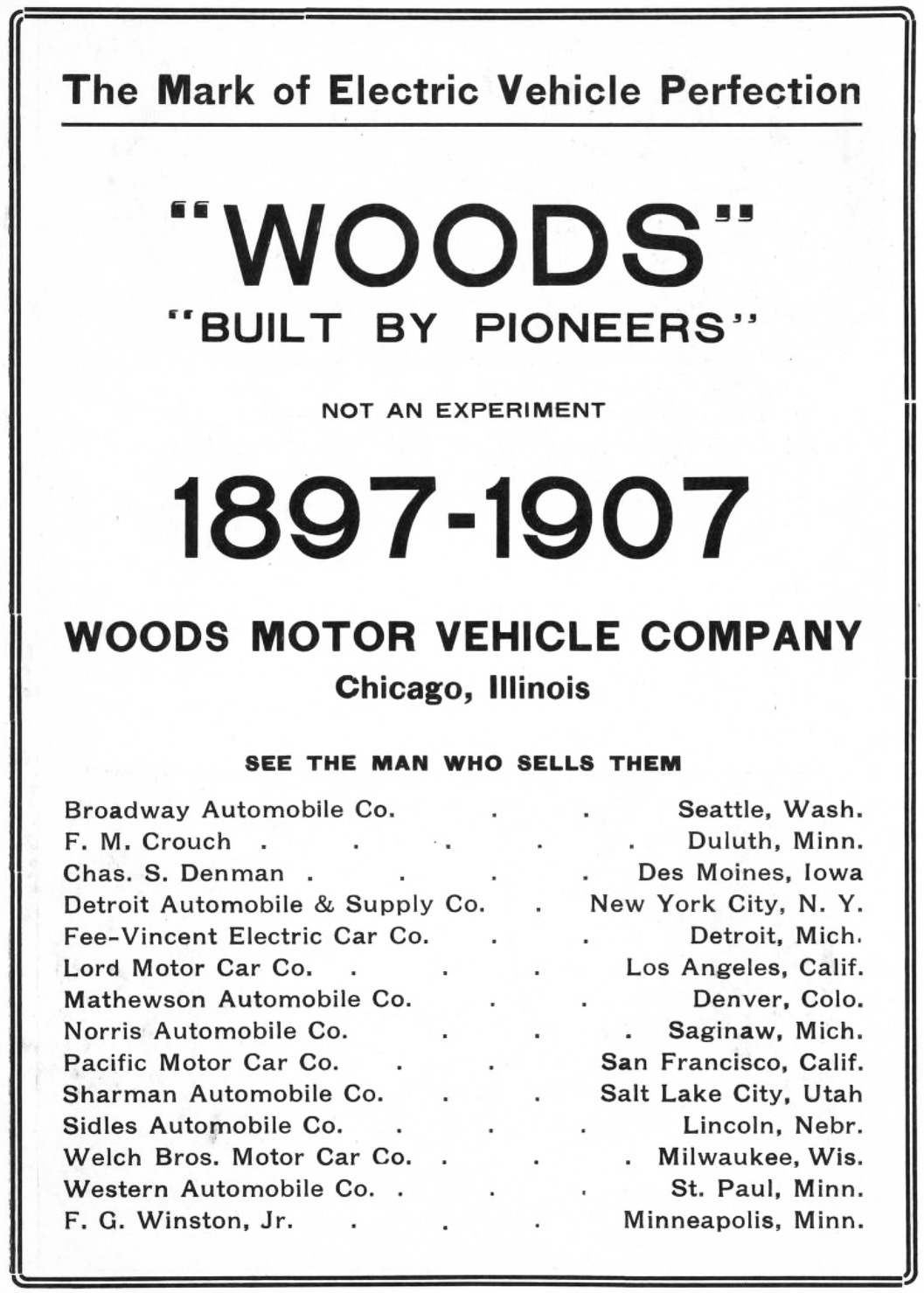
Woods Motor Vehicle Company advertisement (1907)

A single electric motor was used; the motor was mounted on the front center of the rear axle in a sealed housing parallel to the axle and connected by gears. Four forward speeds were provided by a lever mounted on the left side of the seat controlling a mechanical rotary switch that selected taps on the series of batteries, thereby controlling the voltage provided to the motor and thus the forward speed. One reverse speed was provided by pulling the detent speed selector all the way to the rear. The car weighed 2,700 lb (1,200 kg). A forty-cell battery stack was used, with an 18 mph (29 km/h) top speed and range of approximately 25 miles (40 kilometres). The Victoria had a band brake on the rear axle and scrub brakes on the rear wheels for additional braking when going downhill.

== Founding ==
The Woods Motor Vehicle Company was founded on September 28, 1899, with a capitalization of $10,000,000. It was incorporated under the laws of New Jersey. It assumed the patents of the Fischer Equipment Company of Chicago and a factory at 110–120 East Twentieth Street, Chicago, with plans to upgrade another facility at 547 Wabash Avenue for another factory. Frederick Nichols of Toronto, Canada, was installed as the first president, and C.E. Woods was installed as one of the company's directors.

The headquarters and showroom for the Woods Motor Vehicle Company were located in an 1891 loft structure in Chicago's early Motor Row at the modern address of 1130 South Wabash Avenue, near the intersection with modern Roosevelt Road. (Chicago introduced its present address and street name system beginning in 1909.) The building long outlived the Woods Motor Vehicle Company, but demolition of the historic building began in the autumn of 2024.

== Early hybrid ==
At $2,700, the Dual Power Model 44 coupe of 1911 to 1918 had a four-cylinder internal combustion engine as well as electric power. Below 15 mph (24 km/h), the car was electric powered, and above it the conventional engine took over to take the vehicle to a maximum of around 35 mph (56 km/h). It is today considered a historic hybrid electric vehicle.

Some sources wrongly state that the Woods Dual Power car manufactured by the Woods Motor Vehicle Company in Chicago also used the Entz transmission.

The Woods Dual Power had a drive-train based on Roland Fend's patent (U.S. patent 1,303,870), using a clutch between the gas engine and the electric motor, allowing the engine to also drive the car through the armature shaft of the motor, which itself was connected to the driveshaft.

The Woods car was similar in many ways to today's hybrids. It used both a gasoline engine and an electric motor to propel the wheels, had regenerative braking to recharge the less cumbersome batteries, and in some circumstances, the car could charge the batteries while running on gasoline.

== See also ==
- History of the electric vehicle
- List of defunct United States automobile manufacturers

=== Other early electric vehicles ===
- American Electric
- Argo Electric
- Babcock Electric Carriage Company
- Baker Motor Vehicle
- Berwick
- Binghamton Electric
- Buffalo Electric
- Century
- Columbia Automobile Company
- Dayton Electric
- Detroit Electric
- Grinnell
- Menominee
- Riker Electric
- Studebaker Electric
