= Rauch and Lang =

American electric automobile manufactured in Cleveland, Ohio

The Rauch & Lang Carriage Co. Baker R & L Co. Rauch & Lang, Inc.
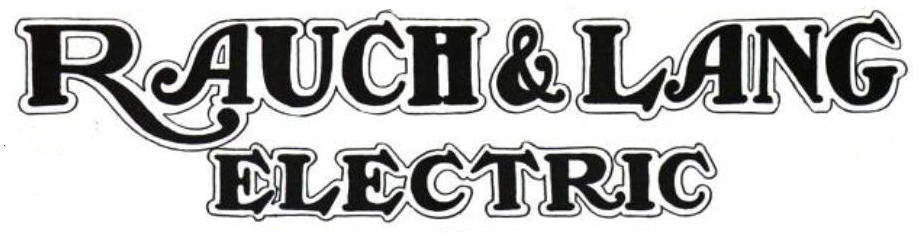

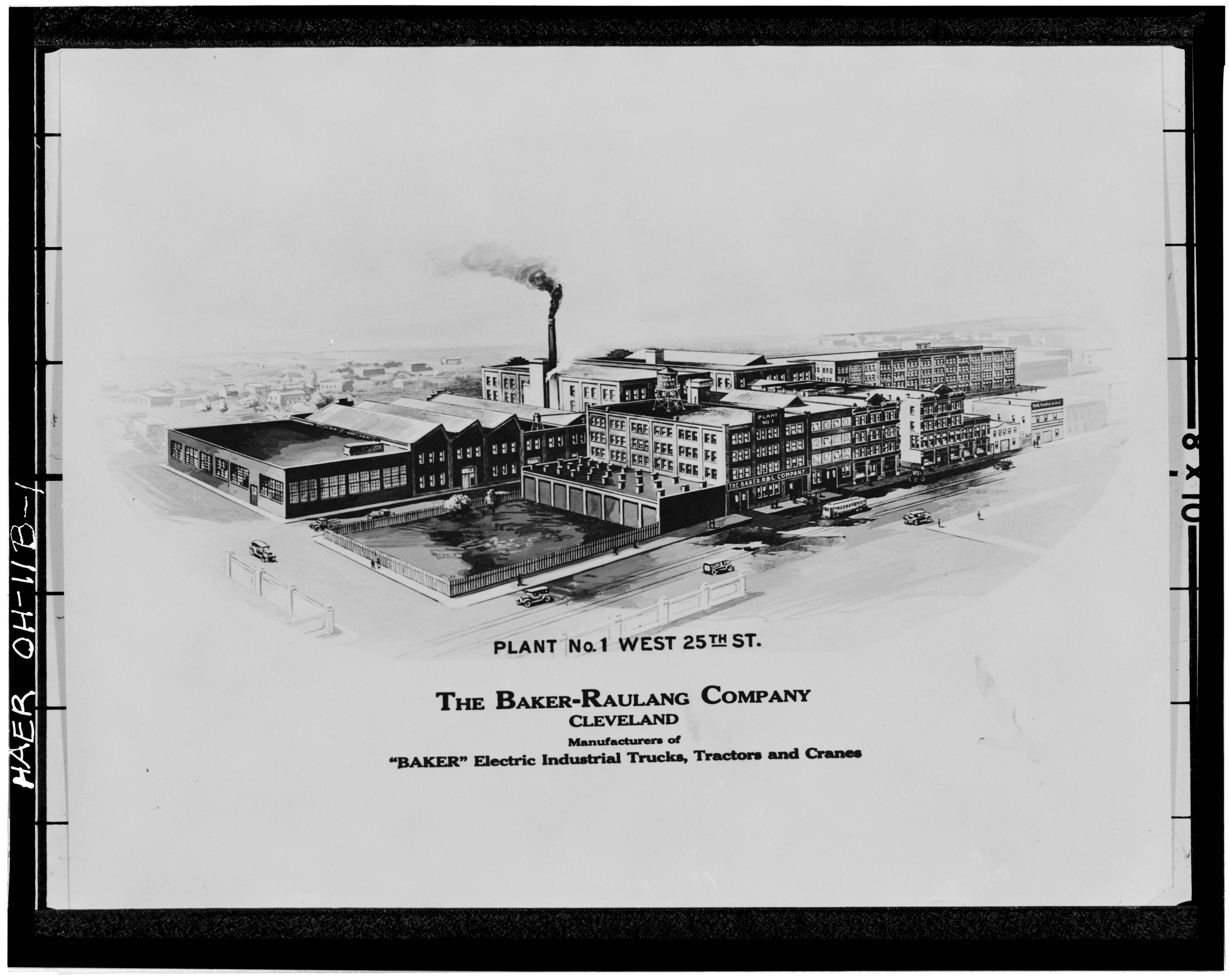
- The Baker Rulang Company - Plant no. 1
- Industry: Automotive
- Founded: 1905; 121 years ago
- Founder: Jacob Rauch and Charles E.J. Lang
- Defunct: 1928; 98 years ago
- Headquarters: Cleveland, Ohio, United States
- Products: Automobiles; Automotive parts

The Rauch & Lang Carriage Company was an American electric automobile manufactured in Cleveland, Ohio, from 1905 to 1920 and Chicopee Falls, Massachusetts, from 1920 to 1932.

== History ==
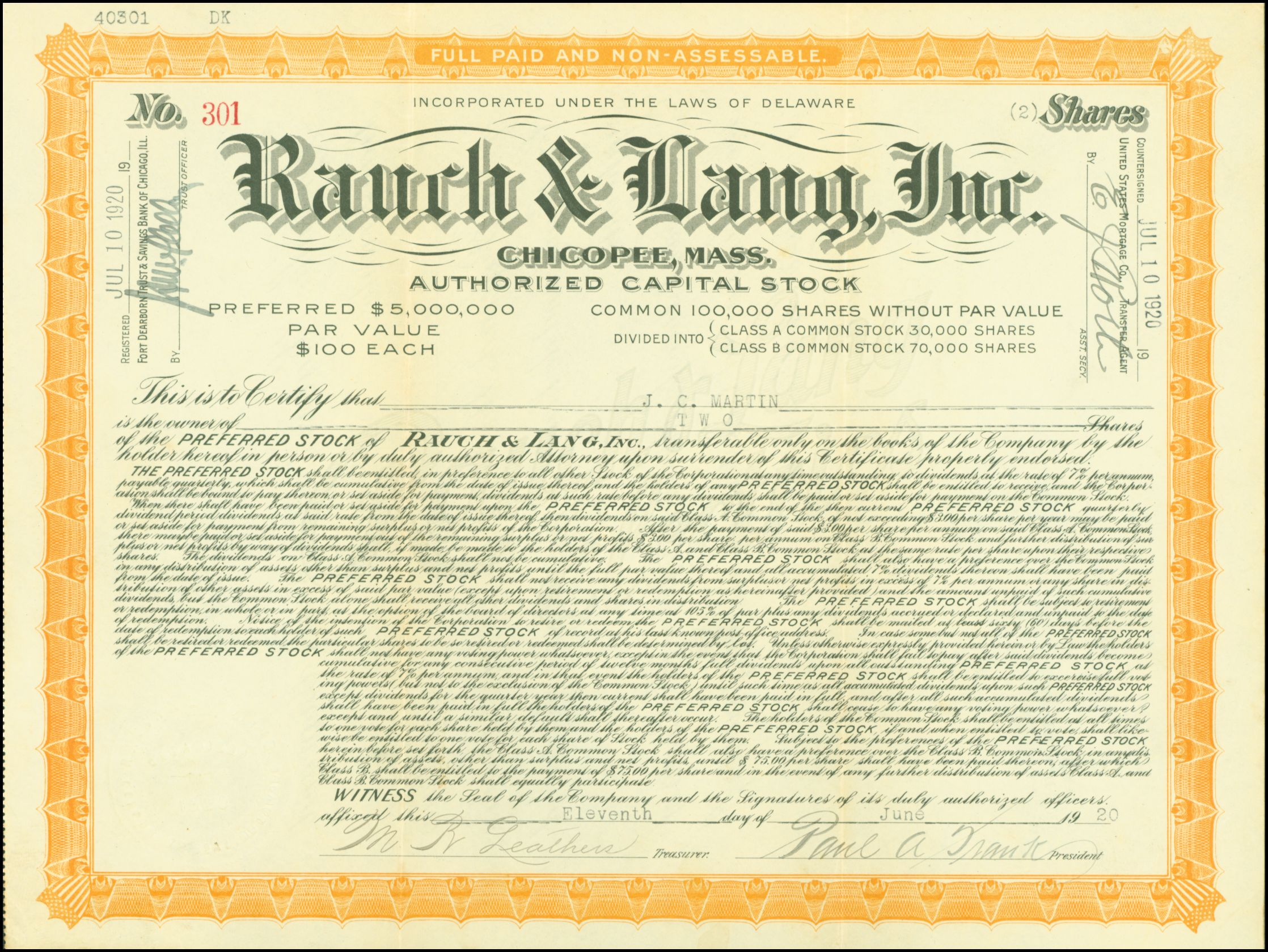
Share of the Rauch & Lang Inc., issued 11. June 1920

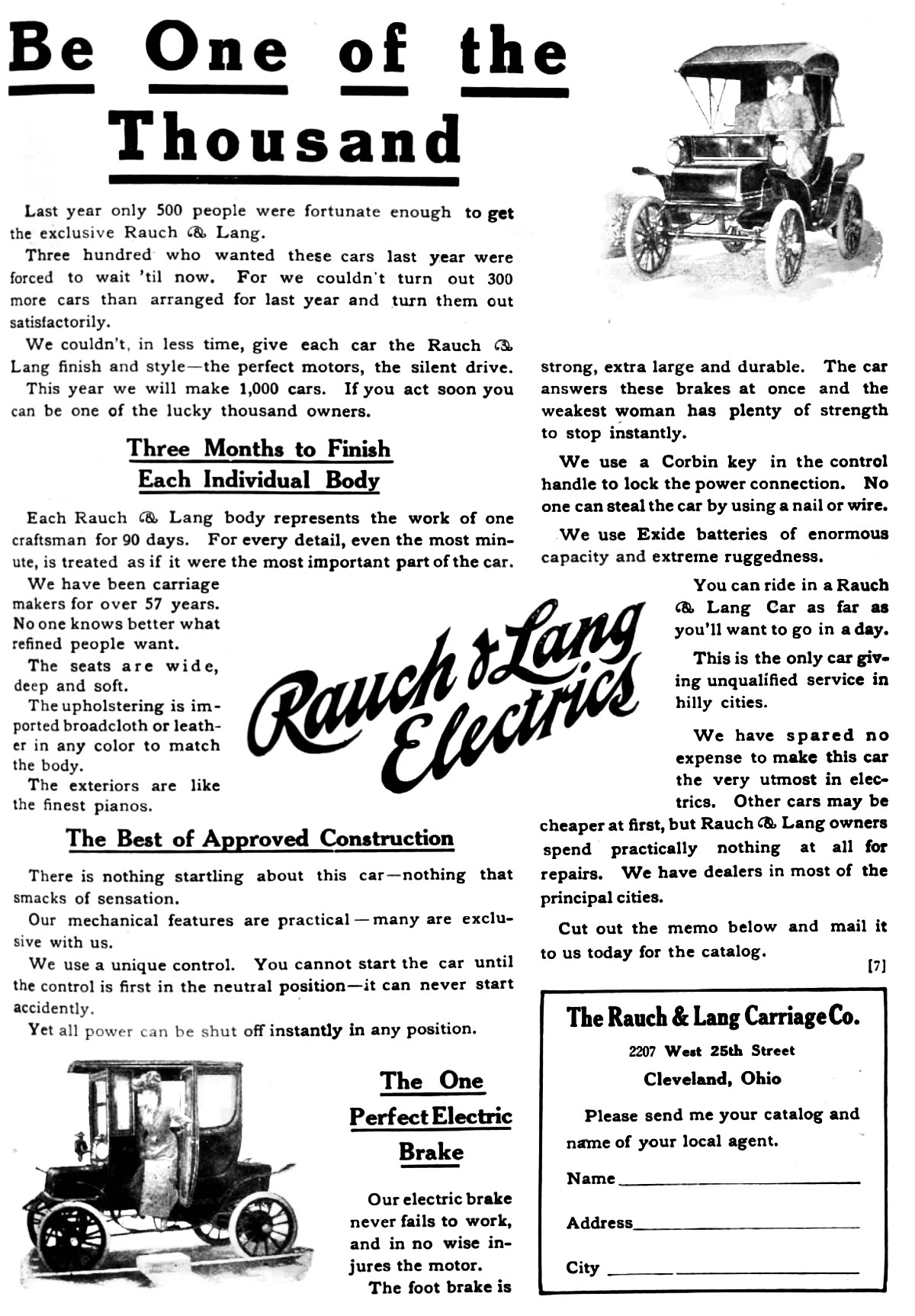
Rauch & Lang advertisement (1909)

The Rauch & Lang Carriage Company was incorporated in 1884, by Jacob Rauch and Charles E. J. Lang. Producing some of the best known and expensive carriages in Cleveland. The company entered the automotive business in 1903 by taking on the agency for the Buffalo Electric, and in 1905 offered an electric stanhope of its own manufacture.

=== Electric Motor Cars ===
50 stanhopes, coupes and depot wagons were built in the first year. In 1907 Rauch & Lang bought out the Hertner Electric Company who supplied Rauch & Lang motors and controllers; John H. Hertner became chief engineer for the Rauch & Lang automobile department. From 1907 the company made all parts of its car in its own factory.

Production increased annually, but In 1911 Rauch & Lang had endured being sued by the Baker Motor Vehicle Company for infringement of a patent relating to the mounting of rear springs.

=== Merger with Baker Electric ===
With declining electric car sales nationwide, by 1915 the two firms decided to merge. The Baker R. & L. Company was the result, though the firm became more popularly known as Baker-Raulang as did the cars.

The Baker name continued only through 1916. Electric cars were available in several body styles, including some with four doors, which was unusual for an electric. A choice of front or back-seat steering was available.

The Owen Magnetic was produced in the Baker R & L Company plants from 1916 to 1919. During 1919 a total of 700 Rauch & Lang electrics were built and the company entered automobile coach-building as Raulang Body Division of the Baker R & L Company. Another department was set-up to produce electric industrial trucks.

=== Chicopee Falls ===
In January 1920, Ray S. Deering, the president of the Stevens-Duryea Company of Chicopee Falls. Massachusetts announced that he had bought out the electric passenger car business of Baker R & L which he reorganized as Rauch & Lang, Inc. A new factory built next to the Stevens-Duryea plant in Chicopee Falls was occupied by Rauch & Lang.

In 1922, Rauch & Lang, Inc. entered the taxicab field, with production of both electric and gasoline versions marketed under the initials of R & L. From 1923, taxicab production was the mainstay of the Rauch & Lang production. The electric taxi did not sell nearly as well, and the electric passenger cars were produced only in handfuls.

From 1924 Rauch & Lang, Inc. was in financial trouble. An extension of time was granted, and the firm struggled on for a while longer. Late in 1928 half of the Rauch & Lang factory was leased to Moth Aircraft Corporation, and passenger car production ceased later that year.

=== Fate ===
Shortly before the 1929 Wall Street crash, an experimental 60 hp gas-electric was built at Rauch & Lang in collaboration with General Electric engineers. It was sold to Colonel E. H. R. Green, son of multi-millionaire Hetty Green. The stock market crash later that fall precluded any possible plans of production, but the third hybrid built in 1930 is extant. The company continued sporadic production of taxicab and coachwork into 1932.

== Gallery ==
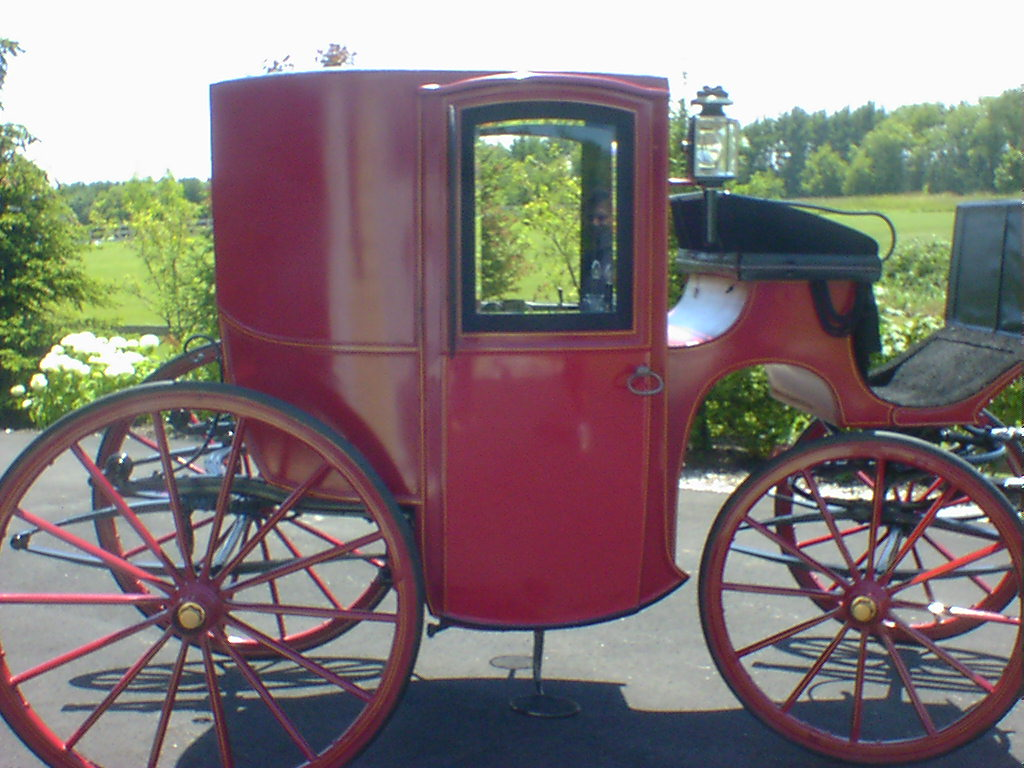
1890s Rauch & Lang Brougham

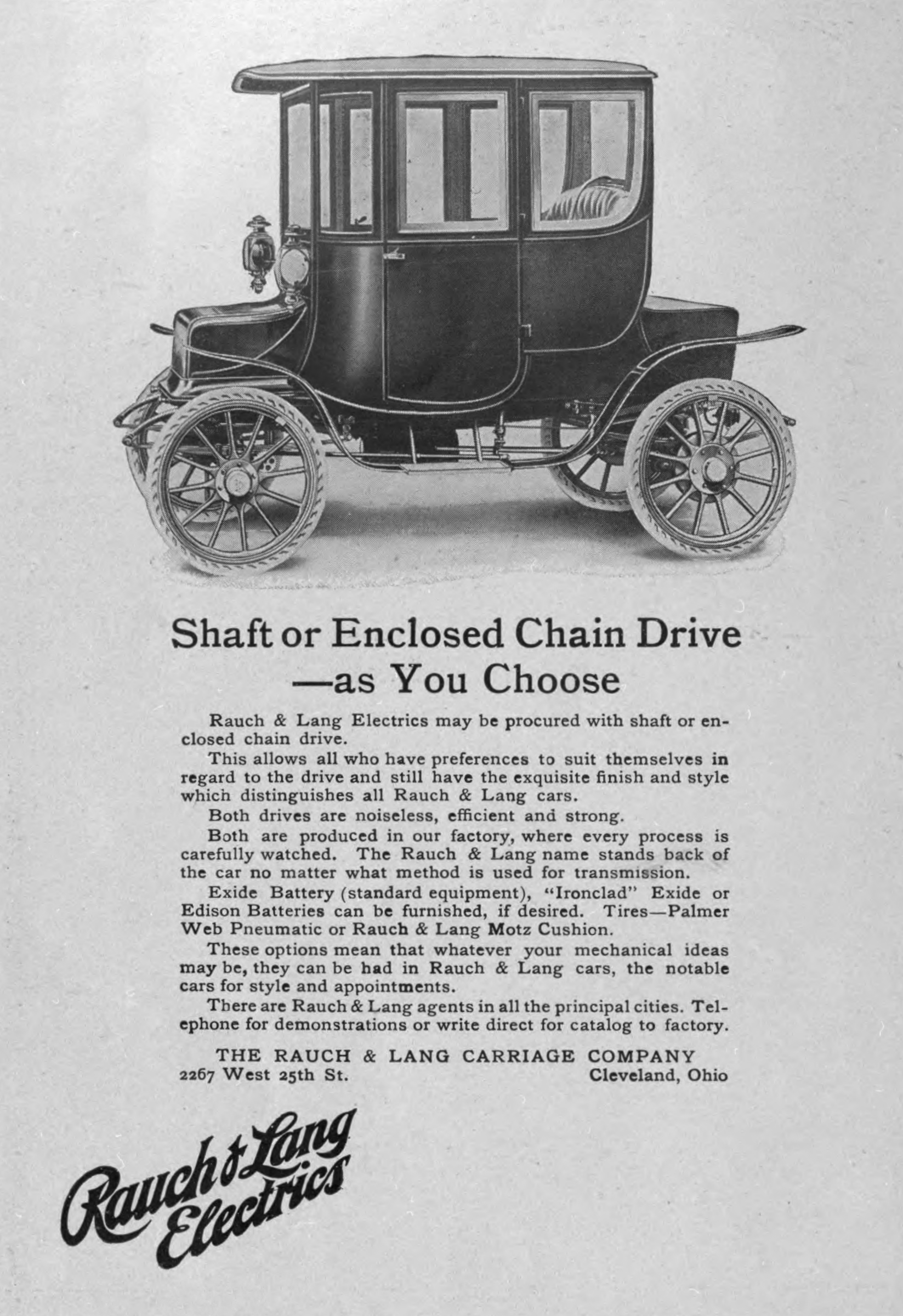
Rauch & Lang Carriage Company advertisement, Theatre magazine, Jan 1911

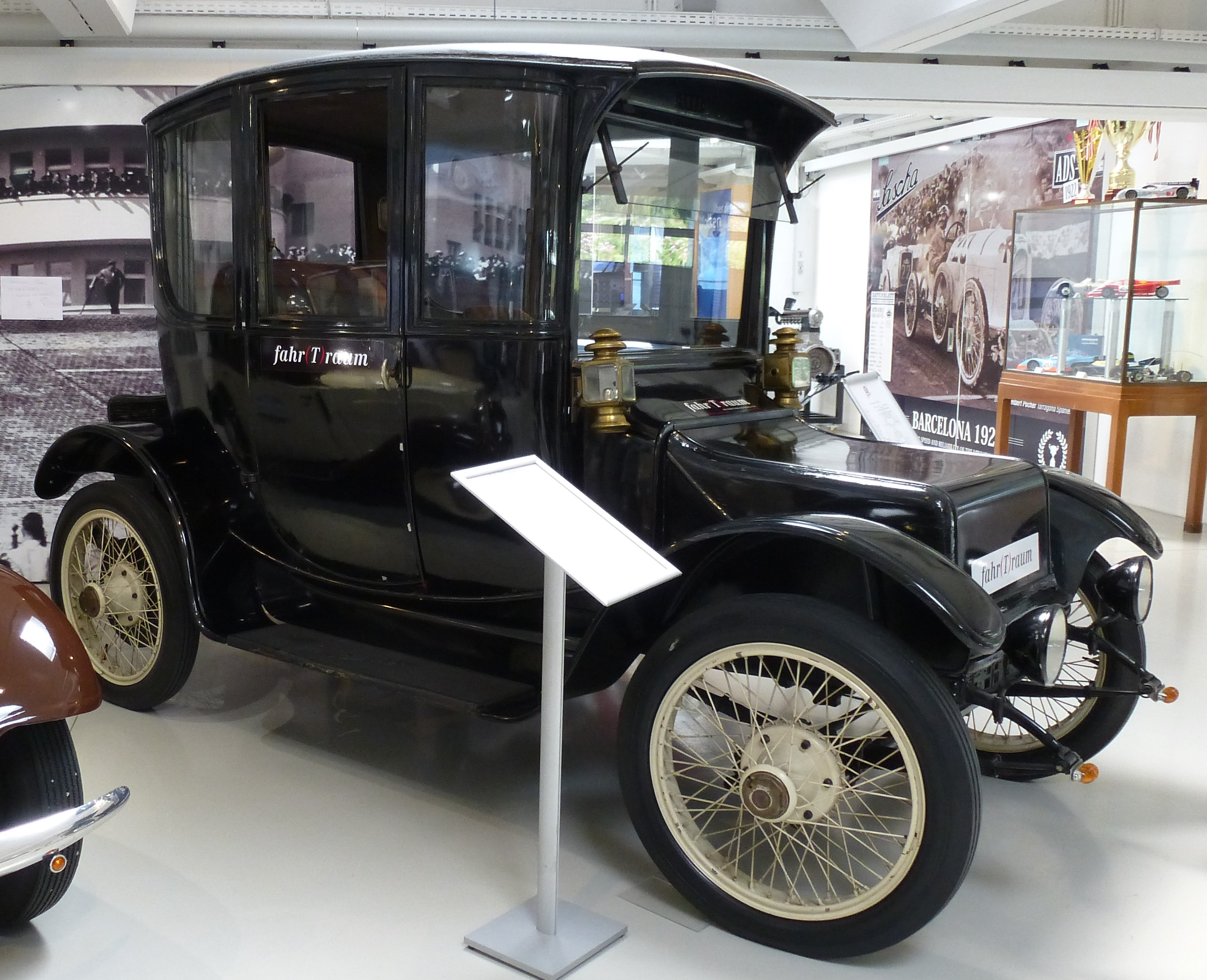
1912-1914 Rauch & Lang in a Salzburg Austria museum

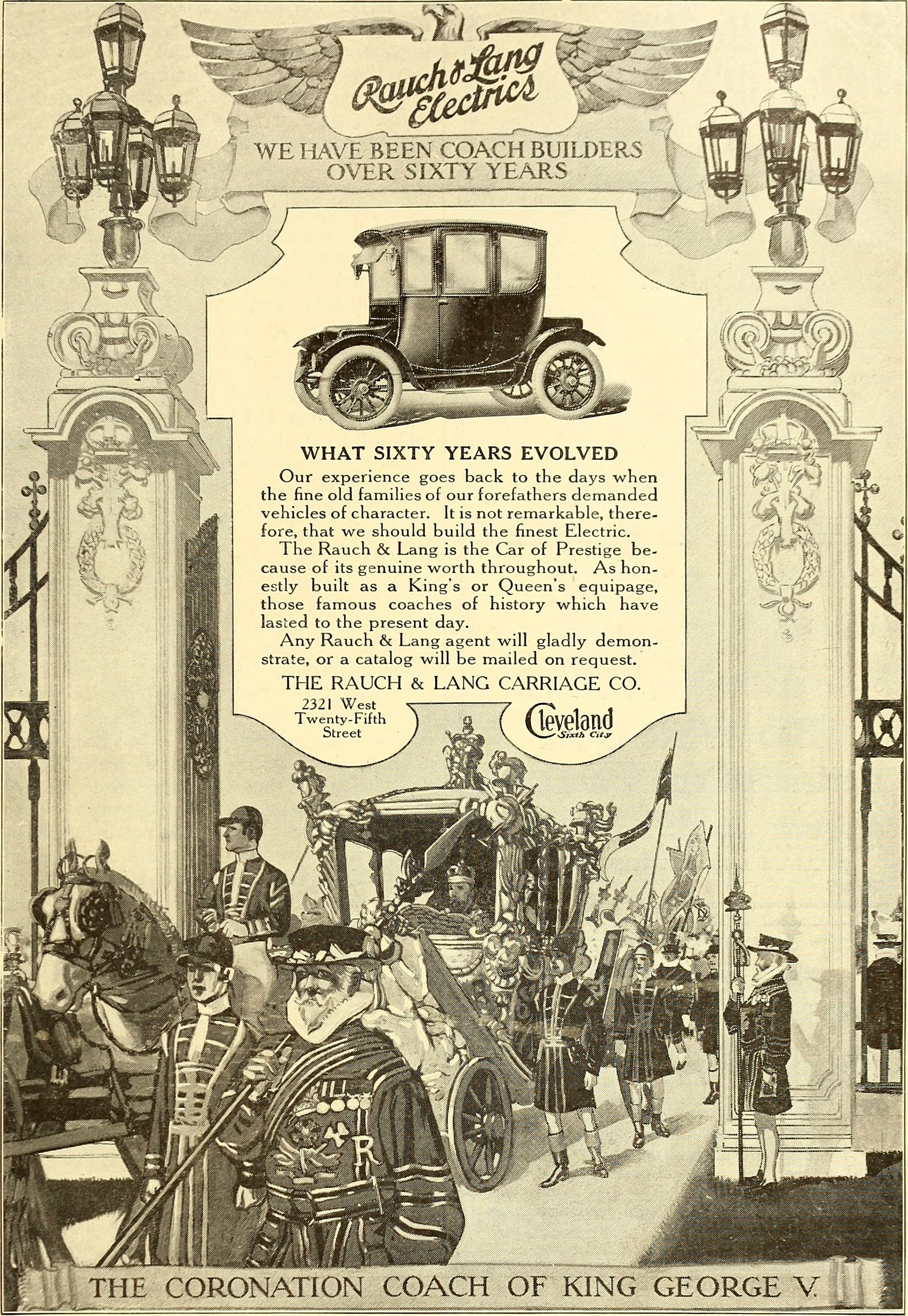
Rauch & Lang advertisement - American Homes & Gardens magazine May, 1913

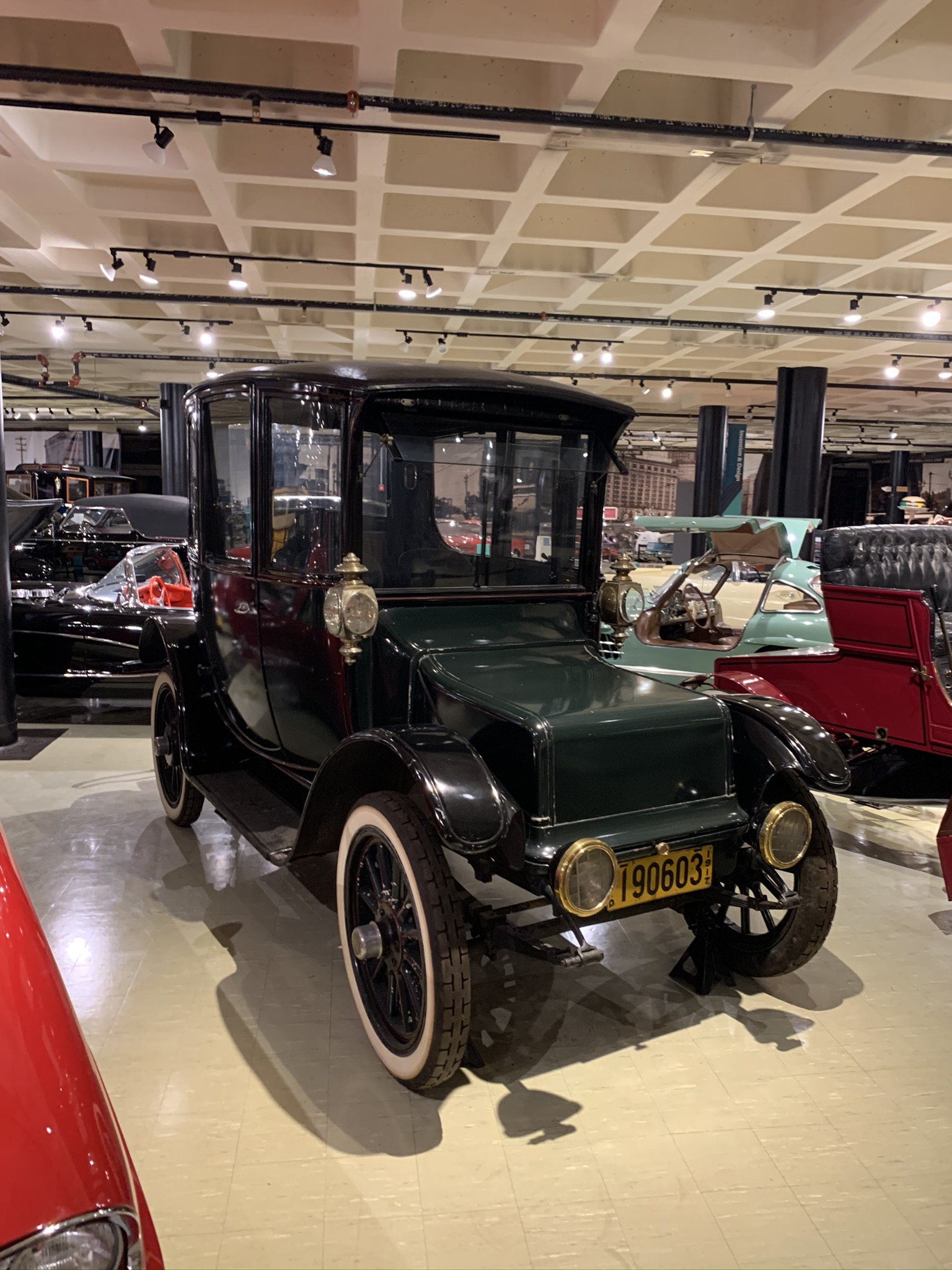
1916 Rauch & Lang at Crawford Auto-Aviation Museum

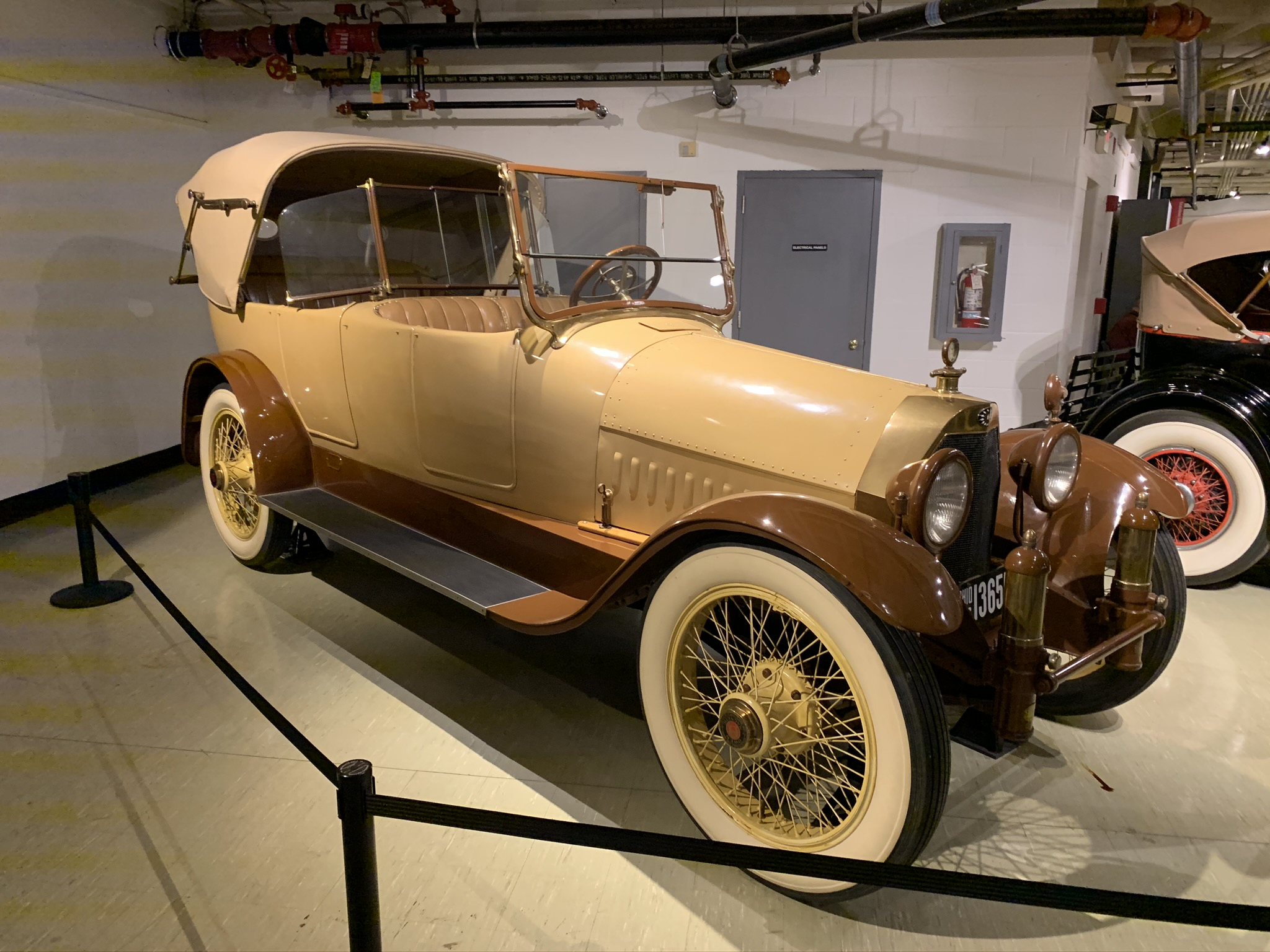
1916 Owen Magnetic, coachwork and assembled by Baker R & L Co.

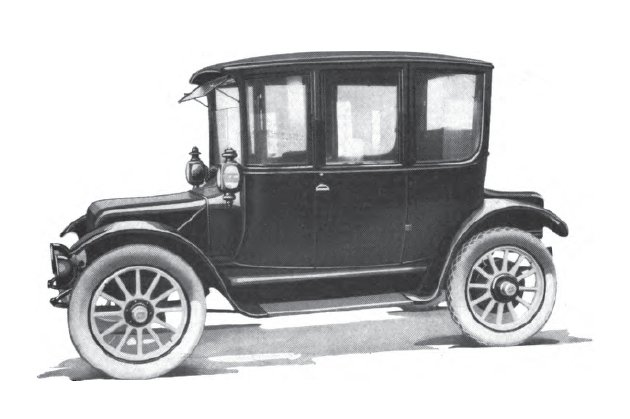
1922 Rauch & Lang Electric

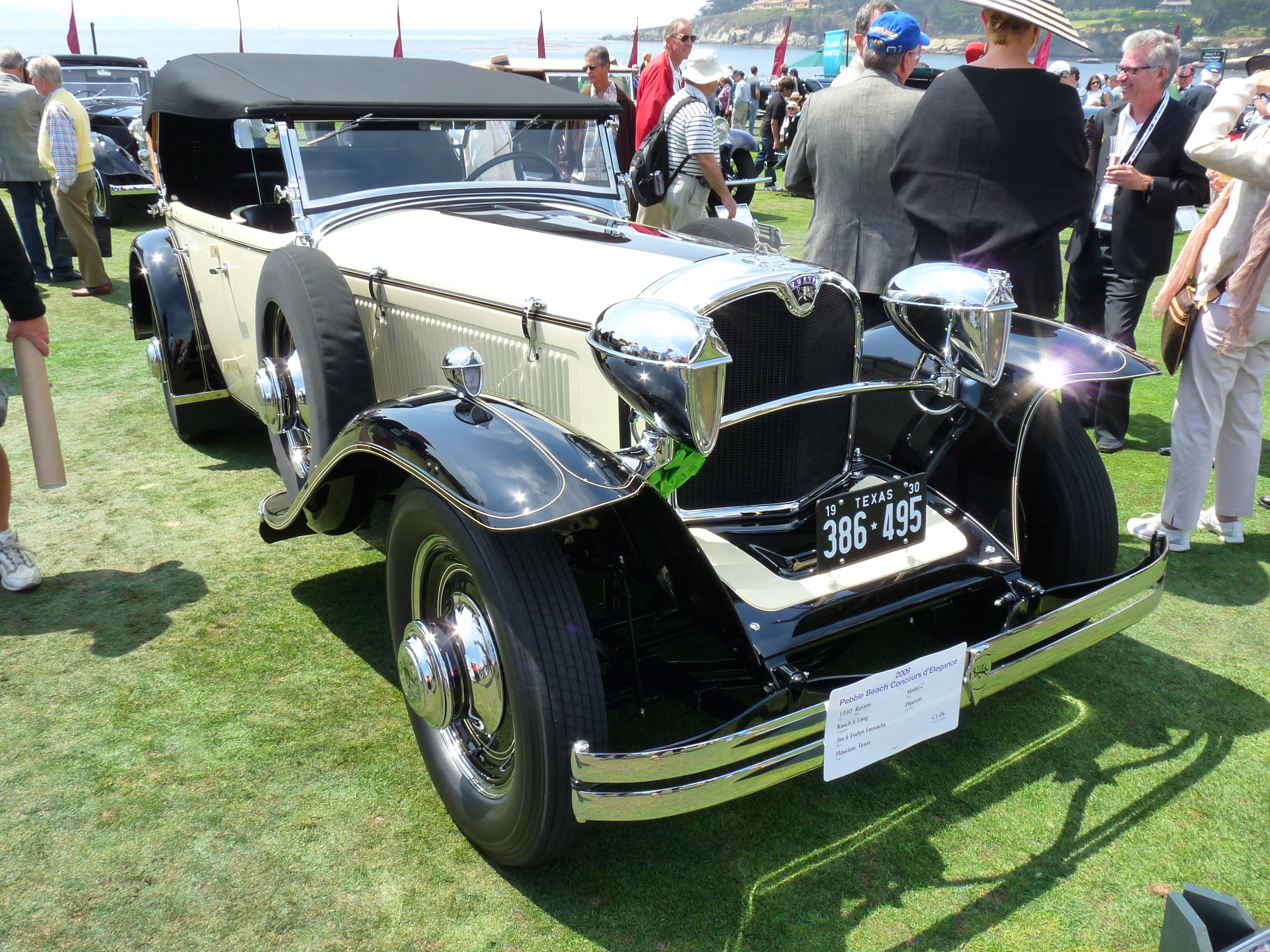
1930 Rauch & Lang coachwork - Ruxton Phaeton

== See also ==
- List of defunct United States automobile manufacturers
- History of the electric vehicle

=== Other early electric vehicles ===
- American Electric
- Argo Electric
- Babcock Electric Carriage Company
- Baker Electric
- Berwick
- Binghamton Electric
- Buffalo Electric
- Century
- Columbia Automobile Company
- Dayton Electric
- Detroit Electric
- Grinnell
- Menominee
- Riker Electric
- Woods Motor Vehicle
