= Binghamton Electric =

American motor vehicle manufacturer

The Binghamton Electric was an American automobile manufactured only in 1920. An electric car from Binghamton, New York, the car was made probably as a prototype, by the Binghamton Electric Truck Co., located at 250, Main street. Not more than two or three two-passenger coupes were produced. The company built a small number of electric trucks in 1920–1921.

== See also ==
- List of defunct United States automobile manufacturers
- History of the electric vehicle

=== Other Early Electric Vehicles ===
- American Electric
- Argo Electric
- Babcock Electric Carriage Company
- Berwick
- Buffalo Electric
- Century
- Columbia Automobile Company
- Dayton Electric
- Detroit Electric
- Grinnell
- Menominee
- Rauch and Lang
- Riker Electric
