= Baker Motor Vehicle =

Defunct American motor vehicle manufacturer

Baker Motor Vehicle Company
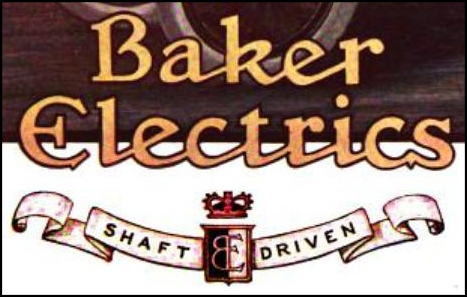
- Industry: Automotive
- Genre: Electric automobiles
- Founded: 1899
- Defunct: 1914
- Fate: Merged with Cleveland, Ohio automaker Rauch and Lang
- Successor: Baker, Rauch & Lang
- Headquarters: Cleveland, OH, United States
- Number of locations: 1250 West 80th St.
- Products: Vehicles; Automotive parts

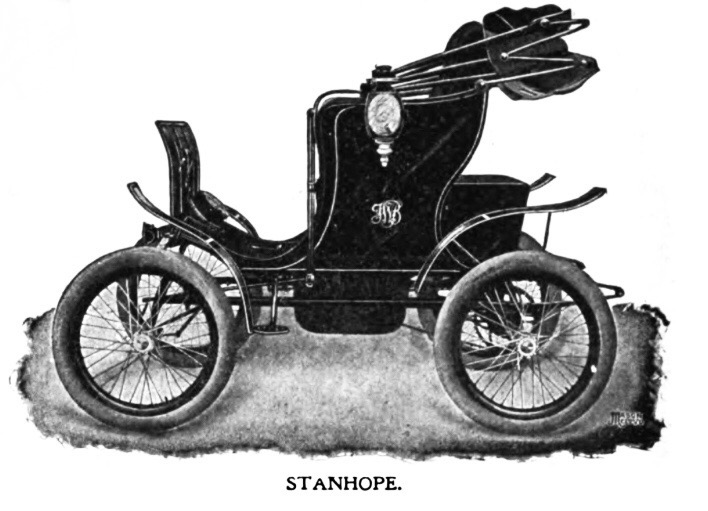
Baker Stanhope (1902)

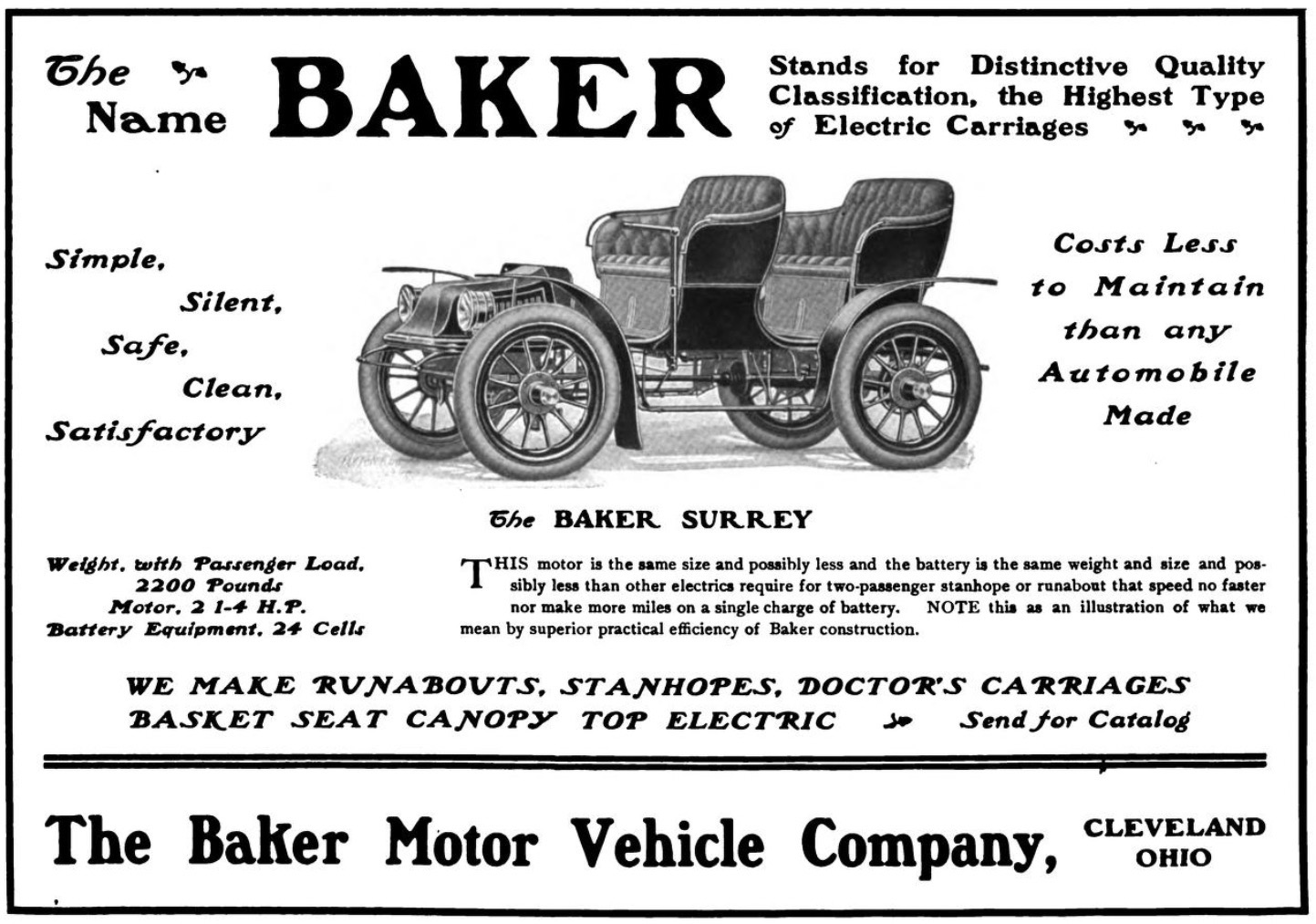
Baker Surrey (1904)

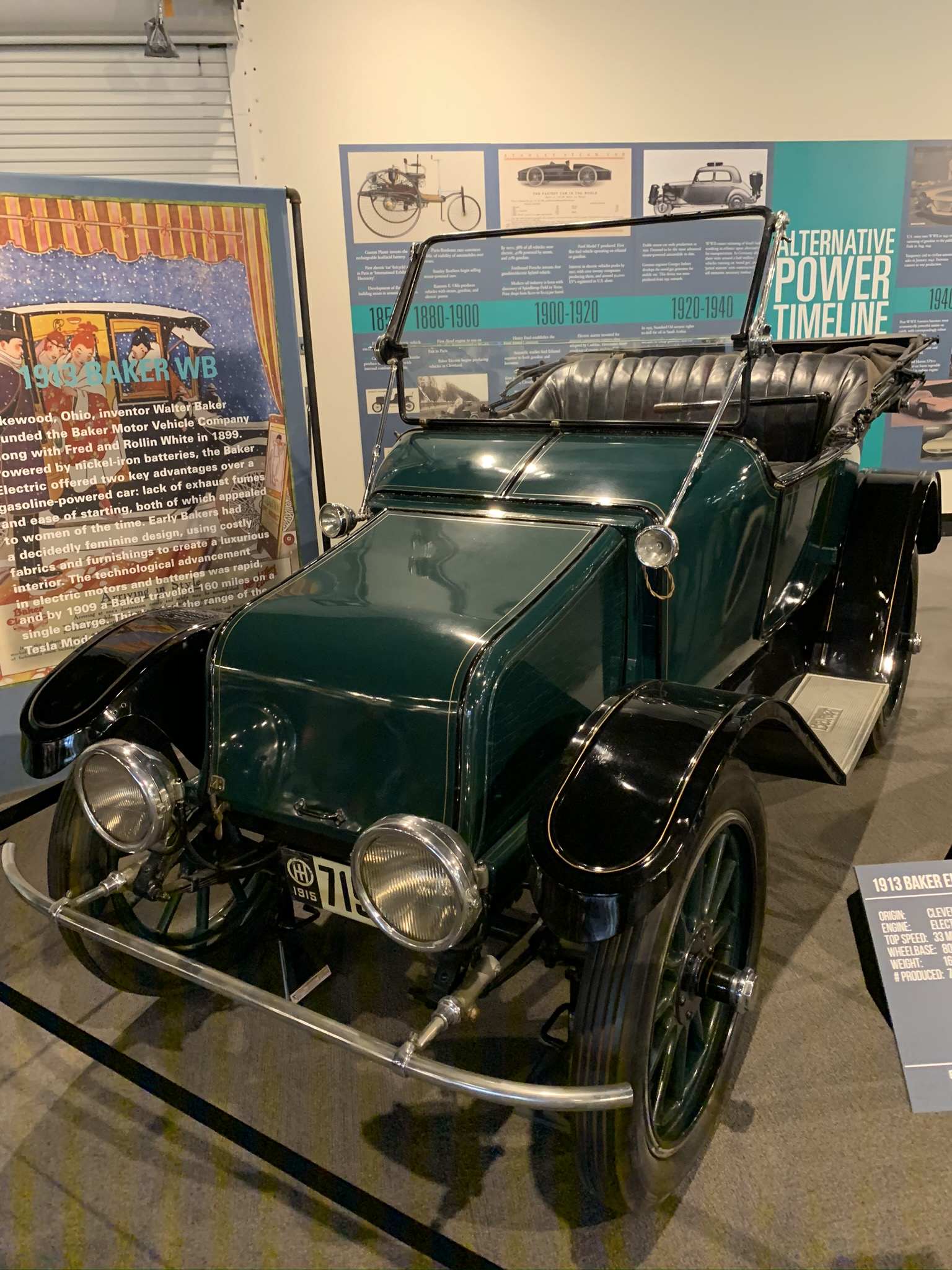
1913 Baker Electric

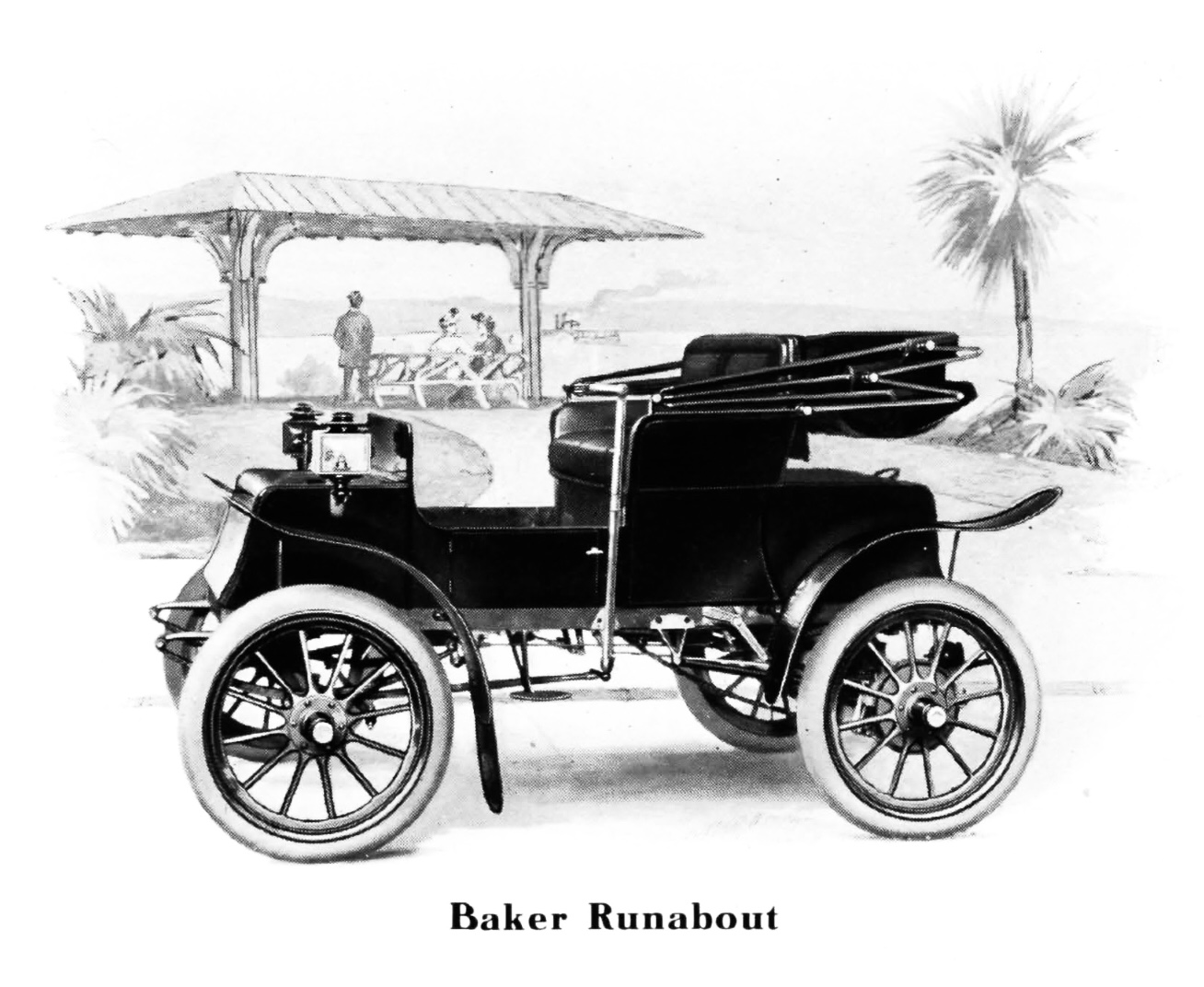
Baker Runabout 1.5 kW (1907)

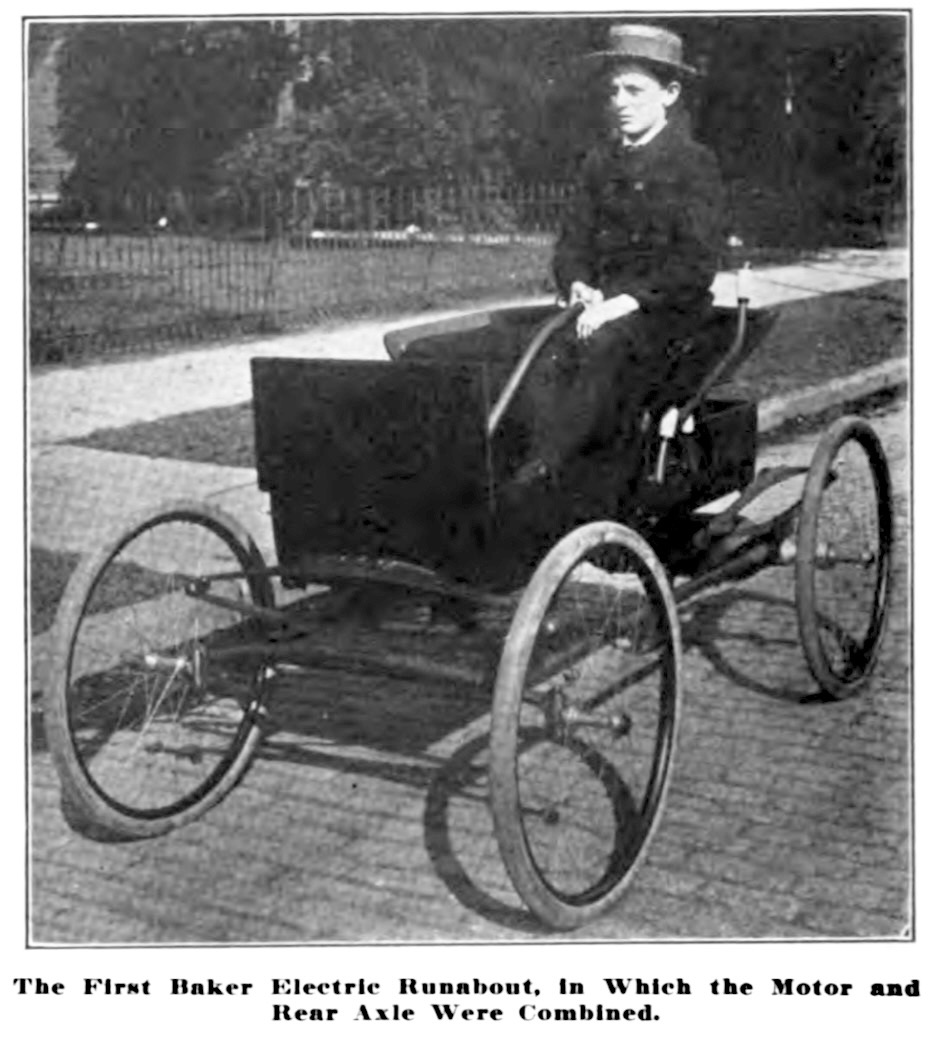
Baker Runabout

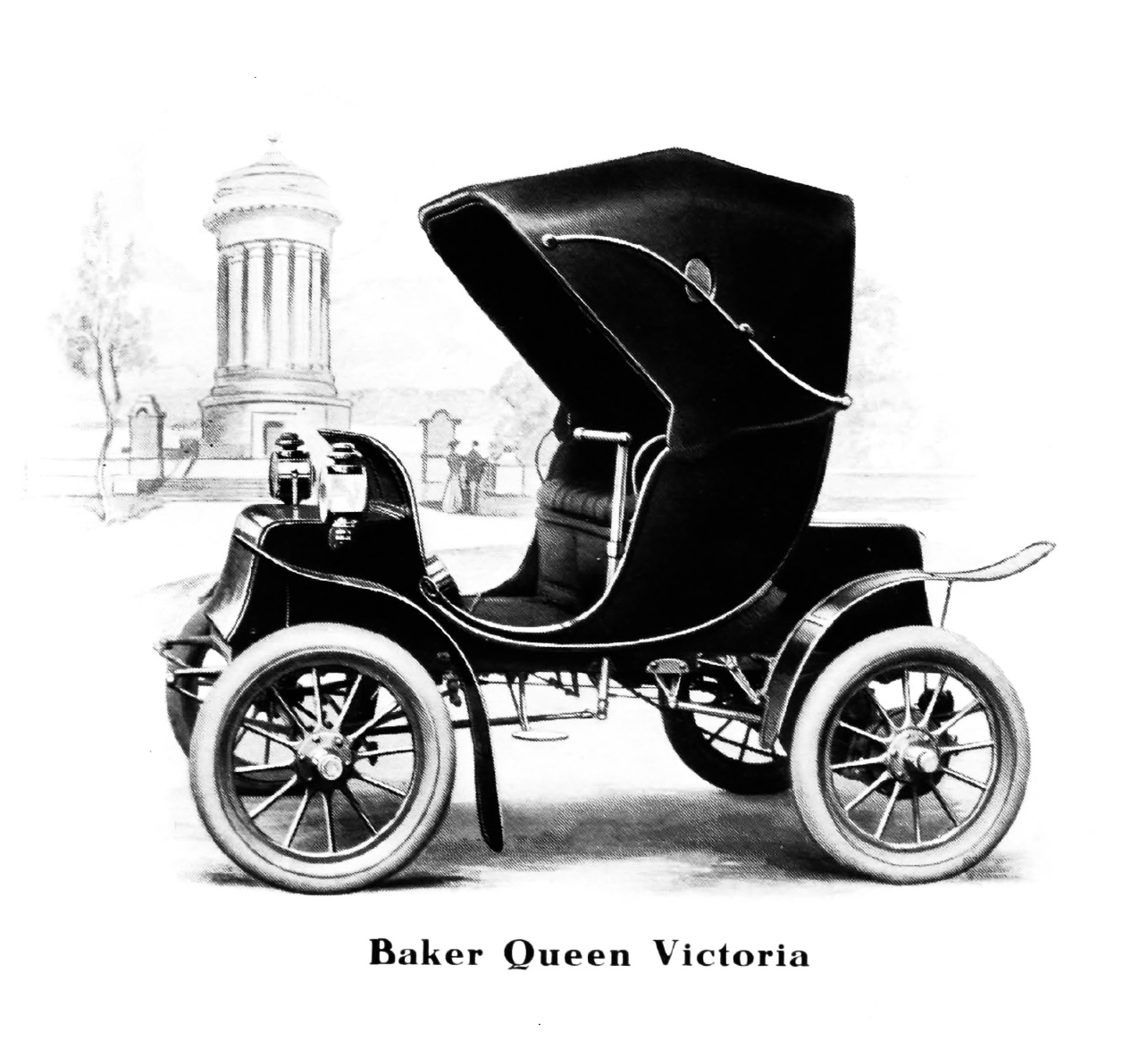
Baker Queen Victoria 1.5 kW (1907)

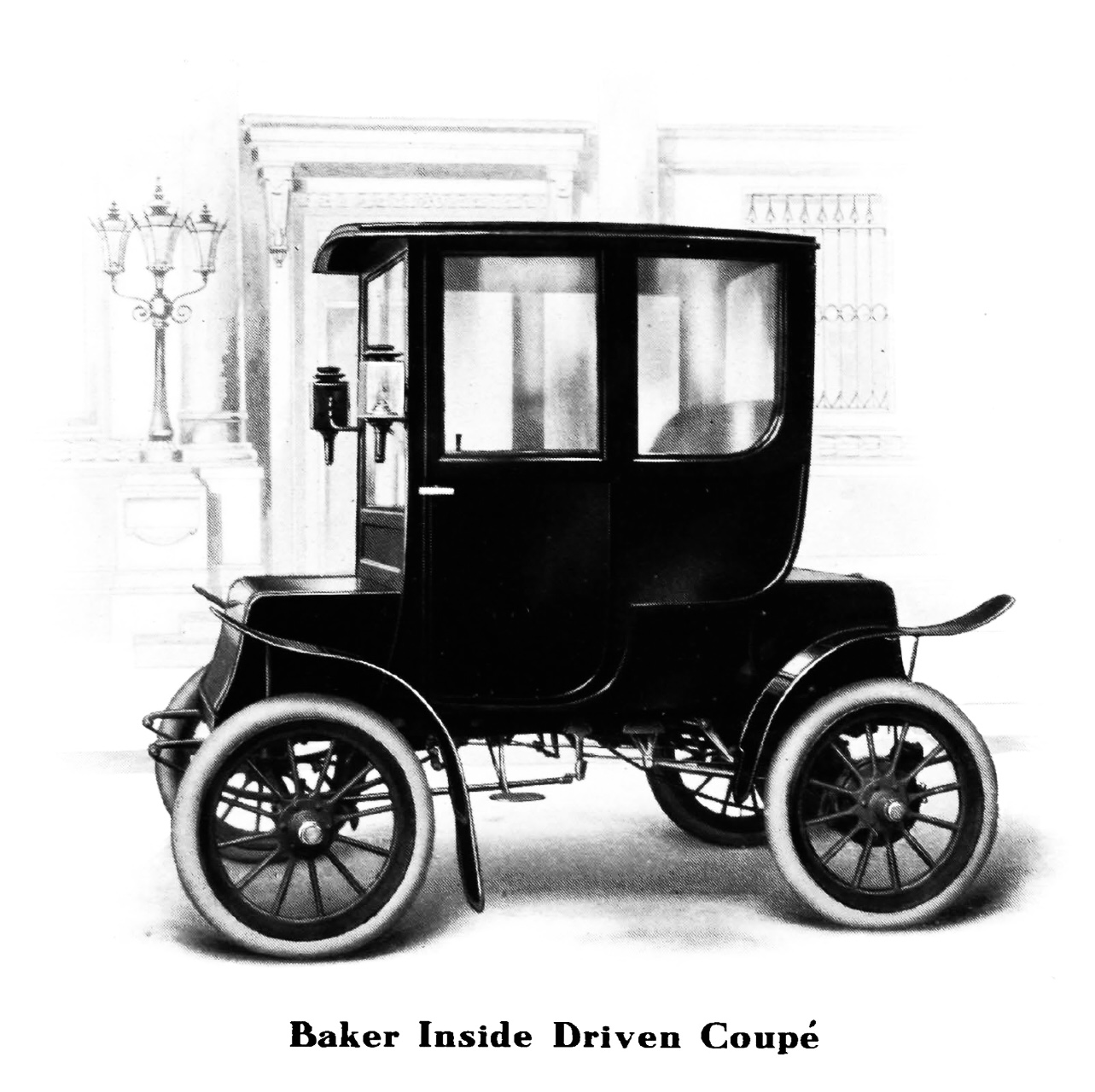
Baker Inside Driven Coupé 1.5 kW (1907)

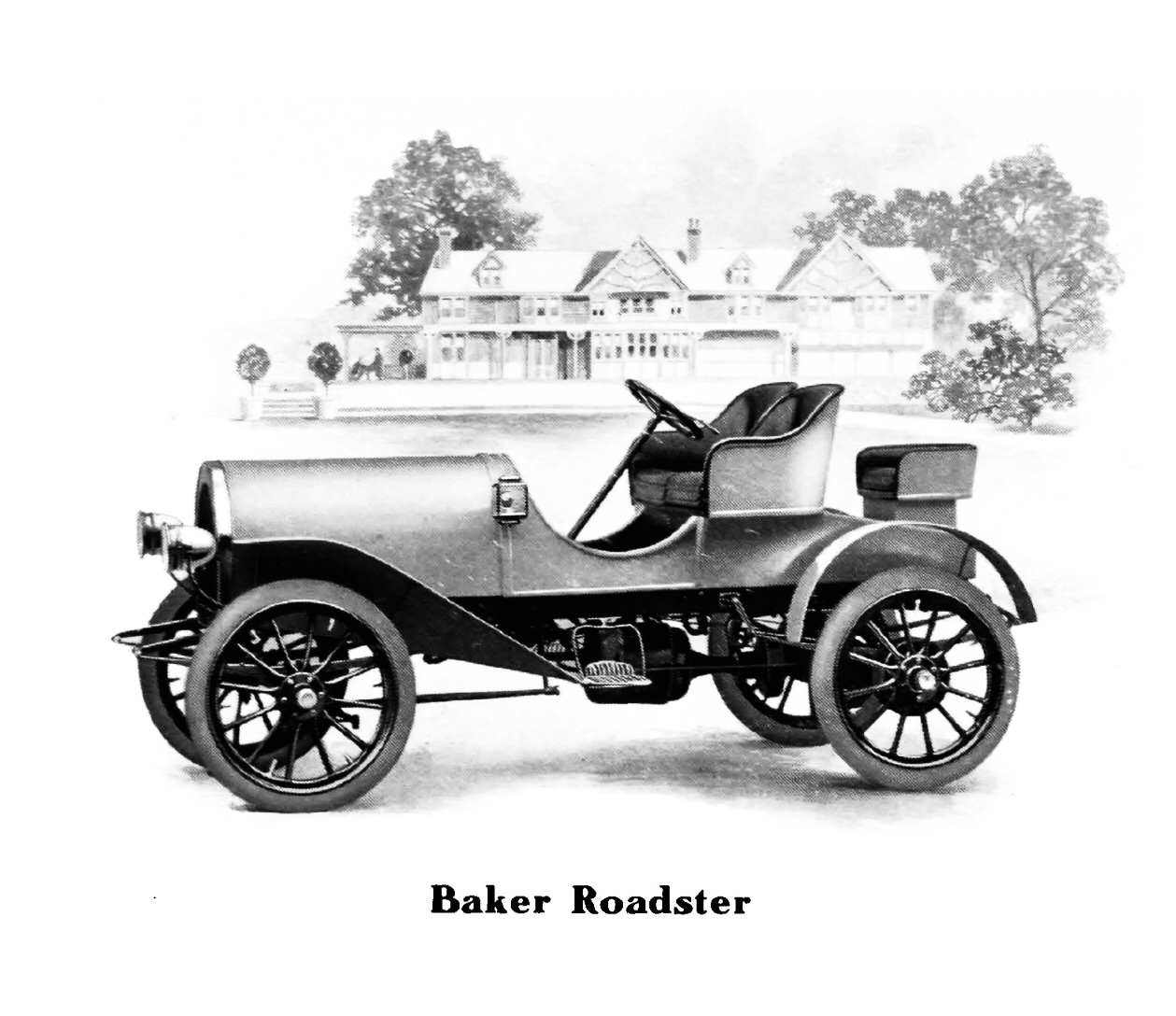
Baker Roadster 2.6 kW (1907)

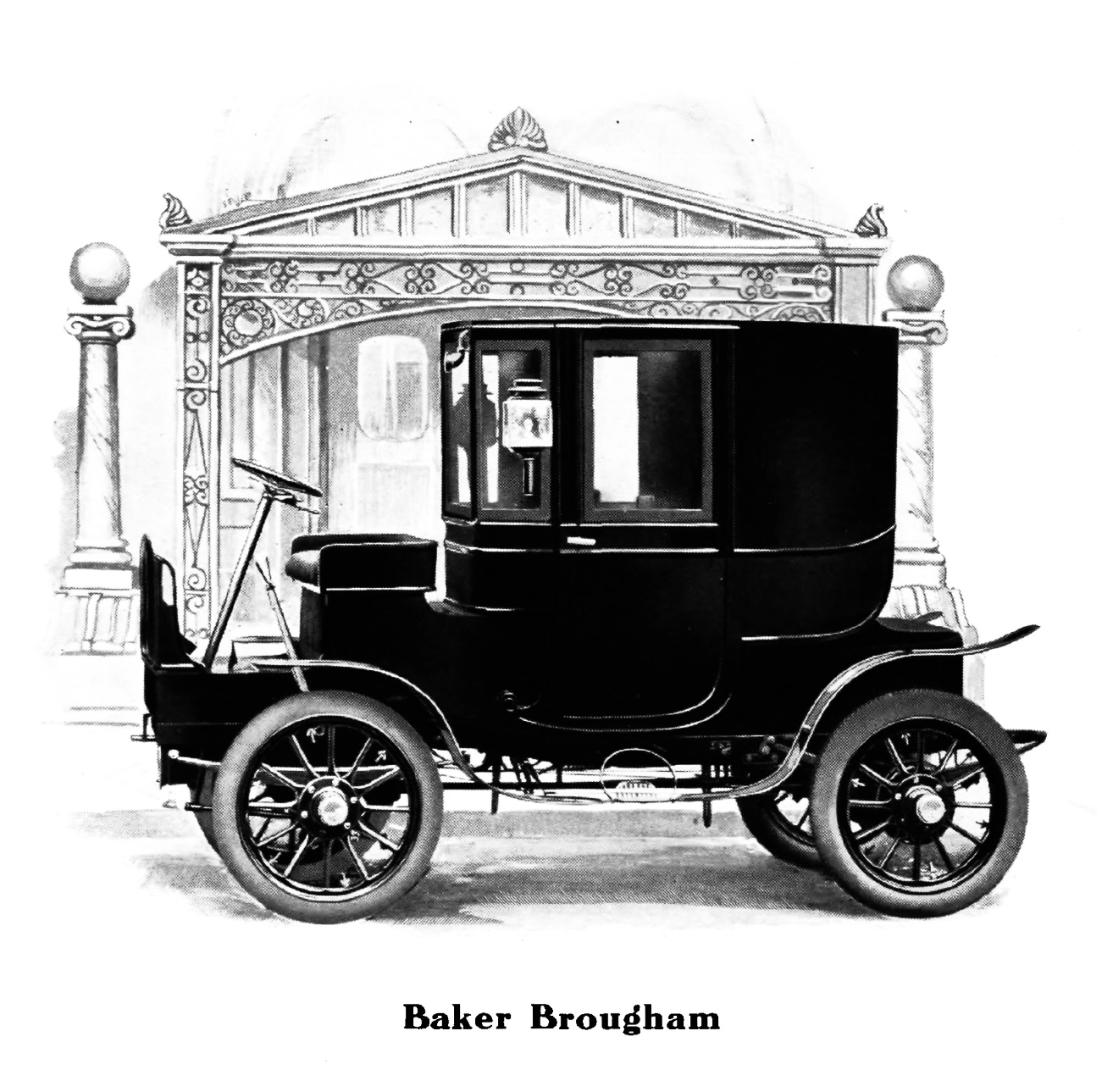
Baker Brougham 4.3 kW (1907)

Baker Motor Vehicle Company was an American manufacturer of Brass Era electric automobiles in Cleveland, Ohio, from 1899 to 1914. It was founded by Walter C. Baker.

== History ==
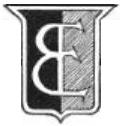
Baker Electrics logo, 1912

The Baker Electric cars spun off the American Ball Bearing Company in 1898 to demonstrate their axles and bearings. The first Baker vehicle was a two seater with a selling price of US$850. One was sold to Thomas Edison as his first car. Edison also designed the nickel-iron batteries used in some later Baker electrics. These batteries have extremely long lives.

=== 1902 accident ===
In May 1902, Baker took part in a speed trial on a public road on Staten Island, New York. The vehicle was built specially for racing, having previously raced in Cleveland, and was a streamlined and enclosed 'torpedo' body with a small leather hood having an isinglass window giving the driver a very limited view. A crew of two were carried, one acting as brakesman whilst W C Baker, the driver, steered. Although carrying two people increased the weight, this was a small matter when the car already weighed 3,000 lb (1,400 kg), with a full battery set. The car was lightened by racing with one had the usual battery. The intention was to exceed 60 mph and to cover 'a mile a minute' from a standing start, beating the performance of the more powerful gasoline cars and the 1901 electric record by a Riker of 1:08. The Torpedo recorded an average of 63.62 mph for the kilometer, and was gaining speed just before the crash.

The Baker was car 39 from the start and set a good time for the first part of the course, but then lost control and slid sideways into the crowd. Two spectators were killed and others injured. In the aftermath, the Automobile Club of America resolved to stop races on public roads and there was a general loss of confidence in the safety of electric cars.

=== Early production ===
The model range was expanded in 1902 to four models, with armored wood-frames, centrally located electric motors, and a 12-cell battery.

The Runabout had 0.75 horsepower (0.56 kW), weighed 650 pounds (290 kg), and had a wheelbase of 58-in. The Stanhope cost US$1,600, weighed 950 pounds (430 kg), had 1.75 horsepower (1.30 kW) and three-speeds forward. It was capable of 14 miles per hour (23 km/h).

In 1906, Baker made 800 cars, making them the largest electric vehicle maker in the world at the time. They bragged that their new Edgewater Park factory was "the largest in the world" in advertisements. According to the company promotionals; "We employ the choicest materials in every detail of their construction and finish, producing vehicles which in every minute particular, cannot be equaled for thorough excellence."

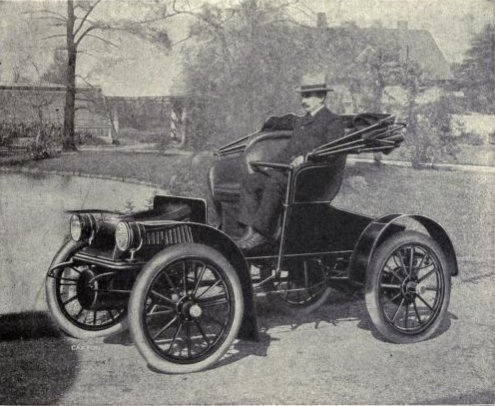
1909 Baker Suburban Runabout

The 1906 Baker Landolet was priced at $4,000. The company also manufactured the Imperial, Stanhope, Suburban, Surrey, Depot Carriages, and other new models "to be announced later." One of the most unusual 1906 Bakers was the Brougham with the driver on the outside, in the back.

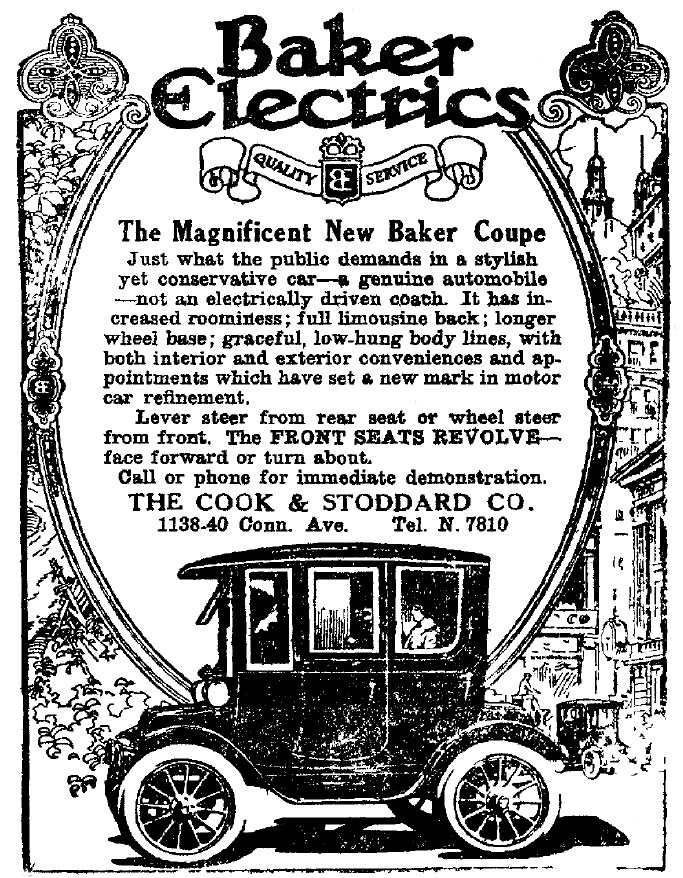
Baker Electrics advertisement, The Washington Post, 19 October 1913

By 1907, Baker had seventeen models, the smallest being the Stanhope and the largest the Inside Drive Coupe. There was also the US$4,000 Extension Front Brougham with the driving seat high up behind the passengers like a hansom cab. Baker also introduced a range of trucks with capacity of up to five tons.

In 1910, Baker introduced their new shaft-drive cars with the new GE high speed motor.. The Broughams were quite luxurious and priced from $2,250-$2,600. It had a seating capacity of four passengers and were painted with black chassis and a with choice of blue, green or maroon body panels. The latest model also offered a Queen Victoria body as "interchangeable on chassis" priced at an additional $300.

=== Special Baker Electrics ===
- A Baker Electric was part of the first White House fleet of cars. It was driven by Helen Taft, wife of William Howard Taft, and later by Edith Bolling Wilson.
- A Baker Electric was bought in 1903 by King Chulalongkorn of Siam. It was trimmed with ivory and gold, and upholstered with pigskin seats.
- Jay Leno owns a restored 1909 Baker Electric.

=== Commercial vehicles ===
Baker Motor-Vehicle Co. Commercial Car Department, 1912

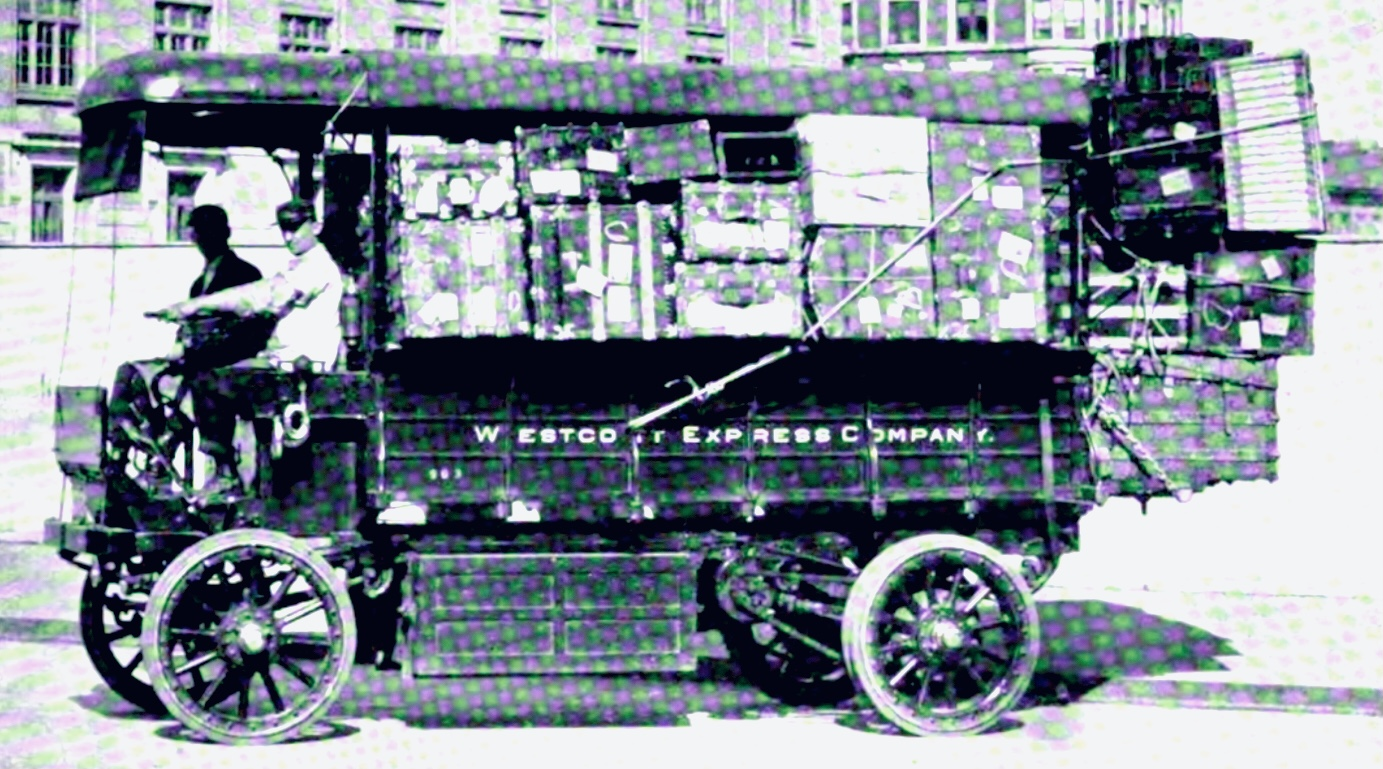
Baker Electric Truck (1914)

The Baker Motor-Vehicle Company, located at 63 West 80th Street in Cleveland, Ohio, specialized in vehicles for the commercial market. By October 1912, the company had a Commercial Car Department and had dealers situated in several leading cities around the United States.

During late 1912, Baker advertised that the average cost for deliveries over the "steep hills" of Spokane, Washington, by Crescent Department Store were four cents a piece, including all operating charges, maintenance, interest and depreciation.

By late 1913, the company advertised their new model as "The magnificent new Baker Coupe" and that the car was "just what the public demanded, a genuine automobile, not an electrically driven coach". That year, the car had "increased roominess, full limousine back, longer wheelbase, graceful, low-hung body lines, with both interior and exterior conveniences and appointments which have set a new mark in motor car refinement". Another new feature were revolving front seats which faced forward or "turn about".

Commercial vehicles:

- Model X - 0,5 t Truck
- Model O - 1 t Truck
- Model U - 2 t Truck
- Model CC - 3,5 t Truck

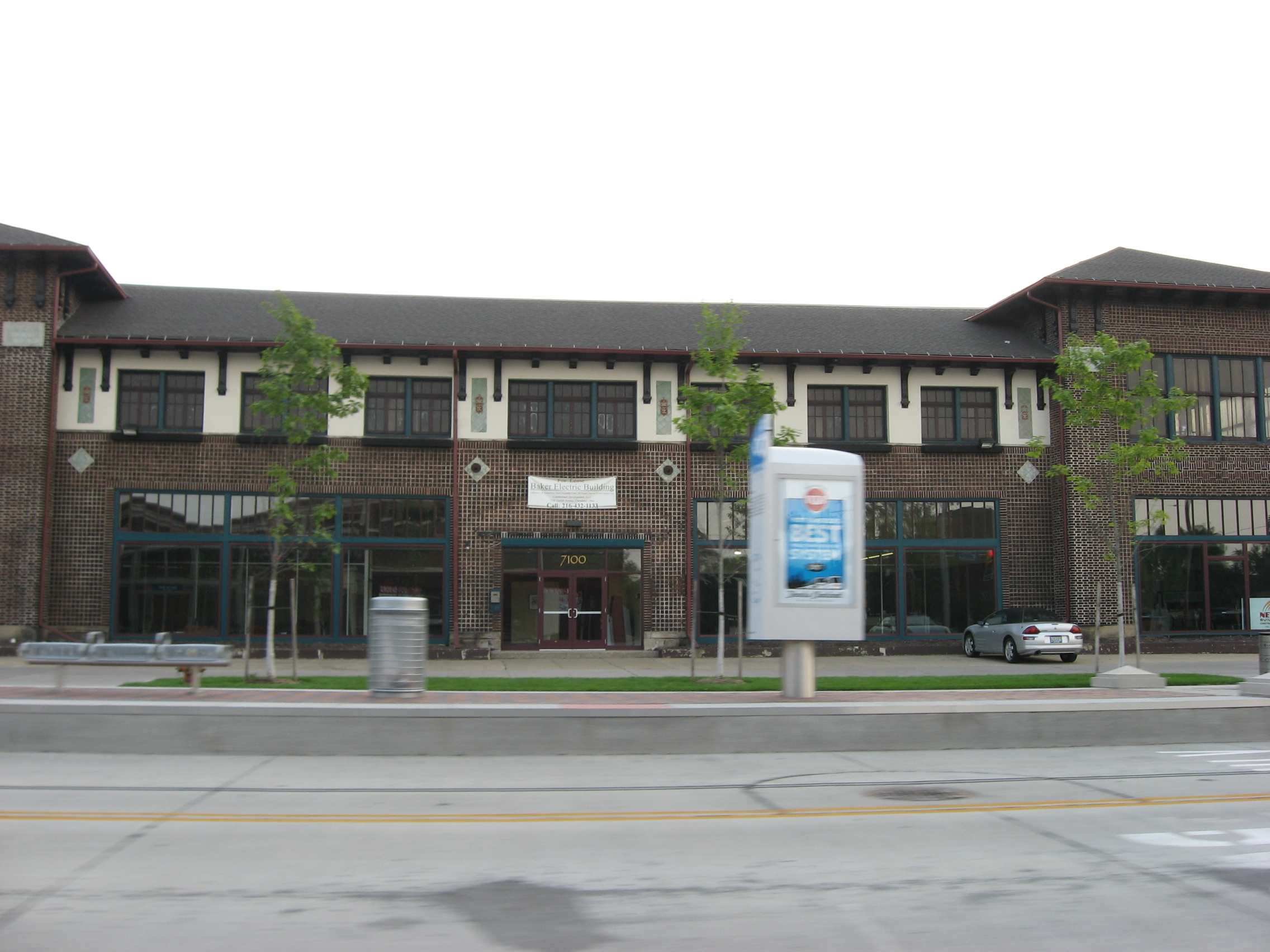
Baker's former showroom and service facility on Euclid Avenue

=== Merger ===
Baker Electric - Quality Service in 1913

Around 1913, Baker was overtaken in sales by Detroit Electric and, in 1915, merged with fellow Cleveland automaker Rauch and Lang to become Baker, Rauch & Lang. The last Baker branded cars were made in 1916, but the electric industrial trucks continued for much longer. Baker, Rauch & Lang also produced the Owen Magnetic 1915-1920.

Founder Walter C. Baker's Torpedo land speed record racer was the first car to have seat belts. The car was capable of over 75 miles per hour (120 km/h).

Walter Baker joined the board of Peerless Motor Company in 1919.

== Advertisements ==
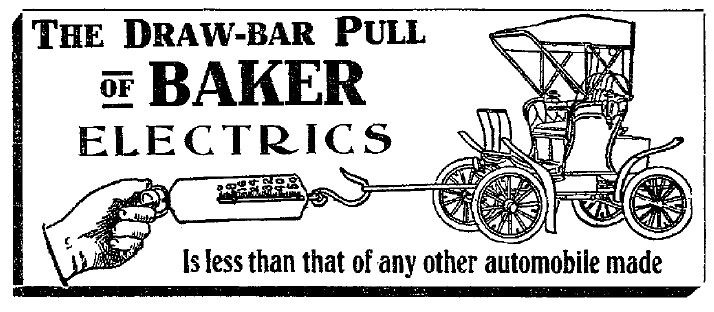
A 1906 Baker Electrics Advertisement - The Draw-Bar Pull of Baker Electrics - The Washington Post, June 17, 1906

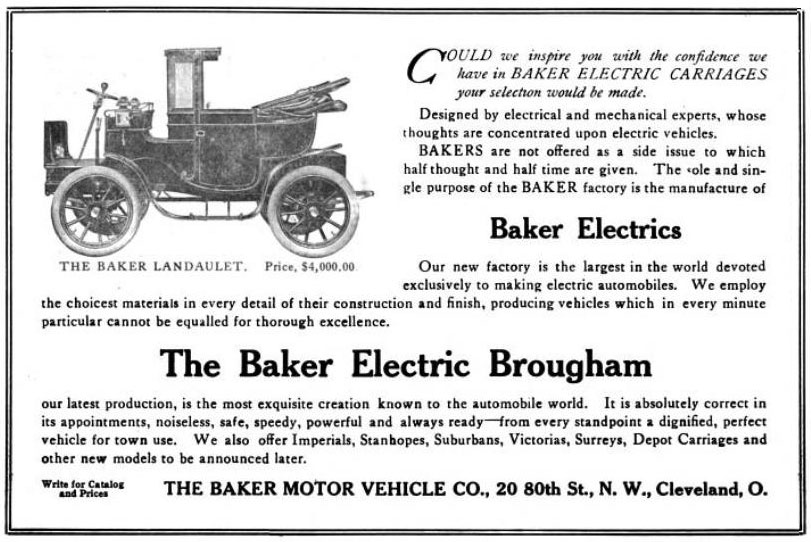
Baker Motor Vehicle Company advertisement - Automotive Industries, 1906

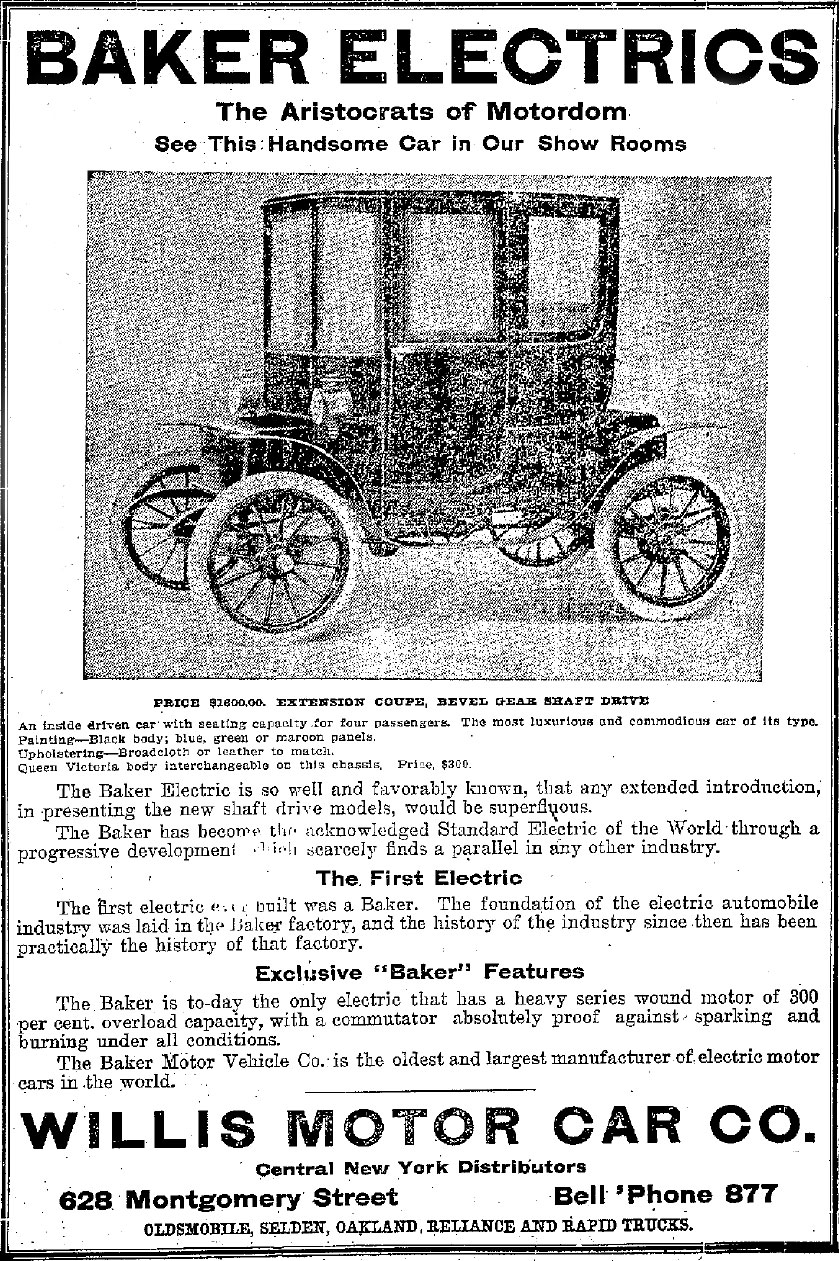
Baker Electrics - 1910 Advertisement - Syracuse Journal, December 3, 1910

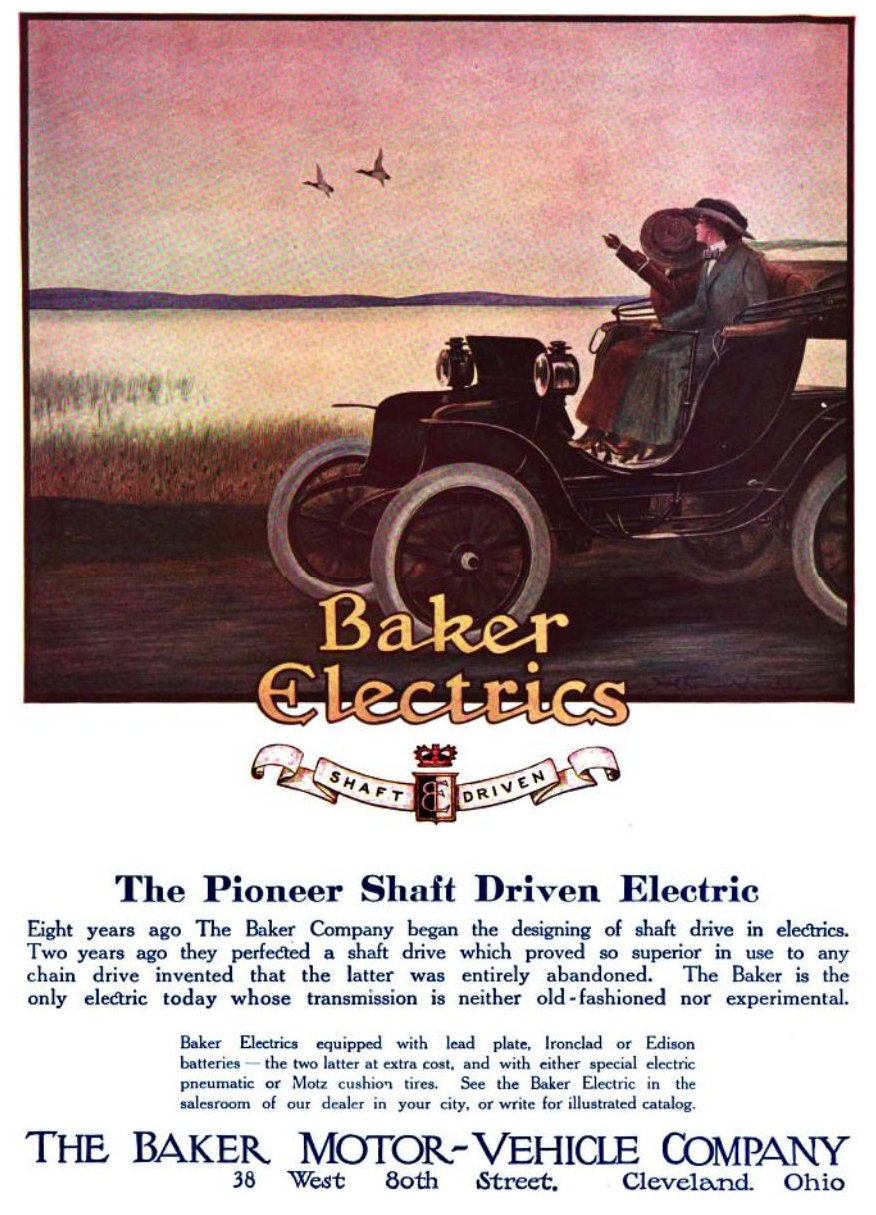
Baker Electric - 1911 Advertisement - Country Life in America, May 15, 1911

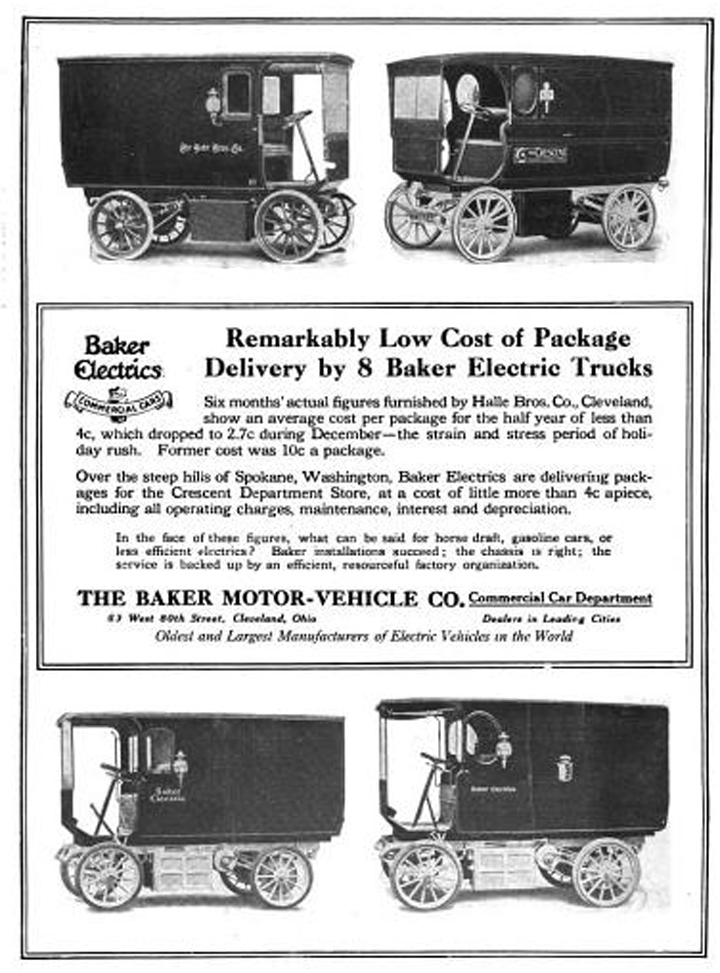
Advertisement 1912 - Baker Motor-Vehicles Co. of Cleveland, Ohio - Commercial Car Department - Power Trucks, 1912

== In popular culture ==
A 1916 Baker Electric featured in a 1959 episode of Peter Gunn entitled "Love Me to Death". A 1916 Baker Electric was also featured in a 1960 episode of Dennis the Menace.

== See also ==
- List of automobile manufacturers
- List of car brands
- History of the electric vehicle
- Search for the Super Battery (2017 PBS film)
