= Grinnell (automobile) =

Defunct American motor vehicle manufacturer

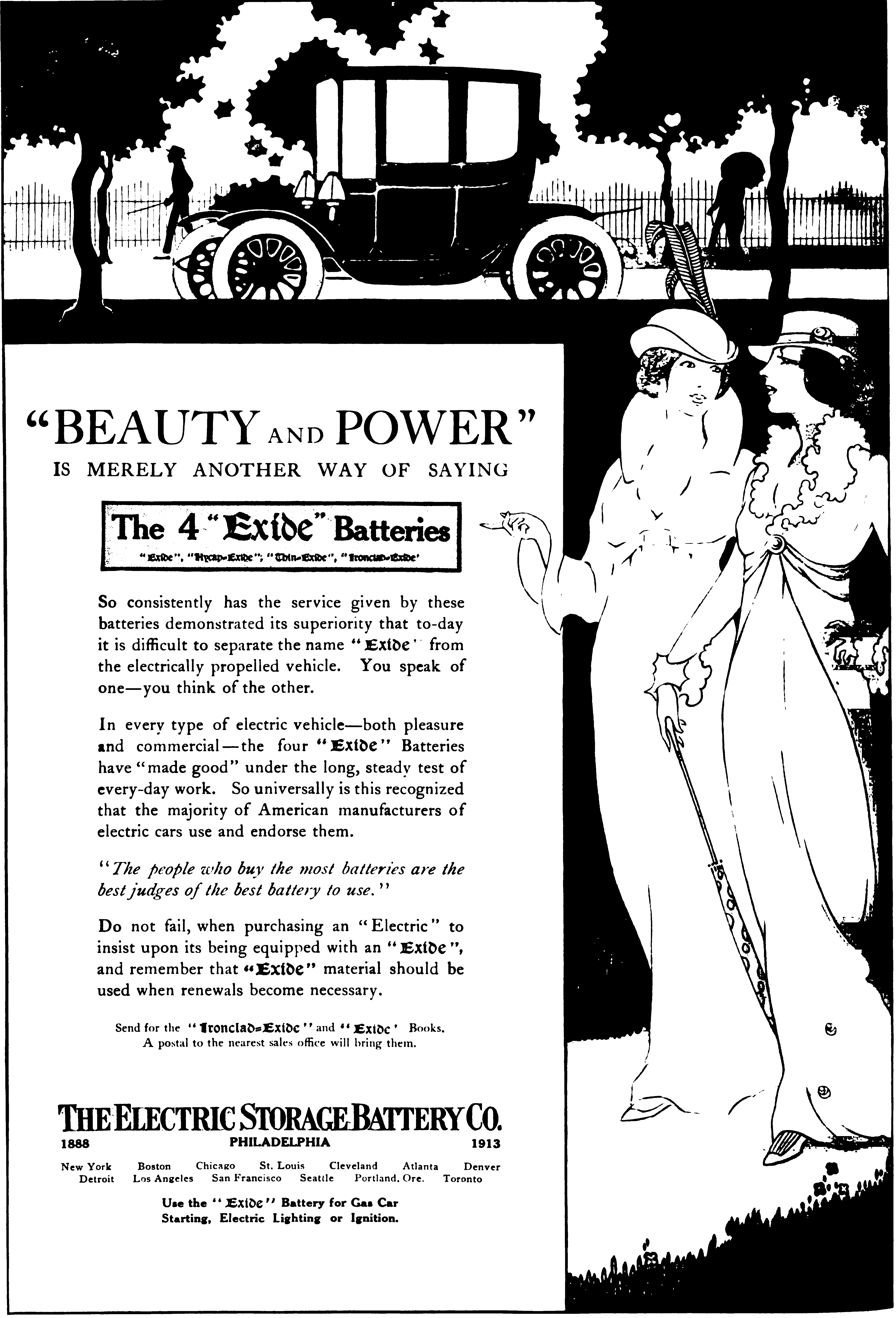
A Grinnell featured in an advertisement for Exide batteries.

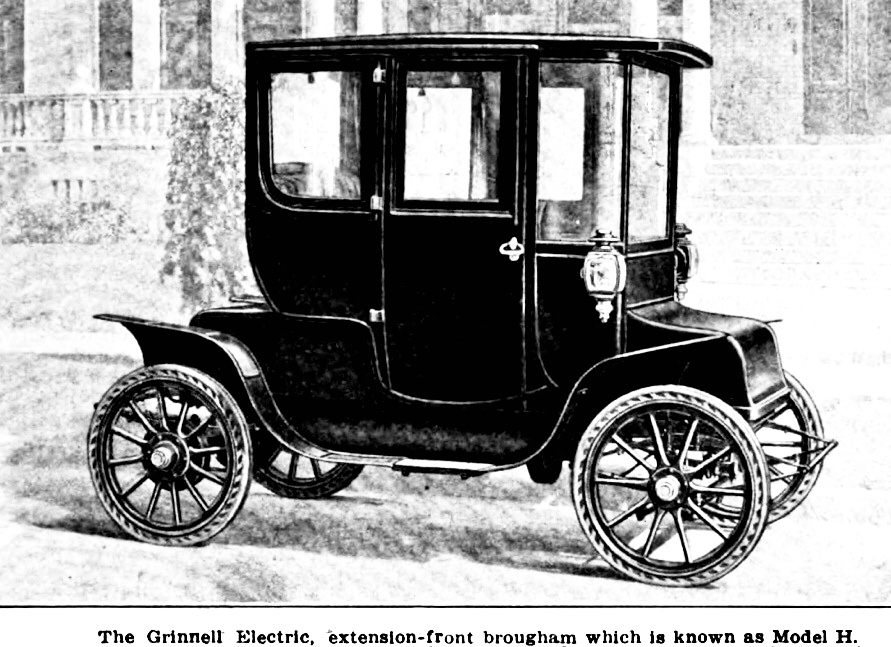
Grinell Model H (1912)

The Grinnell was an American electric car manufactured in Detroit, Michigan by the Grinnell Electric Car Company from 1910 to 1913. The Grinnell was a five-seater closed coupe that sat on a 8 ft (2.4 m) wheelbase. The company claimed to have a 90-mile (140 km) range per charge. The vehicle cost $2,800 (equivalent to $96,750 in 2025). For comparison, Ford Model F of 1905 and the Enger 40 were both $2000 (equivalent to $71,667 in 2025).

== See also ==
- History of the electric vehicle
