= Century (automobile) =

1910s American motor vehicle manufacturer

The Century was an early American electric car produced by the Century Motor Company in Detroit, Michigan from 1911 to 1913. The Century had an underslung chassis, tiller-operated steering, and the option of either solid or pneumatic tires. Its electrical speed controller offered a choice of six-speeds, and the series-wound Westinghouse motor was geared directly to the rear axle.

Century Motor Company was renamed to the Century Electric Car Company from 1913 to 1915.
