= Berwick (automobile) =

Defunct American motor vehicle manufacturer

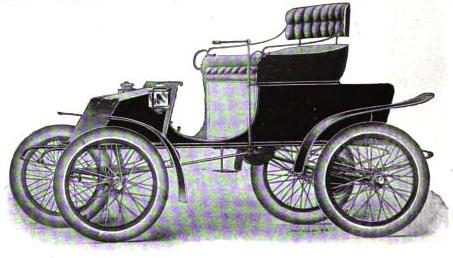
- Industry: Automotive
- Founded: 1904
- Defunct: 1904

The Berwick was an electric car manufactured in Grand Rapids, Michigan, by the Berwick Auto Car Company in 1904. The Berwick was an electric two-seater runabout selling for $750. It was frequently referred to as the Marquette. With a Willard battery the range was estimated to be "almost" 45 miles; with an Edison the range was about 60 miles. It had three speed positions, was tiller operated, and had a top speed of 15 mph (24 km/h). Weight was close to 800 pounds with a battery that was sold separate. The cars were painted black and had running gear that was red. Upholstery was available in either cloth or leather.

== See also ==
- List of defunct United States automobile manufacturers
- History of the electric vehicle
