= Detroit Electric =

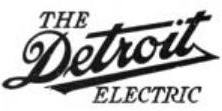

Overview
- Manufacturer: Anderson Electric Car Company
- Production: 1907–1939
- Assembly: Detroit, Michigan

Chronology
- Successor: Detroit Electric

The Detroit Electric was an electric car produced by the Anderson Electric Car Company in Detroit, Michigan. The company built 13,000 electric cars from 1907 to 1939.

The marque was revived in 2008 by Albert Lam, former Group CEO of the Lotus Engineering Group and executive director of Lotus Cars of England. to produce modern all-electric cars by Detroit Electric Holding Ltd. of the Netherlands.

== History ==
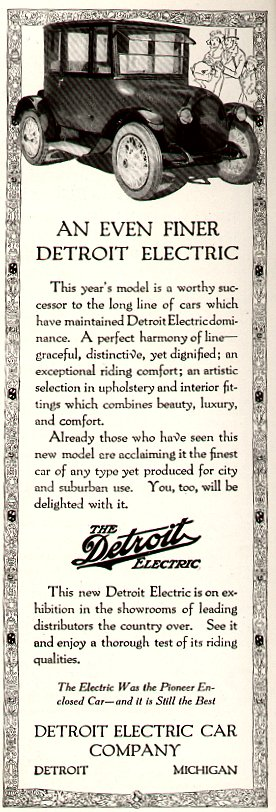
1920 advertisement

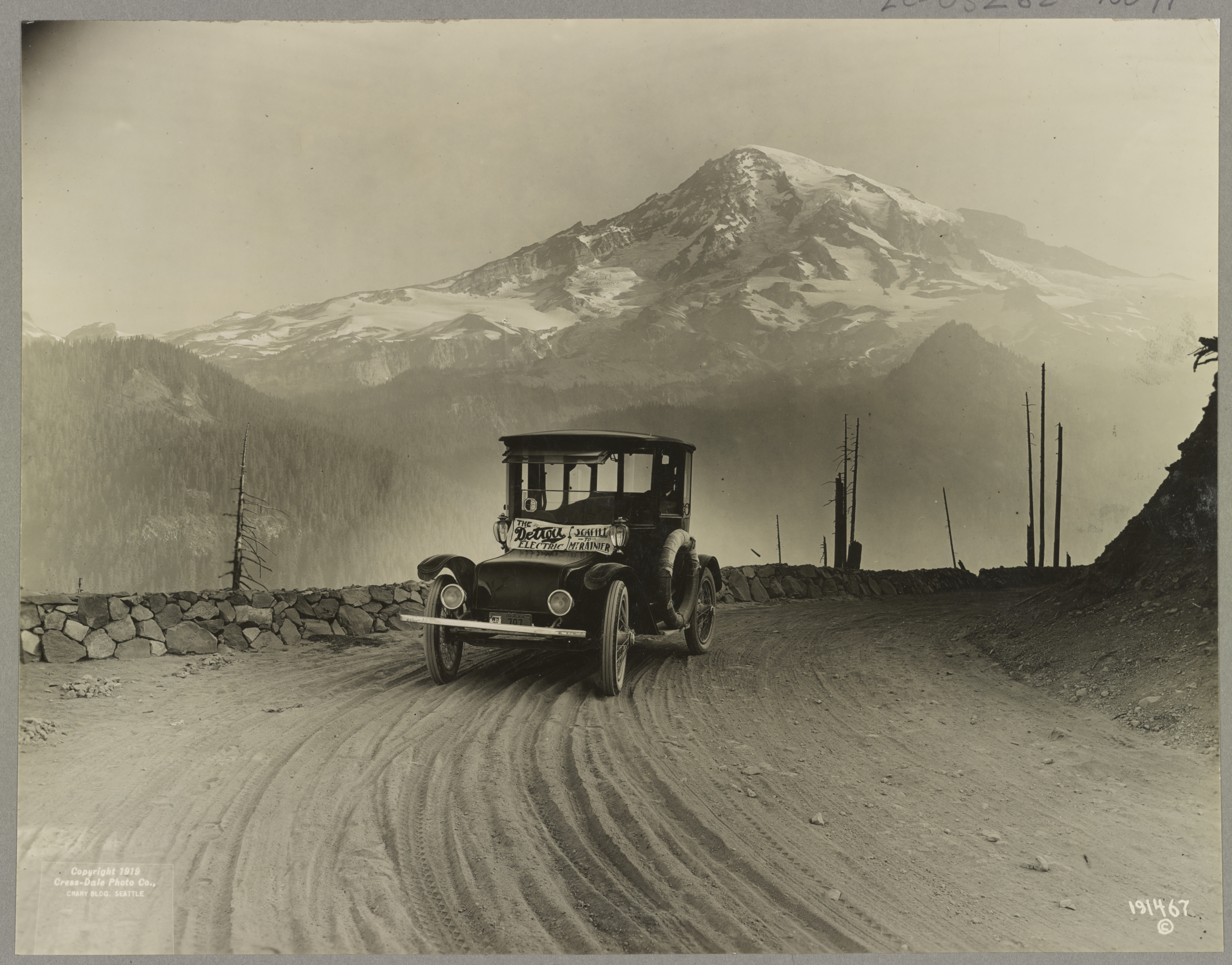
A 1919 Detroit Electric car on a promotional tour from Seattle to Mt. Rainier, with the mountain in the background.

Anderson had previously been known as the Anderson Carriage Company (until 1911), producing carriages and buggies since 1895. Production of the electric automobile, powered by a rechargeable lead acid battery, began in 1907. For an additional US$600, an Edison nickel-iron battery was available from 1911 to 1916. During this period they also made a range of trucks. The cars were advertised as reliably getting 80 miles (130 km) between battery recharging, although in one test a Detroit Electric ran 211.3 miles (340.1 km) on a single charge. Top speed was around 20 mph (32 km/h), this was normal average top speed for cars at the time of release in 1907 and was relatively slow by 1939.

The company production was at its peak in the mid-1910s selling around 1000 to 2000 cars a year. In 1920, the name of the Anderson company was changed to "The Detroit Electric Car Company" as the car maker separated from the body business (it became part of Murray Body) and the motor/controller business (Elwell-Parker). As improved internal combustion engine automobiles became more common and inexpensive, sales of the Electric dropped in the 1920s.

Alfred O. Dunk acquired the company in 1929 following the death of Anderson. Dunk went bankrupt in 1932, and the business was continued by A. F. Renz. The last Detroit Electric was shipped on February 23, 1939. In its final years the cars were manufactured only in very small numbers. Between 1907 and 1939 a total of ~13,000 electric cars were built.

Notable people who owned Detroit Electrics cars included Thomas Edison, Lizzie Borden, Charles Proteus Steinmetz, Mamie Eisenhower, and John D. Rockefeller Jr. who had a pair of Model 46 roadsters. Clara Ford, the wife of Henry Ford, drove Detroit Electrics from 1908, when Henry bought her a Model C coupe with a special child seat, through the late 1930s. Her third car was a 1914 Model 47 brougham.

Genzo Shimadzu Jr., founder of the Japanese battery company Japan Storage Battery Co. (known today as GS Yuasa), imported two Detroit Electric cars shortly after starting the company in 1917. Using his own batteries, he drove them around Tokyo to demonstrate the effectiveness of battery technology. Shimazu used them as daily drivers for 29 years until his retirement in 1946. With a return of interest in electric vehicles at the beginning of the 21st century, GS Yuasa restored one of the vehicles to running condition with a modern lithium-ion 24-volt battery in 2009, registering the date, May 20, as Electric Car Day in Japan.

Detroit Electrics can be seen in various automobile museums, such as the Forney Transportation Museum in Denver, Colorado; Belgian AutoWorld Museum in Brussels; The Henry Ford in Dearborn, Michigan; and the Museum Autovision in Altlußheim, Germany. A restored and operational Detroit Electric, owned by Union College, is located in the Edison Tech Center in Schenectady, NY. Another restored and operational 1914 with the Edison battery option (Nickel-Iron vs. Lead Acid) is located at the National Automobile Museum in Reno, Nevada. One 1914 model Is also located, restored and fully operational, near Frankenmuth, Michigan and another is at the Motor Museum of Western Australia in Perth, Australia, a 1914 Brougham in excellent condition.

== In popular culture ==
A Detroit Electric is featured in the Peter Gunn episode Love me To Death (season 1, episode 31, broadcast date April 27, 1959).

The Disney cartoon character Grandma Duck drives a red car with license plate number "1902" that appears similar to a Detroit Electric.
A Detroit Electric is featured in the Perry Mason episode The Case of the Borrowed Baby (season 5, episode 26, broadcast date April 14, 1962). The Detroit Electric Car Company is featured in D.E. Johnson's crime novel The Detroit Electric Scheme published in September, 2010.

Comedian Jay Leno restored (restomodded) a Detroit Electric between 2015 and 2020.

== Gallery ==
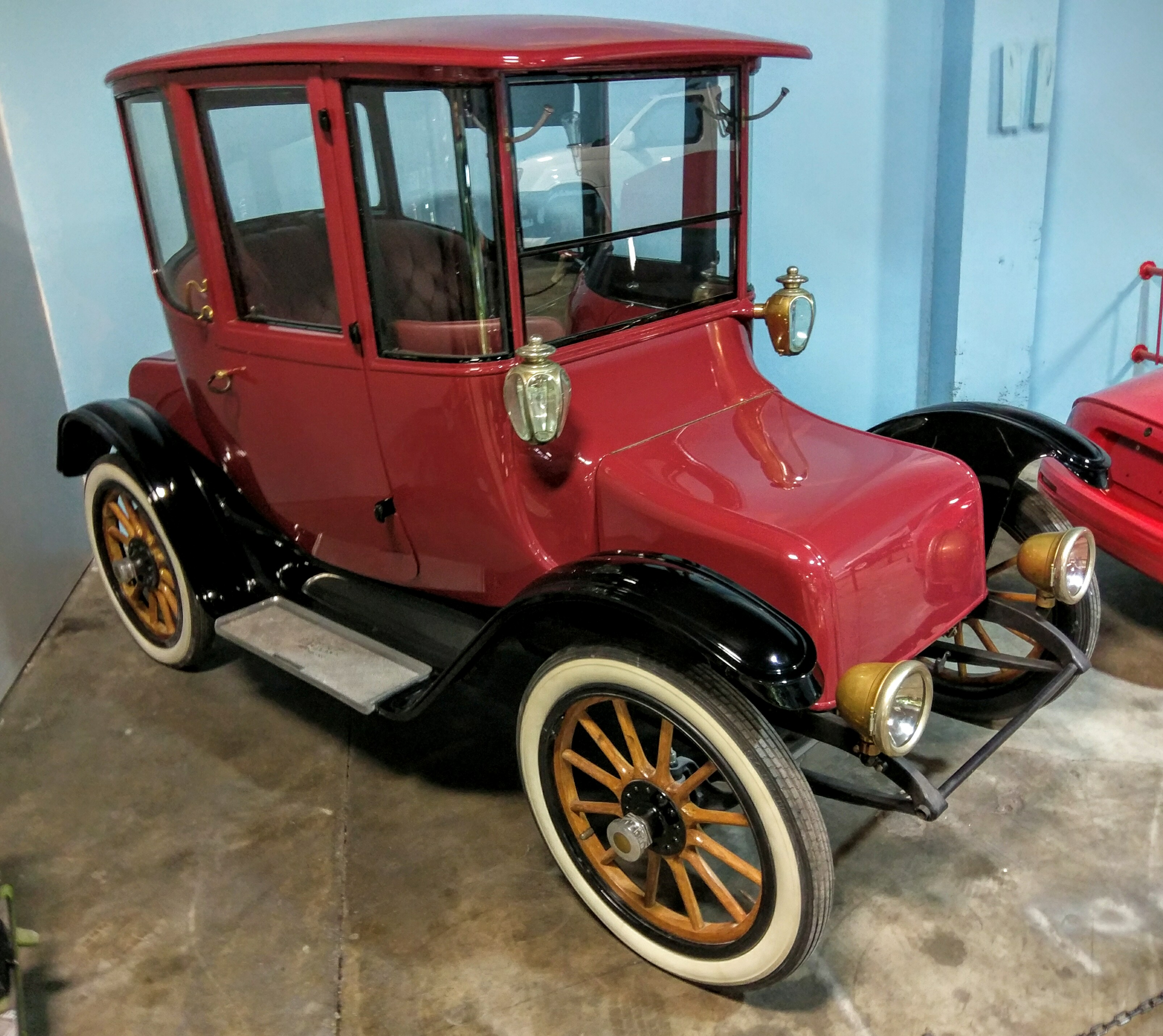
1911 Detroit Electric at the California Automobile Museum

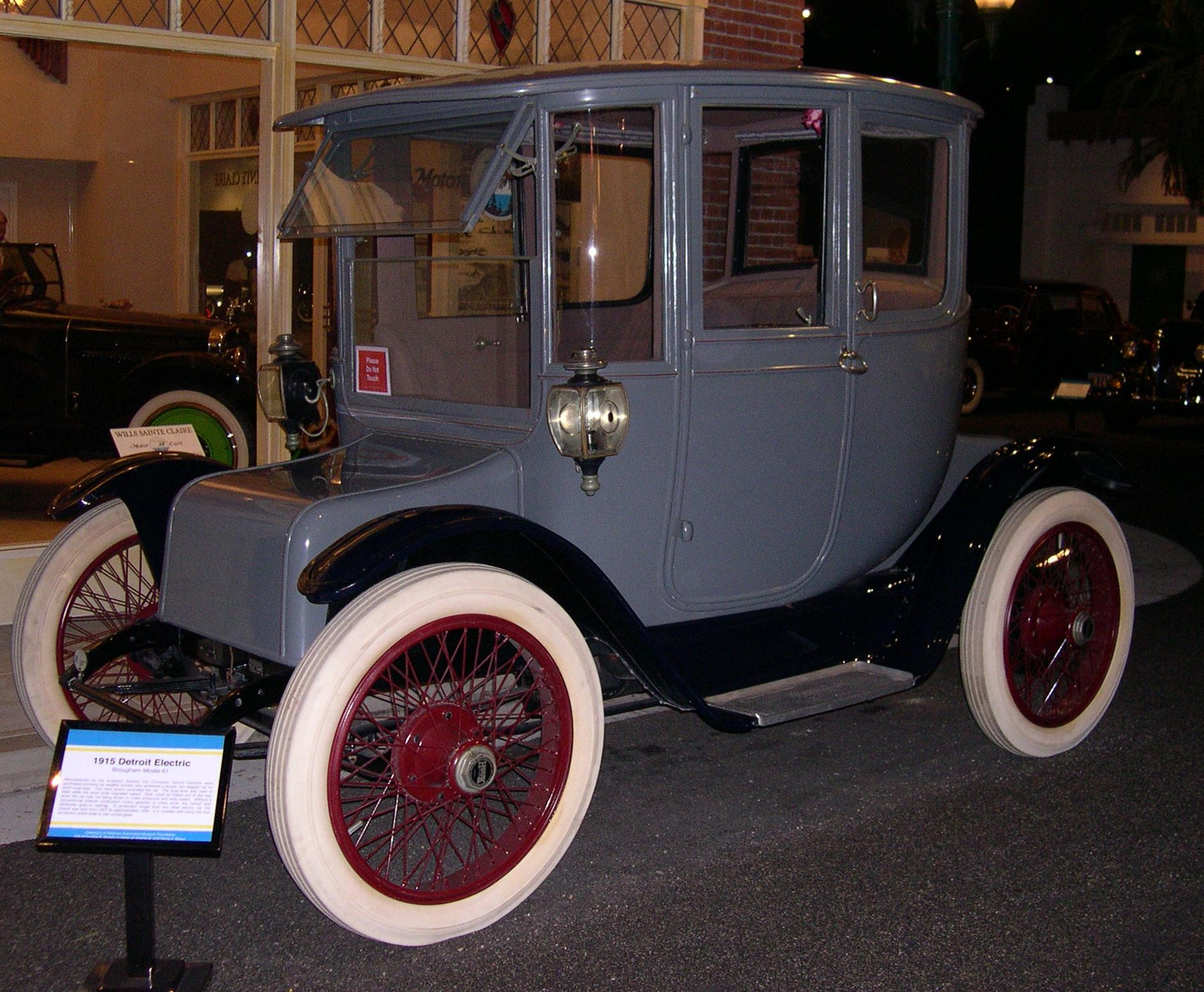
1915 Detroit Electric Brougham

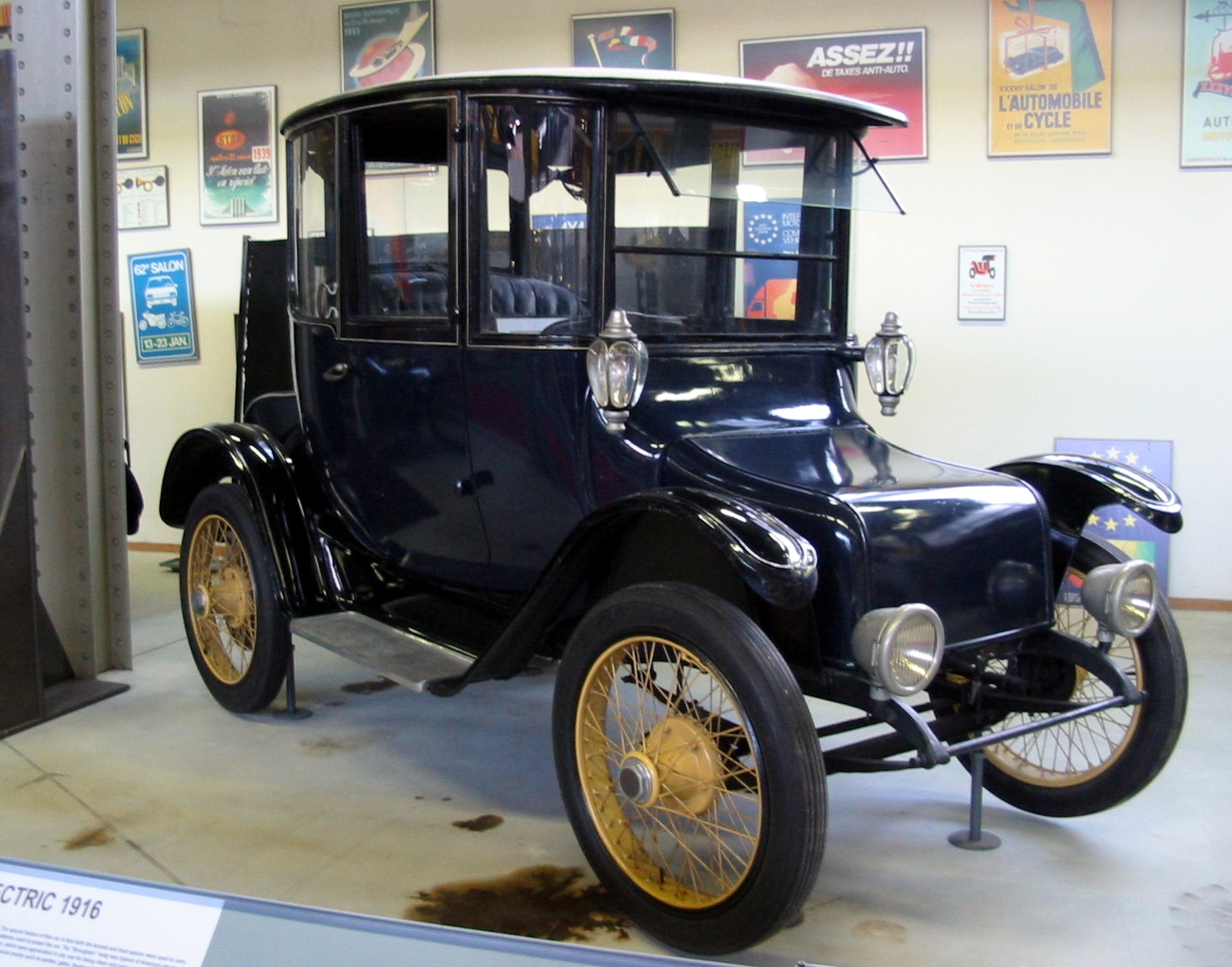
1916 Detroit Electric at the Brussels Autoworld Museum

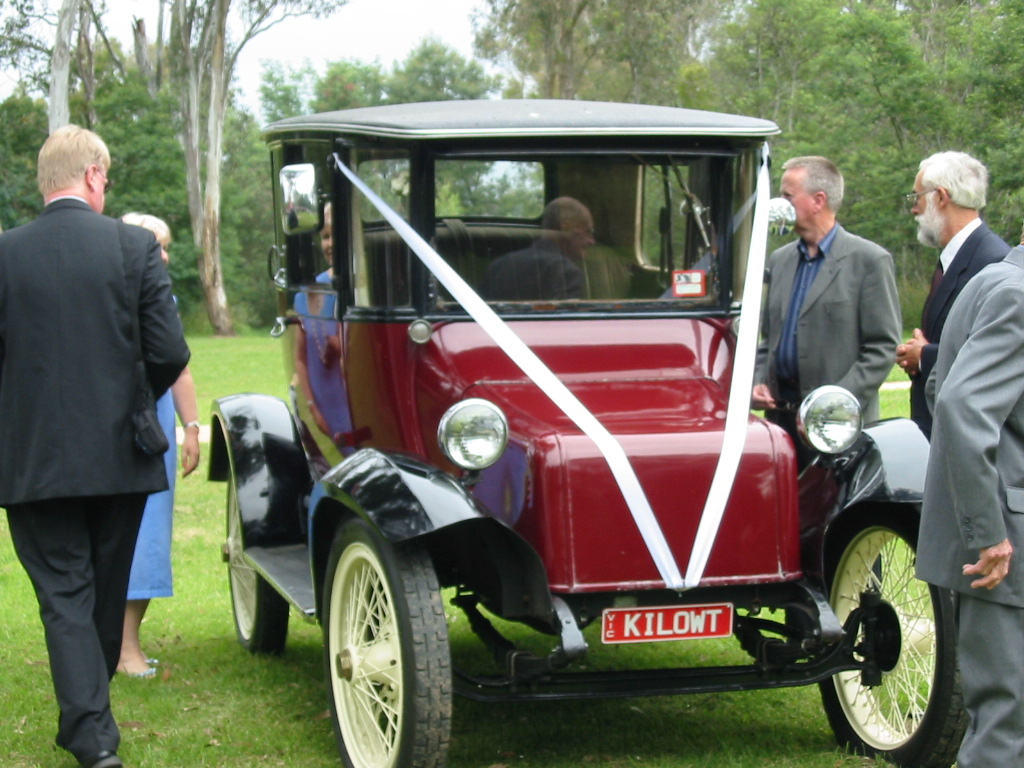
1917 Detroit Electric in Maffra, Australia

== See also ==
- History of the electric vehicle
