= Argo (automobile) =

Defunct American motor vehicle manufacturer

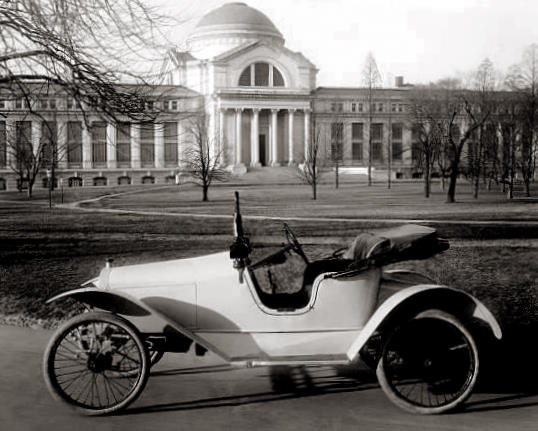
An Argo parked in front of the National Museum of Natural History in Washington, D.C. circa 1915

The Argo was a short-lived American automobile manufactured by the Argo Motor Co in Jackson, Michigan, between 1914 and 1918. Previously, the factory had been used by the Standard Electric Car Co to build an electric car.

The company originally made the four-cylinder "Motorvique" cyclecar based on the Ajax built by the Briscoe brothers in France. It had a 4-cylinder 12 hp engine and was different from the French market Ajax only in that it did not use friction drive.

Few cyclecars sold well in America, and in 1916, it was replaced by a conventional 22 hp assembled touring car in an attempt to rival Ford at producing a "motor car for the millions". The 1916 model sold for $405 in two-seater form.

In 1917 the company was sold to Mansell Hackett, and the name was changed to Hackett and moved its operations to Grand Rapids, Michigan.

The company had an unknown connection with the Saginaw, Michigan, based Argo Electric vehicle company.
