= AMC Amitron =

Concept electric car designed by American Motors Corporation

Amitron
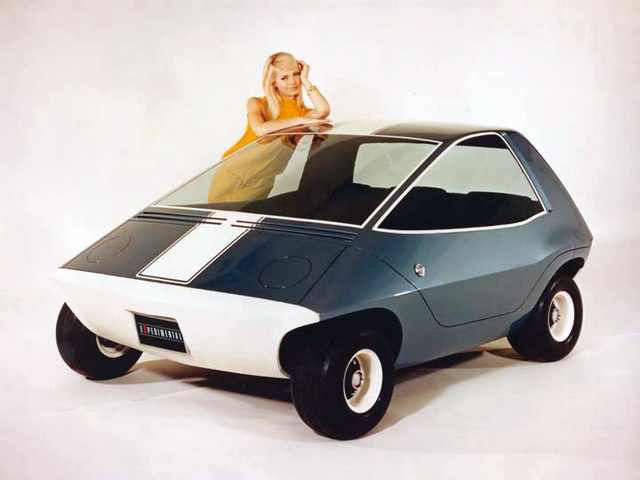
- The Amitron as shown in 1967

Overview
- Manufacturer: American Motors (AMC) and Gulton Industries
- Production: 1967 (concept car)
- Designer: Dick Teague

Body and chassis
- Class: Subcompact car
- Body style: 1-door hatchback
- Layout: FF layout
- Doors: Canopy door

Powertrain
- Engine: DC series traction
- Battery: 22.5 kWh lithium batteries with supplementary nickel-cadmium batteries

Dimensions
- Length: 85 in (2,159 mm)
- Width: 69.5 in (1,765 mm)
- Curb weight: 1,100 lb (499 kg)

The AMC Amitron was an experimental electric subcompact car built in 1967 by American Motors Corporation (AMC) and Gulton Industries. It included many advanced features, including regenerative braking and advanced battery designs, to provide a 150-mile (240 km) range on a single charge. Development ended because of technology issues and the high cost of electric batteries.

In 1977, the prototype was updated and renamed Electron to become one of the automaker's "Concept 80" show cars.

American Motors' small concept car was "meant to be a prediction of future subcompact commuter cars." It introduced technologies that included a revolutionary braking system that took 50 years to become common in the automotive industry.

== Design ==
=== Impetus ===
Development of the Amitron was prompted by three bills passed by the 89th United States Congress, described collectively as the "Electric Vehicle Development Act of 1966", as well as a fourth bill that amended the Clean Air Act of 1963. The legislation provided funding for electric car research in response to the rapidly decreasing air quality caused by automobile emissions. Development of electric vehicles was undertaken by the domestic big three automobile manufacturers, as well as AMC. Electrically powered cars were also seen as a way for the U.S. to reduce its reliance on "expensive, undependable oil imports."

=== Powertrain ===
American Motors entered into a partnership with Gulton Industries of Metuchen, New Jersey (acquired by Mark IV Industries in 1986) to develop the battery and power handling electronics for the car. Their entry into the electric car market was significantly more advanced than other developments, including two types of batteries for fast and slow power release and charging, as well as regenerative brakes to help extend range.

The primary power source consisted of two 75 lb (34 kg) lithium-nickel-fluoride batteries rated at 150 watt-hours per pound, or 331 watt-hours per kilogram, with a total capacity of 22.5 kWh. The designers selected lithium for the Amitron because "it is both highly reactive (easy to oxidize) and has high electromotive potential." The downside to these batteries is that they have relatively low instantaneous power, too little to provide reasonable acceleration, or be able to handle the rapid recharging during regenerative braking. A secondary power source consisting of two 24 lb (11 kg) nickel-cadmium (NiCd, often read ni-cad) batteries was used to handle higher power peaks. These batteries could accelerate the car to 50 mph (80 km/h) in 20 seconds. During driving, the lithium batteries recharged the ni-cads, which continued to power the motor.

The regenerative system would automatically switch the drive motors to generators as the car slowed so that the ni-cads could recharge, thus increasing the range of the car. The regenerative braking control was designed "to provide the same brake pedal "feel" as a conventional car. This was the first use of regenerative braking technology in the U.S. automobile industry.

Altogether, the system provided the car with a range of 150-mile (241 km) when traveling at 50 mph (80 km/h). Its total battery weight of only 200 lb (91 kg) was also light for electric vehicles. The equivalent in lead-acid cells would weigh nearly a ton (907 kg). A solid-state power management system controlled the entire system.

The first road tests of the batteries and powertrain were in 1968 using a converted conventional Rambler American sedan. At the time, AMC's vice president of design, Dick Teague, was working on a car called "the Voltswagon". The supporters of the Amitron were confident and stated that "We don't see a major obstacle in the technology. It's just a matter of time."

=== Body ===
The Amitron was designed to minimize power loss by keeping down rolling resistance, wind drag resistance, and vehicle weight. The prototype was a snub-snouted three-passenger urban area vehicle or city car with an overall length of only 85 inches (2,159 mm). Among its unique design features were passenger seats that had air-filled cushions, rather than conventional polyurethane (foam rubber). The car did not feature conventional bodyside doors, but the canopy of the vehicle was hinged up and backward ("clamshell-type" on rear-mounted pivots) for entry and egress.

American Motors put more effort into making its prototype electric car more attractive than its competitors. "The modern looking Amitron was one of the most promising electrics developed in the Sixties." During the December 1967 public introduction of the car, Roy D. Chapin Jr., chairman and chief executive officer of AMC, stated that the Amitron "could eliminate many problems that up to this point have made electric-type cars impractical".

=== Potential market ===
American Motors' original plans were to offer the Amitron for sale to commuters and urban shoppers in five years. Chapin said AMC had discussed the venture with its bankers and creditors, and "they are about as enthusiastic about it". The Amitron was also well received by the public. The new technology was still in the infant stage and it was not expected to be popular "until the end of the decade." Competitors were also skeptical of AMC's rapid deployment, stating it would take ten years to have a practical battery. Moreover, research programs to develop clean transportation in the U.S. ceased. The Amitron did not go beyond the prototype stage. The expensive batteries forced AMC to halt further experiments with advanced technology electric vehicles for several years.

=== Legacy ===
The rebadged 1977 AMC Electron gained rear-view side mirrors

The AMC Pacer was influenced by the Amitron's short, wide dimensions, along with optionally including three front seats. The abruptly terminating rear end of the concept car influenced the AMC Gremlin.

American Motors' battery-powered vehicle development continued under a partnership with Gould (Gould Electronics after selling its battery operations) that led to the mass production of the Jeep DJ-5E starting in 1974. This rear-wheel-drive mini-delivery van was also known as the Electruck. Regenerative braking was effective at speeds above 22.5 mph (36.2 km/h) and the system included current-limiting to prevent overcharging the lead-acid batteries.

In 1977, AMC introduced their "Concept 80" line of experimental vehicles, which included the AM Van, Grand Touring, Concept I, Concept II, and Jeep II. Along with this lineup, AMC renamed the Amitron to Electron, added side-view mirrors to the windows, and gave it a fresh paint job. The show car was not driveable because it did not have a power train.

The design has been characterized by some observers as "hot, sexy, cute and practical." The exterior's angular design was also ahead of its time because it was not until the 1970s that wedge-shaped bodies were finally adopted for production cars. The Amitron featured a polygonal exterior design that "looks like a miniature Cybertruck" that was unveiled in late 2019 by Tesla, Inc.

The AMC car "laid down principles that looked to represent the future of urban travel, but it was just too advanced for its own good." "The AMC Amitron had almost 50 years ago all that is still considered indispensable for an electric car if it is supposed to succeed: a decent range, low weight, and a jaunty look."
