= Standard Electric (automobile) =

Defunct American motor vehicle manufacturer

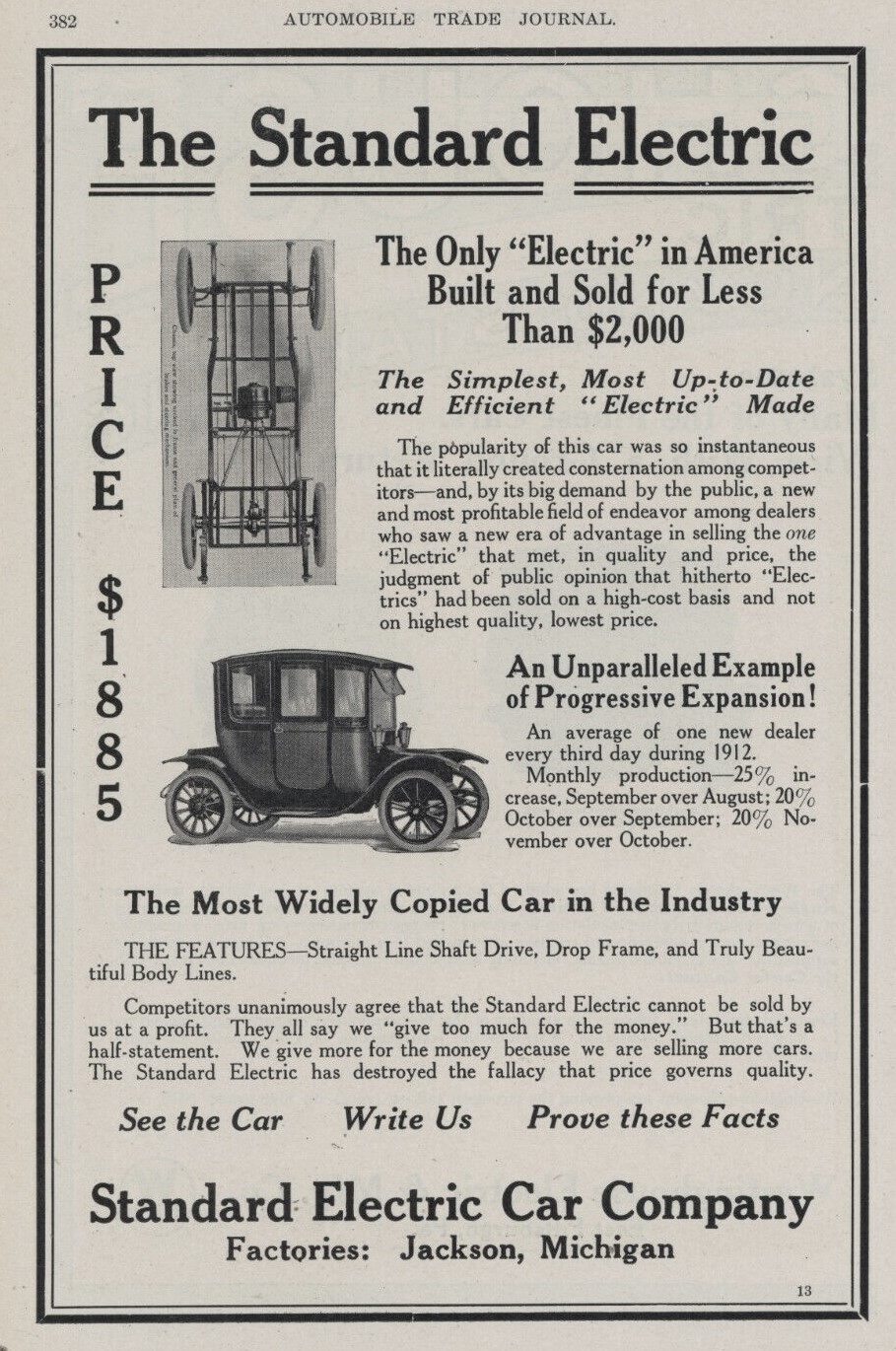
1913 Standard Electric advertisement

The Standard Electric automobile was an electric car manufactured by the Standard Electric Car Company in Jackson, Michigan from 1912 to 1915.

== History ==
The Standard Electric used electric motors made by Westinghouse and claimed to have a range of 110 miles (180 km) on a charge. It was operated by a tiller from the left-hand side. The controller had six forward speeds, and had a top speed of 20 miles per hour (32 km/h). The model M was a closed model coupe or open runabout, and priced from $1,785 to $1,900, equivalent to $61,894 in 2025.

In 1913 the company name was changed to Standard Car Manufacturing Company. In November 1915, Standard Car closed and sold their plant to Benjamin Briscoe who moved in to build his Argo cyclecar.
