= Electric car =

Car propelled by an electric motor using energy stored in batteries

Modern all-electric cars

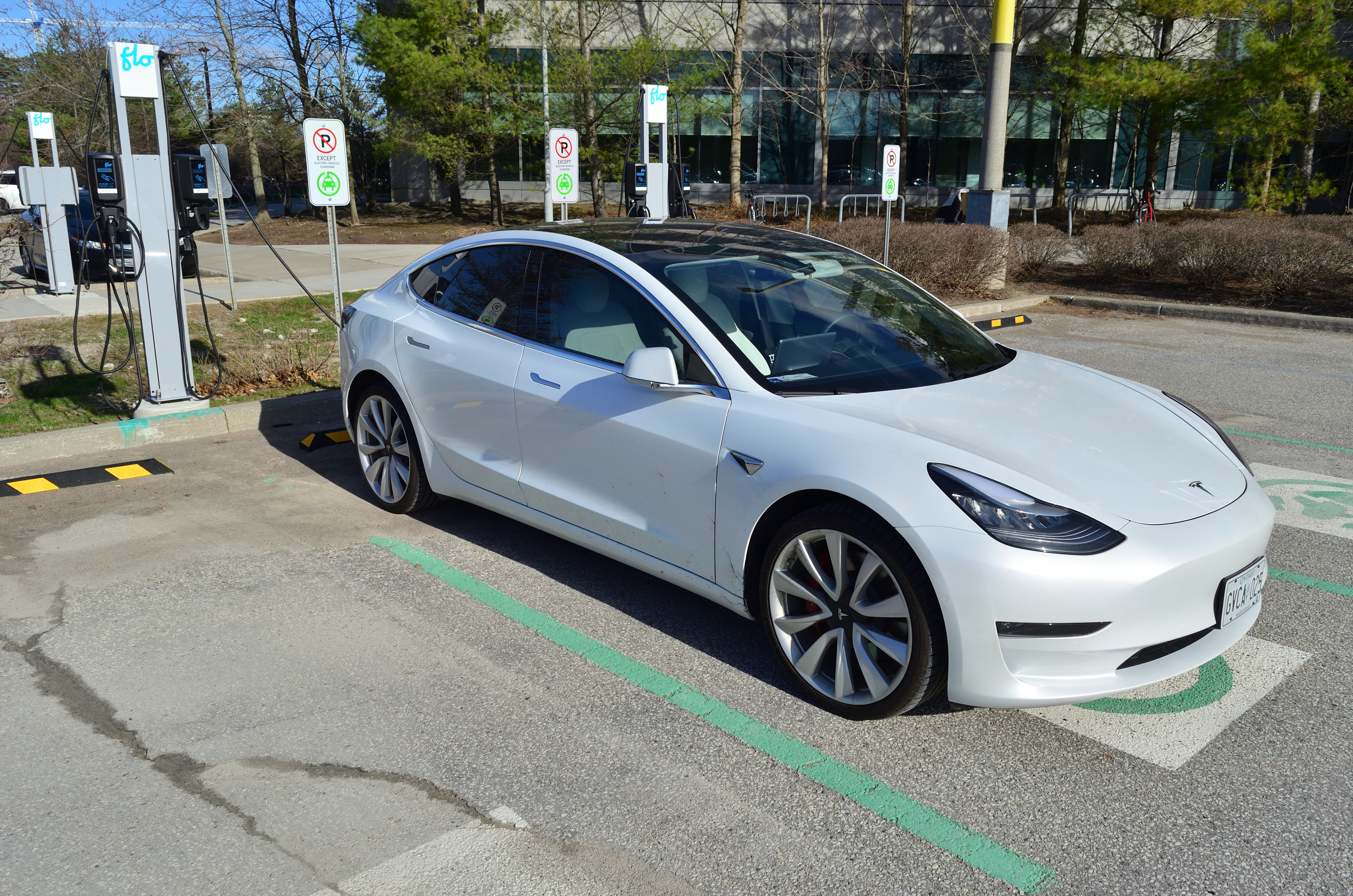
Tesla Model 3

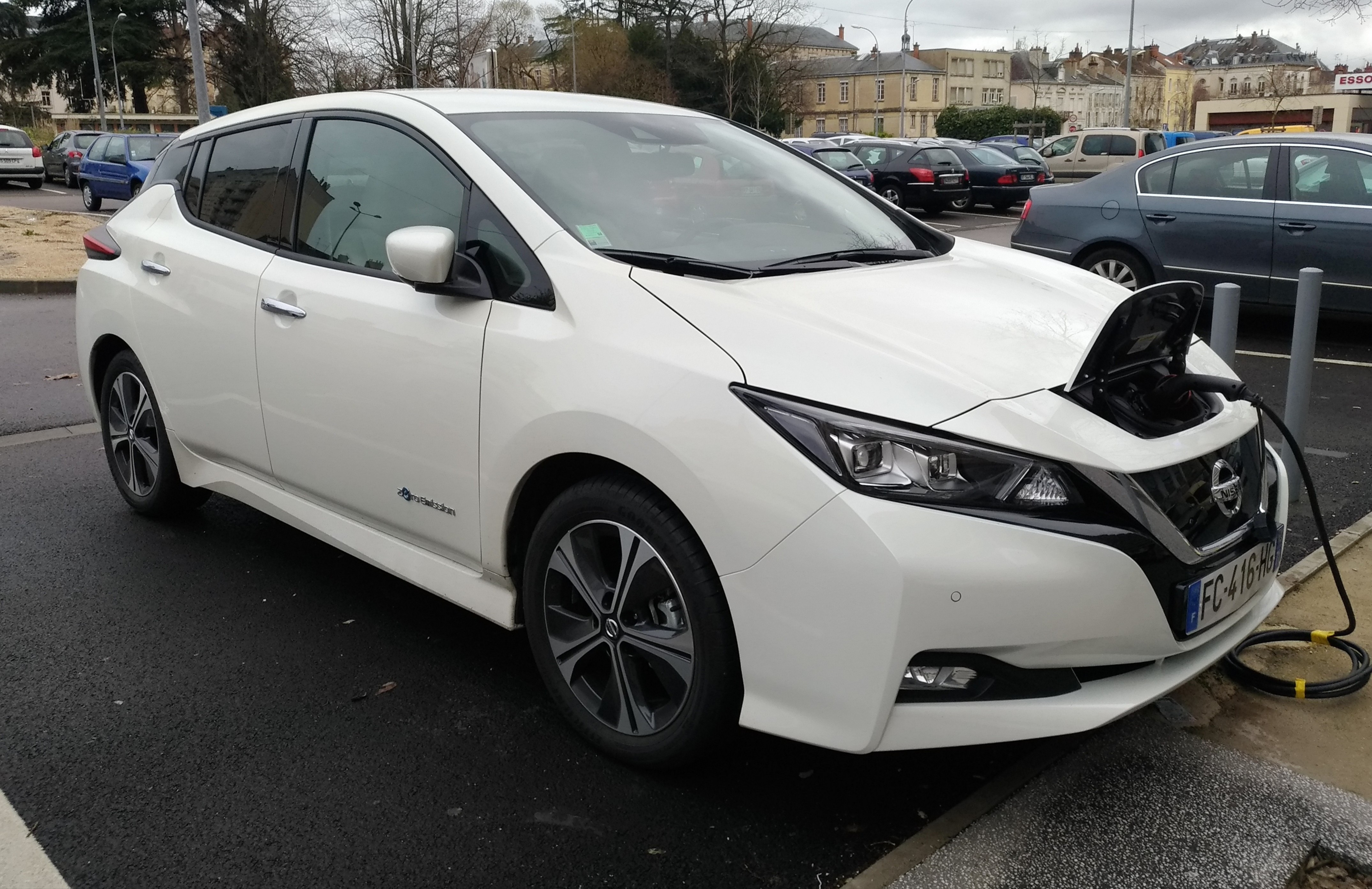
Nissan Leaf

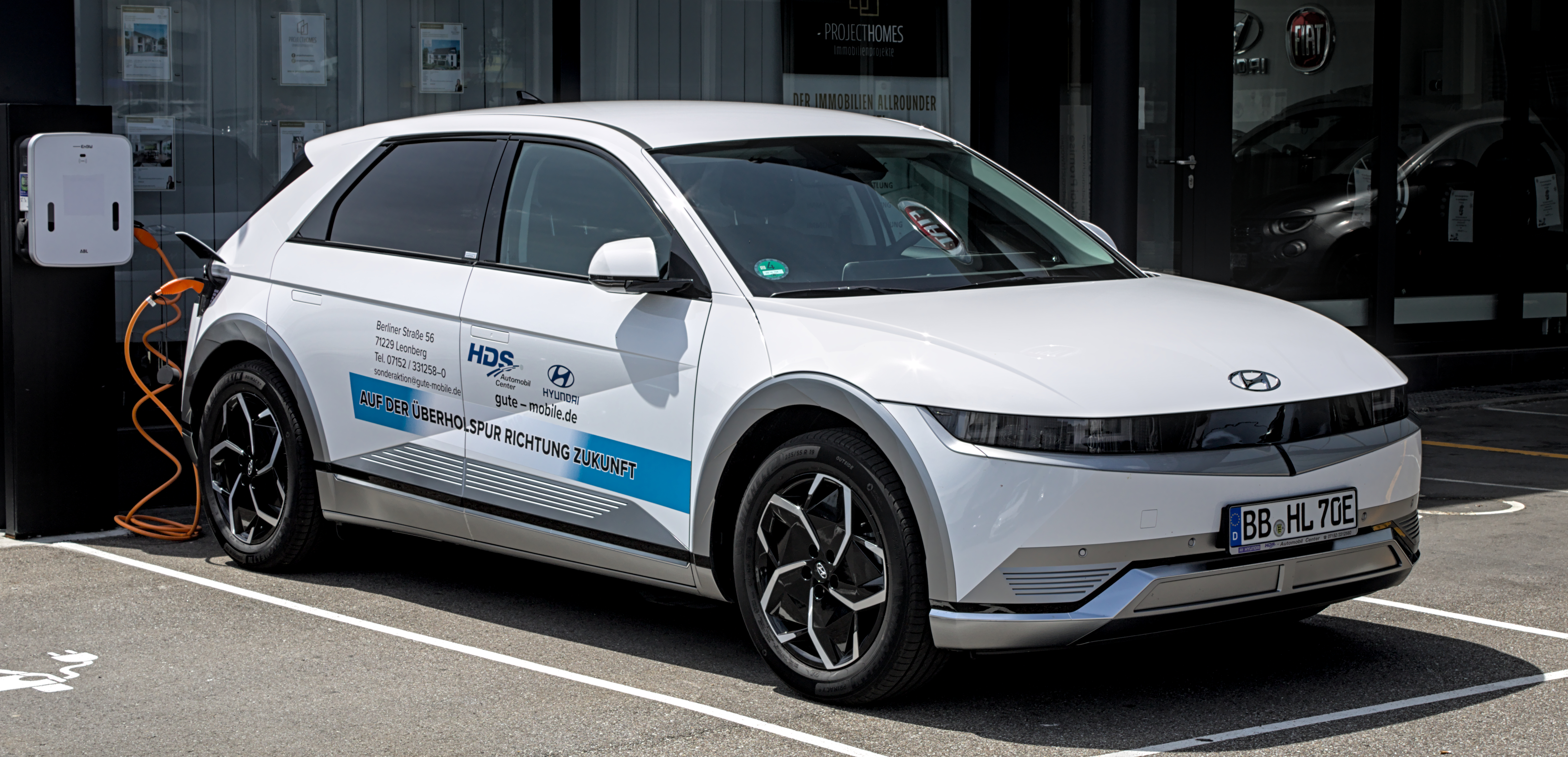
Hyundai Ioniq 5

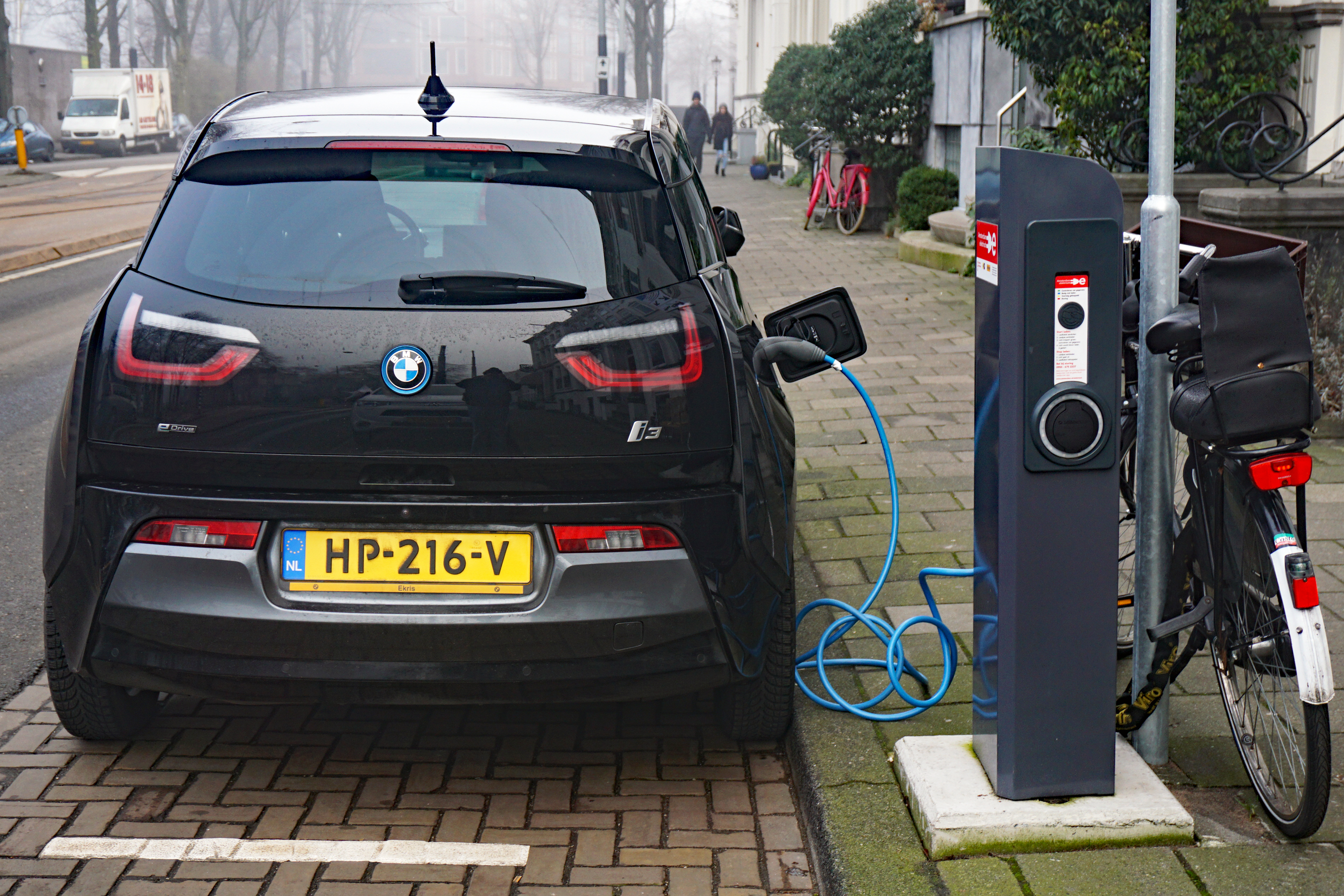
BMW i3

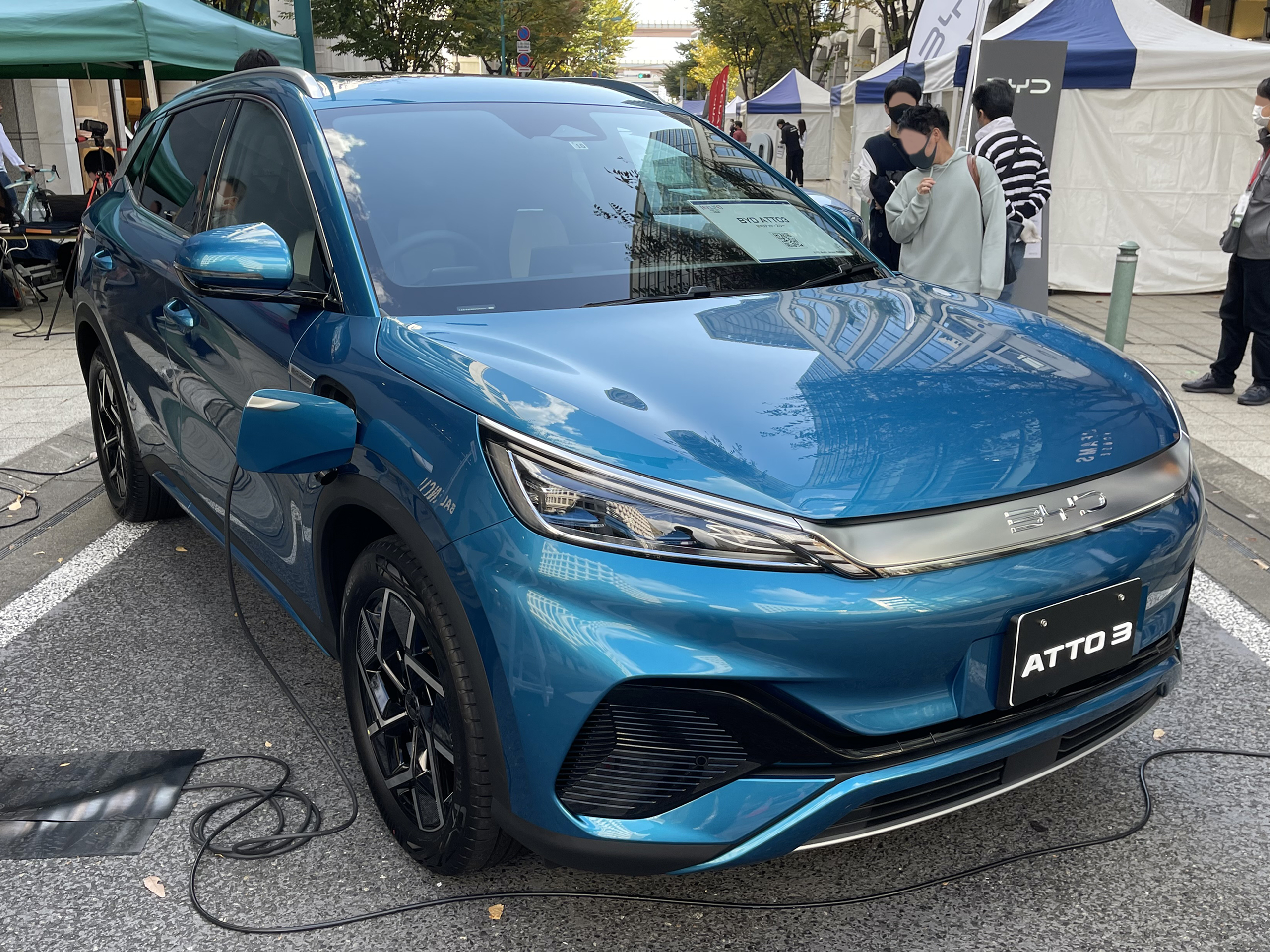
BYD Atto 3

An electric car is an automobile that uses electrical energy as the primary source of propulsion. The term normally refers to a plug-in electric vehicle, typically a battery electric vehicle (BEV), which only uses energy stored in on-board battery packs, but broadly may also include plug-in hybrid electric vehicle (PHEV), range-extended electric vehicle (REEV) and fuel cell electric vehicle (FCEV), which can convert electric power from other fuels via a generator or a fuel cell.

Compared to conventional internal combustion engine (ICE) vehicles, electric cars are quieter, more responsive, have superior energy conversion efficiency and produce no tailpipe emissions. Electric cars generally have a lower overall carbon footprint over their life cycle, from manufacturing to end of life, even when the electricity used for charging comes partly from fossil-fuel power stations. Electric cars generally have higher manufacturing emissions than comparable ICE vehicles, although they produce fewer greenhouse gas emissions during operation. Due to the superior efficiency of electric motors, electric cars also generate less waste heat, thus reducing the need for engine cooling systems that are often large, complicated and maintenance-prone in ICE vehicles. However, EVs may still use dedicated thermal management systems to regulate battery temperature.

The battery of a plug-in electric car is typically recharged by connecting it to an external electricity supply. Recharging an electric car can be done at different kinds of charging stations; depending on local regulations and utility requirements, these charging stations can be installed in private homes, parking garages and public areas. There is also research and development in, as well as deployment of, other technologies such as battery swapping and inductive charging. As charging stations (especially fast chargers) become more widely available, range anxiety and the time required to charge remain psychological barriers for some consumers considering the purchase of an electric car. Governments and electric vehicle manufacturers have introduced various initiatives to expand charging infrastructure, improve charging accessibility and address these concerns.

Worldwide, 21 million plug-in electric cars were sold in 2025, accounting for one-quarter of new car sales and representing an increase of more than 20% compared with 2024. Many countries have established government incentives for plug-in electric vehicles, including tax credits, subsidies, and other non-monetary incentives while several countries have legislated to phase-out of fossil fuel vehicles, to reduce air pollution and limit climate change.

China has the world's largest stock of new energy vehicles, with 31.4 million vehicles in use (vehicle ownership) at the end of 2024, including 22.09 million battery electric vehicles (BEVs). These figures also include heavy-duty commercial vehicles such as buses, garbage trucks and sanitation vehicles, and only account for vehicles manufactured in China. As of 2020, the total cost of ownership of recent electric vehicles in the United States and European Union was lower than that of equivalent ICE cars, due to lower power and maintenance costs.

In 2023, the Tesla Model Y became the world's best-selling car. The Tesla Model 3 became the world's all-time best-selling electric car in early 2020, and in June 2021 it became the first electric car to pass 1 million global sales.

== Terminology ==
The term "electric car" typically refers specifically to battery electric vehicles (BEVs) or all-electric cars, a type of electric vehicle (EV) that has an onboard rechargeable battery pack that can be plugged in and charged from the electric grid, or at home with solar panels, and the electricity stored on the vehicle is the only energy source that provides propulsion for the wheels. The term generally refers to highway-capable automobiles, but there are also low-speed electric vehicles with limitations in terms of weight, power, and maximum speed that are allowed to travel on certain public roads. The latter are classified as Neighborhood Electric Vehicles (NEVs) in the United States, and as electric motorised quadricycles in Europe.

Electric car stocks

Electric car sales share

Electric car sales

Battery electric vehicles as share of new EVs

== History ==
=== Early developments ===
Between 1832 and 1839, the Scottish inventor Robert Anderson developed a crude electric carriage.

The following experimental electric cars appeared during the 1880s:

- In 1881, Gustave Trouvé presented an electric car driven by an improved Siemens motor at the Exposition internationale d'Électricité de Paris.
- In 1882 Werner von Siemens presented the Electromote, the world's first trolleybus, in Berlin.
- In 1884, Thomas Parker built an electric car in Wolverhampton, England, using his own specially designed high-capacity rechargeable batteries, although the only documentation is a photograph from 1895.
- In 1888, the German inventor Andreas Flocken designed the Flocken Elektrowagen, regarded as the first "real" electric car.
- In 1890, William Morrison introduced the first practical electric car to the United States.

Electricity was among the preferred methods for automobile propulsion in the late 19th and early 20th centuries, providing a level of comfort and an ease of operation that could not be achieved by the era's internal combustion cars. The electric vehicle fleet then peaked at approximately 30,000 vehicles.

In 1897, electric cars found commercial use as taxis in Britain and in the United States. In London, Bersey electric cabs were the first self-propelled vehicles for hire at a time when cabs were horse-drawn. In 1897, New York City had a fleet of twelve hansom cabs and one brougham, based on the Electrobat II, introduced as part of a project partly funded by the Philadelphia Electric Storage Battery Company. During the 20th century, the main US manufacturers of electric vehicles included Anthony Electric, Baker, Columbia, Anderson, Edison, Riker, Milburn Wagon Company (Milburn Light Electric), Bailey Electric, and Detroit Electric.

Six electric cars held the land speed record in the 19th century. The last was the rocket-shaped La Jamais Contente, driven by Camille Jenatzy, which broke the 100 km/h (62 mph) speed barrier by reaching a top speed of 105.88 km/h (65.79 mph) in 1899.

Electric cars remained popular until advances in internal-combustion engine (ICE) cars left them behind. At the time, the shorter refueling times and lower production costs of ICE vehicles made them more attractive to consumers than electric cars. A decisive moment came with the 1912 introduction of the electric starter motor that replaced laborious and dangerous methods such as hand-cranking.

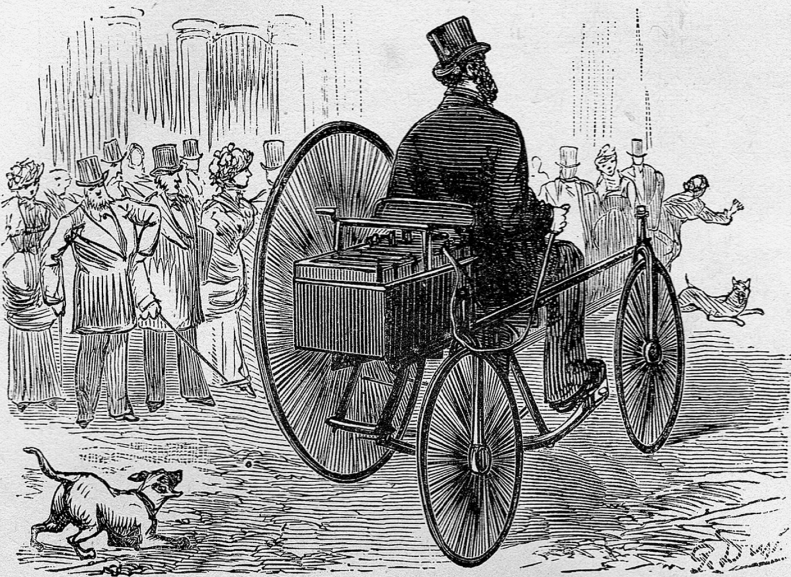
Gustave Trouvé's personal electric vehicle (1881), the world's first publicly presented full-scale electric car powered by an improved Siemens motor

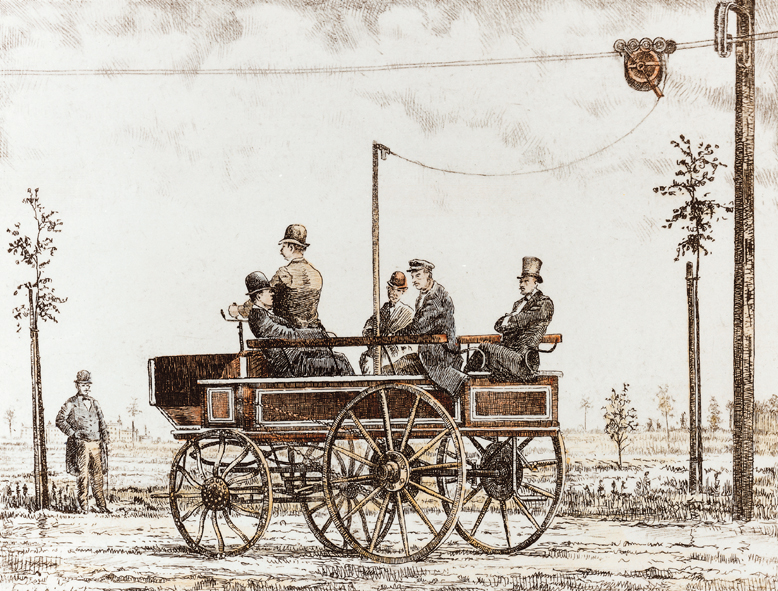
The Electromote, the world's first trolleybus by Werner von Siemens, Berlin 1882

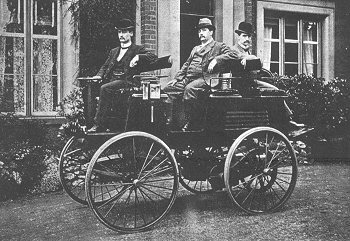
Electric car built by Thomas Parker in 1884 - photo from 1895

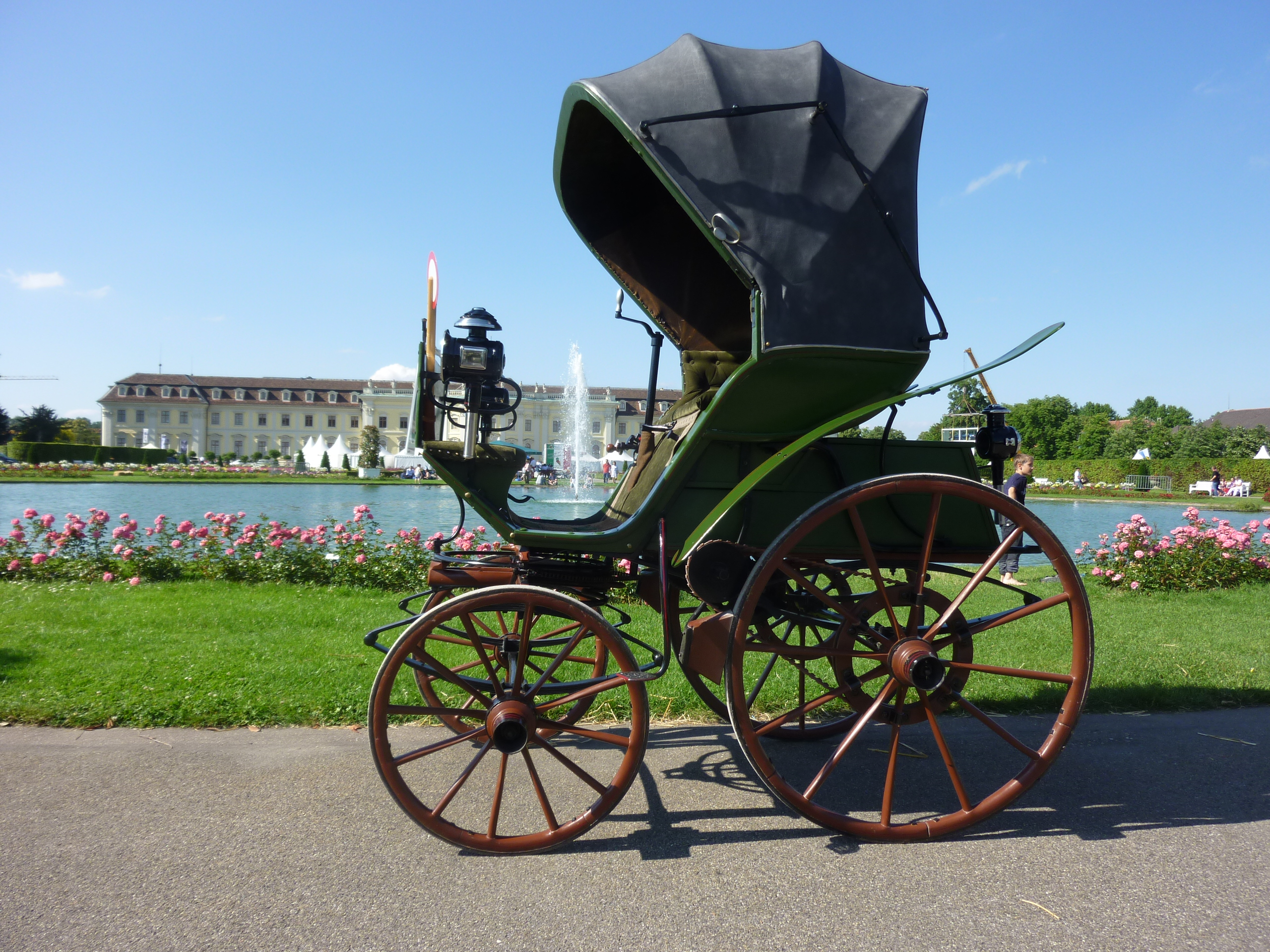
The Flocken Elektrowagen from 1888

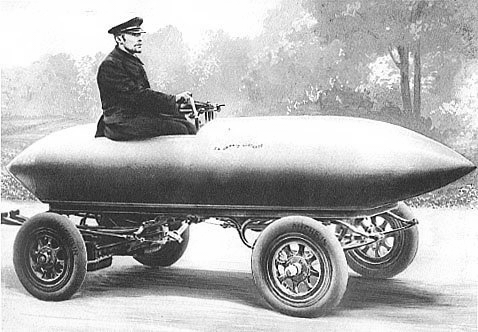
"La Jamais Contente", 1899

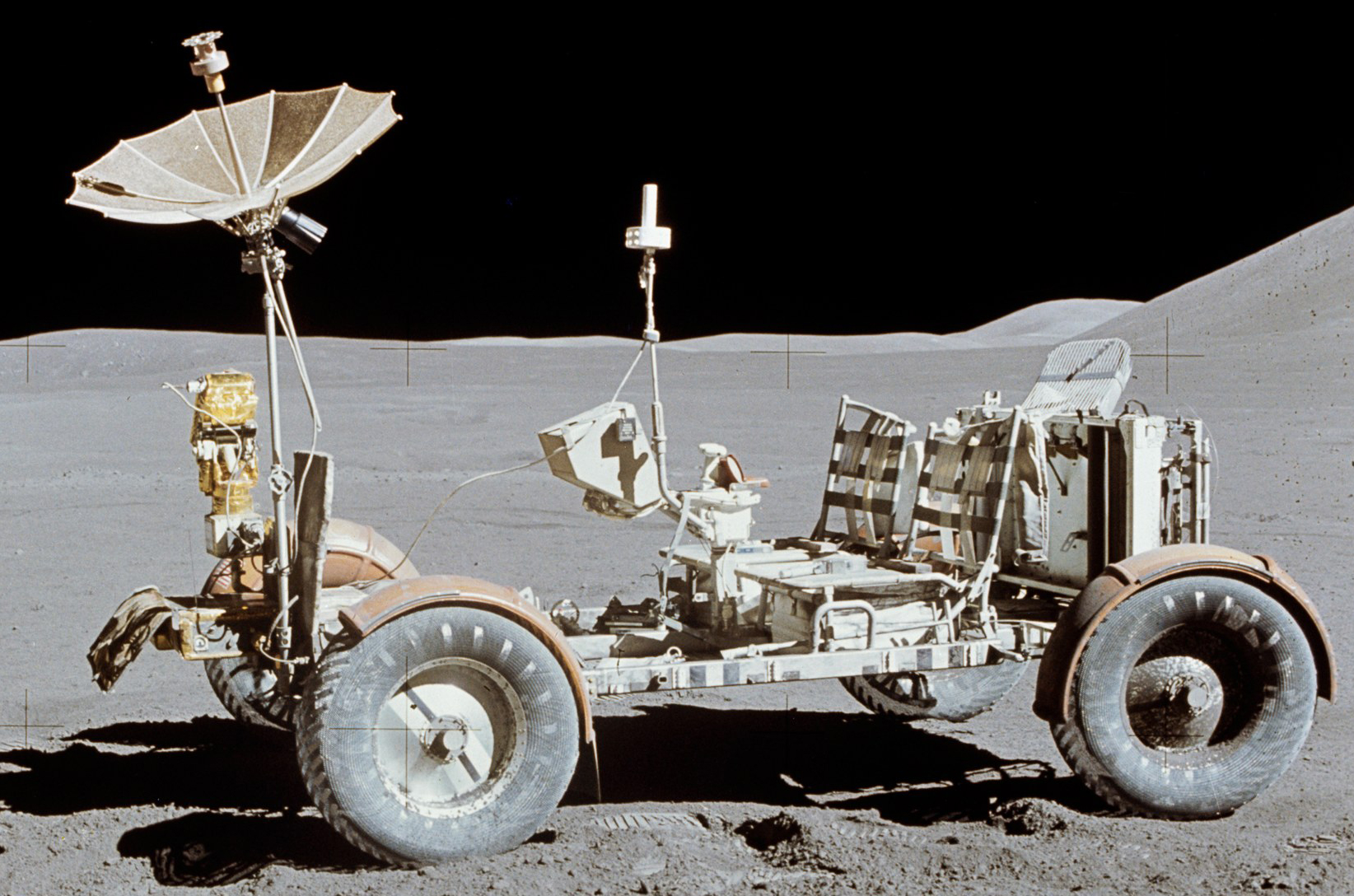
NASA's Lunar Roving Vehicles were battery-driven (1971).

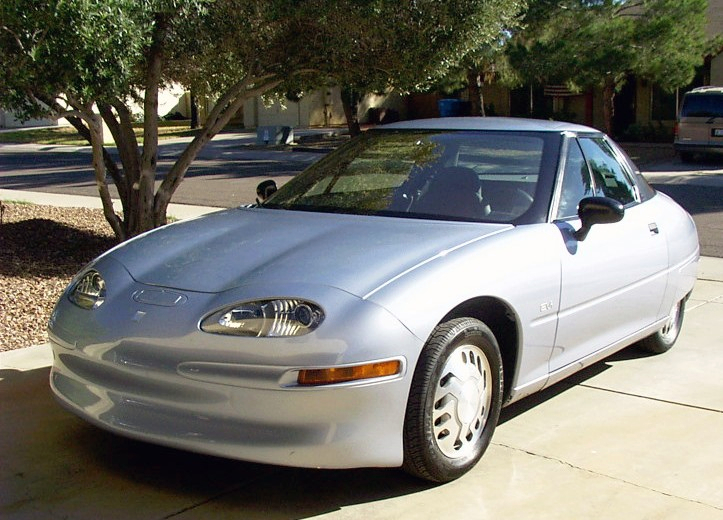
The General Motors EV1, one of the cars introduced due to a California Air Resources Board (CARB) mandate, had a range of 260 km (160 miles) with NiMH batteries in 1999.

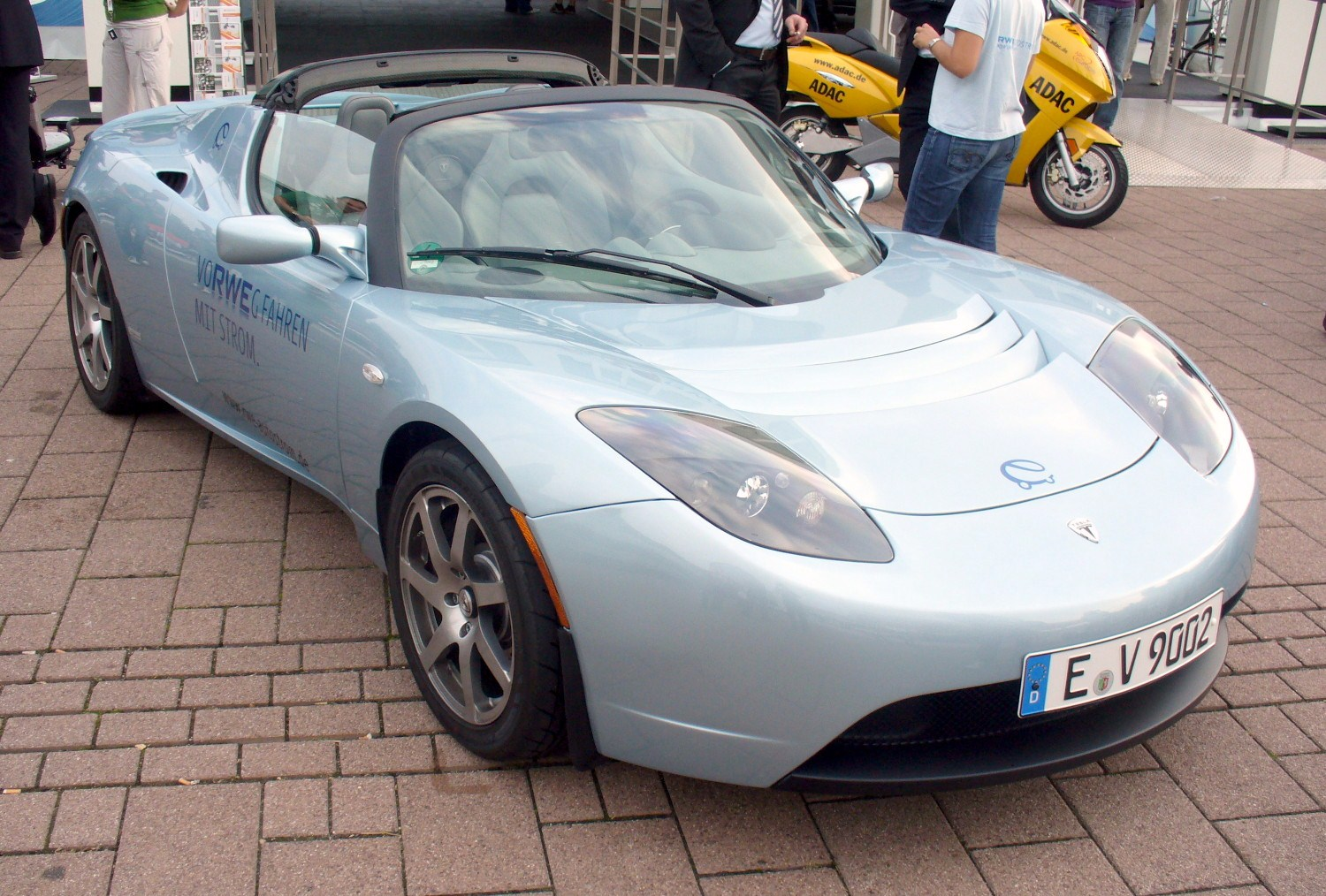
The Tesla Roadster (2008)

=== Renaissance ===
The global stock of both plug-in hybrid electric vehicles (PHEVs) and battery electric vehicles (BEVs) has grown steadily since the 2010s.

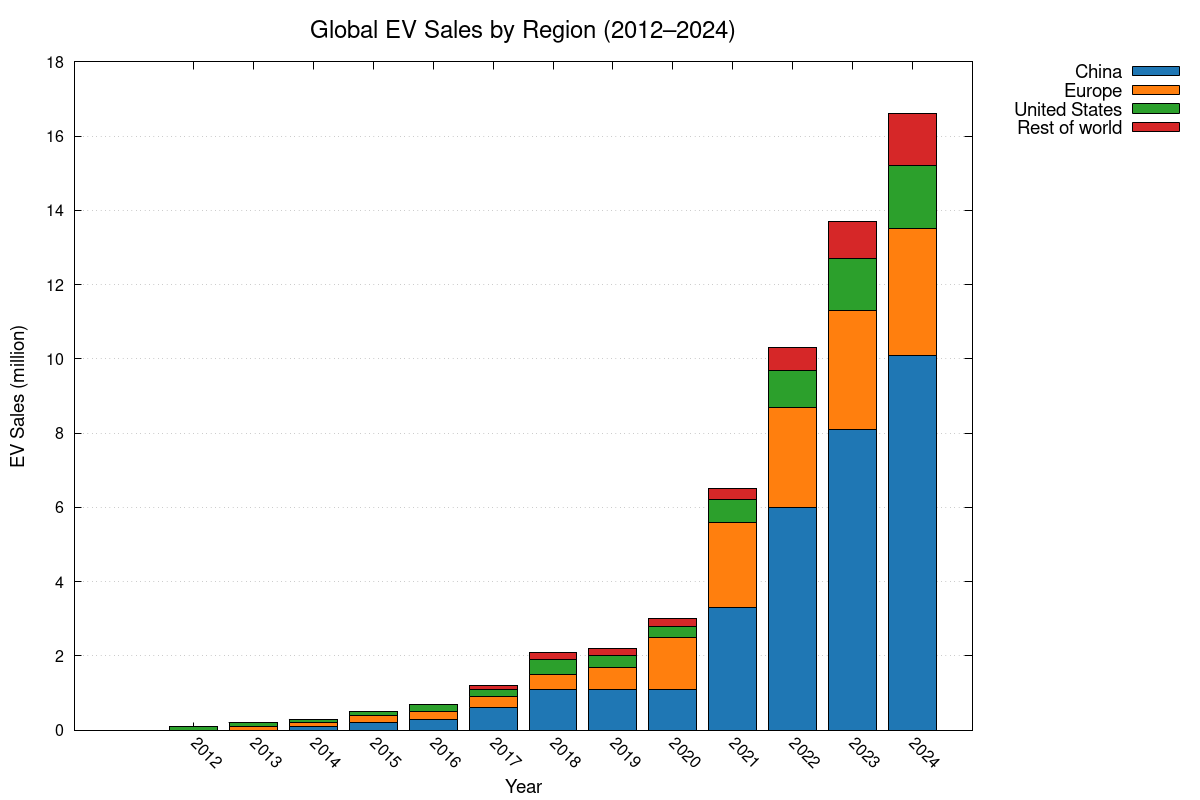
Sales of passenger electric vehicles (EVs) indicate a trend away from petrol-powered vehicles since 2012.

Percentage-of-total-sales figures for electric, plug-in hybrid, and hybrid vehicles approximately quadrupled from 2020 to 2026.

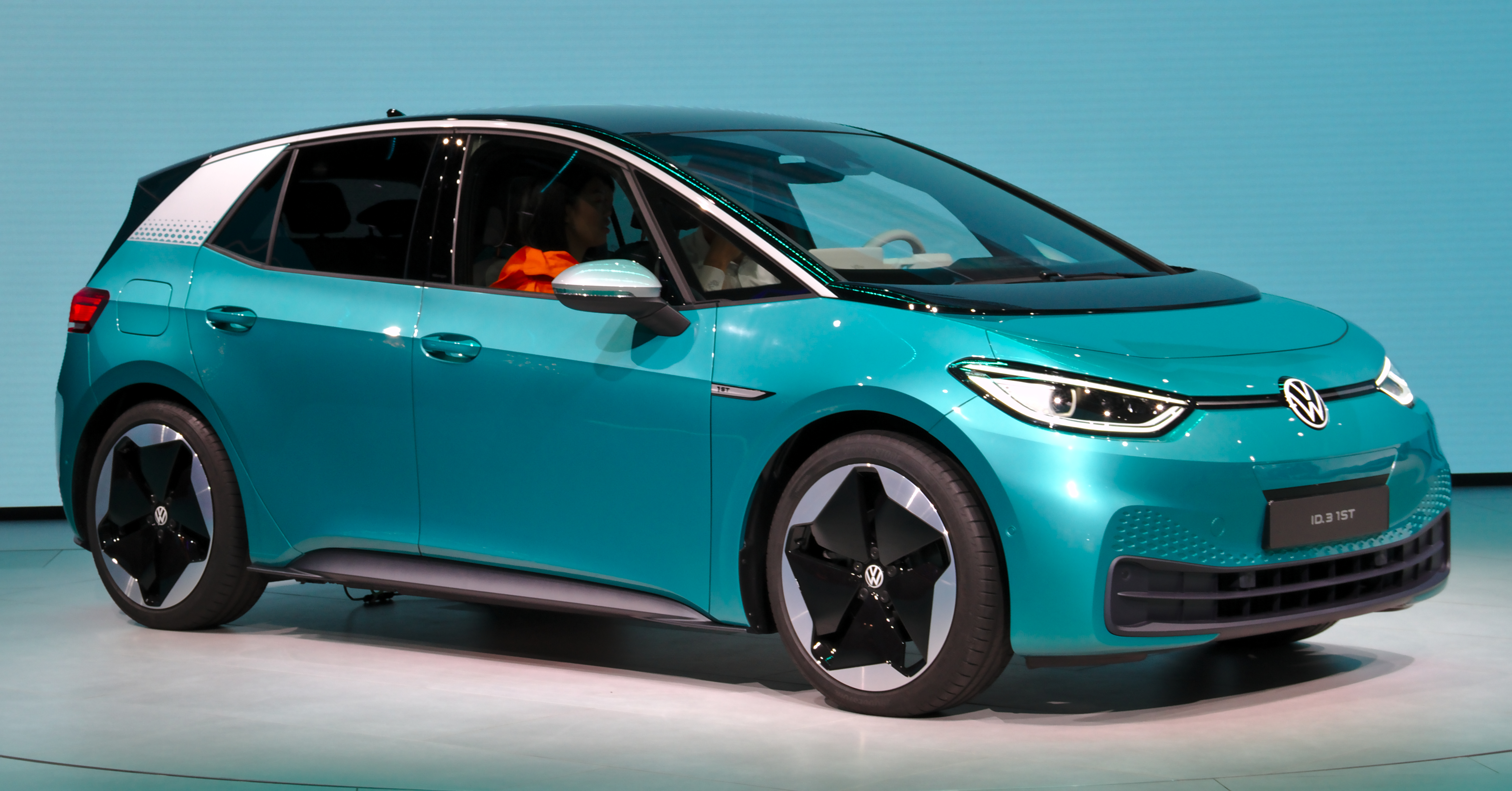
Volkswagen Group has invested in a wide-ranging electrification strategy in Europe, North America and China, including its electric "MEB" platform.

In the early 1990s the California Air Resources Board began to push for lower-emissions vehicles, with the ultimate goal of zero-emissions vehicles. Automakers responded with electric models, although they were later withdrawn.

California electric-automaker Tesla Motors began development in 2004 of what became the Tesla Roadster, first delivered to customers in 2008. The Roadster was the first highway-legal all-electric car to use lithium-ion battery cells, and the first production all-electric car to travel more than 320 km (200 miles) per charge.

Better Place developed battery charging and battery swapping services, but went bankrupt in 2013.

The 2009 Mitsubishi i-MiEV was the first highway-legal series production electric car, and the first to sell more than 10,000 units. The Nissan Leaf, launched in 2010, quickly surpassed it as the best-selling all-electric car.

In 2008, advances in battery technology, and the desire to reduce Greenhouse gas emissions and improve urban air quality increased interest in EVs. During the 2010s, EVs in China expanded rapidly with government support.

In July 2019 Motor Trend awarded the Tesla Model S the title "ultimate car of the year". In March 2020 the Tesla Model 3 passed the Nissan Leaf to become the best-selling electric car, with more than 500,000 units delivered; it reached 1 million units in June 2021.

In 2021, the Alliance for Automotive Innovation reported that the 187,000 sales of electric vehicles accounted for 6% of US light-duty vehicles. California led the United States with nearly 40% of purchases, followed by Florida with 6%, Texas with 5% and New York with 4.4%.

== Economics ==
EVs typically have a much lower cost of ownership than ICE vehicles. Early differences in purchase cost have shrunk due to intense competitive pressures.

=== Total cost of ownership ===
Generally, electricity costs less than petrol per kilometre travelled, although petrol and electricity prices vary dramatically by location, origin and even time of day. Petrol prices are affected by taxes and fuel formulation, while electricity can come from sources such as rooftop solar or the electric grid. EV motors are far more efficient than internal combustion engines, which convert at least 60% of the energy they consume into heat rather than propulsion.

The greater the distance driven per year, the more likely the total cost of ownership for an EV is less than for an equivalent ICE car.

EV drivers can save approximately 50% on maintenance and repair costs because EVs have a simpler mechanical structure and fewer moving parts than ICE vehicles.

==== Battery replacement ====
The risk of an out-of-warranty battery replacement represents the greatest source of long-term financial uncertainty for EV owners. Replacement battery packs typically cost between $5,000 and $16,000, depending on the pack size and manufacturer. In large, high-capacity trucks, replacement quotes have been reported to approach $47,000, e.g., for the Long Range Ford F-150 Lightning.

Battery replacement events are rare, and batteries have achieved greater durability than anticipated. EV batteries often outlast vehicle lifetimes with minimal degradation. Industry standard warranties cover batteries for 8 years or 100,000 miles, guaranteeing minimum capacity retention, typically at 70%.

=== Purchase cost ===
In 2024, electric cars were typically somewhat more expensive to purchase than ICE cars. That year saw a few categories where new electric cars were cheaper upfront than ICE vehicles. For instance, small EVs in China were roughly half the price of small petrol cars. Electric SUVs became cheaper than petrol ones for the first time in 2024 in China. In 2026, EVs in the UK had become cheaper to buy than petrol cars.

The largest cost item of an electric car is its battery. Battery prices decreased from €605 per kWh in 2010, to €170 in 2017, to €100 in 2019. LFP batteries are cheaper than the more powerful NCM cells.

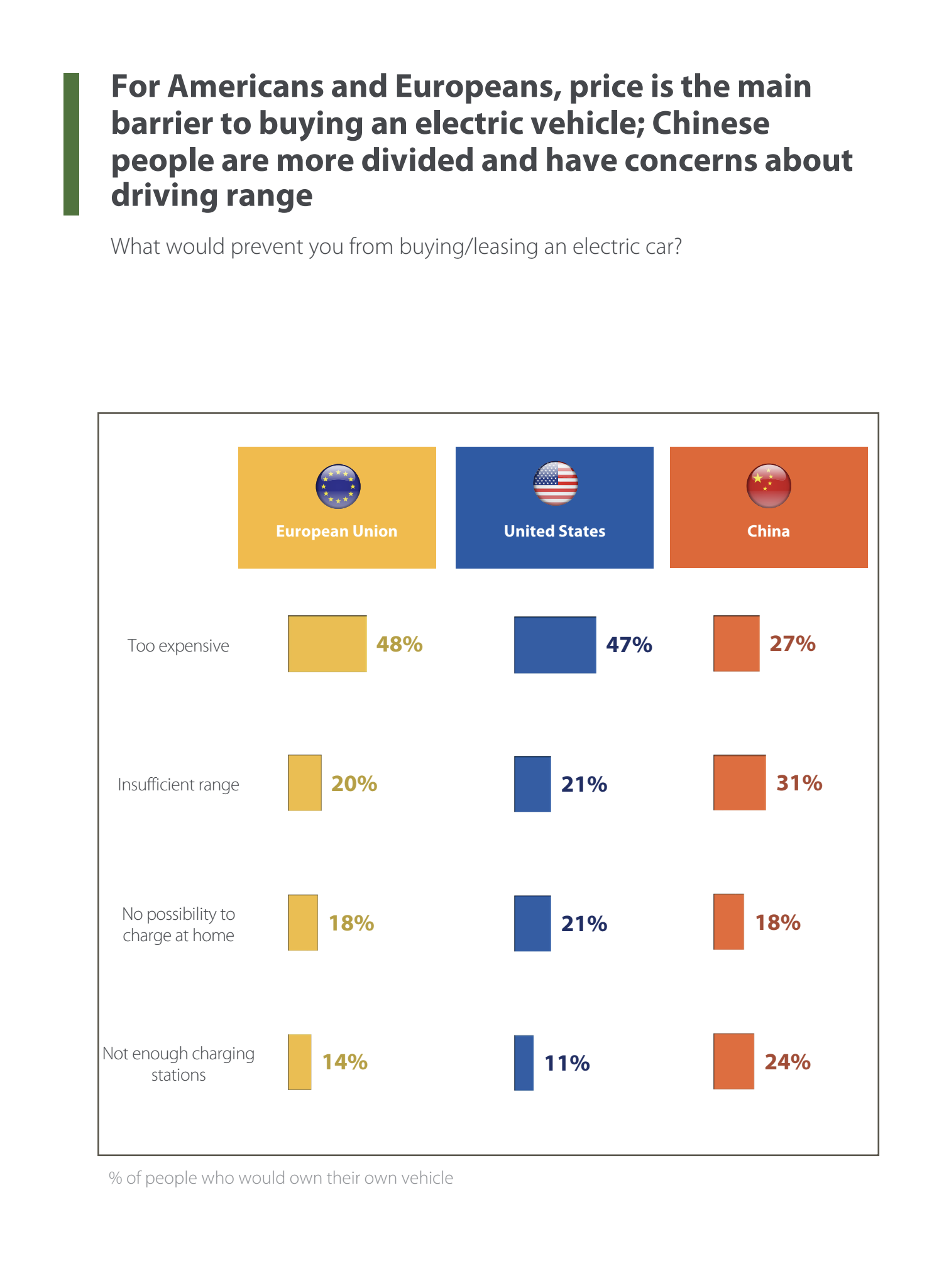
Survey results showing that for American and European respondents, price is the main barrier to buying an electric vehicle

== Environmental aspects ==
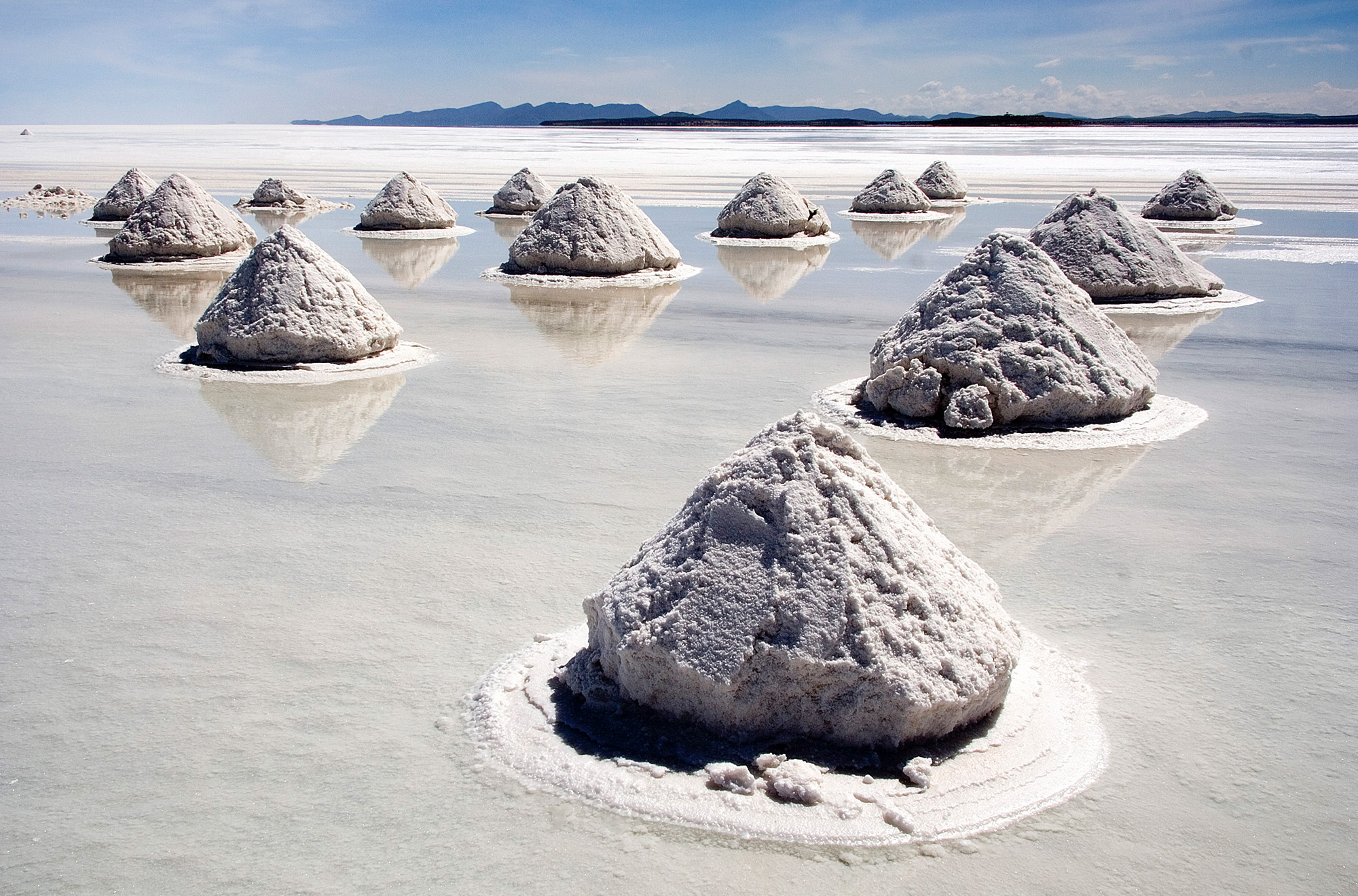
The Salar de Uyuni in Bolivia is one of the largest known lithium reserves in the world.

Electric cars have lower environmental impacts then ICE cars, including a significant reduction of air pollution, as they do not emit exhaust pollutants. However, like ICE cars, electric cars emit particulates from tyres. Because EVs typically use regenerative braking, brake wear is much less, often allowing brakes to be excluded from routine maintenance.

Battery manufacturing typically involves greater environmental costs than ICE vehicles, although this is typically offset by the ongoing costs of petroleum production.

Some activists and journalists have raised concerns over the perceived lack of impact of electric cars in solving the climate change crisis compared to other, less popularized methods. These concerns have largely centered around the existence of less carbon-intensive and more efficient forms of transportation such as active mobility, mass transit and e-scooters and the continuation of a system designed for cars first.

== Performance ==
=== Drivetrain ===
Typical "skateboard" layout with the battery as floor and a motor at one or both axles

Electric motors provide high power-to-weight ratios. Electric motors can provide high torque from a standing start. Most EVs use fixed-ratio gearboxes and have no clutch.

Electric cars can achieve faster acceleration than commercial ICE cars, due to reduced drivetrain frictional losses and the motor's uniform torque at low speeds.

Some designs place a motor in each wheel hub or next to the wheels.

Some direct current motor-equipped drag racer EVs have two-speed manual transmissions. The concept electric supercar Rimac Concept One claimed to be able to go from 0–100 km/h (0–62 mph) in 2.5 seconds.

== Energy efficiency ==
Energy efficiency of electric cars in towns and on motorways according to the DoE

Internal combustion engines have thermodynamic limits on efficiency, expressed as the fraction of energy used to propel the vehicle compared to energy produced by burning the fuel. Petrol engines effectively use only 15% of the fuel's energy to move the vehicle or to power accessories; diesel engines can reach on-board efficiency of 20%; electric vehicles convert over 77% of the electrical energy to the wheels. This is partially offset by power required to move the heavy batteries.

Electric motors are more efficient than internal combustion engines in converting energy into propulsion. Some cars with dual motors use one motor for most driving and the second motor for increased power. Regenerative braking, which is most common in electric vehicles, can recover as much as one fifth of the energy normally lost during braking.

=== Cabin heating and cooling ===
ICE cars harness waste heat from the engine to provide cabin heating, while electric vehicles use heat pumps or other technologies to control cabin temperature. PTC junction cooling is used, for example, in the 2008 Tesla Roadster.

Some models heat the cabin while the car is plugged in, such as the Nissan Leaf, the Mitsubishi i-MiEV, Renault Zoe,.

EVs such as the Citroën Berlingo Electrique use an auxiliary heating system such as petrol-fueled units. Cabin cooling can be augmented with solar power external batteries and USB fans or coolers, or by allowing outside air to flow through the car when parked; two models of the 2010 Toyota Prius offer this feature.

== Safety ==
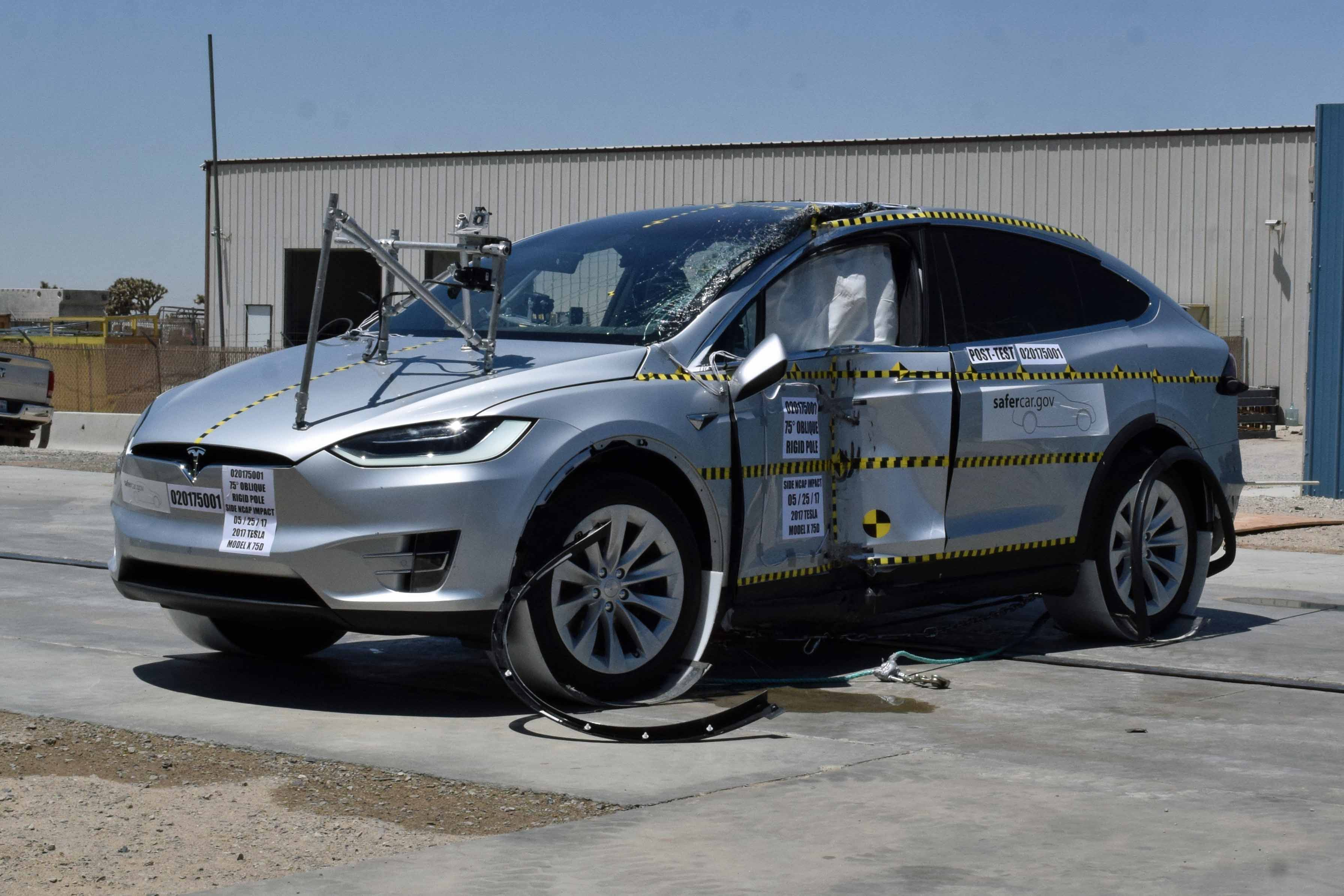
Side impact test of a Tesla Model X

EV safety issues are addressed by international standard ISO 6469. This document is divided into three parts:

- Energy storage, i.e. the battery
- Functional safety and protection against failures
- Electrical hazards

Research published in the British Medical Journal in 2024 reported that between 2013 and 2017 in the United Kingdom, electric cars killed pedestrians at twice the rate of ICE vehicles because "they are less audible to pedestrians in urban areas". Some jurisdictions require EVs to generate sounds when moving.

=== Weight ===
The batteries make EVs heavier than a comparable ICE vehicle. In a collision, the occupants of a heavy vehicle will, on average, suffer fewer and less serious injuries than the occupants of a lighter vehicle; therefore, the additional weight brings safety benefits to the occupant, while increasing harm to others. On average, an accident will cause about 50% more injuries to the occupants of a 2,000 lb (900 kg) vehicle than those in a 3,000 lb (1,400 kg) vehicle. Heavier cars are more dangerous to people outside the car if they hit a pedestrian or another vehicle.

=== Stability ===
The battery in skateboard configuration lowers the center of gravity, increasing driving stability, lowering the risk of an accident through loss of control. Additionally, a lower center of gravity provides a greater resistance to roll-over crashes. If there is a separate motor near or in each wheel, this is claimed to be safer due to better handling.

=== Risk of fire ===
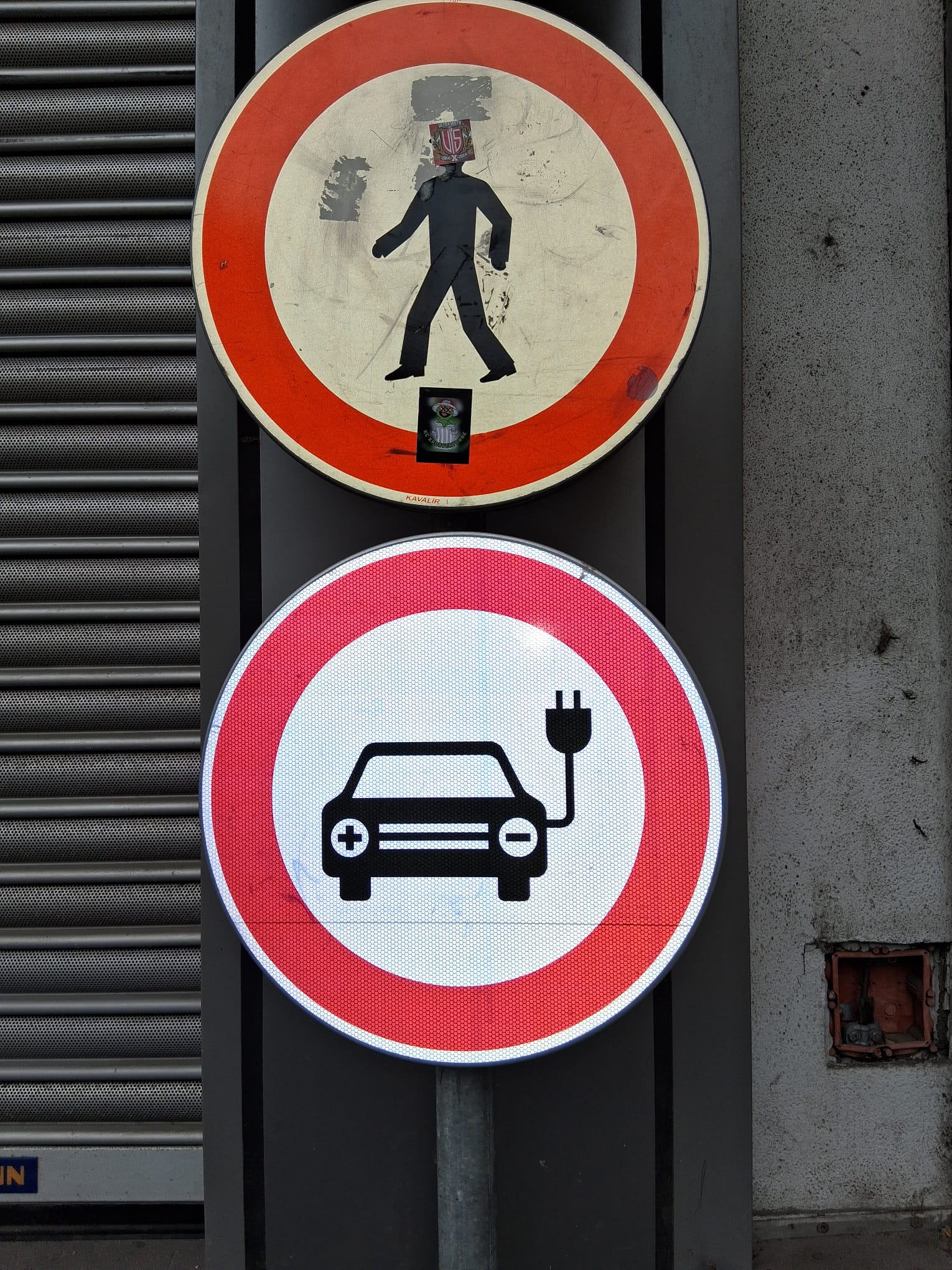
No entry for electric cars (Prague, Czech Republic)

Like their ICE counterparts, electric vehicles can catch fire after a crash or mechanical failure. Plug-in electric vehicle fire incidents have occurred, albeit fewer per distance traveled than ICE vehicles. Some cars' high-voltage systems are designed to shut down automatically in the event of an airbag deployment, and in case of failure firefighters may be trained for manual high-voltage system shutdown. Much more water may be required than for ICE car fires and a thermal imaging camera is recommended to warn of possible re-ignition of battery fires.

== Controls ==
As of 2018, most electric cars have similar driving controls to that of a car with a conventional automatic transmission. Even though the motor may be permanently connected to the wheels through a fixed-ratio gear, and no parking pawl may be present, the modes "P" and "N" are often still provided on the selector. In this case, the motor is disabled in "N" and an electrically actuated hand brake provides the "P" mode.

In some cars, the motor will spin slowly to provide a small amount of creep in "D", similar to a traditional automatic transmission car. In many electric cars the creep mode can be turned off if the owner prefers. This assists one pedal driving where the car can often come to a stop by taking a foot off the gas pedal.

When an internal combustion vehicle's accelerator is released, it may slow by engine braking, depending on the type of transmission and mode. EVs are usually equipped with regenerative braking that slows the vehicle and recharges the battery somewhat. Regenerative braking systems also decrease the use of the conventional brakes (similar to engine braking in an ICE vehicle), reducing brake wear and maintenance costs.

== Batteries ==
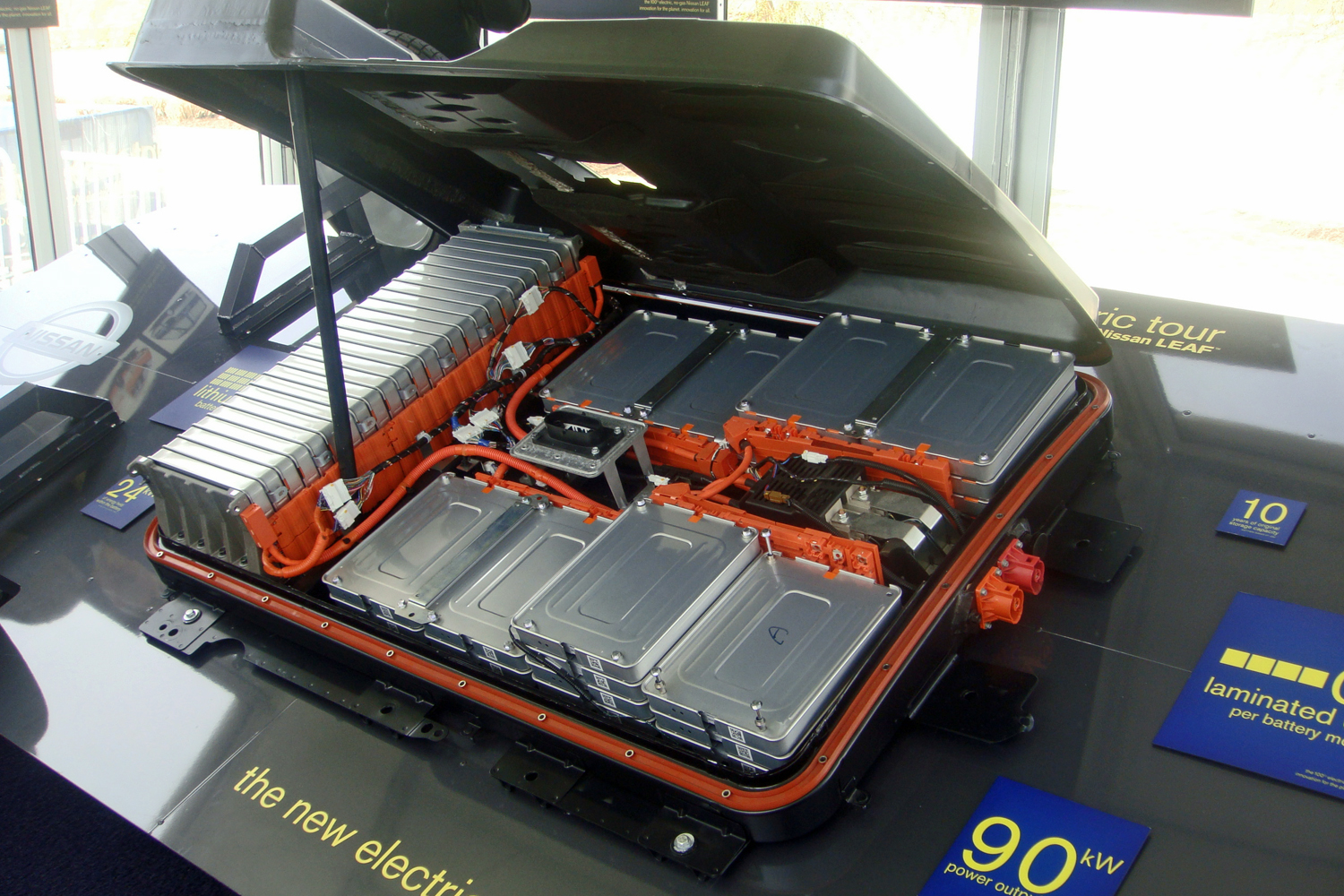
Nissan Leaf battery pack

Lithium-ion-based batteries are often used for their high power and energy density. Batteries with different chemical compositions are becoming more widely used, such as lithium iron phosphate which is not dependent on nickel and cobalt so can be used to make cheaper batteries and thus cheaper cars.

=== Range ===
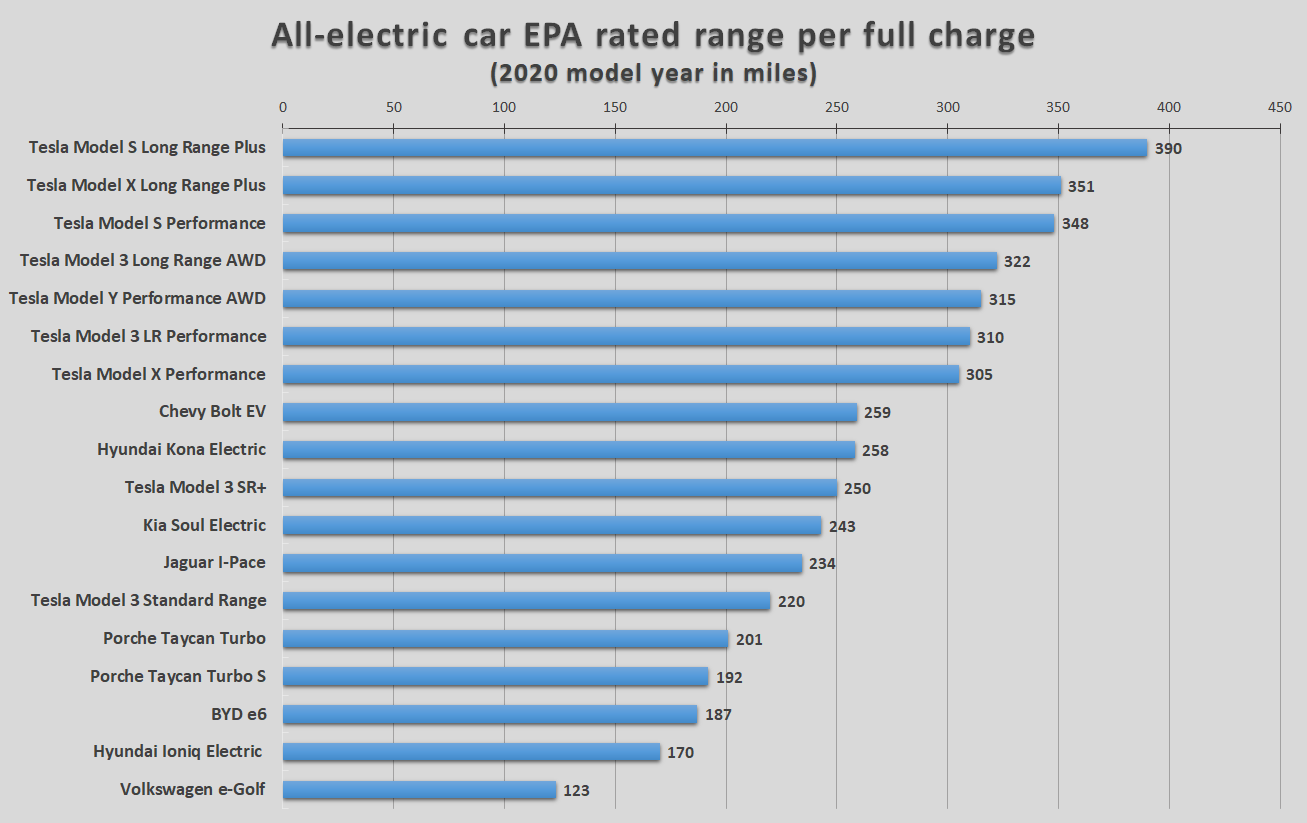
Comparison of EPA-rated range for model year 2020 electric cars rated up until January 2020

The range of an electric car depends on the number and type of batteries used, and (as with all vehicles), the aerodynamics, weight and type of vehicle, performance requirements, and the weather. Cars marketed for mainly city use are often manufactured with a short range battery to keep them small and light.

Most electric cars are fitted with a display of the expected range. This may take into account how the vehicle is being used and what the battery is powering. However, since factors can vary over the route, the estimate can vary from the actual range. The display allows the driver to make informed choices about driving speed and whether to stop at a charging point en route. Some roadside assistance organizations offer charge trucks to recharge electric cars in case of emergency.

=== Charging ===
==== Connectors ====
Most electric cars use a wired connection to supply electricity for recharging. Electric vehicle charging plugs are not universal throughout the world. However vehicles using one type of plug are generally able to charge at other types of charging stations through the use of plug adapters.

The Type 2 connector is the most common type of plug, but different versions are used in China and Europe.

The Type 1 (also called SAE J1772) connector is common in North America but rare elsewhere, as it does not support three-phase charging.

Wireless charging, either for stationary cars or as an electric road, is less common as of 2021, but is used in some cities for taxis.

==== Home charging ====
Electric cars are usually charged overnight from a home charging station; sometimes known as a charging point, wallbox charger, or simply a charger; in a garage or on the outside of a house. As of 2021 typical home chargers are 7 kW, but not all include smart charging. Compared to fossil fuel vehicles, the need for charging using public infrastructure is diminished because of the opportunities for home charging; vehicles can be plugged in and begin each day with a full charge. Charging from a standard outlet is also possible but very slow.

==== Public charging ====
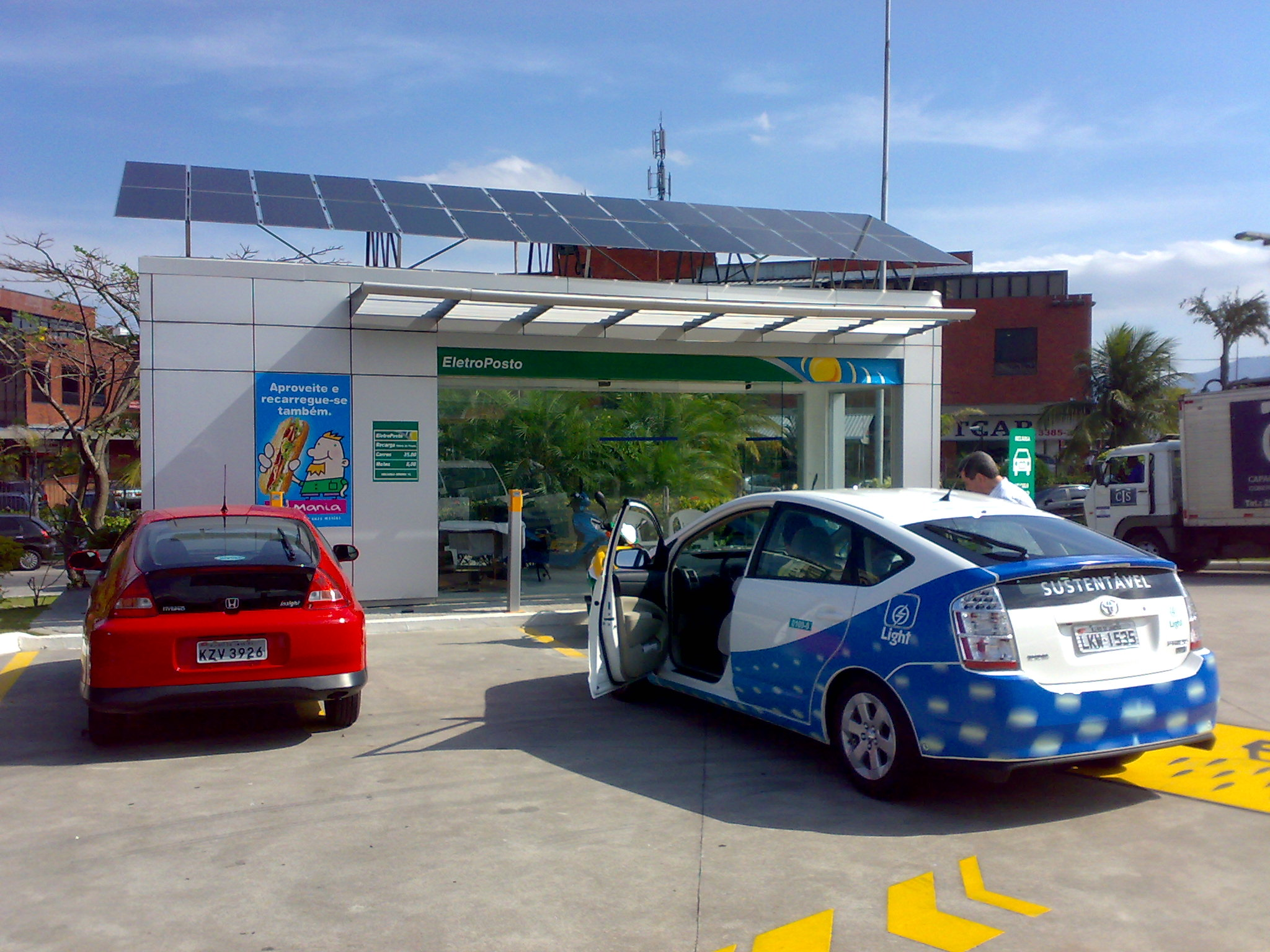
Charging station at Rio de Janeiro, Brazil. This station is run by Petrobras and uses solar energy.

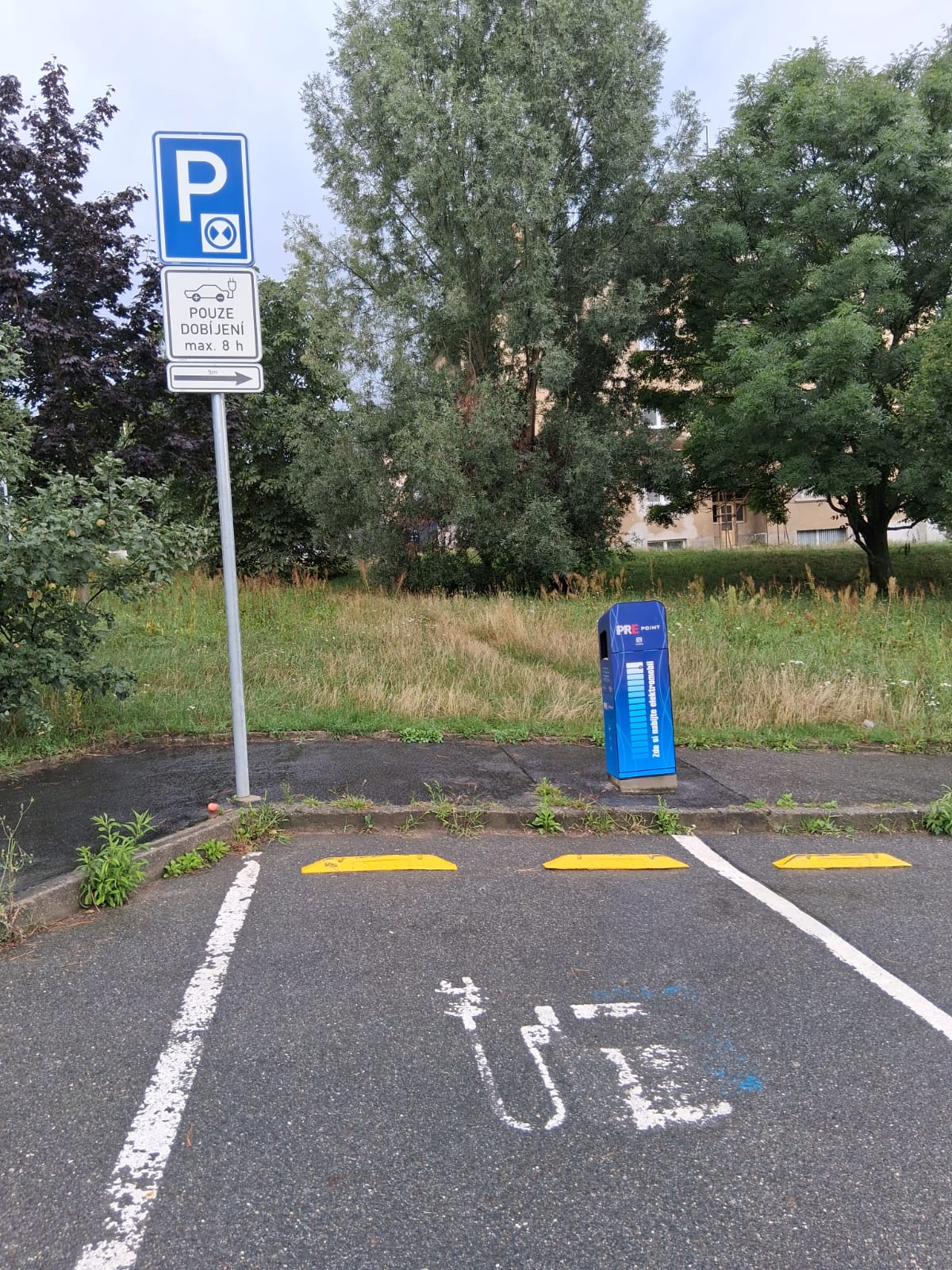
Charging station in Prague, Czech Republic

Some public charging stations are faster than home chargers, with many supplying direct current to avoid the bottleneck of going through the car's AC to DC converter, as of 2021 the fastest being 350 kW.

Combined Charging System (CCS) is the most widespread charging standard, whereas the GB/T 27930 standard is used in China, and CHAdeMO in Japan. The United States has no de facto standard, with a mix of CCS, Tesla Superchargers, and CHAdeMO charging stations.

Charging an electric vehicle using public charging stations takes longer than refueling a fossil fuel vehicle. The speed at which a vehicle can recharge depends on the charging station's charging speed and the vehicle's own capacity to receive a charge. As of 2021 some cars are 400-volt and some 800-volt. Connecting a vehicle that can accommodate very fast charging to a charging station with a very high rate of charge can refill the vehicle's battery to 80% in 15 to 20 minutes.

Vehicles and charging stations with slower charging speeds may take as long as two hours to refill a battery to 80%. As with a mobile phone, the final 20% takes longer because the systems slow down to fill the battery safely and avoid damaging it.

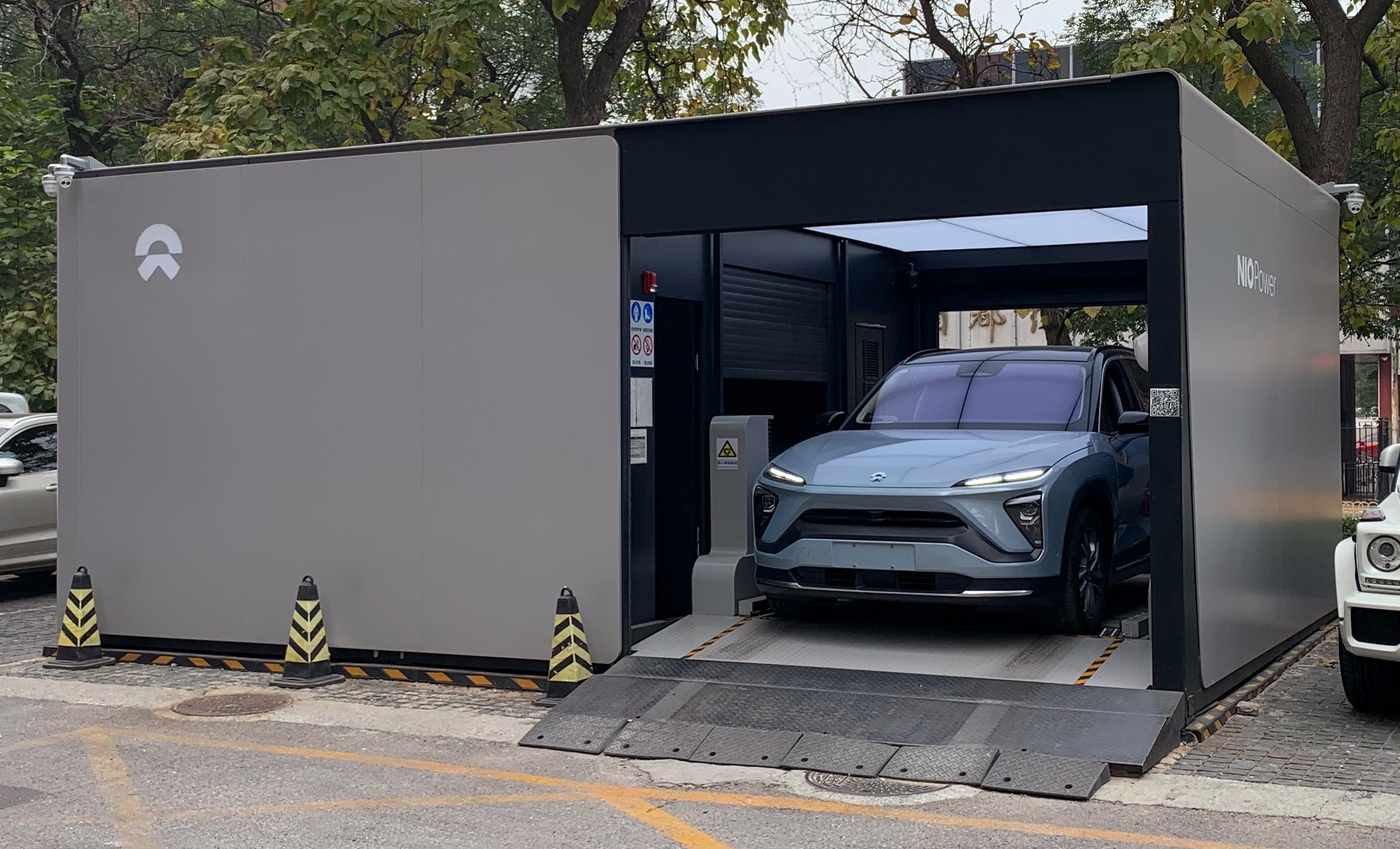
A battery swapping station operated by Nio

Some companies are building battery swapping stations, to substantially reduce the effective time to recharge. Some electric cars (for example, the BMW i3) have an optional petrol range extender. The system is intended as an emergency backup to extend range to the next recharging location, and not for long-distance travel.

==== Vehicle-to-grid: uploading and grid buffering ====
During peak load periods, when the cost of generation can be very high, electric vehicles with vehicle-to-grid capabilities could contribute energy to the grid. These vehicles can then be recharged during off-peak hours at cheaper rates while helping to absorb excess night time generation. The batteries in the vehicles serve as a distributed storage system to buffer power.

A 2022 report from Stanford University questioned the wisdom of charging electric vehicles at night.

=== Lifespan ===
As with all lithium-ion batteries, electric vehicle batteries may degrade over long periods of time, especially if they are frequently charged to 100%; however, this may take at least several years before being noticeable. A typical warranty is 8 years or 100,000 mi (160,000 km), but for non-professional drivers mileage may not be relevant, and the batteries usually last much longer, perhaps 15 to 20 years in the car and then more years in another use.

== Currently available electric cars ==
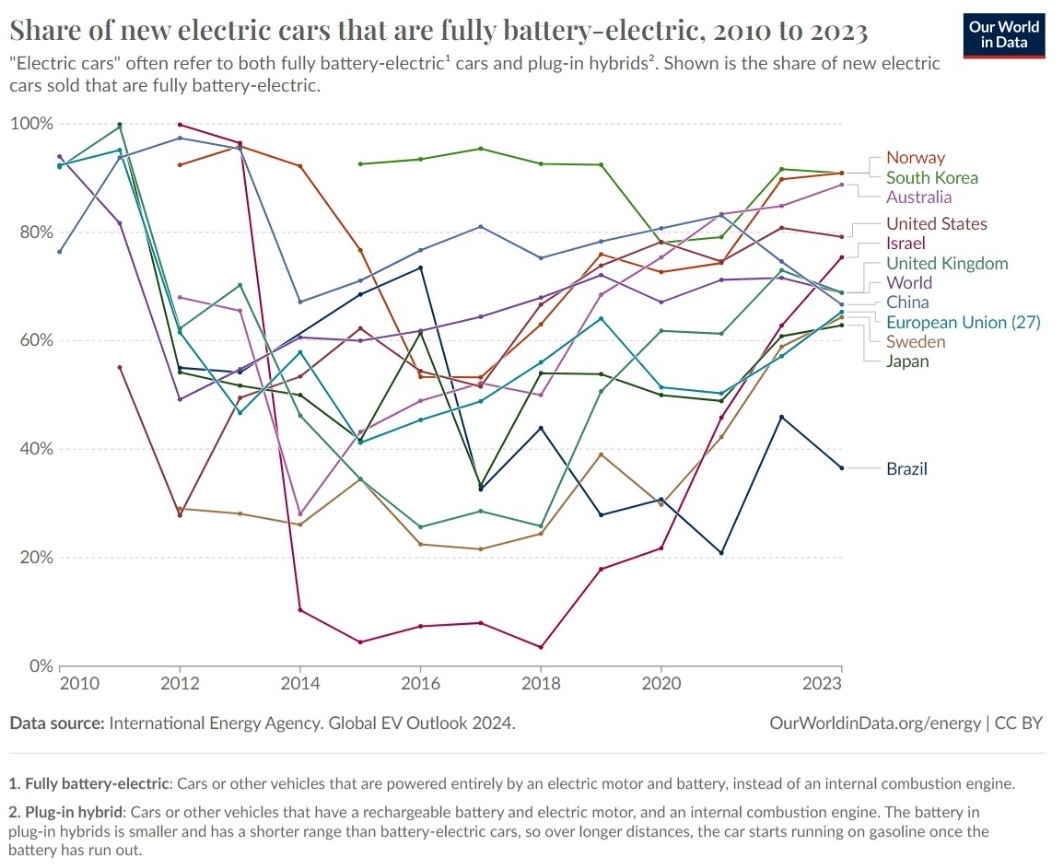
Share of new cars sold that are battery-electric and plug-in hybrid, 2010 to 2023 for selected countries

=== Sales of electric cars ===
Tesla was the world's leading electric vehicle manufacturer from December 2019 to 2023. Its Model S was the world's top selling plug-in electric car in 2015 and 2016, its Model 3 has been the world's best selling plug-in electric car for four consecutive years, from 2018 to 2021, and the Model Y was the top selling plug-in car in 2022. The Tesla Model 3 surpassed the Leaf in early 2020 to become the world's cumulative best selling electric car. Tesla produced its 1 millionth electric car in March 2020, becoming the first auto manufacturer to do so, and in June 2021, the Model 3 became the first electric car to pass 1 million sales. Tesla has been listed as the world's top selling plug-in electric car manufacturer, both as a brand and by automotive group for four years running, from 2018 to 2021. At the end of 2021, Tesla's global cumulative sales since 2012 totaled 2.3 million units, with 936,222 of those delivered in 2021.

BYD Auto is another leading electric vehicle manufacturer, with the majority of its sales coming from China. From 2018 to 2023, BYD produced nearly 3.18 million purely plug-in electric car, with 1,574,822 of those were produced in 2023 alone. In the fourth quarter of 2023, BYD surpassed Tesla as the top-selling electric vehicle manufacturer by selling 526,409 battery electric cars, while Tesla delivered 484,507 vehicles.

As of December 2021, the Renault–Nissan–Mitsubishi Alliance was listed as one of major all-electric vehicle manufacturers, with global all-electric vehicle sales totaling over 1 million light-duty electric vehicles, including those manufactured by Mitsubishi Motors since 2009. Nissan leads global sales within the Alliance, with 1 million cars and vans sold by July 2023, followed by the Groupe Renault with more than 397,000 electric vehicles sold worldwide through December 2020, including its Twizy heavy quadricycle. As of July 2023, global sales totaled over 650,000 units since inception.

Other leading electric vehicles manufacturers are GAC Aion (part of GAC Group, with 962,385 cumulative sales as of December 2023), SAIC Motor with 1,838,000 units (as of July 2023), Geely, and Volkswagen.

The following table lists the all-time best-selling highway-capable all-electric cars with cumulative global sales of over 300,000 units:

All-time top-selling highway-capable^{(1)} all-electric passenger car nameplates
Company	Model	Image	Market launch	Lifetime global sales	Total sales through	Annual global sales	Status	Ref
Tesla, Inc.	Tesla Model Y		2020-03	3,393,136	2024-09	1,200,000 (2024, estimate)	In production	
Tesla, Inc.	Tesla Model 3		2017-07	2,627,871	2024-09	500,000 (2024, estimate)	In production	
SAIC-GM-Wuling	Wuling Hongguang Mini EV		2020-07	1,862,636	2025-12	261,141 (2024)	In production	
BYD	BYD Seagull		2023-04	1,204,800	2025-12	479,294 (2024)	In production	
BYD	BYD Yuan Plus / Atto 3		2022-02	1,147,702	2025-12	309,536 (2024)	In production	
BYD	BYD Dolphin		2021-08	1,050,040	2025-12	198,320 (2024)	In production	
Volkswagen	Volkswagen ID.4		2020-09	~901,000	2025-02	192,686 (2023)	In production	
Nissan	Nissan Leaf		2010-12	~650,000	2023-07	64,201 (2021)	In production	
Volkswagen	Volkswagen ID.3		2019-11	~628,000	2025-02	139,268 (2023)	In production	
GAC Group	Aion S		2019-05	608,162	2024-12	122,793 (2024)	In production	
BYD	BYD Qin EV		2016-03	596,487	2024-12	142,330 (2024)	In production	
GAC Group	Aion Y		2021-04	528,502	2024-12	145,152 (2024)	In production	
Changan Automobile	Changan Lumin		2022-04	521,903	2025-12	141,246 (2024)	In production	
Geely	Geely Xingyuan		2024-09	~468,000	2025-12	468,242 (2024)	In production	
BYD	BYD Han EV		2020-03	456,306	2024-12	89,177 (2024)	In production	
Wuling	Wuling Binguo		2023-02	425,033	2024-12	191,298 (2024)	In production	
Renault	Renault Zoe		2012-12	413,975	2023-06	15,706 (2023)	Ceased production	
Hyundai	Hyundai Kona Electric		2018-05	382,271	2024-12	52,628 (2024)	In production	
Hyundai	Hyundai Ioniq 5		2021-03	373,826	2024-12	93,396 (2024)	In production	
Chery	Chery eQ1		2017-03	368,361	2024-12	30,310 (2024)	In production	
Tesla, Inc.	Tesla Model S		2012-06	~363,900	2022-12	~35,000 (2022)	Ceased production	
Notes: (1) Vehicles are considered highway-capable if able to achieve at least a top speed of 100 km/h (62 mph).

=== Electric cars by country ===
In 2025, the total number of electric cars on the world's roads was about 75 million. Sales of electric cars in 2025 increased to 21 million. China has the largest electric car fleet in use, with 44 million in 2025, more than half (58.9%) of the world's electric car stock.

All-electric cars have oversold plug-in hybrids since 2012.

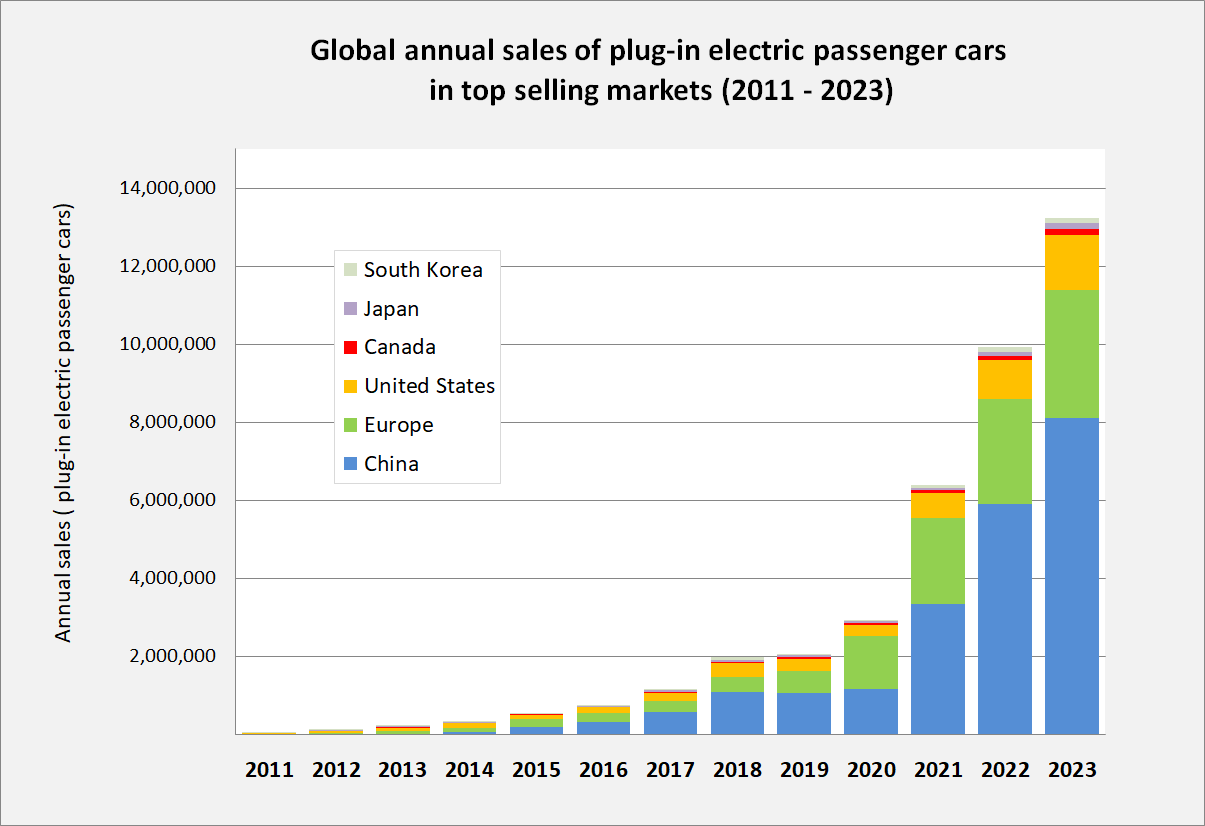
Annual sales of plug-in electric passenger cars in the world's top markets between 2011 and 2023

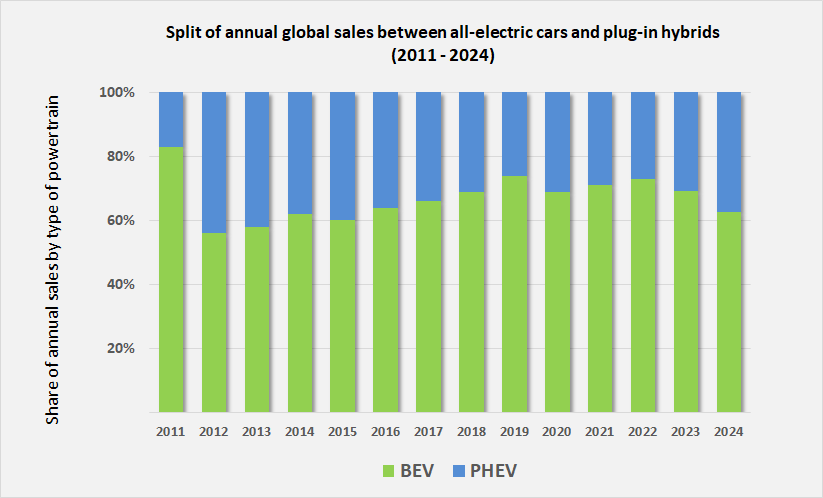
Evolution of the ratio between global sales of BEVs and PHEVs between 2011 and 2024

Global electric vehicle sales from 2015 to 2024

== Public opinion ==
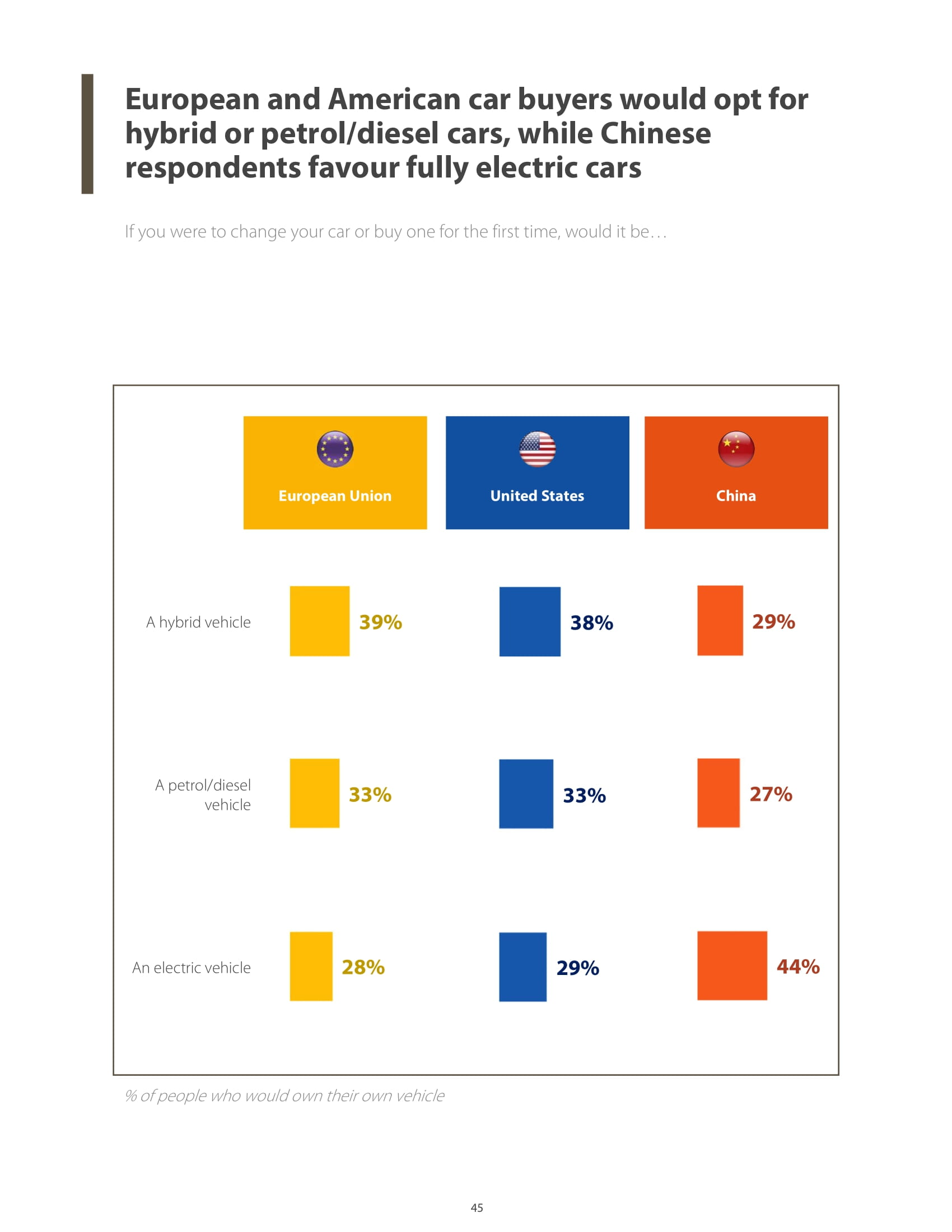
A 2022 climate survey highlighting European, American, and Chinese car buying preferences

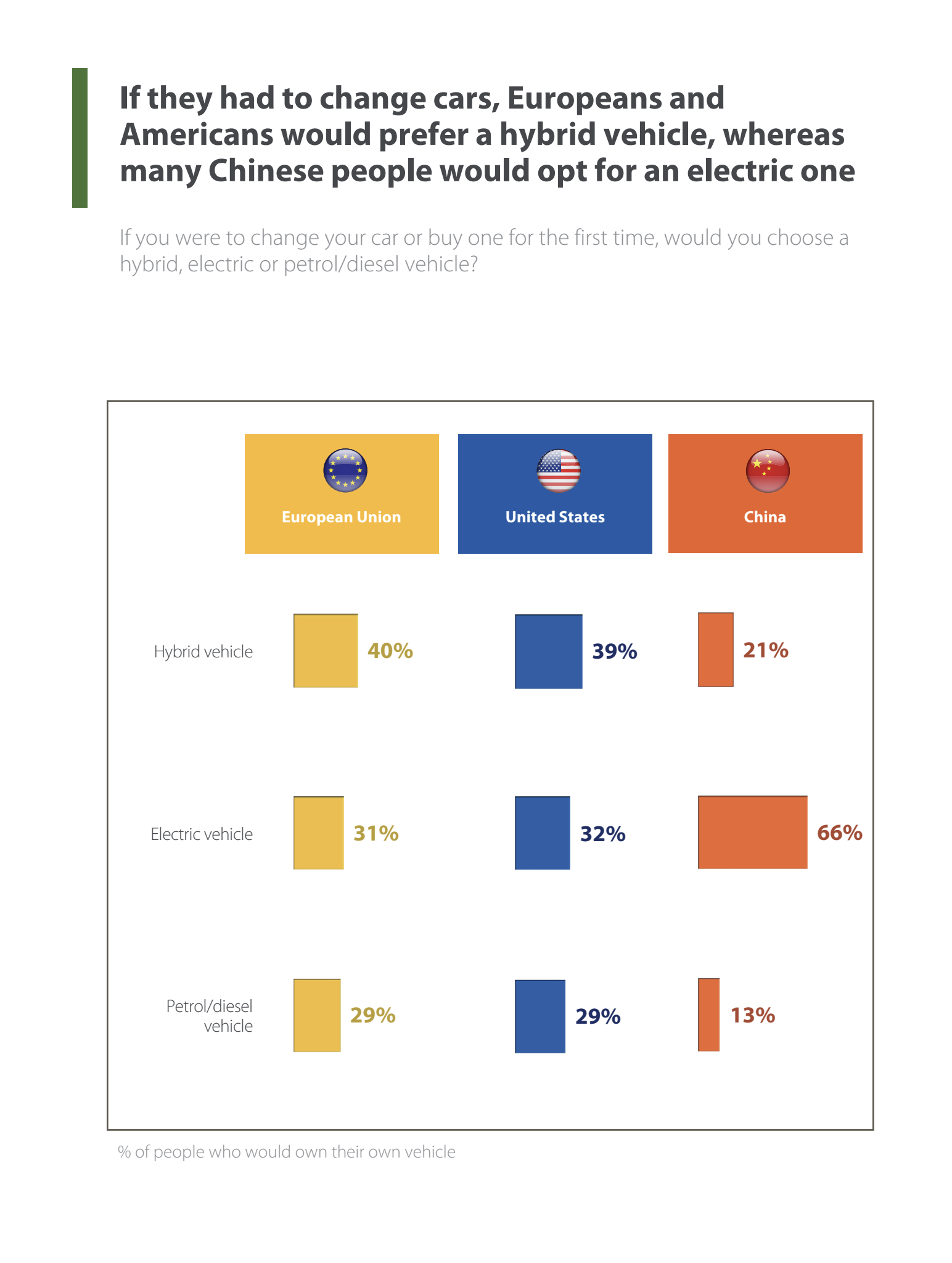
The same survey showing that if the respondents had to change cars, Chinese respondents are more likely to opt for an electric one

A 2022 survey found that 33% of car buyers in Europe will opt for a petrol or diesel car when purchasing a new vehicle. 67% of the respondents mentioned opting for the hybrid or electric version. More specifically, it found that electric cars are only preferred by 28% of Europeans, making them the least preferred type of vehicle. 39% of Europeans tend to prefer hybrid vehicles, while 33% prefer petrol or diesel vehicles.

Chinese car buyers, are the most likely to buy an electric car at 44%. 38% of Americans would opt for a hybrid car, 33% would prefer petrol or diesel, while only 29% would go for an electric car.

In the EU, 47% of car buyers 65 years or older are likely to purchase a hybrid vehicle. 31% of younger respondents do not consider hybrid vehicles a good option. 35% of younger respondents would rather opt for a petrol or diesel vehicle, and 24% for an electric car instead of a hybrid.

In the EU, 13% of the population do not plan on owning a vehicle at all.

In a 2023 survey concentrated specifically on electric car ownership in the US, 50% of respondents planning to purchase a future car considered themselves unlikely to seriously consider buying an EV. The survey also found that support for banning the production of non-electric vehicles in the US by 2035 has declined from 47% to 40%.

Tension between electric vehicles owners and traditional petrol vehicle owners have also influenced public perception. Surveys were taken by the market research firm Ipsos in which they found that belief in EV's environmental benefits among Americans has declined from 63% to 58% over two years. Skepticism has risen mainly among those not considering an EV, who are becoming more united in the belief that EVs are not better for the environment. Cultural divides have contributed to the hostility, with EVs often being associated with coastal, urban elites. Misinformation about battery production, tire emissions, and electricity sources has further created negative attitudes among ICE car supporters.

Public perception of electric vehicles varies across different countries and regions even though there is an overall increase in EV interest worldwide. In Europe, environmental concerns are forcing EV adoption, while in the U.S., cost and range anxiety are major barriers and challenges to the purchasing of EVs. In China, government incentives and infrastructure growth have contributed to higher consumer confidence in EVs. The growing awareness of environmental benefits and government support are influencing public attitudes globally. This is gradually increasing the EV adoption rate. Norway is leading the way in EV adoption and consumers are taking advantage of the tax rebate for electric vehicle purchases. 9 of 10 cars sold in Norway are electric due to this generous government incentive and Norway's wide spread charging infrastructure.

== Government policies and incentives ==
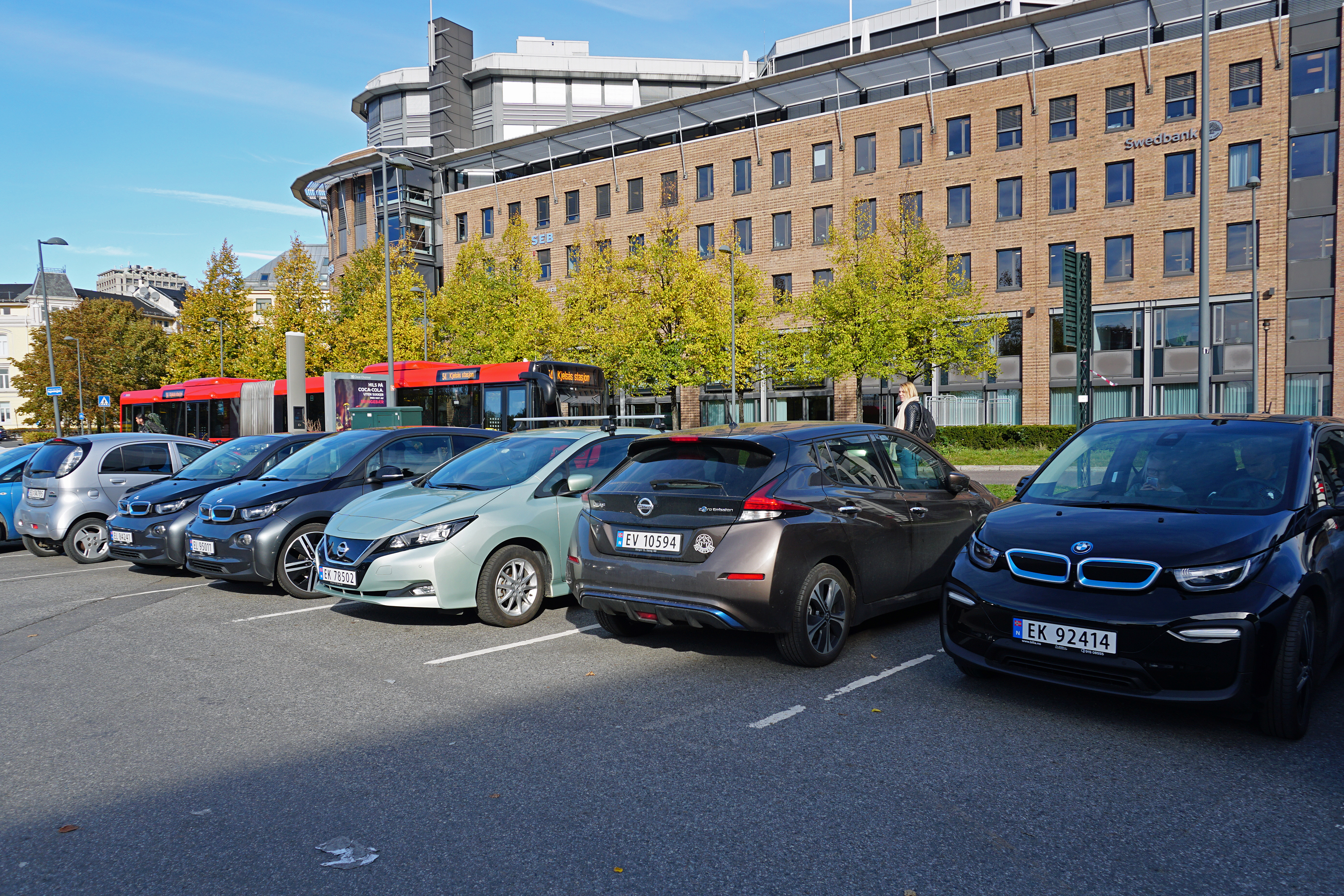
A dedicated electric car free charging and parking lot in Oslo

Four out of ten Europeans interviewed for the European Investment Bank climate survey thought subsidies for electric cars should be a priority to fight climate change.

Several national, provincial, and local governments around the world have introduced policies to support the mass-market adoption of plug-in electric vehicles. A variety of policies have been established to provide: financial support to consumers and manufacturers; non-monetary incentives; subsidies for the deployment of charging infrastructure; electric vehicle charging stations in buildings; and long-term regulations with specific targets.

Timeline of national targets for full ICE phase out or 100% ZEV car sales
Selected countries	Year
Norway (100% ZEV sales)	2025
Denmark	2030
Iceland	2030
Ireland	2030
Netherlands (100% ZEV sales)	2030
Sweden	2030
United Kingdom (100% ZEV sales)	2035
France	2040
Canada (100% ZEV sales)	2040
Singapore	2040
Germany (100% ZEV sales)	2050
U.S. (10 ZEV states)	2050
Japan (100% HEV–PHEV–ZEV sales)	2050

Financial incentives for consumers are aiming to make electric car purchase price competitive with conventional cars due to the higher upfront cost of electric vehicles. Depending on battery size, there are one-time purchase incentives such as grants and tax credits; exemptions from import duties; exemptions from road tolls and congestion charges; and exemption of registration and annual fees.

Among the non-monetary incentives, there are several perks such allowing plug-in vehicles access to bus lanes and high-occupancy vehicle lanes, free parking and free charging. Some countries or cities that restrict private car ownership (for example, a purchase quota system for new vehicles), or have implemented permanent driving restrictions (for example, no-drive days), have these schemes exclude electric vehicles to promote their adoption. Several countries, including England and India, are introducing regulations that require electric vehicle charging stations in certain buildings.

Some government have also established long term regulatory signals with specific targets such as zero-emissions vehicle (ZEV) mandates, national or regional CO_{2} emission regulations, stringent fuel economy standards, and the phase out of internal combustion engine vehicle sales. For example, Norway set a national goal that by 2025 all new car sales should be ZEVs (battery electric or hydrogen). While these incentives aim to facilitate a quicker transition from internal combustion cars, they have been criticized by some economists for creating excess deadweight loss in the electric car market, which may partially counteract environmental gains.

Some experts have criticized the government incentivization of private electric cars. Transport researchers Israel Fabian and Dick Ettema have found that while government incentives can assist in lowering overall Greenhouse gas emissions, such incentives lead to unequal distribution of resources which can lead to social exclusion and transportation burdens on certain populations.

== Geopolitics ==
The emergence of China as the dominant force in the EV manufacturing sector has made the EV industry a theater of geopolitical strategy and trade friction. China's competitive position, built on vertical integration and overwhelming scale, has led the European Union and the U.S. to implement protective trade measures citing a variety of reasons, such as dumping, state subsidies, production overcapacity, national security, and forced labor. Critics argue that such allegations are a justification for protectionism.

China's competitive advantage is the culmination of a decades-long industrial policy aimed at seizing global leadership in the EV sector. While Western and Japanese automakers primarily focused on refining internal combustion engines, Chinese policymakers focused on EVs with a systematic approach prioritizing technological independence, manufacturing scale, and demand creation. The resulting economies of scale and supply chain advantages allow Chinese manufacturers to offer EVs at a lower cost, putting pressure on established manufacturers.

The export of Chinese EVs has created intense market pressure in Europe and North America, leading to a wave of protectionist measures aimed at shielding domestic industries. The European Commission, following a vote by EU member states on 4 October 2024, to impose definitive countervailing duties (CVDs) on imports of Chinese-manufactured battery electric vehicles. These duties are set to apply by 30 October 2024. These tariffs were levied in response to the competitive distortions alleged to stem from substantial Chinese state subsidies, which are viewed by the EU as potentially violating World Trade Organization (WTO) rules. China launched a WTO complaint in response.

During the first presidency of Donald Trump, the U.S. imposed a stiff 27.5 percent tariff for Chinese-made cars. In May 2024, the U.S. imposed a higher 100% import tariff on Chinese EVs, designed to effectively block Chinese EV imports from significantly impacting the domestic US market. In August 2024 Canada followed the U.S. by announcing a 100% tariff on imported Chinese electric vehicles, although in 2025 Canada replaced this tariff with a quota following a bilateral agreement with China. As exports to North America and Europe are less profitable, Chinese manufacturers are aggressively focusing their expansion efforts on regions with fewer regulatory hurdles and soaring demand. The manufacturers recalibrated its strategy towards price-sensitive markets like Southeast Asia and Latin America.

== Forecasts ==
Total global EV sales in 2030 were predicted to reach 31.1 million by Deloitte. The International Energy Agency predicted that the total global stock of EVs would reach almost 145 million by 2030 under current policies, or 230 million if Sustainable Development policies were adopted.

As of 2024 over 700 million people don’t have electricity, mostly in sub-Saharan Africa. The World Bank and the African Development Bank plan to provide access to electricity to 300 million people in that region by 2030. At this time, there are just over 20,000 electric vehicles and less than 1,000 charging stations in Africa. However, EV manufacturers have already built or are planning to build production plants in 21 African countries.

== See also ==
- Electric vehicle
  - Battery electric vehicle
  - Plug-in electric vehicle
  - Plug-in hybrid electric vehicle
  - Electric bus
  - Electric rickshaw
- Solar car
- Electric car energy efficiency
- Electric motorcycles and scooters
- Electric vehicle warning sounds – vehicle sounds for pedestrian safety
- Electric motorsport
- Eco Grand Prix
- Formula E
- List of electric cars currently available
- Vehicle-to-everything (V2X)
- Phase-out of fossil fuel vehicles
- Personal electric vehicle (PEV)
