= Flocken =

Flocken may refer to:

== People ==
- Andreas Flocken (1845-1913), German entrepreneur and inventor

== Media ==
- Flocking (film), film (Swedish: Flocken)
