= Flocken Elektrowagen =

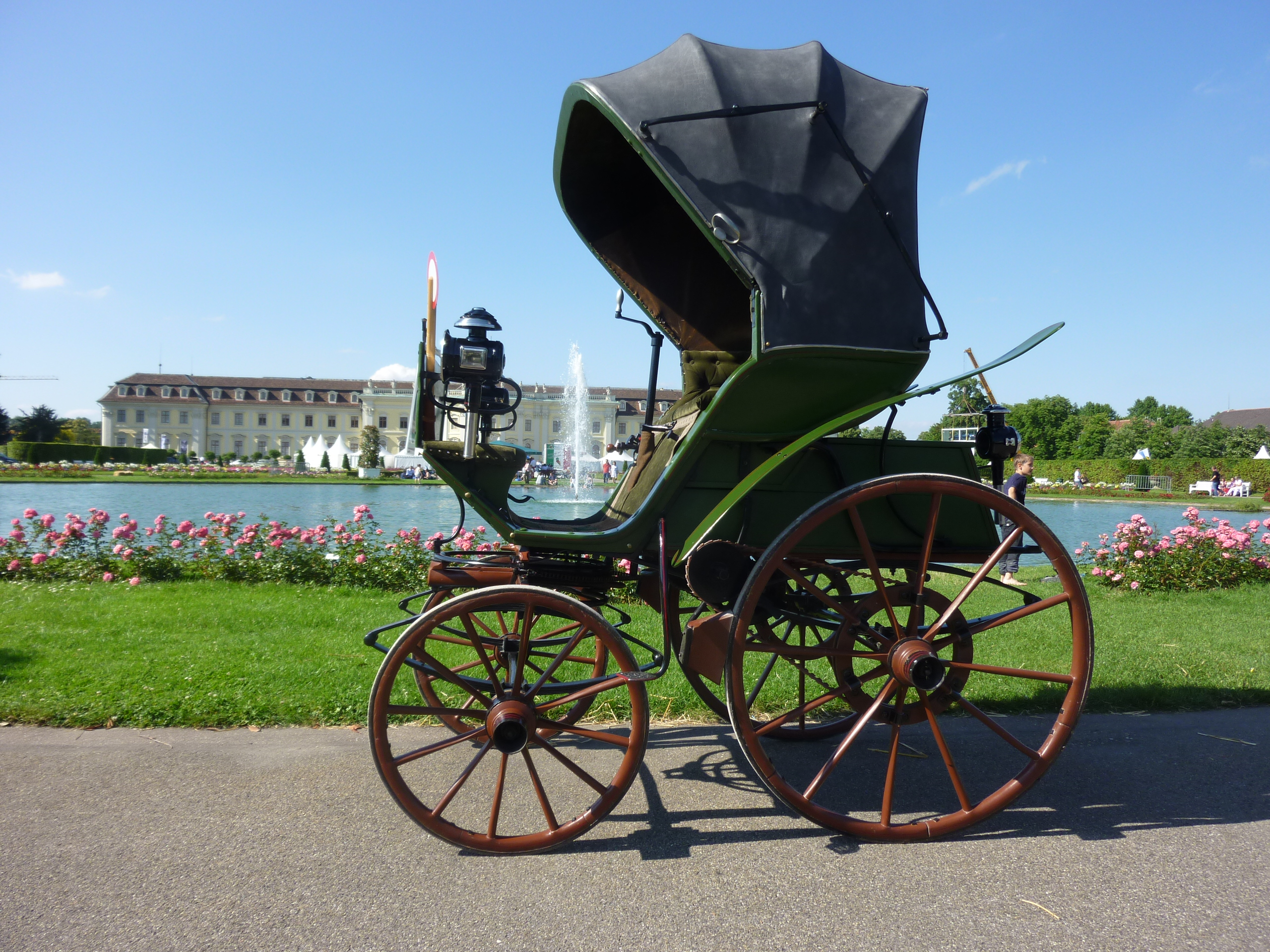

Overview
- Manufacturer: Maschinenfabrik A. Flocken
- Production: 1888

The Flocken Elektrowagen is a four-wheeled electric car designed by German entrepreneur and inventor Andreas Flocken (1845–1913), manufactured in 1888 by Maschinenfabrik A. Flocken in Coburg. It is regarded as the first electric production car.

== History ==
In 1888, Flocken added a department for electrical engineering to his company Maschinenfabrik A. Flocken in Coburg and from then on experimented with electric vehicles. In the same year, the first Flocken electric car was built. This vehicle was originally a chaise, similar to the Daimler Motorized Carriage in 1886 by Gottlieb Daimler, but it was equipped with an electric motor. Little is known about Flocken's development work. In 1888, he provided a high-wheeled, iron-tyred carriage wagon (high center of gravity, narrow track width, turntable steering, etc.) with an electric motor, the power of about 0.9 kW (1 hp) of which was transferred to the rear axle by means of leather belts. The wooden vehicle is said to have reached a top speed of 15 km/h (9 mph) and weighed 400 kg (882 lb).

In the following years, further models were developed. For example, there is a photo of a two-seater from around 1903 in the Deutsches Museum. This model had a stub axle steering, spoked wheels with pneumatic tires of the same size with ball bearings and fully elliptical springs and a battery box over the front axle. The tie rod was moved down and had a control handle. In addition, the vehicle had electric headlights, which is considered a possible novelty.

Vehicle construction at Flocken was discontinued in 1903.
