= Electric car EPA fuel economy =

Table of electric car efficiency data

The following table compares official EPA ratings for fuel economy (in miles per gallon gasoline equivalent, mpg-e or MPGe, for plug-in electric vehicles) for series production all-electric passenger vehicles rated by the EPA for model years 2015, 2016, 2017, and 2023 versus the model year 2016 vehicles that were rated the most efficient by the EPA with plug-in hybrid drivetrains (Chevrolet Volt – second generation), gasoline-electric hybrid drivetrains (Toyota Prius Eco - fourth generation), and the average new vehicle for that model year, which has a fuel economy of 25 mpg_{‑US} (9.4 L/100 km; 30 mpg_{‑imp}).

EPA rating data are taken from manufacturer testing of their own vehicles using a series of tests specified by federal law. Manufacturers usually conduct the tests using pre-production prototypes. Manufacturers report the results to EPA. The EPA then reviews the results and selects about 15%–20% of them to confirm through their own tests at the National Vehicles and Fuel Emissions Laboratory.

Real-world EV efficiency can also be expressed in miles per kilowatt-hour (mi/kWh), which converts EPA MPGe values into direct electrical energy consumption, allowing cross-comparison between electric and gasoline vehicles.

Comparison of top fuel efficient battery-electric vehicles versus most efficient fossil fuel vehicles (including hybrid-electric vehicles) (Fuel economy as displayed in the Monroney label)
Vehicle	Model year	EPA rated fuel economy			Notes
Vehicle	Model year	Combined	City	Highway	Notes
Toyota Prius HEV	2023	57 mpg	57 mpg	56 mpg	(9)
Hyundai Ioniq 6 Long Range RWD w/ 18-inch wheels	2023	140 mpg‑e 24.1 kWh/100 mi; 15.0 kWh/100 km	153 mpg‑e 22.0 kWh/100 mi; 13.7 kWh/100 km	127 mpg‑e 26.5 kWh/100 mi; 16.5 kWh/100 km	(1)
Lucid Air Pure AWD w/ 19-inch wheels	2023	140 mpg‑e 24.1 kWh/100 mi; 15.0 kWh/100 km	141 mpg‑e 23.9 kWh/100 mi; 14.9 kWh/100 km	140 mpg‑e 24.1 kWh/100 mi; 15.0 kWh/100 km	(1)
Tesla Model Y AWD	2023	123 mpg‑e 27.4 kWh/100 mi; 17.0 kWh/100 km	129 mpg‑e 26.1 kWh/100 mi; 16.2 kWh/100 km	116 mpg‑e 29.1 kWh/100 mi; 18.1 kWh/100 km	(1)
Tesla Model 3 Standard Range	2020	141 mpg‑e 23.9 kWh/100 mi; 14.9 kWh/100 km	148 mpg‑e 22.8 kWh/100 mi; 14.2 kWh/100 km	132 mpg‑e 25.5 kWh/100 mi; 15.9 kWh/100 km	(1)
Hyundai Ioniq Electric	2017	136 mpg‑e 24.8 kWh/100 mi; 15.4 kWh/100 km	150 mpg‑e 22.5 kWh/100 mi; 14.0 kWh/100 km	122 mpg‑e 27.6 kWh/100 mi; 17.2 kWh/100 km	(1) (4)
BMW i3 (60 A·h)	2014/15/16	124 mpg‑e 27.2 kWh/100 mi; 16.9 kWh/100 km	137 mpg‑e 24.6 kWh/100 mi; 15.3 kWh/100 km	111 mpg‑e 30.4 kWh/100 mi; 18.9 kWh/100 km	(1) (3) (4) (5)
Scion iQ EV	2013	121 mpg‑e 27.9 kWh/100 mi; 17.3 kWh/100 km	138 mpg‑e 24.4 kWh/100 mi; 15.2 kWh/100 km	105 mpg‑e 32.1 kWh/100 mi; 19.9 kWh/100 km	(1)
Tesla Model 3 Long Range AWD	2020	121 mpg‑e 27.9 kWh/100 mi; 17.3 kWh/100 km	124 mpg‑e 27.2 kWh/100 mi; 16.9 kWh/100 km	116 mpg‑e 29.1 kWh/100 mi; 18.1 kWh/100 km	(1)
Chevrolet Bolt EV	2017	119 mpg‑e 28.3 kWh/100 mi; 17.6 kWh/100 km	121 mpg‑e 27.9 kWh/100 mi; 17.3 kWh/100 km	110 mpg‑e 30.6 kWh/100 mi; 19.0 kWh/100 km	
Chevrolet Spark EV	2014/15/16	119 mpg‑e 28.3 kWh/100 mi; 17.6 kWh/100 km	128 mpg‑e 26.3 kWh/100 mi; 16.4 kWh/100 km	109 mpg‑e 30.9 kWh/100 mi; 19.2 kWh/100 km	(1)
BMW i3 (94 A·h)	2017	118 mpg‑e 28.6 kWh/100 mi; 17.7 kWh/100 km	129 mpg‑e 26.1 kWh/100 mi; 16.2 kWh/100 km	106 mpg‑e 31.8 kWh/100 mi; 19.8 kWh/100 km	(1)
Honda Fit EV	2013/14	118 mpg‑e 28.6 kWh/100 mi; 17.7 kWh/100 km	132 mpg‑e 25.5 kWh/100 mi; 15.9 kWh/100 km	105 mpg‑e 32.1 kWh/100 mi; 19.9 kWh/100 km	(1)
Fiat 500e	2013/14/15	116 mpg‑e 29.1 kWh/100 mi; 18.1 kWh/100 km	122 mpg‑e 27.6 kWh/100 mi; 17.2 kWh/100 km	108 mpg‑e 31.2 kWh/100 mi; 19.4 kWh/100 km	(1)
Volkswagen e-Golf	2015/16	116 mpg‑e 29.1 kWh/100 mi; 18.1 kWh/100 km	126 mpg‑e 26.8 kWh/100 mi; 16.6 kWh/100 km	105 mpg‑e 32.1 kWh/100 mi; 19.9 kWh/100 km	(1)
Nissan Leaf (24 kW-h)	2013/14/15/16	114 mpg‑e 29.6 kWh/100 mi; 18.4 kWh/100 km	126 mpg‑e 26.8 kWh/100 mi; 16.6 kWh/100 km	101 mpg‑e 33.4 kWh/100 mi; 20.7 kWh/100 km	(1) (6)
Mitsubishi i	2012/13/14/16	112 mpg‑e 30.1 kWh/100 mi; 18.7 kWh/100 km	126 mpg‑e 26.8 kWh/100 mi; 16.6 kWh/100 km	99 mpg‑e 34.0 kWh/100 mi; 21.2 kWh/100 km	(1)
Nissan Leaf (30 kW-h)	2016	112 mpg‑e 30.1 kWh/100 mi; 18.7 kWh/100 km	124 mpg‑e 27.2 kWh/100 mi; 16.9 kWh/100 km	101 mpg‑e 33.4 kWh/100 mi; 20.7 kWh/100 km	(1)
Fiat 500e	2016	112 mpg‑e 30.1 kWh/100 mi; 18.7 kWh/100 km	121 mpg‑e 27.9 kWh/100 mi; 17.3 kWh/100 km	103 mpg‑e 32.7 kWh/100 mi; 20.3 kWh/100 km	(1)
Smart electric drive	2013/14/15/16	107 mpg‑e 31.5 kWh/100 mi; 19.6 kWh/100 km	122 mpg‑e 27.6 kWh/100 mi; 17.2 kWh/100 km	93 mpg‑e 36.2 kWh/100 mi; 22.5 kWh/100 km	(1) (7)
Kia Soul EV	2015/16	105 mpg‑e 32.1 kWh/100 mi; 19.9 kWh/100 km	120 mpg‑e 28.1 kWh/100 mi; 17.5 kWh/100 km	92 mpg‑e 36.6 kWh/100 mi; 22.8 kWh/100 km	(1)
Ford Focus Electric	2012/13/14/15/16	105 mpg‑e 32.1 kWh/100 mi; 19.9 kWh/100 km	110 mpg‑e 30.6 kWh/100 mi; 19.0 kWh/100 km	99 mpg‑e 34.0 kWh/100 mi; 21.2 kWh/100 km	(1)
Tesla Model S AWD - 70D	2015/16	101 mpg‑e 33.4 kWh/100 mi; 20.7 kWh/100 km	101 mpg‑e 33.4 kWh/100 mi; 20.7 kWh/100 km	102 mpg‑e 33.0 kWh/100 mi; 20.5 kWh/100 km	(1)
Tesla Model S AWD - 85D & 90D	2015/16	100 mpg‑e 33.7 kWh/100 mi; 20.9 kWh/100 km	95 mpg‑e 35.5 kWh/100 mi; 22.0 kWh/100 km	106 mpg‑e 31.8 kWh/100 mi; 19.8 kWh/100 km	(1) (8)
Tesla Model S (60 kW·h)	2014/15/16	95 mpg‑e 35.5 kWh/100 mi; 22.0 kWh/100 km	94 mpg‑e 35.9 kWh/100 mi; 22.3 kWh/100 km	97 mpg‑e 34.7 kWh/100 mi; 21.6 kWh/100 km	(1)
Tesla Model S AWD - P85D & P90D	2015/16	93 mpg‑e 36.2 kWh/100 mi; 22.5 kWh/100 km	89 mpg‑e 37.9 kWh/100 mi; 23.5 kWh/100 km	98 mpg‑e 34.4 kWh/100 mi; 21.4 kWh/100 km	(1) (8)
Tesla Model X AWD – 90D	2016	92 mpg‑e 36.6 kWh/100 mi; 22.8 kWh/100 km	90 mpg‑e 37.5 kWh/100 mi; 23.3 kWh/100 km	94 mpg‑e 35.9 kWh/100 mi; 22.3 kWh/100 km	(1)
Tesla Model X AWD – P90D	2016	89 mpg‑e 37.9 kWh/100 mi; 23.5 kWh/100 km	89 mpg‑e 37.9 kWh/100 mi; 23.5 kWh/100 km	90 mpg‑e 37.5 kWh/100 mi; 23.3 kWh/100 km	(1)
Tesla Model S (85 kW·h)	2012/13/14/15	89 mpg‑e 37.9 kWh/100 mi; 23.5 kWh/100 km	88 mpg‑e 38.3 kWh/100 mi; 23.8 kWh/100 km	90 mpg‑e 37.5 kWh/100 mi; 23.3 kWh/100 km	(1)
Mercedes-Benz B-Class Electric Drive	2014/15/16	84 mpg‑e 40.1 kWh/100 mi; 24.9 kWh/100 km	85 mpg‑e 39.7 kWh/100 mi; 24.6 kWh/100 km	83 mpg‑e 40.6 kWh/100 mi; 25.2 kWh/100 km	(1)
Toyota RAV4 EV	2012/13/14	76 mpg‑e 44.3 kWh/100 mi; 27.6 kWh/100 km	78 mpg‑e 43.2 kWh/100 mi; 26.9 kWh/100 km	74 mpg‑e 45.5 kWh/100 mi; 28.3 kWh/100 km	(1)
BYD e6	2012/13/14/15/16	63 mpg‑e 53.5 kWh/100 mi; 33.2 kWh/100 km	61 mpg‑e 55.3 kWh/100 mi; 34.3 kWh/100 km	65 mpg‑e 51.9 kWh/100 mi; 32.2 kWh/100 km	(1)
Second gen Chevrolet Volt; Plug-in hybrid (PHEV); Electricity only	2016	106 mpg‑e 31.8 kWh/100 mi; 19.8 kWh/100 km	113 mpg‑e 29.8 kWh/100 mi; 18.5 kWh/100 km	99 mpg‑e 34.0 kWh/100 mi; 21.2 kWh/100 km	(1) (2) (9)
Volt, Gasoline only	2016	42 mpg	43 mpg	42 mpg	(1) (2) (9)
Toyota Prius Eco (4th gen); Hybrid electric vehicle (HEV); Gasoline-electric hybrid	2016	56 mpg	58 mpg	53 mpg	(2) (10)
Ford Fusion AWD A-S6 2.0L; Gasoline-powered (Average new vehicle)	2016	25 mpg	22 mpg	31 mpg	(2) (11)
Notes: All estimated fuel economy based on 15,000 miles (24,000 km) annual driving, 45% highway and 55% city (1) Conversion 1 gallon of gasoline=33.7 kW·h. (2) The 2014 i3 REx is classified by EPA as a series plug-in hybrid, while for CARB is a range-extended battery-electric vehicle (BEVx). The i3 REx is the most fuel economic EPA-certified current year vehicle with a gasoline engine with a combined gasoline/electricity rating of 88 mpg-e, but its total range is limited to 150 mi (240 km). (3) The 2014/16 BMW i3 (60 A·h) ranked as the most fuel economic EPA-certified vehicle of all fuel types considered in all years until MY 2016. It was surpassed by the 2017 Hyundai Ioniq Electric in November 2016. (4) The i3 REx has a combined fuel economy in all-electric mode of 117 mpg-e (29 kW·h/100 mi; 18 kW⋅h/100 km). (5) The 2016 model year Leaf correspond to the variant with the 24 kW·h battery pack. (6) Ratings correspond to both convertible and coupe models. (7) Model with 85 kW·h battery pack (8) Most fuel economic plug-in hybrid capable of long distance travel. The 2016 Volt has a rating of 77 mpg-e for combined gasoline/electricity operation. (9) Most fuel economic hybrid electric car. (10) Other 2016 MY cars achieving 25 mpg_{‑US} (9.4 L/100 km; 30 mpg_{‑imp}) combined city/hwy include the Honda Accord A-S6 3.5L, Toyota Camry A-S6 3.5L and Toyota RAV4 A-S6 2.5L.

ADAC also carried out consumption measurements.
