= Andreas Flocken =

German entrepreneur and inventor

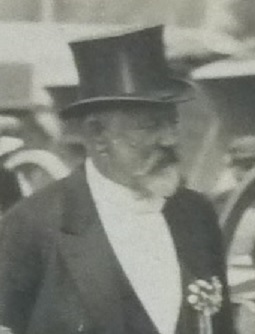
Andreas Flocken, 1910

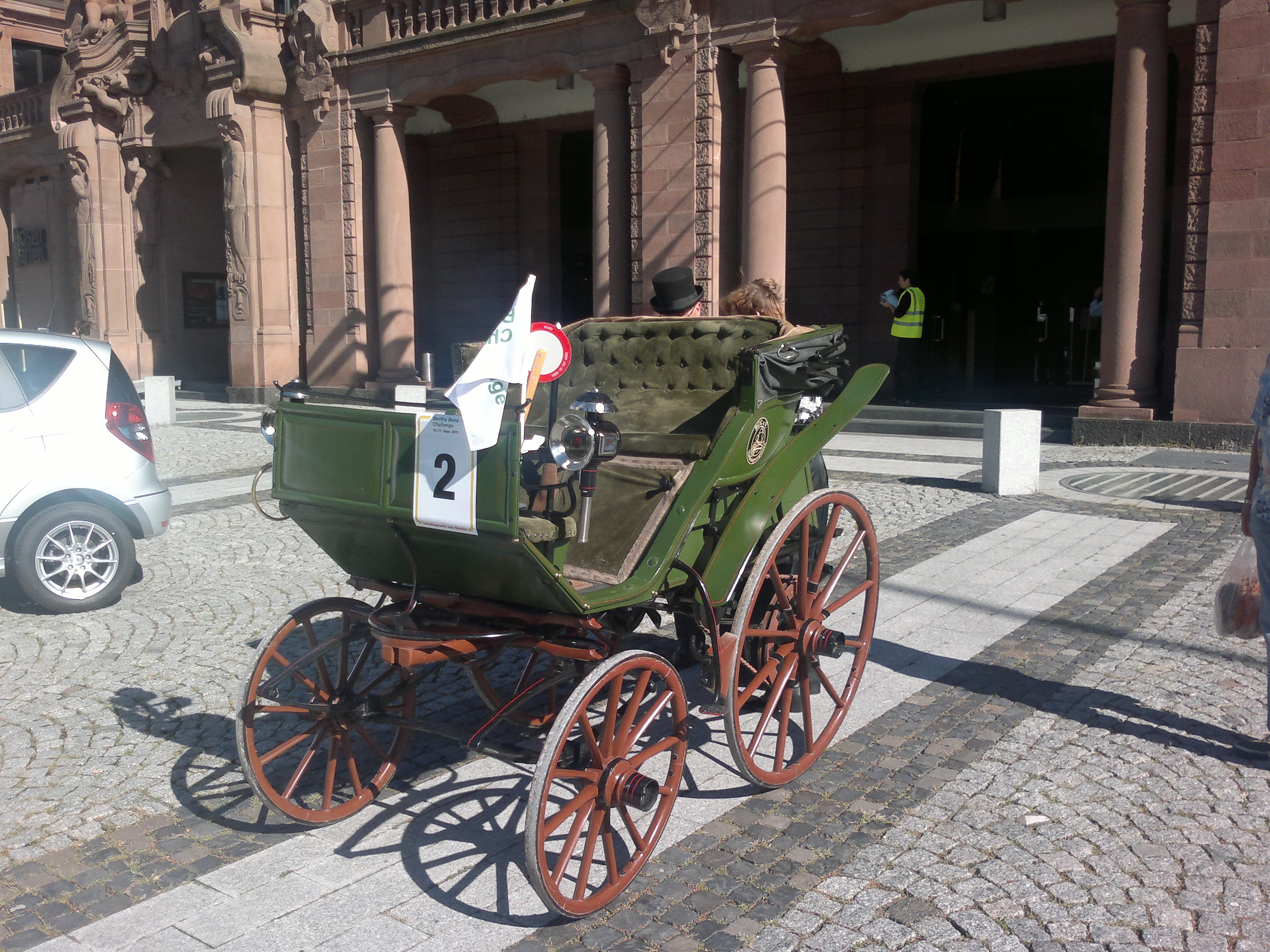
Flocken Elektrowagen, 1888 (reconstruction, 2011)

Andreas Flocken (born 6 February 1845 in Albersweiler, Rheinpfalz, Kingdom of Bavaria, German Confederation; died 29 April 1913 in Coburg, Duchy of Saxe-Coburg and Gotha, German Empire) was a German entrepreneur and inventor.

== Life ==
Until 1868 Flocken worked for German company Heinrich Lanz AG in Mannheim. Then he worked for company Schoppers in Zeulenroda. Since 1879, Flocken and his family lived in Coburg. In 1880, Flocken started his own company in Coburg.

=== Flocken electric car ===
The Flocken Elektrowagen of 1888 by German inventor Andreas Flocken is regarded as the first real electric car of the world.

== Literature ==
- Harald Linz, Halwart Schrader: Die Internationale Automobil-Enzyklopädie. United Soft Media Verlag GmbH, München 2008, ISBN 978-3-8032-9876-8
- Halwart Schrader: Deutsche Autos 1885–1920. Motorbuch Verlag, Stuttgart, ISBN 3-613-02211-7
