= Buffalo =

Buffalo most commonly refers to:

- True buffalo or Bubalina, a subtribe of wild cattle, including most "Old World" buffalo, such as water buffalo
- Bison, a genus of wild cattle, including the American buffalo
- Buffalo, New York, a city in the northeastern US

Buffalo or buffaloes may also refer to:

== Animals ==
- Bubalina, a subtribe of the tribe Bovini within the subfamily Bovinae
  - African buffalo or Cape buffalo (Syncerus caffer)
  - Bubalus, a genus of bovines including various water buffalo species
    - Wild water buffalo (Bubalus arnee)
    - Water buffalo (Bubalus bubalis)
      - Buffalo meat, the meat of the water buffalo
      - Italian Mediterranean buffalo, a breed of water buffalo
    - Anoa
    - Tamaraw (Bubalus mindorensis)
    - Bubalus murrensis, an extinct species of water buffalo that occupied riverine habitats in Europe in the Pleistocene
- Bison, large, even-toed ungulates in the genus Bison within the subfamily Bovinae
  - American bison (Bison bison), also commonly referred to as the American buffalo or simply "buffalo" in North America
  - European bison, also known as the European buffalo
- Ictiobus, a North American genus of fish, known as buffalos

== Places ==
=== Canada ===
- Buffalo, Alberta, a ghost town
- Buffalo National Park, Alberta
- Rural Municipality of Buffalo No. 409, Saskatchewan, a rural municipality
- Province of Buffalo, a proposed Canadian province

=== United States ===
- Buffalo, New York, the largest city by population with its name
  - Buffalo Niagara International Airport
- Buffalo, Illinois
- Buffalo, Indiana
- Buffalo, Iowa
- Buffalo, Kansas
- Buffalo, Kentucky
- Buffalo, Minnesota
- Buffalo, Missouri
- Buffalo, Montana
- Buffalo, Nebraska
- Buffalo, North Carolina
- Buffalo, North Dakota
- Buffalo, Guernsey County, Ohio
- Buffalo, Jackson County, Ohio
- Buffalo, Oklahoma
- Buffalo, South Carolina
- Buffalo, South Dakota
- Buffalo, Tennessee (disambiguation)
- Buffalo, Texas
- Buffalo, Henderson County, Texas
- Buffalo, West Virginia
- Buffalo, Jackson County, West Virginia
- Buffalo, Buffalo County, Wisconsin
- Buffalo, Marquette County, Wisconsin
- Buffalo, Wyoming
- Buffalo City, Arkansas, an unincorporated community and census-designated place
- Buffalo City, North Carolina, a town
- Buffalo City, Wisconsin, a city
- Buffalo County (disambiguation)
- Buffalo Township (disambiguation)

=== Elsewhere ===
- Buffalo, Victoria, Australia
- Buffalo City Metropolitan Municipality, Eastern Cape Province, South Africa

== Coins ==
- American Buffalo (coin), a 24-karat bullion coin introduced 2006
- Buffalo nickel, a copper-nickel coin minted 1913–1938

== Games ==
- Buffalo (card game)
- Buffalo (drinking game)

== Military ==
- HMS Buffalo, several Royal Navy ships
- USS Buffalo, several U.S. Navy ships
- Landing Vehicle Tracked, a World War II-era amphibious vehicle
- Operation Buffalo (disambiguation)
- Avro 571 Buffalo, a 1920s prototype British carrier-based torpedo bomber biplane
- Brewster F2A Buffalo, a 1930s–1940s American fighter aircraft
- Buffalo (mine protected vehicle)

== Music ==
- Buffalo (band), an Australian hard rock group
  - Buffalo (EP), by Buffalo
- Buffalo (Frank Zappa album)
- Buffalo (The Phoenix Foundation album)
- "Buffalo", a track from Cherry Bomb by Tyler, the Creator

== People ==
- Chief Buffalo (disambiguation)
- Norton Buffalo (1951–2009), American singer-songwriter and musician
- Ted Buffalo (1885–1969), Native American football player
- Tishynah Buffalo, Indigenous Canadian fashion designer
- Black Buffalo (wrestler) (born 1974), Japanese professional wrestler

== Schools ==
- University at Buffalo, a public research university in New York
- Buffalo State College, a public college in Buffalo, New York

== Sport ==
=== Baseball ===
- Northern Territory Buffaloes, a defunct Australian baseball team
- Orix Buffaloes, a 2004–present Japanese baseball team
- Osaka Kintetsu Buffaloes, a 1950–2004 Japanese baseball team
- Buffalo Bisons, a professional minor league baseball team based in Buffalo, New York

=== Football ===
- Buffalo Bills, a National Football League team
- Darwin Buffaloes, an Australian rules football team
- Green Buffaloes F.C., a Zambian football team
- K.A.A. Gent, a Belgian association football team
- South Africa national Australian rules football team, nicknamed the Buffaloes

=== Hockey ===
- Buffalo Sabres, a National Hockey League team
- Basingstoke Buffalo, an English ice hockey team
- Calgary Buffaloes, a 1966–67 Western Canada Junior Hockey League team
- Calgary Buffaloes (AJHL), a 1963–1966 Alberta Junior Hockey League team

=== Other uses in sport ===
- Colorado Buffaloes, the athletic teams of the University of Colorado Boulder
- Manitoba Buffalo, a Canadian rugby union team
- Milligan College Buffaloes, the athletic teams for Milligan College
- Vélodrome Buffalo and Stade Buffalo, cycling tracks in Paris
- Buffalo Bulls, the athletic teams of the University at Buffalo

== Technology ==
- Buffalo Inc., a Japanese technology company
- Buffalo AirStation, a line of wireless LAN equipment
- Buffalo network-attached storage series
- BUFFALO, the bootloader for the Freescale 68HC11 microcontroller family

== Transportation ==
=== Air ===
- Buffalo Airways, a Canadian airline
- de Havilland Canada DHC-5 Buffalo, a 1965–1972 Canadian turboprop aircraft

=== Land ===
- Buffalo (1901 automobile), a 1900–1902 American car
- Buffalo Electric Vehicle Company, a 1912–1915 American car company
- GM Buffalo bus
- South Devon Railway Buffalo class, a class of locomotives
- GWR 1076 Class, a class of locomotives often referred to as the "Buffalo Class"

== Other uses ==
- Buffalo (footwear), a clothing brand
- Royal Antediluvian Order of Buffaloes, a fraternal organisation
- Pistol-whipping, or "buffaloing", using a handgun as a blunt weapon

== See also ==
- American buffalo (disambiguation)
- Buffalo Bill, American scout, bison hunter, and showman William Cody (1846–1917)
- Buffalo robe, a cured bison hide with the hair, used for saddles, blankets, and padding in carriages and sleighs
- Buffalo coat, a heavy winter coat made from a buffalo robe or hide
- Buffalo wing, a style of chicken wing prepared with a spicy sauce coating
- Buffalo Exchange, a fashion retailer
- Buffalo Gap (disambiguation)
- Buffalo Trace (disambiguation)
- New Buffalo (disambiguation)
- Buffalo buffalo Buffalo buffalo buffalo buffalo Buffalo buffalo, a sentence illustrating homonyms and homophones
- Bufalo (disambiguation)
