= Buffalo Township, Kansas =

Buffalo Township, Kansas may refer to:

- Buffalo Township, Barton County, Kansas
- Buffalo Township, Jewell County, Kansas
- Buffalo Township, Cloud County, Kansas

== See also ==
- List of Kansas townships
- Buffalo Township (disambiguation)
