= European buffalo =

European buffalo may refer to:

- Aurochs, the wild ancestor of domestic cattle
- European bison or wisent
- Bubalus murrensis, an extinct species of water buffalo that occupied riverine habitats in Europe in the Pleistocene

== See also ==
- Buffalo (disambiguation)
