= Buffalo (1901 automobile) =

Defunct American motor vehicle manufacturer

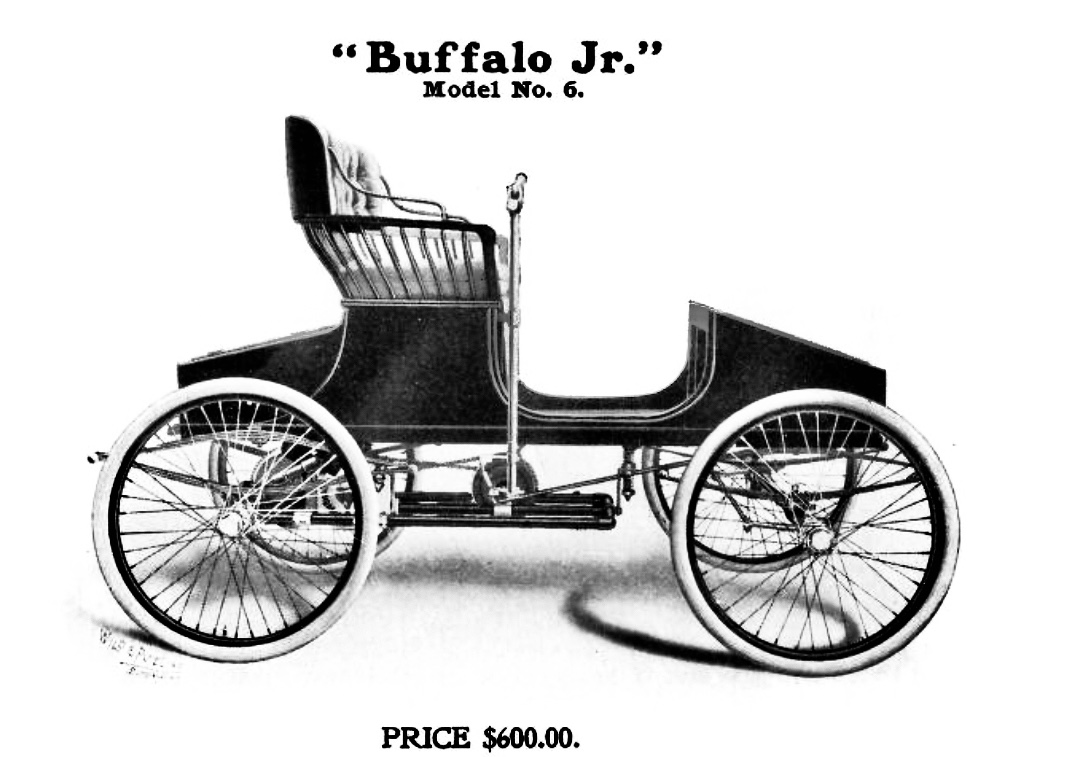
Buffalo Model 6 „Junior“ (1900–1902)

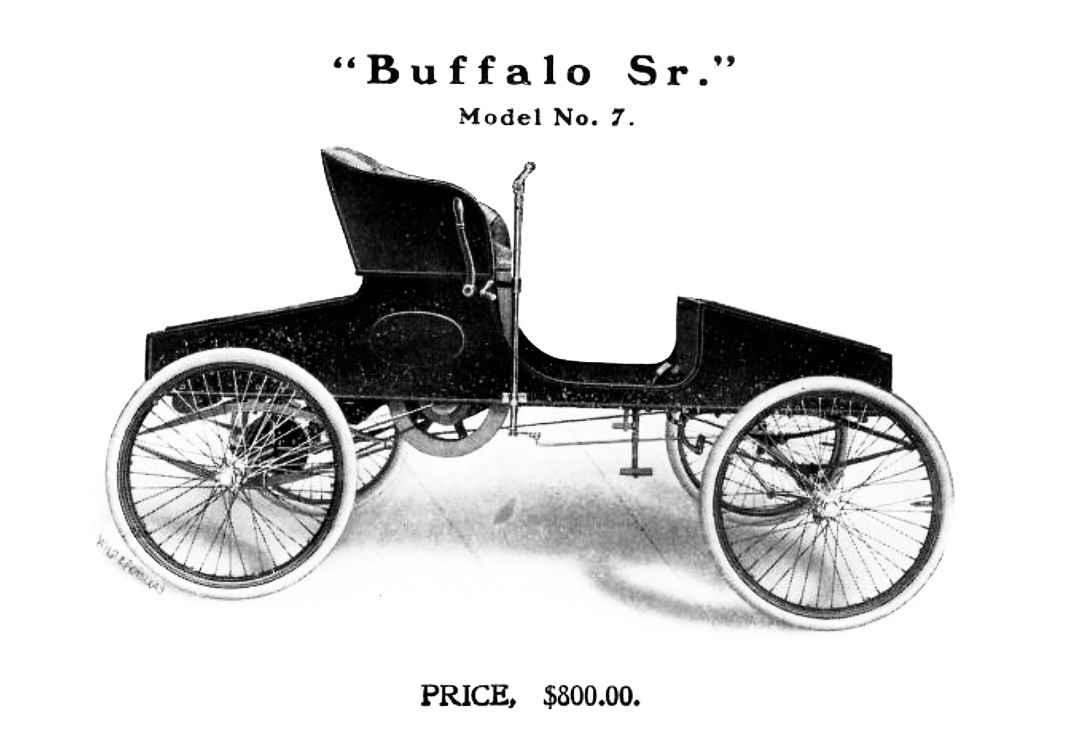
Buffalo Model 7 „Senior“ (1900–1902)

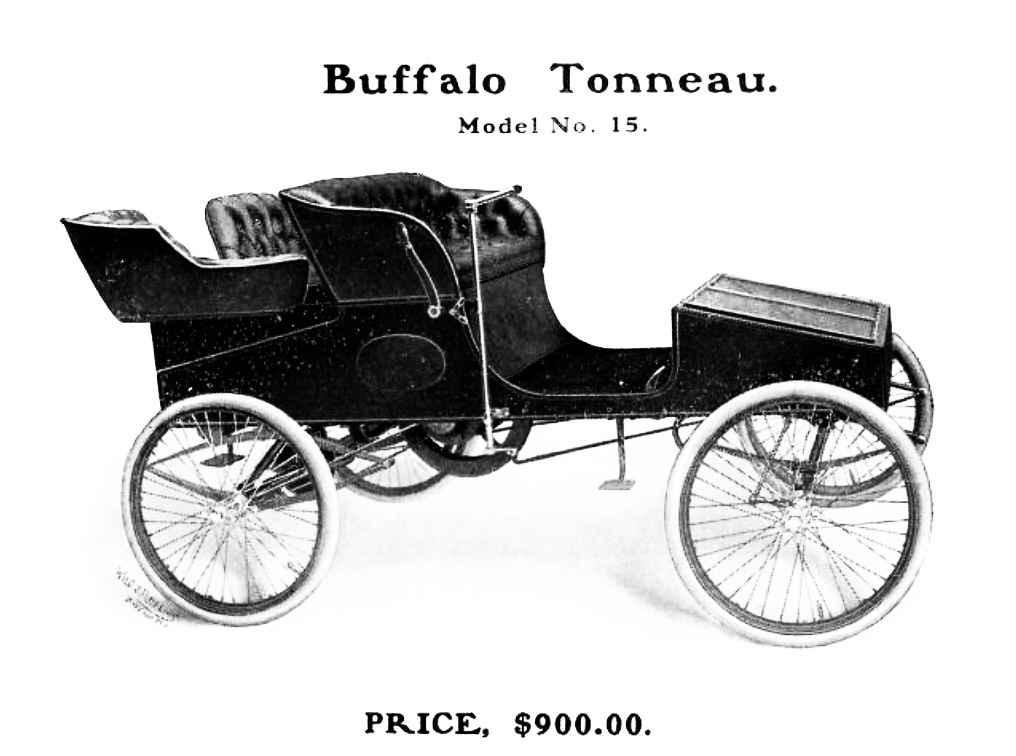
Buffalo Model 15 „Tonneau“ (1900–1902)

The Buffalo was an American automobile manufactured from 1900 until 1902, by the Buffalo Automobile and Auto-Bi Company of Buffalo, New York.

Two models were made, the Junior with a 3.5 hp (2.6 kW), and the Senior with 6 hp (4.5 kW) single-cylinder engines. The company also produced an "Auto.Bi", a two-wheeled motorcycle.

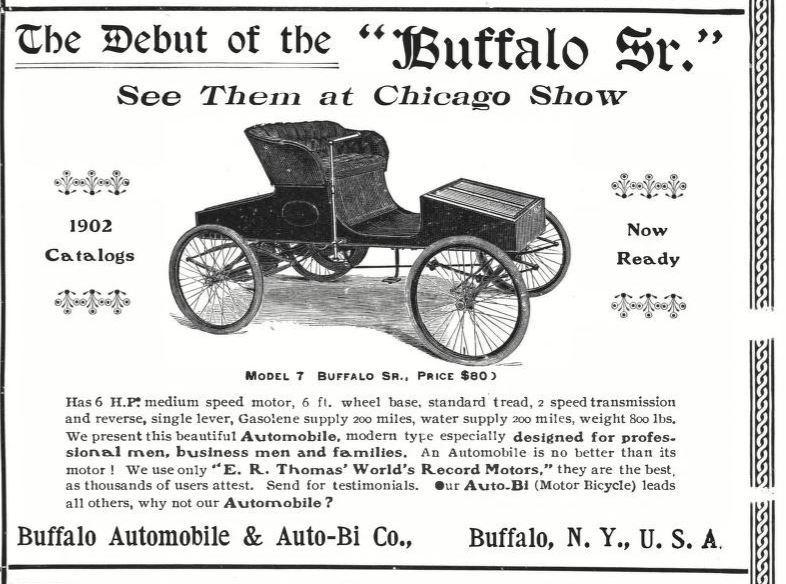
1902 Scientific American advertisement for the Buffalo Sr.

In 1903 the company was taken over by the E.R. Thomas Motor Company. They combined with Fort Plain Spring and Axel which also made 1 Cylinder Runabouts, Dr. Runabouts.

It had no connection with the Buffalo Electric Carriage Company which built cars in Buffalo at the same time.
