= Babcock Electric Carriage Company =

Defunct American motor vehicle manufacturer

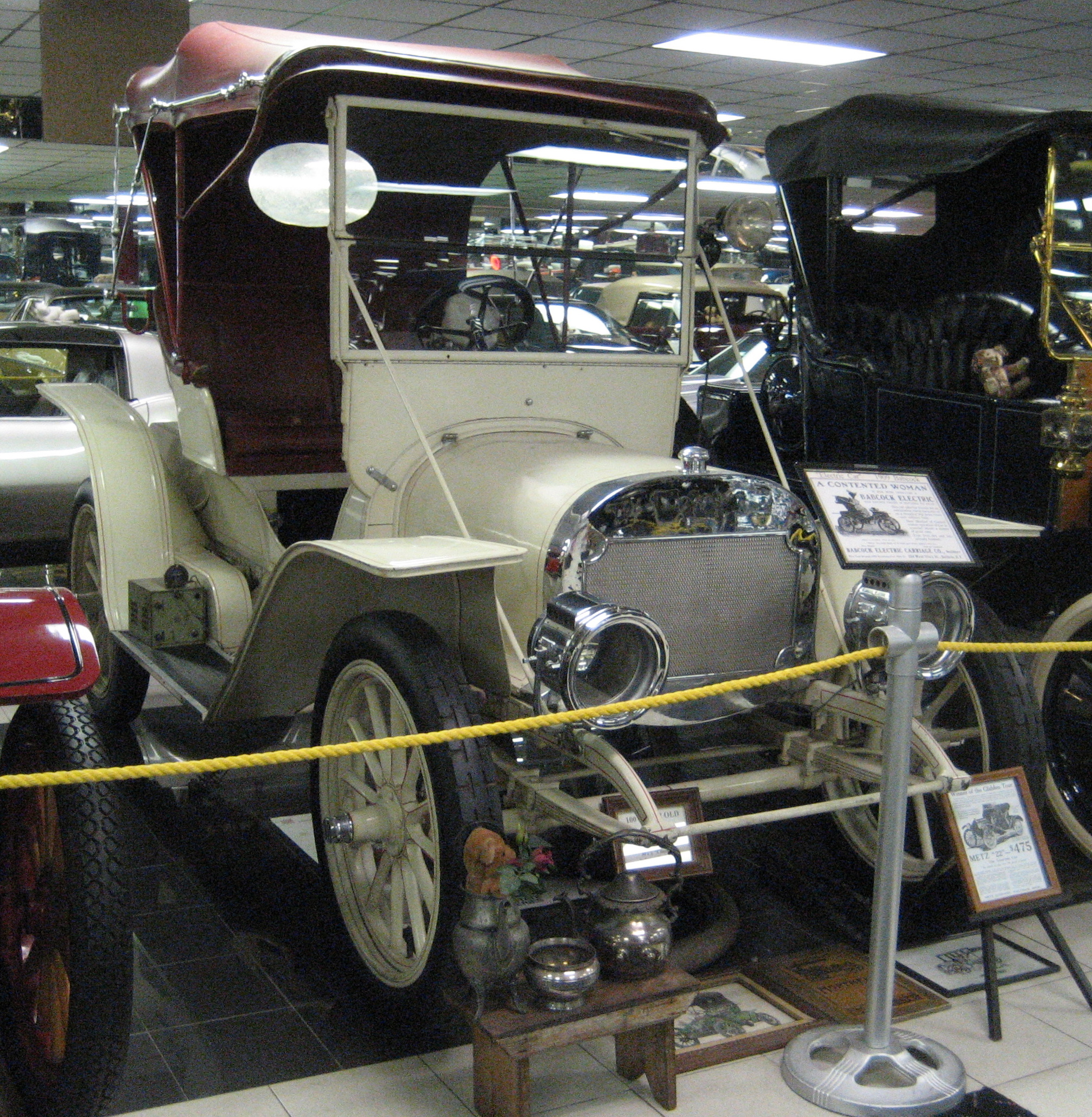
- Type: Automobile Manufacturing
- Industry: Automotive
- Genre: Sedans, touring cars
- Founded: 1906
- Founder: Francis A Babcock
- Defunct: 1912
- Fate: Merged with the Buffalo Electric Vehicle Company
- Headquarters: Buffalo, New York, United States
- Area served: United States
- Products: Vehicles; Automotive parts

The Babcock Electric Carriage Company was an American automobile company based in Buffalo, New York that produced electric vehicles under the Babcock brand from 1906 through 1912.

The company was founded by and named after Francis A Babcock. They offered a range of electric motorcars at prices ranging from $1,800 to $3,800.

In 1912 Babcock merged with the Buffalo Electric Vehicle Company.

== Production models ==
- Model 6
- Model 12
- Model 30
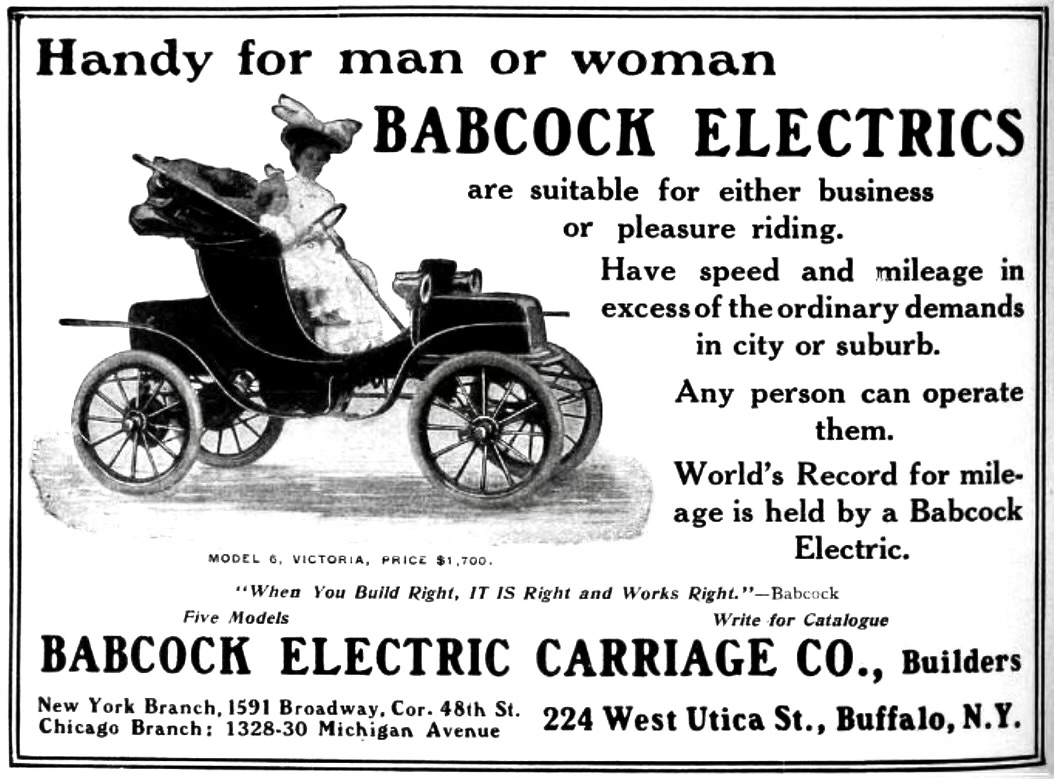
Babcock Model 6 (1908)

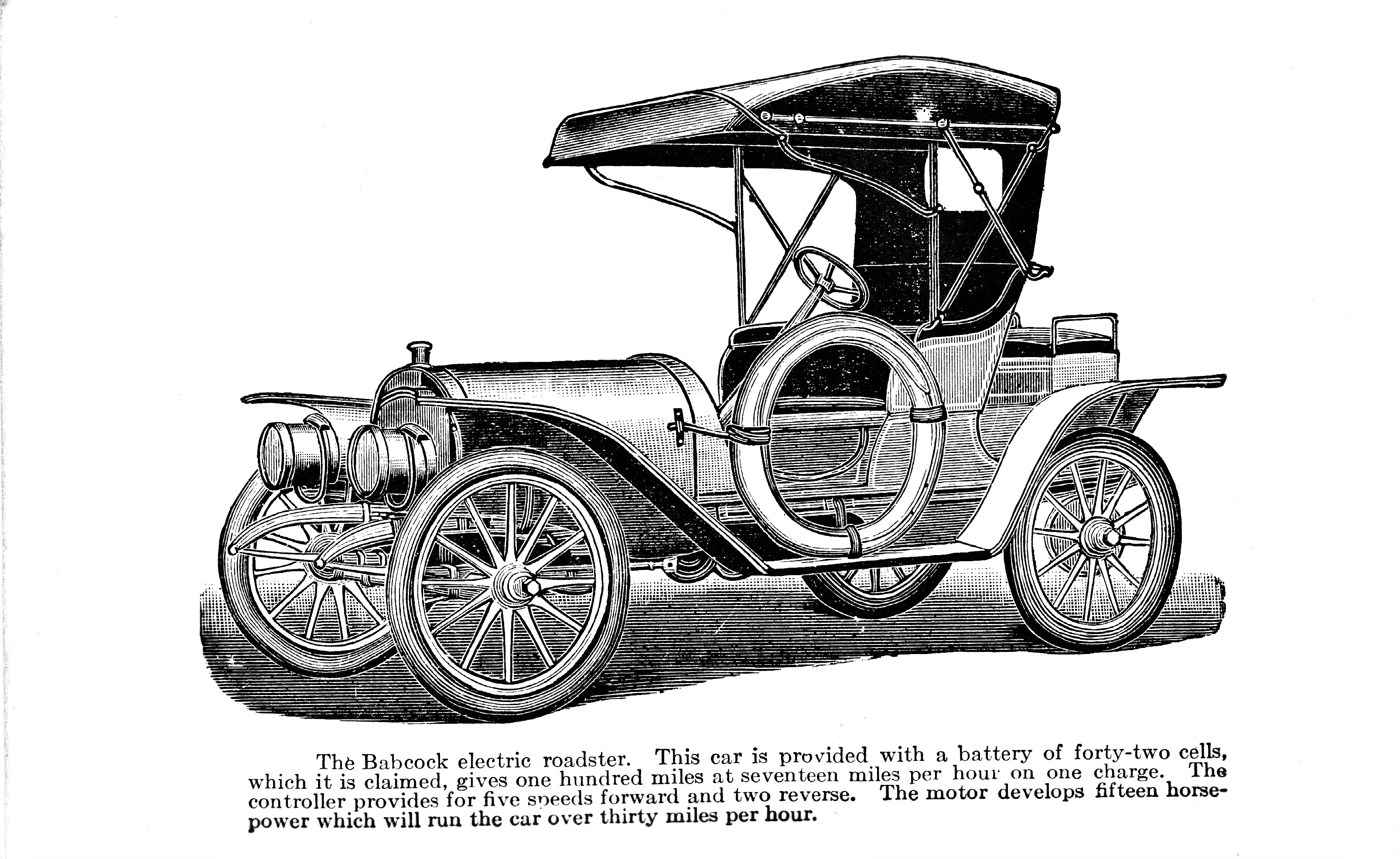
Babcock Electric Model 12 Roadster (1911)

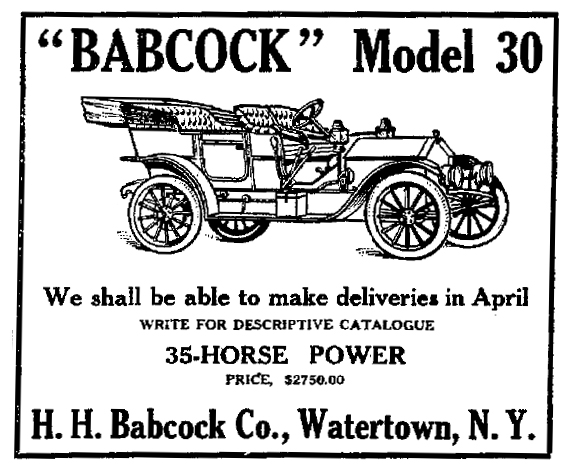
Babcock Model 30 (1910)

== See also ==
- History of the electric vehicle
