= Buffalo Electric Carriage =

Defunct American motor vehicle manufacturer

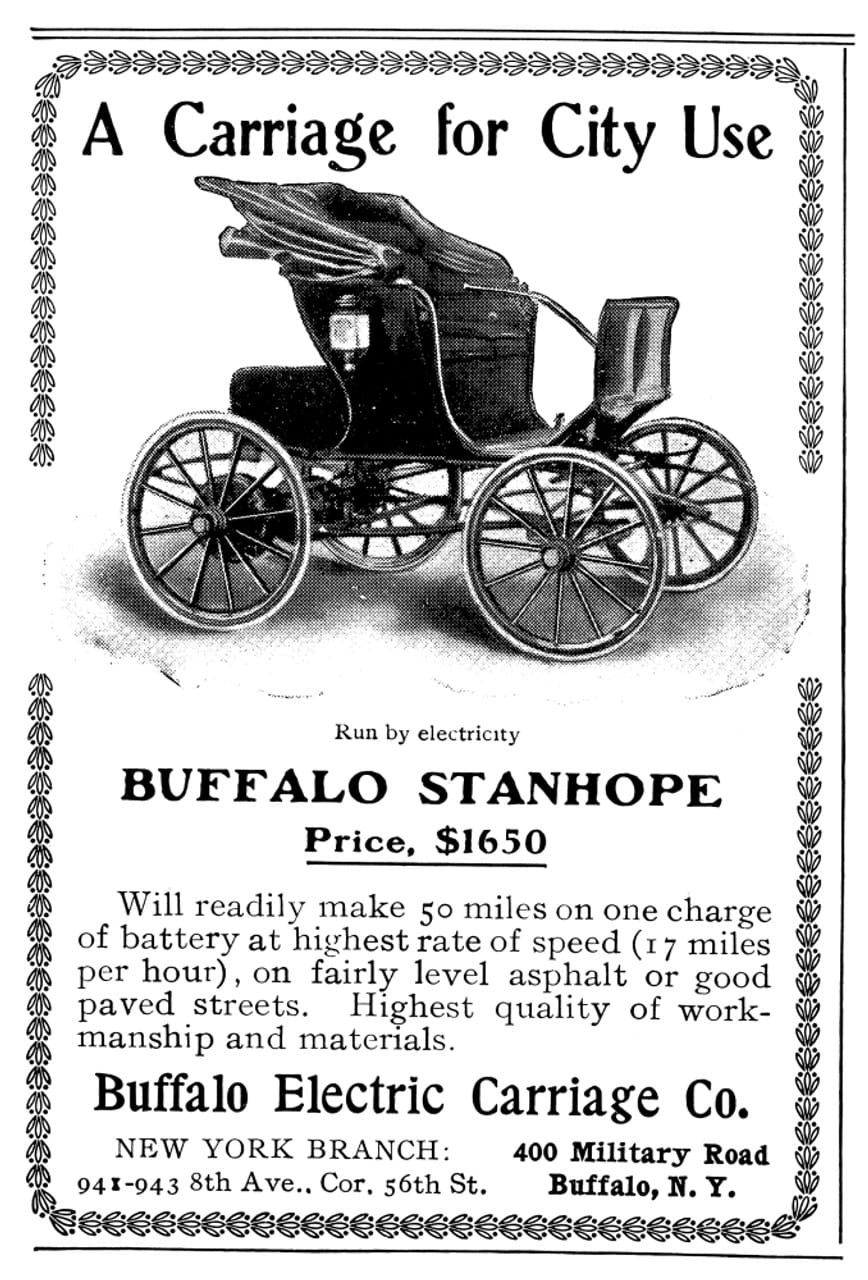
1903 ad for the company's vehicles

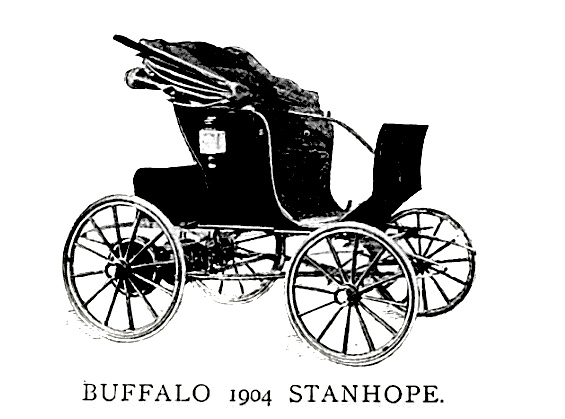
Buffalo Stanhope (1904)

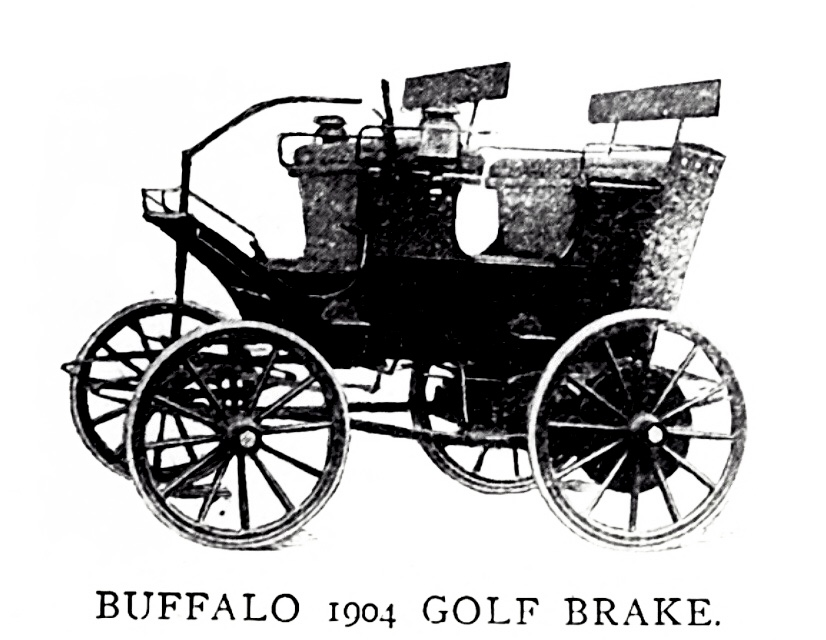
Buffalo Golf Brake (1904)

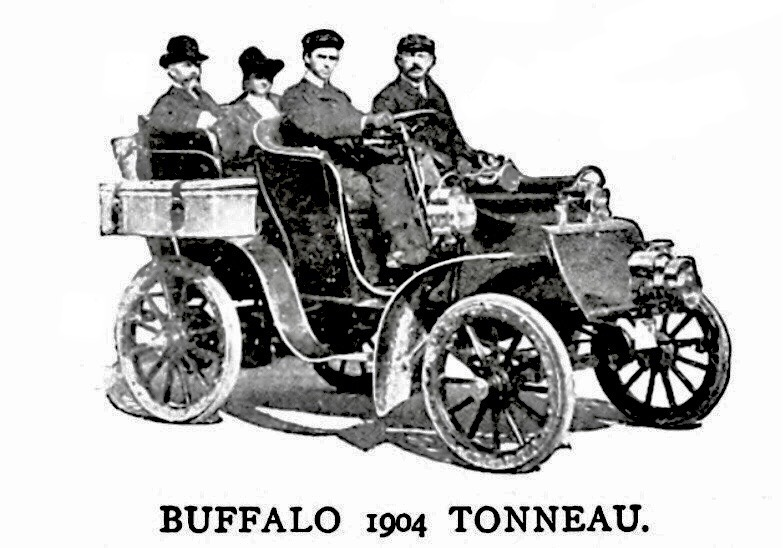
Buffalo Tonneau (1904)

Buffalo Electric Carriage Company was a Brass Era manufacturer of electric automobiles in Buffalo, New York.

The 1904 Buffalo Stanhope was a stanhope model. It could seat 2 passengers and sold for US$1650. The single electric motor produced 2.5 hp (1.9 kW). The car weighed 1800 lb (816 kg).

The 1904 Buffalo Golf Brake was a surrey model. Equipped with a tonneau, it could seat 6 passengers and sold for US$2200. Two electric motors were situated at the rear of the car, produced 2.5 hp (1.9 kW) each. The car weighed 2200 lb (998 kg).

The 1904 Buffalo Tonneau was a tonneau model. It could seat 4 passengers and sold for US$3000. The dual electric motors, situated at the rear of the car, produced 5 hp (3.7 kW) each and used a 40-cell pasted plate battery. The car weighed 3600 lb (1633 kg).

Year	Model	Vehicle body	wheelbase base
1901		Stanhope	
1902		Stanhope, Golf Brake	
1903		Victoria Stanhope, Touring	
1904		Stanhope, Golf Brake	1676 mm
1905–1906	Model 1	Stanhope 2 seater; 4 seater	
1905–1906	Model 3	Golf Brake	
1905–1906	Model 4	Stanhope 4 seater	

== See also ==
- Buffalo Electric Vehicle Company
- Historic electric vehicles
- Motor vehicle manufacturers based in New York (state)
