= Buffalo Trace =

Buffalo Trace may refer to:

- Vincennes Trace (sometimes known as Buffalo Trace due to its origin), a pioneer trail in southern Indiana
- Buffalo Trace Distillery, a maker of bourbon whiskey
- Buffalo Trace Council, a division of the Boy Scouts of America based in southwestern Indiana
- Buffalo Trace Park, a park near Palmyra, Indiana
