= Buffalo Township =

Buffalo Township may refer to:

== Arkansas ==
- Buffalo Township, Craighead County, Arkansas, in Craighead County, Arkansas

== Illinois ==
- Buffalo Township, Ogle County, Illinois

== Iowa ==
- Buffalo Township, Buchanan County, Iowa
- Buffalo Township, Kossuth County, Iowa
- Buffalo Township, Linn County, Iowa
- Buffalo Township, Scott County, Iowa
- Buffalo Township, Winnebago County, Iowa

== Kansas ==
- Buffalo Township, Barton County, Kansas
- Buffalo Township, Jewell County, Kansas
- Buffalo Township, Cloud County, Kansas

== Minnesota ==
- Buffalo Township, Wright County, Minnesota

== Missouri ==
- Buffalo Township, Dunklin County, Missouri
- Buffalo Township, Morgan County, Missouri
- Buffalo Township, Newton County, Missouri, in Newton County, Missouri
- Buffalo Township, Pike County, Missouri

== North Dakota ==
- Buffalo Township, North Dakota

== Ohio ==
- Buffalo Township, Ohio

== Oklahoma ==
- Buffalo Township, in Beckham County, Oklahoma
- Buffalo Township, in Garfield County, Oklahoma
- Buffalo Township, in Harper County, Oklahoma
- Buffalo Township, in Latimer County, Oklahoma
- Buffalo Township, in Noble County, Oklahoma

== Pennsylvania ==
- Buffalo Township, Butler County, Pennsylvania
- Buffalo Township, Perry County, Pennsylvania
- Buffalo Township, Union County, Pennsylvania
- Buffalo Township, Washington County, Pennsylvania
