= New Buffalo =

New Buffalo may refer to:

Places in the United States

- New Buffalo, Michigan
  - New Buffalo (Amtrak station), a train station in New Buffalo, Michigan
- New Buffalo Township, Michigan
- New Buffalo, Ohio, an unincorporated community
- New Buffalo, Pennsylvania
- New Buffalo (commune), commune in northern Taos County, New Mexico

Other uses

- New Buffalo, former alias of musician Sally Seltmann, based in Melbourne, Australia
  - New Buffalo (EP), an EP by New Buffalo
