= Buffalo coat =

Heavy winter garment

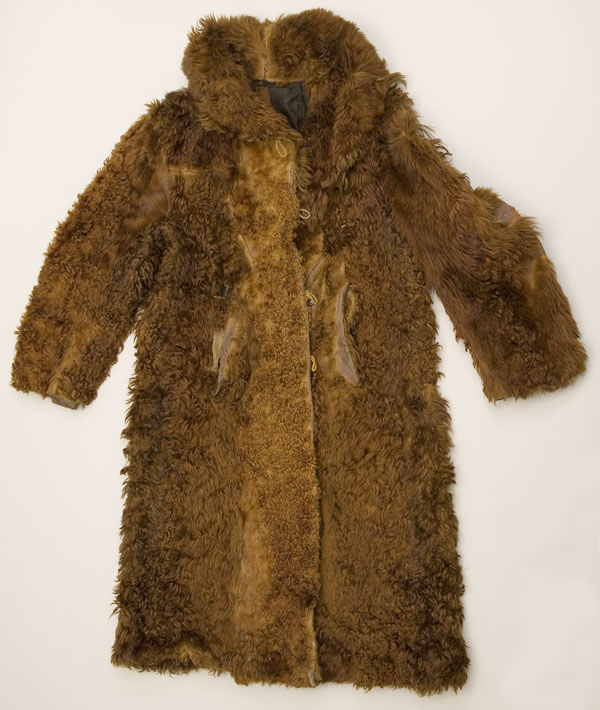
1880 Commercially-made bison coat

A buffalo coat is a heavy winter garment made from the bison, which also commonly known as the "buffalo" (though not closely related to African or Asian buffaloes). In North America they descended from the simpler, sleeveless buffalo robes worn by the Indigenous peoples of North America prior to their partial replacement by capotes made of point blankets during the North American fur trade. Similar garments were also used across Eurasia prior to the gradual displacement and near-extinction of the European bison or wisent. Commercially produced coats with sleeves and buttons became popular with non-indigenous people during the early settlement period of the American West and the Canadian prairies. Their use mostly ended because of a rising conservationist movement intended to preserve the bison, which had been hunted to near-extinction in North America as well.

Buffalo coats were issued to police and military officers, particularly the Royal Canadian Mounted Police and the United States Army, prior to their replacement by parkas. The coats were intended for use in extreme cold or arctic conditions. The RCMP (and other Canadian police services) briefly revived them in the 1930s when 700 hides were donated by the Canadian parks service. Guards on Parliament Hill continued to wear them until 1961. With the growing numbers of farmed bison being raised since the 1990s, buffalo coats are once again available, though they are much more expensive and many times heavier than modern winter wear made of manmade fabrics.

Canadian political commentator Tom Flanagan wears one daily during the winter at the University of Calgary where he teaches, and in 2013 wore it during a panel discussion on the CBC, which drew media attention.

== Gallery ==
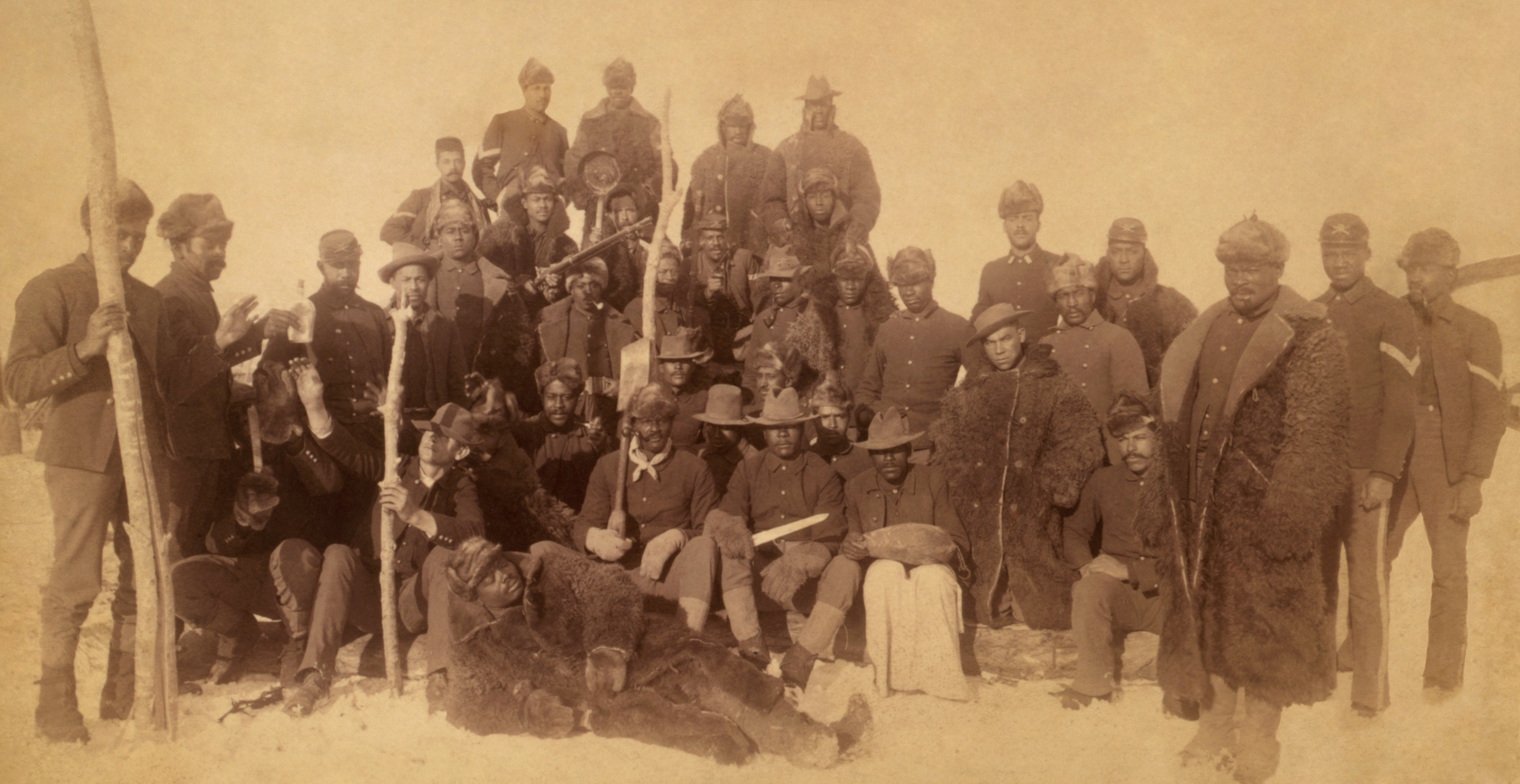
Buffalo soldiers some wearing buffalo coats, Ft. Keogh, Montana 1890

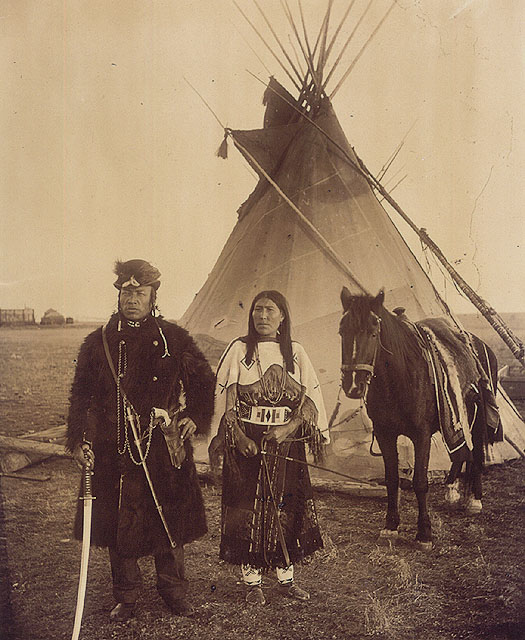
North-West Mounted Police scout wearing a buffalo coat. Gleichen, Alberta, ca. 1890

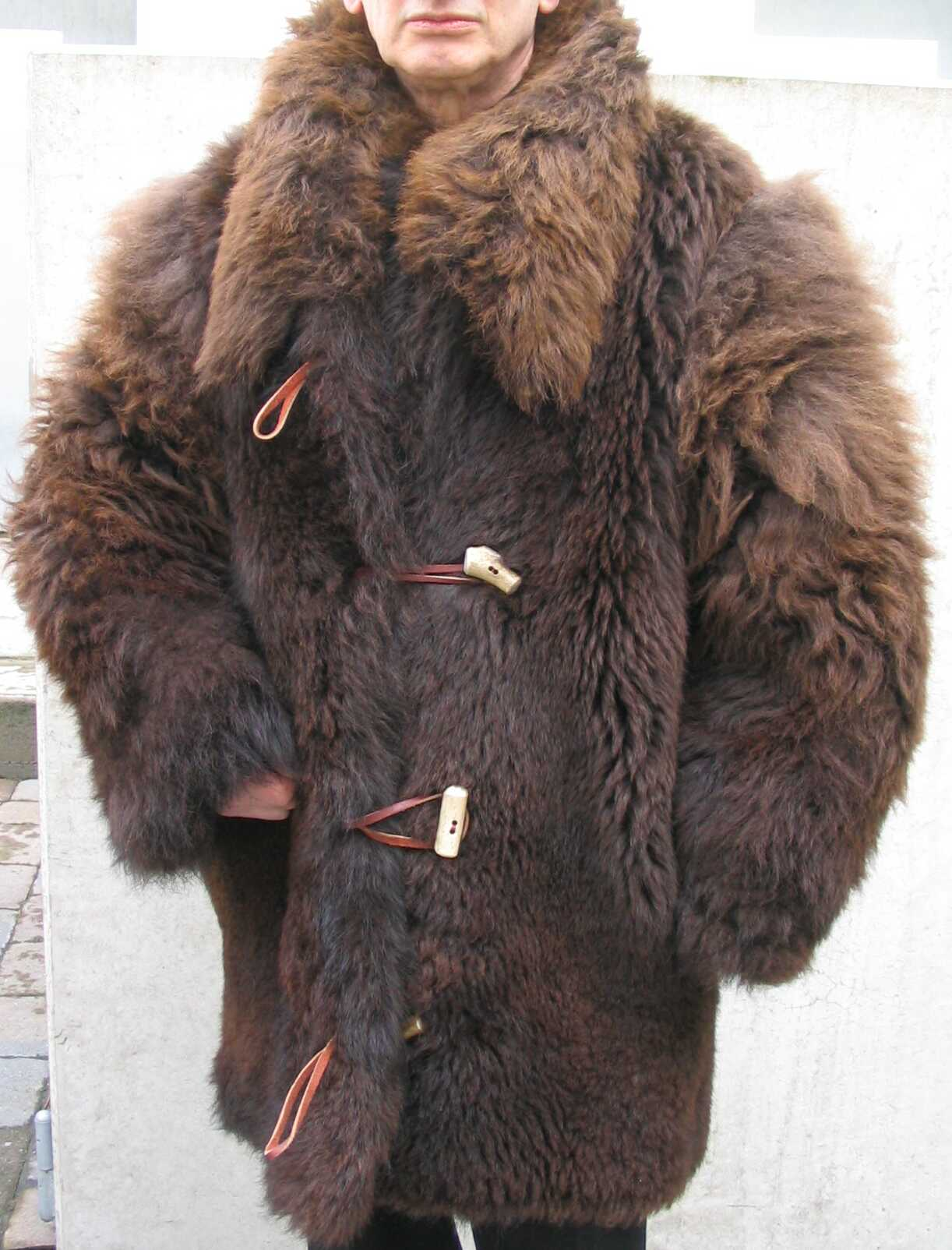
modern buffalo coat front (2008)

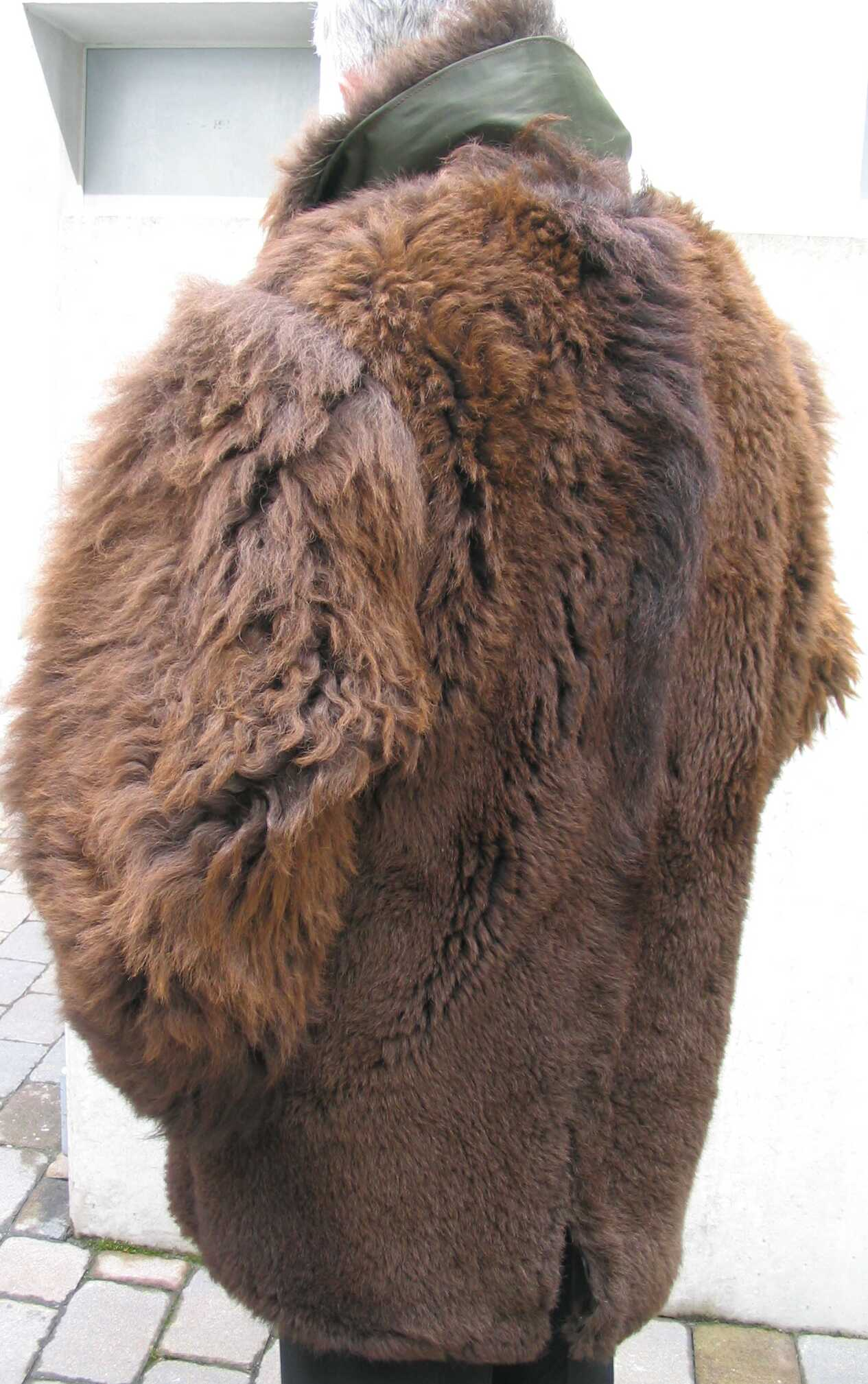
modern buffalo coat back (2008)
