= Buffalo County =

Buffalo County is the name of three counties in the United States:

- Buffalo County, Nebraska
- Buffalo County, South Dakota
- Buffalo County, Wisconsin
- Buffalo County, an extinct county in Kansas; see List of counties in Kansas
