= Chief Buffalo =

Chief Buffalo may refer to a number of people:

== Ojibwe ==
- Chief Buffalo or Kechewaishke (1759–1855), Ojibwa chief of the La Pointe Band of Lake Superior Chippewa
- Buffalo, an Ojibwa chief of the St. Croix Band
- Beshekee (Buffalo), an Ojibwa chief of the Leech Lake Band

== Sioux ==
- Buffalo, a Dakota chief about St. Croix River
- Black Buffalo (chief) (1767–1823), Sioux leader

== Other ==
- White Buffalo (Cheyenne leader) (1862–1929), chief of the Northern Cheyenne
- Buffalo Hump, Comanche leader
- Chief Buffalo Child Long Lance (1890–1932), journalist, soldier and Native American impostor
