= Buffalo Exchange =

Fashion resale retailer

- Type: privately owned
- Industry: fashion resale retailer sell new & used clothing
- Founded: 1974
- Headquarters: Tucson, Arizona
- Number of locations: 41 stores
- Area served: United States
- Website: buffaloexchange.com

Buffalo Exchange is an American fashion resale retailer. Operating under a "buy, sell, trade" business model, it buys clothing and accessories from the public and resells them to the public. Buffalo Exchange hand-selects and purchases the majority of their inventory from the local community.

Buffalo Exchange was established in 1974 in Tucson, Arizona by Kerstin Block and her husband, Spencer Block. It continues to be owned and operated by Kerstin's daughter, Rebecca Block, and in the last 50 years has expanded to over 40 stores throughout the United States.

== History ==
In 1974, Kerstin Block had an idea for a different sort of secondhand shop that would be clean, bright and curated and make secondhand clothing and accessories more accessible. Kerstin and her husband, Spencer, rented out a small 400 square foot spot in Tucson, AZ and pioneered the concept of buy-sell-trade for clothing, which was different from existing thrift and consignment models.

Within the first couple of years, they started expanding in Arizona and eventually opened a location in San Francisco. In the 1990s, the popularity of secondhand shopping grew and the husband-wife duo opened up 19 new locations across California, the Southwest and the Northwest.

The company is known for giving back to the community through initiatives like its annual Earth Day $1 Sale and its Tokens for Bags program.
