= Buffalo, Tennessee =

Buffalo, Tennessee may refer to the following places in Tennessee:

- Buffalo, Anderson County, Tennessee, an unincorporated community
- Buffalo, Hickman County, Tennessee, an unincorporated community
- Buffalo, Humphreys County, Tennessee, an unincorporated community
- Buffalo, Sullivan County, Tennessee, an unincorporated community
