= HMS Buffalo =

A number of ships of the Royal Navy have been named HMS Buffalo:

- HMS Buffalo was a storeship, launched in 1743 as the 70-gun third-rate HMS Captain. She was reduced to 64-guns in 1760, and renamed Buffalo and used as a storeship from 1777 until broken up in 1783.
- HMS Buffalo (1797) was 12-gun storeship built as the merchant vessel Fremantle, but purchased and launched in 1797. She was hulked in 1814 and sold in 1817.
- HMS Buffalo (1813) was a 16-gun storeship previously the East Indiaman Hindostan. She was purchased in 1813 and wrecked in 1840 off Mercury Bay. She was significant in the colonisation of South Australia.
- HMS Buffalo (1855) was an iron screw storeship transferred from the Treasury Department in 1855, where she had been known as Baron von Humboldt. She was renamed Buffalo in 1856, was transferred to the Victualling Department in 1868 and was sold in 1888.
- HMS Buffalo (1891) was an iron screw storeship transferred from the War Department in 1891, where she had been known as Earl de Gray & Ripon. She was sold in 1903.
- HMS Buffalo (1916) was a Trinculo-class mooring vessel launched in 1916 and sunk by a mine in 1941.
- HMS Buffalo was to have been a Catherine-class minesweeper. She was launched for the Royal Navy in 1943, but retained by the US Navy as USS Ardent.
