= Operation Buffalo =

Operation Buffalo may refer to:

- Operation Buffalo, a 1944 military operation, part of the Battle of Anzio in World War II
- Operation Buffalo (1956), four open-air nuclear tests at Maralinga, South Australia
- Operation Buffalo (1967), a Vietnam War operation
- Operation Buffalo (TV series), 2020 drama series based on the 1956 Operation Buffalo nuclear tests

== See also ==
- Operation Büffel (Buffalo), a 1943 withdrawal of the German 9th Army
