= Buffalo Gap =

Buffalo Gap is the name of several places in North America:

== United States ==
- Buffalo Gap, South Dakota, a town
- Buffalo Gap, Texas, a town
- Buffalo Gap, Virginia, an unincorporated community and a mountain pass
- Buffalo Gap High School, a public high school in Swoope, Virginia named for the nearby gap
- Buffalo Gap National Grassland, South Dakota
- Buffalo Gap Wind Farm, Texas

== Canada ==
- Buffalo Gap, Saskatchewan, a community
