= Buffalo robe =

Buffalo hides used by Plains Indians

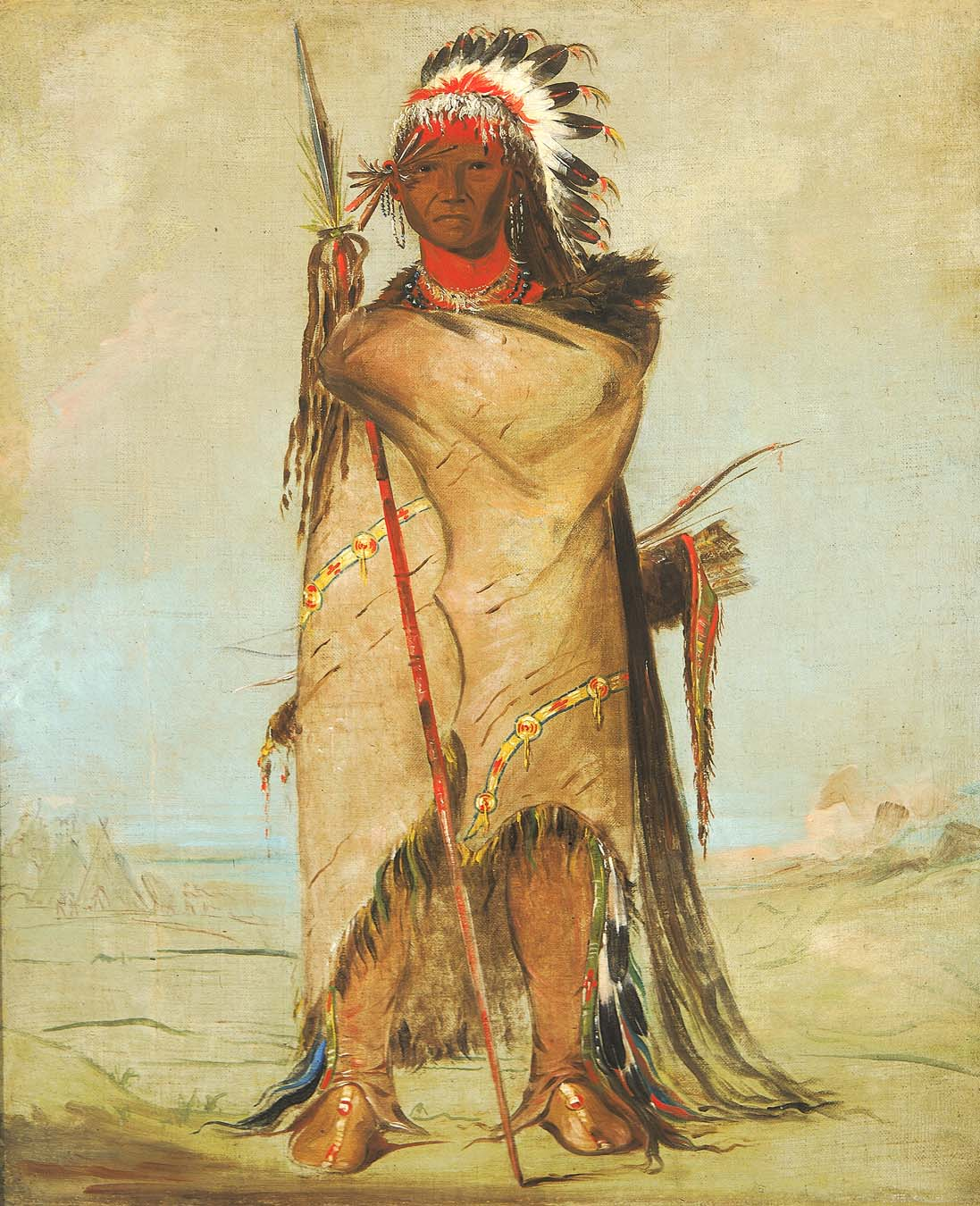
Hó-ra-tó-a, a Crow warrior with headdress, painted buffalo robe, and hair reaching the ground. Painted by George Catlin, Fort Union 1832.

A buffalo robe is a cured buffalo pelt, with the hair left on. They are used as blankets, saddles, or as trade items by Plains Indians, the Native Americans from the vast grasslands of the Interior Plains.

Some have been painted with pictographs or winter counts that depict important events such as epidemics, famines, and battles.

From the 1840s to the 1870s, the great demand for buffalo robes in the commercial centers of Montréal, New York, Saint Paul, and Saint Louis was a major factor that led to the near extinction of the species. The robes were used as blankets and padding in carriages and sleighs and were made into buffalo coats.

Only pelts taken in winter between November and March, when the furs are in their prime, are suitable for buffalo robes. The summer hides have their hair removed, are tanned, and are used for dresses, pouches, moccasins, and other useful items. Historically, they were used for tipis.

== Gallery ==
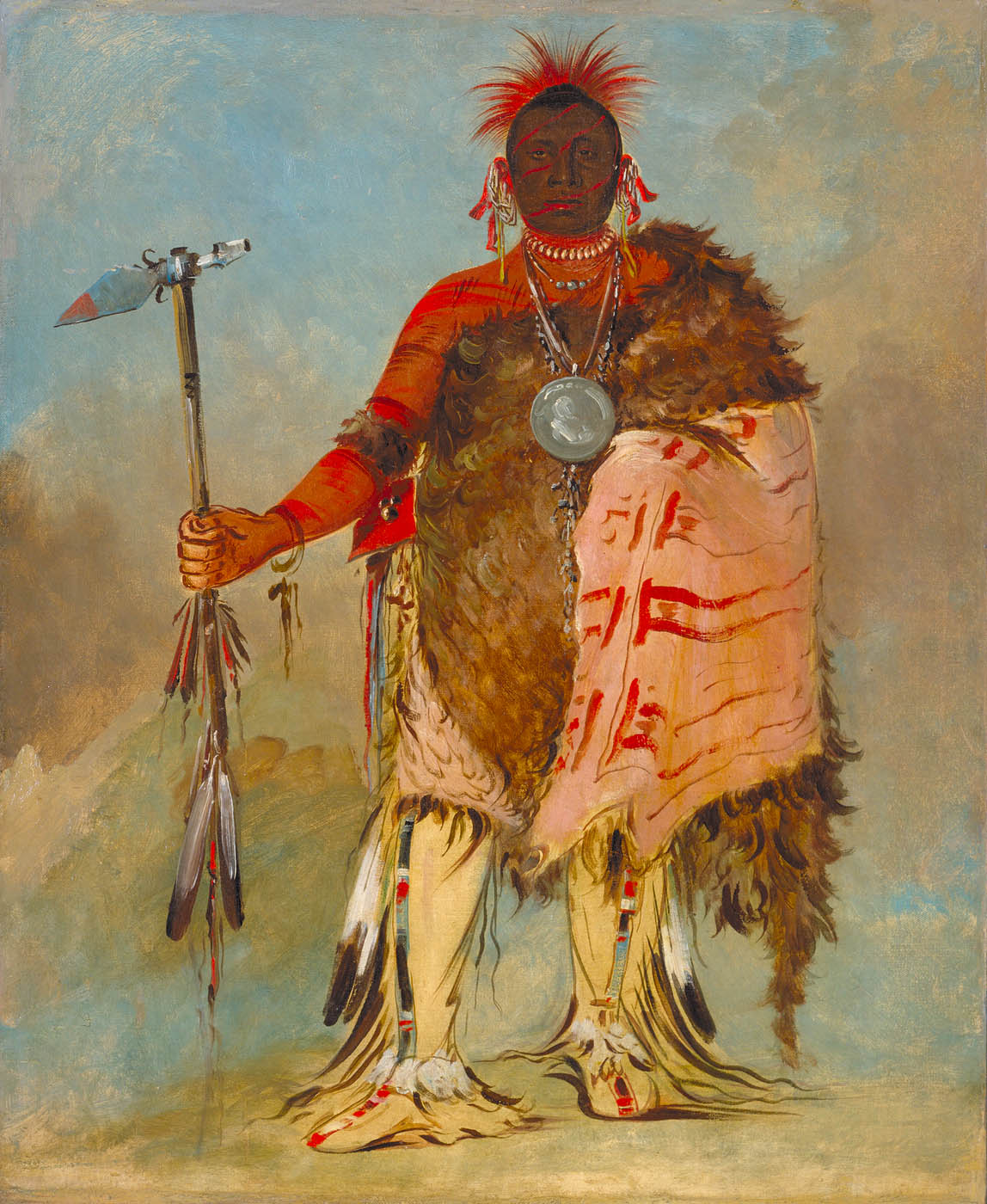
Chief Big Elk painted from life by George Catlin 1832 at Fort Leavenworth.

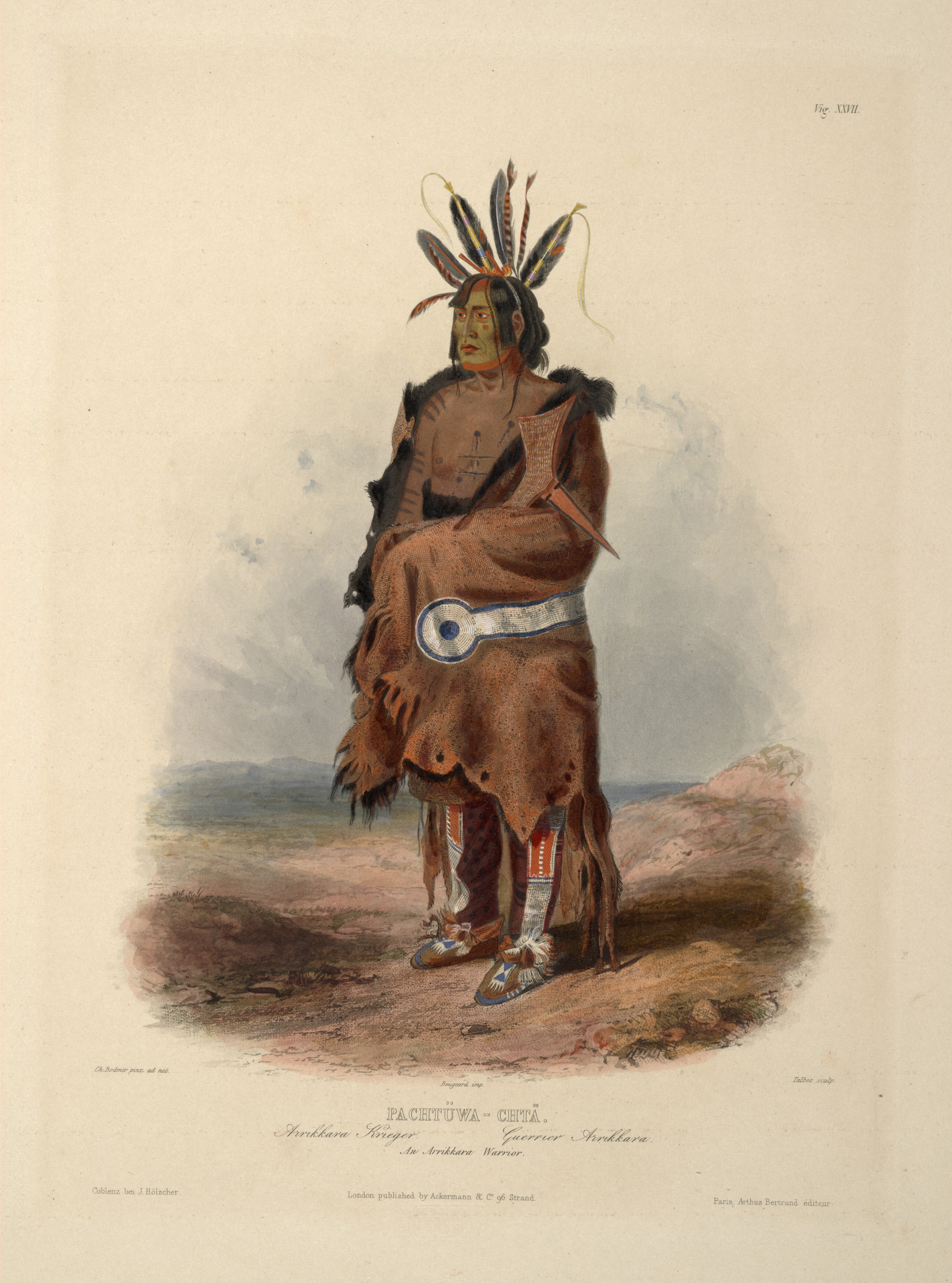
Karl Bodmer's portrait of an Arikara warrior wearing a beaded buffalo robe, early 1840s.

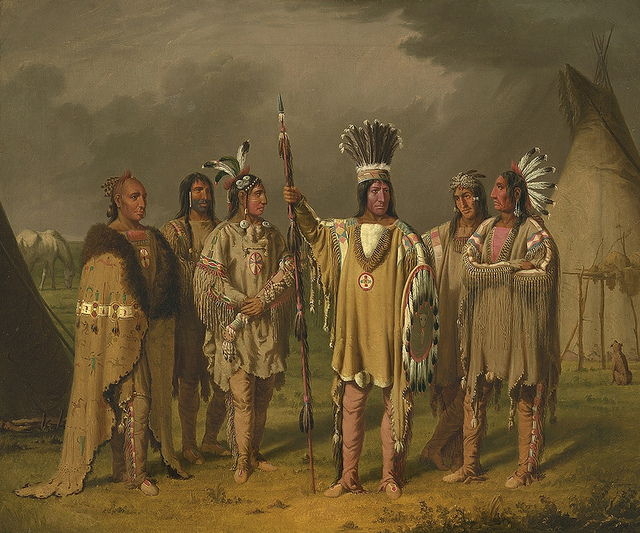
Six Blackfeet Chiefs - Paul Kane 1859

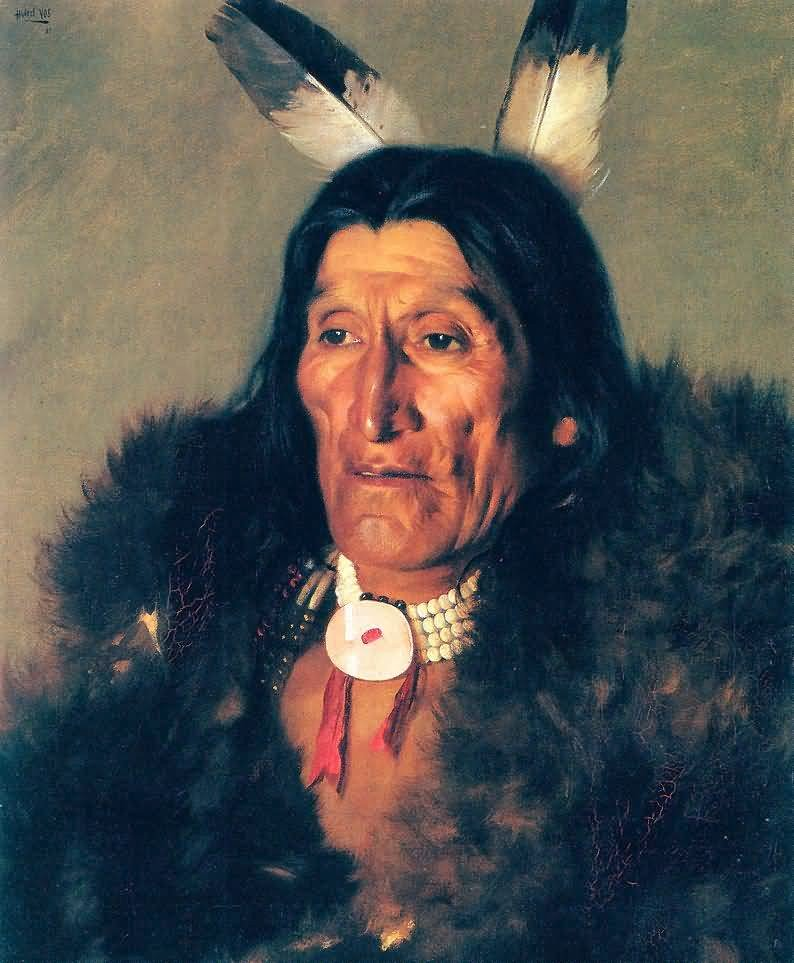
Hubert Vos- Sioux Chief In Buffalo Robes

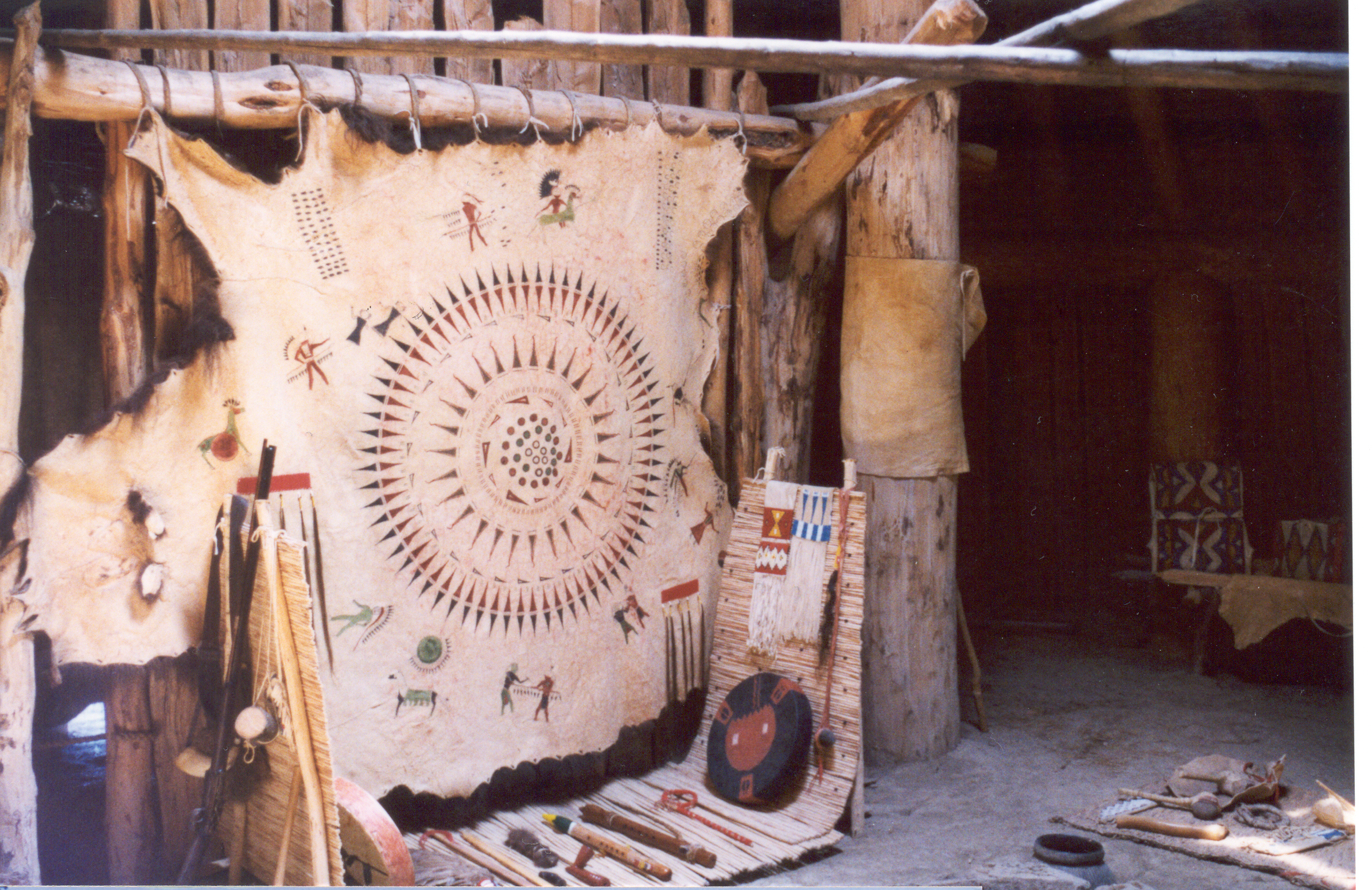
Knife River Villages buffalo robe featuring the "Feathered Sun" motif, photo by Chris Light

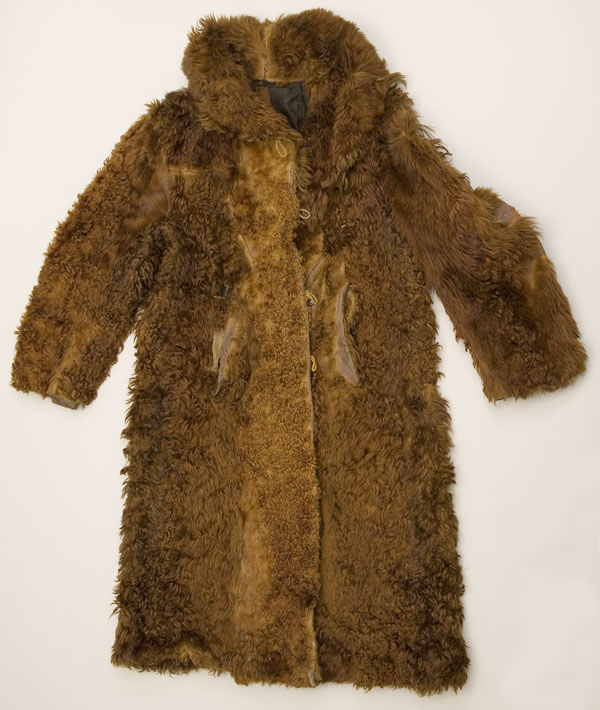
1880 Commercially-made bison coat

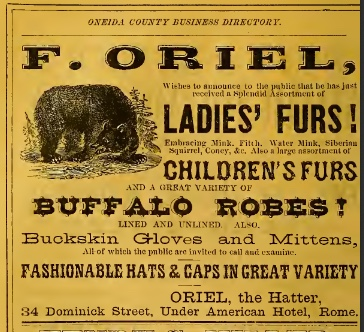

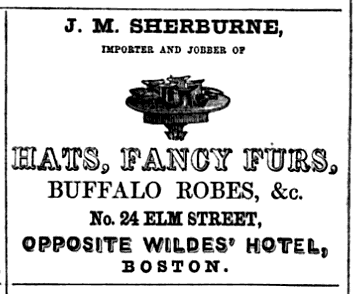

== See also ==
- Métis buffalo hunt § Buffalo robe trade
- Plains hide painting
- Koryaks § Culture
