= American Buffalo (disambiguation) =

American buffalo is an alternative name for the American bison

American Buffalo may also refer to:

- American Buffalo (play), a play by David Mamet
- American Buffalo (film), a 1996 film of Mamet's play directed by Michael Corrente
- American Buffalo (coin), a US coin
- The American Buffalo, a 2023 documentary by Ken Burns
