= Buffalo Electric Vehicle Company =

Defunct American motor vehicle manufacturer

- Buffalo Electric Vehicle Company Building
- U.S. National Register of Historic Places
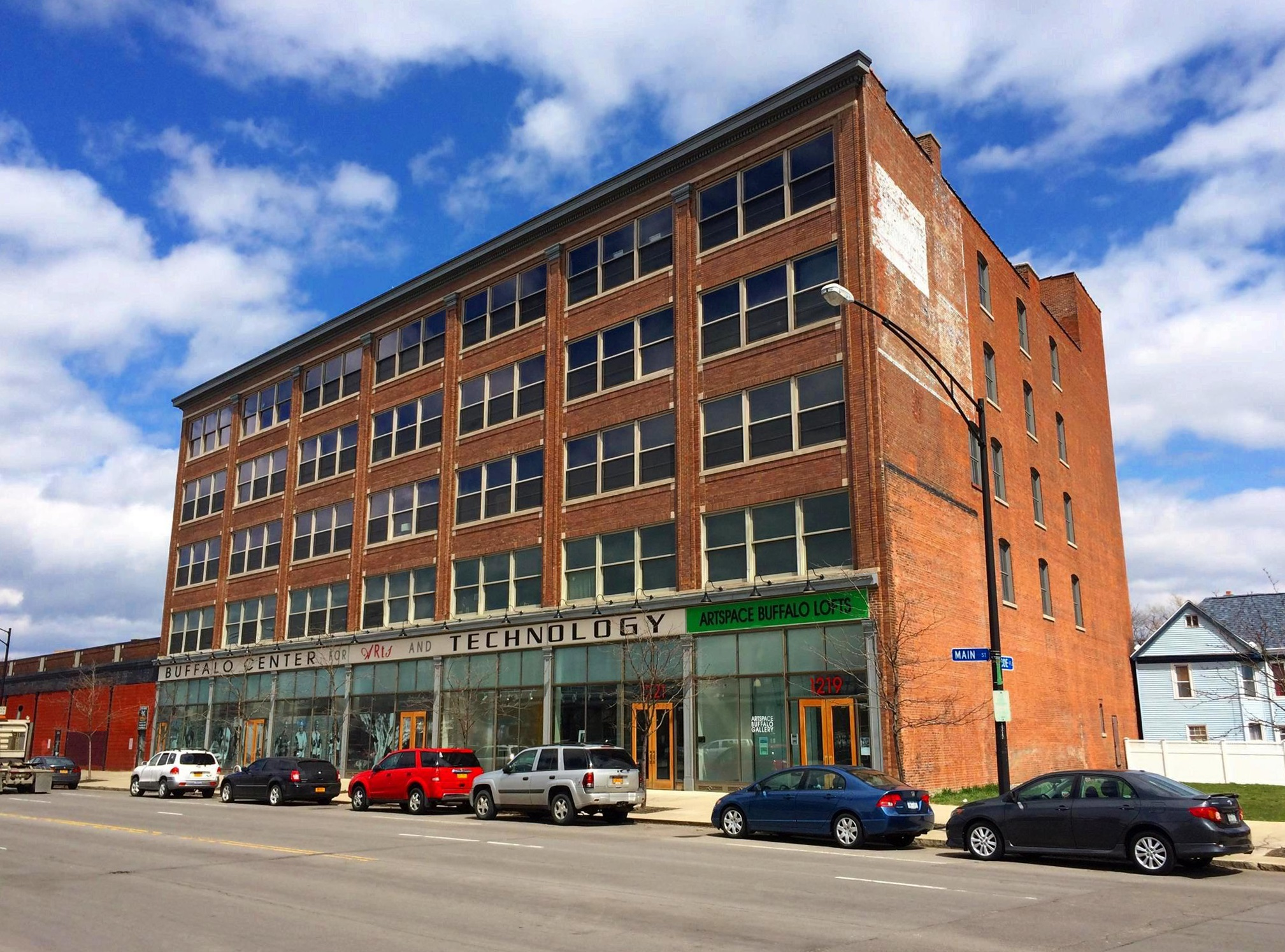
- Buffalo Electric Vehicle Company Building, April 2015

- Location within New York Location within the United States
- Location: 1219-1247 Main St., Buffalo, New York
- Coordinates: 42°54′24.9834″N 78°52′2.1786″W
- Area: 1.9 acres (0.77 ha)
- Built: 1910–1911; 115 years ago
- Architect: Wood and Bradney
- Architectural style: Late 19th And Early 20th Century American Movements, Daylight Factory
- NRHP reference No.: 05000571
- Added to NRHP: June 10, 2005

The Buffalo Electric Vehicle Company was an American electric car manufacturing company from 1912 until 1915 located at 1219-1247 Main Street in Buffalo, New York. The motorcars were marked under the Buffalo brand. The company was formed by a merger of several electrical vehicle and allied companies which included:

- Babcock Electric Carriage Company (whose founder Francis A. Babcock became Buffalo's president)
- Van Wagoner whose trucks were continued by the new company
- The Buffalo Automobile Station Company
- Buffalo Electric Carriage Company
- The Clark Motor Company

== History ==
The company's automobiles were commonly marketed to affluent women as an alternative to the dangerous manual crank starting that was required with a gasoline vehicle. The company went out of business in 1916.

The Buffalo Electric Vehicle Company Building is a historic automobile factory and showroom located at Buffalo in Erie County, New York. It was constructed in 1910–1911. The building has been redeveloped as home to "Artspace Buffalo."

The company's factory and showroom was listed on the National Register of Historic Places in 2005.
