= Buffalo Township, Cloud County, Kansas =

Buffalo Township
- Township
- Location in Cloud County
- Coordinates: 39°35′05″N 097°46′56″W
- Country: United States
- State: Kansas
- County: Cloud

Area
  - Total: 43.4 sq mi (112.5 km^{2})
  - Land: 43.24 sq mi (111.98 km^{2})
  - Water: 0.20 sq mi (0.52 km^{2}) 0.46%
- Elevation: 1,385 ft (422 m)

Population (2020)
  - Total: 93
  - Density: 2.2/sq mi (0.83/km^{2})
- GNIS feature ID: 0485434

Buffalo Township is a township in Cloud County, Kansas, United States. As of the 2020 census, its population was 93.

== History ==
Buffalo Township was organized in 1866.

== Geography ==
Buffalo Township covers an area of 43.43 square miles (112.5 km^{2}) and contains no incorporated settlements. According to the USGS, it contains two cemeteries: Fairview and West Branch.

The streams of West Branch Wolf Creek and Whites Creek run through this township.
